= List of River Monsters episodes =

River Monsters is a wildlife documentary television series produced by Icon Films of Bristol for Animal Planet and ITV, presented by biologist and extreme angler Jeremy Wade. In each episode, Wade investigates reports of attacks, disappearances and local legends attributed to freshwater (and, in later series, marine) creatures, attempting to identify and catch the animal responsible.

The series premiered on 5 April 2009 and concluded on 28 May 2017, running for nine series comprising 58 episodes, (Note: Episode count excludes specials and River Monsters: Unhooked rebroadcasts; see series overview.) in addition to a number of specials and companion broadcasts such as River Monsters: Unhooked. The ninth series, promoted as River Monsters: Mysteries of the Ocean, was announced as the programme's last in March 2017. River Monsters became one of the most-watched programmes in Animal Planet's history.

== Series overview ==
Season	Episodes	Originally released	
Season	Episodes	First released	Last released
1	7	5 April 2009	17 May 2009
2	7	28 March 2010 (Note: "Demon Fish" premiered on Discovery Channel on 28 March 2010 as a preview; the season's run on Animal Planet began on 25 April 2010.)	30 May 2010
3	7	10 April 2011	30 May 2011
4	7 (Note: The two-hour season finale "Lair of Giants" (28 May 2012) is counted here as a special.)	1 April 2012	20 May 2012
5	6	7 April 2013	27 May 2013
6	6	6 April 2014	26 May 2014
7	6	5 April 2015	17 May 2015
8	5	7 April 2016	26 May 2016
9	6	23 April 2017	28 May 2017

== Season 1 (2009) ==
No.	Title	Original release date	Unhooked air date
1	"Piranha"	5 April 2009	5 May 2010
Red-bellied piranha Jeremy Wade journeys to the heart of Brazil, following reports in which a bus crashed into the Amazon River and the passengers were eaten by a pack of red-bellied piranhas. He investigates this and other stories to determine if the piranha deserves its reputation and what exactly triggers a feeding frenzy. During his trip to remote regions of the Amazon River basin, he finds out that the bloodthirsty piranha is both predator and prey. Finally he hears a chilling story about a child fallen into the river and after a few seconds, only the skeleton was found. He finally uncovers that piranhas can be dangerous to humans, but usually in the dry season, when other food is scarce. Featured animals: Red-bellied piranha (Pygocentrus nattereri); Amazon river dolphin (Inia geoffrensis); Payara (Hydrolycus armatus); Ripsaw catfish (Oxydoras niger); Black piranha (Serrasalmus rhombeus)
2	"Killer Catfish"	12 April 2009	23 May 2010
Mugger crocodile Jeremy arrives at the Kali River in India, where a number of mysterious drownings have occurred. He investigates the possibilities of the culprit being whirlpools or crocodiles, but determines neither fit. Wade eventually discovers a little-known catfish species that can grow to human size or bigger, the goonch, also known as the giant devil catfish. He reasons that, since funeral pyres are done at the shore of the river, the fish feed off the burnt human remains. This would allow them to reach man-eating size, as well as giving them a taste for humans. Jeremy then hunts for a large goonch. Jeremy spends weeks trying to catch this elusive fish, and is eventually successful. This was the first ever episode of River Monsters to be made, but it only became a "Bonus episode" on the Region 1 DVDs and never released in the UK. This is likely because the idea of creating a series on monstrous fish came after shooting this episode (as explained in the 2014 special "Killer Mysteries"). Featured animals: Goonch catfish (Bagarius yarrelli); Indian narrow-headed softshell turtle (Chitra indica); Golden mahseer (Tor putitora); Mugger crocodile (Crocodylus palustris); Gharial (Gavialis gangeticus); South Asian river dolphin (Platanista gangetica); Indian flapshell turtle (Lissemys punctata)
3	"Alligator Gar"	19 April 2009	9 May 2010
Alligator gar Jeremy travels to the Trinity River in Texas, USA to discover the truth behind the alligator gar, a massive predator blamed for attacks on humans. Reports claim this fish is more dangerous than a man-eating shark. With huge jaws and two rows of needle-sharp teeth, the gar proves an elusive opponent. This fish has been frequently misunderstood throughout the years. Large populations were killed around the country, bringing this animal to near extinction. Bowfishermen also kill this fish with spears, but Jeremy wants to catch one gar alive and release it back safely. Finally hooking a large gar, Jeremy finds out once and for all if the alligator gar deserves its reputation as a river monster. Featured animals: Alligator gar (Atractosteus spatula); American alligator (Alligator mississippiensis); Smallmouth buffalo (Ictiobus bubalus); Spiny softshell turtle (Apalone spinifera)
4	"European Maneater"	26 April 2009	26 May 2010
Wels catfish The Wels catfish is one of the largest catfish in the world. Medieval reports claim it is an aggressive man eater that will swallow people whole, even small children were found in one's stomach according to a legend. After new reports surface of attacks in Berlin, Germany, Jeremy Wade dives deep into the mystery of these fish. He finds out that these giants attack when they are protecting their nests during the breeding season. His investigation later leads him to Spain, where a group of catfish were introduced into the warm watered Rio Ebro. Numerous factors led to these creatures taking over the ecosystem and possibly growing to man-eating size, for example because of the fishermen's 'catch and release' policy. There, Jeremy finds that these river monsters have no fear of man, and faces a potential maneater. Featured animals: Wels catfish (Silurus glanis); Zander (Sander lucioperca); Egyptian vulture (Neophron percnopterus); Griffon vulture (Gyps fulvus)
5	"Amazon Assassins"	3 May 2009	28 April 2010
Arapaima The Amazon has a huge amount of river monsters. Anacondas, caimans, piranhas and jaguars all call this place home. Years ago, Jeremy Wade travelled here looking for the arapaima, a 10-foot long fish that has been known to ram predators with the force of a car crash. The trip resulted in Jeremy feeling the full force of one of these blows as one arapaima's tail hit his chest. Now Jeremy has returned to Brazil to once again face off against this fish and determine if the arapaima deserves to be on the Amazon's already large list of monsters. Journeying to the few spots where fishing for these fish is allowed, he encounters an arapaima farm where the fish do something surprising. Jeremy then hears stories of the Amazon's other killers, the caiman. He searches for these, as well as a mysterious legend with its roots buried deep in folklore. Then, after finding the perfect spot, he finally comes face to face with the legendary giant, whose body could become a living missile. Featured animals: Arapaima (Arapaima gigas); Tiger sorubim (Pseudoplatystoma tigrinum); Black caiman (Melanosuchus niger); Tambaqui (Colossoma macropomum); Green anaconda (Eunectes murinus); Yellow-spotted river turtle (Podocnemis unifilis); Spectacled caiman (Caiman crocodilus); Additional creature: the cobra grande
6	"Amazon Flesh Eaters"	10 May 2009	2 May 2010
Redtail catfish Following a report of a fisherman swallowed whole, Jeremy travels to South America in search of the Amazon's largest catfish, the piraíba. Arriving there, Wade not only tries to catch this monster, but discovers that it belongs to a whole family of Amazonian killers. He catches as many catfish species as he can to prove that these whiskered predators really are the ultimate monsters of this place. His mission is to try and catch the three largest catfishes until he encounters with the smallest ones. He finds the candiru, a tiny blood-sucking catfish that has entered a man's body in the most horrifying of places, and the candiru-acú, a catfish that swarms around and drills holes in dead or dying animals, including humans, eating them from the inside out and leaving only the skin and bones. Discovering the horrifying deeds of these fish only pushes him even further, until he faces off with the giant head of the murderous catfish family, 'the mother of all catfishes', the piraíba. Featured animals: Piraíba (Brachyplatystoma filamentosum); Redtail catfish (Phractocephalus hemioliopterus); Jau catfish (Zungaro zungaro); Candirú (Vandellia cirrhosa); Candirú-Acú (Cetopsis candiru); payara (Hydrolycus armatus); Mexican burrowing caecilian (Dermophis mexicanus); Bloch's catfish (Pimelodus blochii)
7	"Freshwater Shark"	17 May 2009	12 May 2010
Bull shark Sharks are perhaps the most dangerous and feared of all fish, but these predators are confined to the oceans. Or maybe not... The bull shark, the most dangerous and aggressive shark, has been known to swim miles up rivers. Jeremy follows reports of attacks in rivers near the most populated shores of Australia to find out why and how far these fish swim upstream. He traces the trail of blood left by these monsters from bays and lagoons to rivers, until he finally zeros in on the lair of these sea monsters. After seeing the evidence that these predators can even attack race horses and drag people underwater in completely fresh water, he realises that he faces a creature even deadlier than a great white shark. While fishing for one, Jeremy finds something even more shocking and terrifying than a fully grown shark. Featured animals: Bull shark (Carcharhinus leucas); Saltwater crocodile (Crocodylus porosus); Giant grouper (Epinephelus lanceolatus); Freshwater crocodile (Crocodylus johnsoni); Short-finned eel (Anguilla australis)

== Season 2 (2010) ==
No.	Title	Original release date	Unhooked air date
8	"Demon Fish"	28 March 2010	16 August 2010
Goliath tigerfish Jeremy travels deep into the jungles of the Democratic Republic of the Congo in search of a little-known predator that may be the most terrifying monster of all: the fearsome Goliath tigerfish. This creature combines everything that made all previous river monsters deadly, and even more. Growing to 6 feet long with the jaws and teeth of a crocodile and an attitude of a shark, this beast is covered in armour plating and thick muscle. Basically a giant piranha, the tigerfish is believed to be responsible for gruesome deaths on humans, both in and out of water. The search for the elusive tigerfish pushes Jeremy to his mental limit as he uses everything he knows as a fisherman, as well as some luck from a witch doctor, to find this terrifying monster and uncover the truth behind a number of violent attacks. After several unsuccessful bites, he finally lands a true monster, but then he enters a dilemma to share this fish with the locals or let it swim away. Featured animals: Goliath tigerfish (Hydrocynus goliath); Lionhead cichlid (Steatocranus casuarius); African arowana (Heterotis niloticus); Smallmouth electric catfish (Malapterurus microstoma); West African bichir (Polypterus retropinnis)
9	"Death Ray"	25 April 2010	20 August 2010
Giant freshwater stingray Jeremy Wade ventures to the Mekong River in Thailand to find what may be the largest freshwater fish: the giant freshwater stingray. Armed with a 10-inch, venom-coated barb, this fish grows to 16 feet long and its venom has no known antidote. Unlike most South American freshwater stingrays (which usually don't get very big and deadly), this creature is a true monster. This behemoth can nearly glue itself to the bottom of the river, and once Jeremy hooks one, it may be his biggest challenge yet. In this adventure he also meets other giants of Southeast Asia: the gentle Mekong giant catfish, a close relative of the well-known iridescent shark. The giant barb he caught in this trip only appears on some photographs made during filming, but not in the actual episode or the extended cut. Featured animals: Giant freshwater stingray (Himantura polylepis); Mekong giant catfish (Pangasianodon gigas); Ocellate river stingray (Potamotrygon motoro); Giant barb (Catlocarpio siamensis)
10	"Killer Snakehead"	2 May 2010	9 August 2010
Northern snakehead Journeying to Florida in the US, Jeremy encounters the invasive bullseye snakehead, which were introduced to the state from Southeast Asia. With razor-sharp teeth and the abilities to breathe air and "walk" on land, these aggressive predators soon spawned numerous rumours of being man-eaters. Proving to be incredibly violent and vicious, Wade gets to the bottom of their monstrous rumours, only to be unconvinced of their lethality. That is, until he learns of another species, the giant snakehead, which is reported to be the largest and most dangerous of all the snakeheads. Meanwhile, he travels up to Illinois and gets a taste of how much of an impact an invasive species such as the silver carp can have on humans. Arriving at Khao Laem Dam along the River Kwai in Thailand, Wade uncovers stories of attacks, one being fatal. With no luck in reeling one specimen in with a line, he then dives deep into a murky river right in the middle of a school of young snakehead, hoping to find their murderous parents. Featured animals: Giant snakehead (Channa micropeltes); Silver carp (Hypophthalmichthys molitrix); Bullseye snakehead (Channa marulius); Butterfly peacock bass (Cichla ocellaris); Florida gar (Lepisosteus platyrhincus); Mozambique tilapia (Oreochromis mossambicus); Alligator gar (Atractosteus spatula); Bluegill (Lepomis macrochirus); Northern snakehead (Channa argus)
11	"Congo Killer"	9 May 2010	6 August 2010
Marbled lungfish Jeremy Wade travels to the Congo once again, the only river to ever defeat him. He had once travelled there, only to catch nothing. Now he's back, investigating reports of fishermen being dragged to their death by a malevolent river spirit. Wade suspects the vundu and the kamba catfish, which are known to grow to large sizes. But he begins to wonder if there are any monstrous sized fish out there in these waters. While staying with local villagers, he faces their superstitious beliefs because they blame his arrival for the disappearance of the chief's brother. Even mosquitoes are deadly here. In the past, Jeremy nearly lost his life to malaria. After using traditional Congolese fishing methods, hearing of how one fisherman died, and finally facing a catfish, Jeremy begins to wonder if the real danger isn't the fish itself. Featured animals: Kamba catfish (Chrysichthys cranchii); Giraffe catfish (Auchenoglanis occidentalis); Vundu (Heterobranchus longifilis); Obscure snakehead (Parachanna obscura); Marbled lungfish (Protopterus aethiopicus); Gambian malaria mosquito (Anopheles gambiae)
12	"Alaskan Horror"	16 May 2010	19 August 2010
White sturgeon Deep in the Alaskan wilderness, Lake Iliamna is supposedly the home of a monster. Reports claim it grows 20 feet long and is responsible for the disappearance of many fishermen. Investigating the identity of this creature, Jeremy faces cold-water fishing for the first time during the series. He investigates the possibility of the monster being a pike or a beluga whale, but none would match the description. Wade then tries to find out a possible food source: salmon. This results in the first salmon he has on the end of his line, only to have it stolen by a bear. After hearing an eyewitness' encounter, Jeremy is able to determine the identity of the culprit: a white sturgeon. These fish grow to 20 feet long and are known to leap out of the water, which could result in people going missing. Fishing for sturgeon, Wade soon faces what may be the biggest fish he's ever caught (although this episode was shot before "Death Ray", which features his biggest catch in this season). Featured animals: White sturgeon (Acipenser transmontanus); Grizzly bear (Ursus arctos horribilis); Beluga whale (Delphinapterus leucas); Northern pike (Esox lucius); Sockeye salmon (Oncorhynchus nerka); Harbor seal (Phoca vitulina); Salmon shark (Lamna ditropis)
13	"Rift Valley Killers"	23 May 2010	19 August 2010
Nile crocodile and Nile tilapia In the heart of Africa's Rift Valley, lives the Nile perch, Africa's largest freshwater bony fish. Growing to more than 6 feet long (according to some fishermen's photographs), this fish is considered a prize and is what many people brave countless perils to catch. Jeremy travels to the birthplace of humanity and the oldest and most dangerous fishing spot he ever visited to find this legendary creature. He faces off against deadly crocodiles, even deadlier hippos, and killer gangs to find the perch, and is amazed at the daily dangers people face every day to catch this fish. He then takes on these perils, even risks his life to land a monster perch. Featured animals: Nile perch (Lates niloticus); Semutundu catfish (Bagrus docmak); Nile tilapia (Oreochromis niloticus); African rock python (Python sebae); Hippopotamus (Hippopotamus amphibius); Nile crocodile (Crocodylus niloticus)
14	"Hidden Predator"	30 May 2010	12 August 2010
Bull shark One year ago, Jeremy Wade was investigating the bull shark in Australia and caught a small pup, proving that the sharks were breeding in the local rivers. Around the same time, a group of scientists in South Africa made a shocking discovery: the largest bull shark ever caught, and it was found in a river. Now the team is back on business, and they've brought Jeremy with them in hopes of finding out if this was a horrifying fluke, or if the sharks have made the river their homes. Jeremy discovers that the largely populated river is full of sharks, yet nobody has ever been attacked. Wade realises the reason why these fish are in this river as well as why there have been no attacks, and lands two of his biggest catches yet. Featured animals: Bull shark (Carcharhinus leucas); Backwater butterfly ray (Gymnura natalensis); Dusky kob (Argyrosomus japonicus); Smallspotted grunter (Pomadasys commersonnii); Bluespotted stingray (Dasyatis kuhlii); White sea catfish (Galeichthys feliceps); Grass carp (Ctenopharyngodon idella)
Special	"Killer Catfish (Extended Cut)"	31 May 2010	TBA
Indian narrow-headed softshell turtle Jeremy arrives at the Kali River in India, where a number of mysterious drownings have occurred. He investigates the possibilities of the culprit being whirlpools or crocodiles, but determines neither fit. Wade eventually finds out of a little-known catfish species that can grow to human size or bigger, the goonch, also known as the giant devil catfish. He reasons that, since funeral pyres are done at the shore of the river, the fish feed off the burnt human remains. This would allow them to reach man-eating size, as well as giving them a taste of people. First he must enter goonch territory, when he faces smaller individuals in a national park and film them underwater with a professional assistant. After catching smaller ones, Jeremy then must face off against a large goonch which may prove there are monster goonch ready to eat people. Believing to have proven his point, he prepares to leave. Casting his line one last time, Jeremy hooks an even bigger monster and has a brief encounter with what may just be the Kali killer. This version of the episode was never released in home media. Not featured animals in the original episode: golden mahseer, Indian narrow-headed softshell turtle, gharial, South Asian river dolphin, Indian flapshell turtle. Featured animals: Goonch catfish (Bagarius yarrelli); Indian narrow-headed softshell turtle (Chitra indica); Golden mahseer (Tor putitora); Mugger crocodile (Crocodylus palustris); Gharial (Gavialis gangeticus); South Asian river dolphin (Platanista gangetica); Indian flapshell turtle (Lissemys punctata)

== Season 3 (2011) ==
No.	Title	Original release date	Unhooked air date
Special	"The Giants"	6 March 2011	TBA
Biologist and extreme fisherman Jeremy Wade offers a retrospective of his harrowing attempts to reel in some of the largest freshwater fish in the world, including a man-eating catfish and a massive stingray in Thailand.
Special	"The Deadliest"	3 April 2011	TBA
Giant grouper Jeremy Wade tells of the most dangerous of all the river monsters he's ever faced from the previous seasons. He relives the most gruesome, terrifying and shocking encounters with these creatures. Episodes featured: "Piranha" – Jeremy tosses a dead duck in the water and witnesses the ferocity of the flesh-eating piranha. The fish only left the skin, the bones and some feathers. Jeremy must face the truth of what might have happened to a child who fell into the water not so long ago.; "Freshwater Shark" – Jeremy hooks into a gigantic marine fish in freshwater: a Giant grouper. Jeremy then proves that sharks aren't just sea monsters and he even catches a small bull shark. This is the first ever proof that shark aren't just swimming around in the Australian rivers, they even breed in them.; "Killer Snakehead" – Jeremy dives into a school of snakehead young to find their murderous parents. Using a traditional technique of fishing with an arrow, he can take his hands on a huge female giant snakehead and he can even release it without permanent injuries.; "Demon Fish" – Jeremy faces his ultimate river monster: the Goliath tigerfish. After losing some tigerfish he hooked, he finally catches a real river monster, only to realise that it's too weak to be released. The fish soon dies and Jeremy gives its body to a close-by village to feed the people.; Featured animals: Red-bellied Piranha (Pygocentrus nattereri); Giant grouper (Epinephelus lanceolatus); Bull shark (Carcharhinus leucas); Giant snakehead (Channa micropeltes); Goliath tigerfish (Hydrocynus goliath)
15	"The Mutilator"	10 April 2011	29 May 2011
Red-bellied pacu Deep in the jungles of Papua New Guinea, two separate deaths have attracted the media: two men were found to have bled to death in the Sepik river as a result of a "ball cutter" attacking villagers. Jeremy Wade travels to this unexplored river to uncover the creature responsible for the savage attacks. While fishing for a possible food source, Wade makes an unusual discovery. A pacu from the Amazon River. These fish are related to the piranha and are from South America, where they use their strange, almost human-like teeth to actually crack hard-shelled nuts and fruits and eat them. Jeremy makes a terrible discovery about the seemingly-placid red-bellied pacu living in the Sepik. These animals here can actually have a taste for human flesh. Featured animals: Red-bellied pacu (Piaractus brachypomus); Saltwater crocodile (Crocodylus porosus); Triangular-shield catfish (Neoarius leptaspis); Nile tilapia (Oreochromis niloticus)
16	"Flesh Ripper"	17 April 2011	24 May 2011
Featured animals: New Zealand longfin eel New Zealand longfin eel After reading reports of flesh-eating eels in New Zealand, Jeremy Wade journeys to a land which he always thought a safe place to swim. Captain James Cook's memoirs and Māori folklore's tell of man-eating snake-like creatures. He treks into the Waitomo Caves and Lake Manapouri and discovers just how savage and dangerous these "devourers of men" can be. Armed with razor-sharp teeth which prevent escape, these eels spin and tear off bits of flesh like a crocodile. Although he already knows they have the ability to cause serious harm, Wade still must determine if they have the attitude to attack a human to find out if they deserve their reputation. The only way to do this is to put himself on the menu.
17	"Silent Assassin"	24 April 2011	26 May 2011
Featured animals: short-tailed river stingray, red-bellied piranha, tiger sorubim, pati, golden dorado Argentina's Parana River, home to the short-tail river stingray In Argentina's part of the Paraná River, a young girl was killed by a river stingray. Venturing to a country he's never been to before, to face a fish he's never heard of before, Jeremy travels to this river to find the killer: the shorttail river stingray, which grows to 6 feet across. Unlike Thailand's giant freshwater stingray, this fish isn't long or wide. Instead it is thick and heavy, with a short, clublike tail with which it delivers its venomous sting. After hearing many more reports of attacks, Jeremy becomes determined to face this beast, which can glue itself to the river bottom like a suction cup. Its strength is then proven as Wade hooks into this tank-like fish in what is his longest battle to date.: Note: Wade's battle with the shortail river stingray was his longest until the filming of Season 9, where it took him around six hours to bring in a yellowfin tuna
18	"Chainsaw Predator"	1 May 2011	28 May 2011
Featured animals: Largetooth sawfish, bull shark, barramundi, saltwater crocodile, mangrove crab Largetooth sawfish 25 years ago, Jeremy Wade was in a hardware store in the Amazon when he came across a weapon more sinister than any he had seen before. It was a yard long and studded on each side with 2-inch long teeth. This strange weapon was the snout of a sawfish: a 20-foot relative of the rays which has been known to swim hundreds of miles upriver. Reports claim this shark-like fish hacks boats apart and saws people in half, feasting on their flesh. Wade travels to the Fitzroy River in Western Australia to find out if this critically endangered creature deserves its reputation as a river monster and why it swims so far up rivers. After being plagued by crocodiles and sharks, (which, ironically, he had previously travelled to Australia to find, yet didn't catch one for weeks) Wade hooks into this bladed beast and reels in a 7-foot monster. The episode is dedicated in memory of wildlife expert Malcolm Douglas, who died in a car accident shortly after filming.
Special	"The Most Bizarre"	8 May 2011	TBA
Amazon river dolphin Recalling an encounter with a mysterious animal he sighted on the Amazon River, Jeremy Wade relives his encounters with the world's most bizarre freshwater fish, and reveals the identity of his mystery creature. Episodes featured: "Amazon Flesh Eaters" – Jeremy Wade comes face to face with a family of fishes that include some real monsters: the family of catfishes. One of them is even capable of swallowing a man whole, says reports. Jeremy finds a gruesome scene of how aggressive Amazon fish can be. He meets the fish that devours you from the inside-out. Jeremy then uncovers a shocking tale of a fish entering the body of a man in the most horrifying of places. Finally he meets a very unusual catfish and catches the 'mother of all catfishes'.; "Alligator Gar" – Jeremy encounters a monster fish with a deadly set of teeth in the Deep South. One of these giants even draw blood on his hand. But he soon realises that these animals need our protection now more than ever to prevent their extinction.; "Killer Snakehead" – When Jeremy travelled to North America in search of the highly invasive bullseye snakehead, he also discovered a strange behaviour of introduced species. Silver carps jump out of the water in huge numbers when threatened by motor boats and they can sometimes easily knock out people too, only to be dragged underwater by the hooks tangled to their arms.; "Congo Killers" – Jeremy meets some villagers with a very bizarre fish that can breathe air and can grasp into dry land. In one of his most dangerous expedition in his life, he finds out that not the fish, but the interplay of the weather and the unusual fishing technique the locals use are the culprits of some strange disappearances.; Featured animals: Piraíba (Brachyplatystoma filamentosum); Redtail catfish (Phractocephalus hemioliopterus); Candirú-Acú (Cetopsis candiru); Payara (Hydrolycus armatus); Candirú (Vandellia cirrhosa); Alligator gar (Atractosteus spatula); Silver carp (Hypophthalmichthys molitrix); Marbled lungfish (Protopterus aethiopicus); Amazon river dolphin (Inia geoffrensis)
19	"Electric Executioner"	15 May 2011	23 May 2011
Featured animals: electric eel, Black piranha, Bigtooth river stingray, redtail catfish, marbled swamp eel, wolf fish, fidalgo. Electric eel Jeremy Wade returns to the Amazon to search for a mysterious and deadly killer with a reputation to match its awesome ability. Hearing the stories of three cowboys in Pará dying at the same time without any bite marks or stab wounds on them, he rules out piranhas and stingrays. After hearing a witness' claim, he concludes that the killer was an electric eel: an 8-foot, snake-like fish that possesses the bizarre ability to produce up to 600 volts of electricity. Following stories of "invisible powers", he journeys all over Brazil, searching for the elusive fish. Jeremy then comes across a story that confirms the eel's ability to kill a man, but he still tries to find out if it can kill three as the story claims. After searching through the smallest of ponds he can find in the dry season, he finally finds a large eel in little more than a mud-puddle. After fishing it out, Wade makes a startling discovery that could possibly explain why three people died simultaneously.
20	"Cold Blooded Horror"	22 May 2011	25 May 2011
Featured animals: Japanese giant salamander, Chinese giant salamander, Chinese/Japanese hybrid salamander, giant Lake Biwa catfish, Amur catfish, tiger puffer, turtle Japanese giant salamander For the first time in his life, Jeremy Wade travels to Japan to learn more about its legendary river monsters. In a Tokyo fish market, he interviews many fisherman and uncovers two seemingly unbelievable stories: the Namazu, an enormous catfish that supposedly causes the numerous earthquakes in Japan whenever it wriggles its huge body; and the Kappa, a gremlin-like beast that drags children underwater and devours their souls. On Lake Biwa, Wade investigates the origin of the namazu legend as well as searches for a connection between catfish and earthquakes. After finding a reasonable explanation, he turns his attention to the Kappa. After visiting a shrine to the creature, he finds an alleged mummified kappa and starts wondering if the kappa isn't a fish, but something else entirely. Wade speaks with a scientist about what other creatures live in Japanese rivers, and he learns of a creature known as the Hanzaki, which can grow to 6 feet. Diving into a swift-moving stream, Jeremy comes face-to-face with the strangest and most unexpected river monster he's ever met.
Special	"River Monsters Goes Tribal"	29 May 2011	TBA
Gray reef shark Featured animals: fringelip mullet, grey reef shark, Houndfish Jeremy Wade travels to the Solomon Islands in the South Pacific to put his fishing skills to the test. Living with an island tribe with ancient customs, he learns of their traditional and even unusual fishing methods using bows, vines, and spiderwebs. Inspired by Ernest Hemingway's novel, The Old Man and the Sea, read nearly four decades earlier, Jeremy finally achieves his lifelong dream of landing a shark simply with a baited handline...and in a dugout canoe, no less!
21	"Jungle Killer"	30 May 2011	1 June 2011
Featured animals: Anjumara, redtail catfish, wolf fish, Black piranha, spectacled caiman Wolf fish Everyone knows the piranha is the deadliest fish in South America, but is there a little-known fish that is even more vicious and aggressive than the supposed "flesh-eating piranha"? After receiving a report of a diver being brutally attacked, Jeremy Wade travels to Brokopondo Reservoir in the remote jungles of Suriname, where he interviews the victim and hears his idea of the culprit. The man claims the fish was the much-feared "Anjumara",: a large, aggressive predator with razor-sharp teeth. Wade travels deep into the jungle in search of a monster fish and uncovers more reports of their savagery, attacking people and animals on both land and sea. After a "shocking" event and a plague of piranha and caiman, Jeremy comes face-to-face with what is perhaps South America's most vicious fish.

== Season 4 (2012) ==
No.	Title	Original release date	Unhooked air date
22	"American Killers"	1 April 2012	21 May 2012
Featured animals: bull shark, Atlantic tarpon, Atlantic Goliath grouper, alligator gar, longnose gar, American paddlefish, blue catfish, flathead catfish, channel catfish Bull shark Jeremy Wade has travelled all over the world looking for killer freshwater fish. He has been down the Amazon, deep in the heart of Africa, in the murkiest swamps, in the Alaskan subarctic, and everywhere in between. But are there dangerous killers lurking in the lakes and rivers of the United States? Travelling to Florida, Jeremy once again encounters the bull shark, a species known to swim in freshwater, which he has faced before in Australia and South Africa. Bull sharks are believed to have been responsible for the Jersey Shore shark attacks of 1916, which inspired the 1974 novel Jaws. Three of the five attacks that occurred took place in a freshwater river. Following reports of sharks prowling the freshwater canals of Florida, Jeremy once again reels in a monster shark, as well as a little extra. Alligator gar Next, Wade returns to Texas' Trinity River, for a rematch with the alligator gar. In season 1, he had caught a 7-foot female gar and concluded that the fish had no interest in attacking people. Now, reports have surfaced that gar in Texas are once again reaching lengths of up to 14 feet, the perfect size for a potential killer. Having already experienced their impenetrable armour and razor sharp teeth, Jeremy follows reports of giant gar all over the Trinity, only to find possible evidence of giant gar in a very unexpected place. Then, Jeremy turns his attention to the Lake of the Ozarks, America's 3rd most dangerous lake, to investigate stories of catfish growing to man-eating proportions. Local divers have allegedly witnessed giant catfish and been too scared to dive in the lake again. Jeremy uncovers unbelievable stories of catfish eating already deceased humans, but he wonders if a catfish could ever be big enough or strong enough to kill a person. He finds his answer in Oklahoma, where people catch catfish in a very unusual and dangerous method.
23	"Pack of Teeth"	8 April 2012	21 May 2012
Featured animals: African tigerfish, redbreast tilapia, African sharptooth catfish, African pike, great egret, Nile crocodile African tigerfish In the Okavango River delta in Botswana, a ferry tips over. All the passengers die, and their bodies are retrieved stripped of flesh. Authorities write it off as crocodiles, but Jeremy Wade isn't so sure. The corpse resemble those devoured by piranha and raises the question of whether this was another case of an introduced species running amok. Travelling to the murky swamps of the delta, he is informed of a fish known locally as the ndweshi, which swarms in packs and is greatly feared. Described as long and muscular, with large teeth and horizontal black stripes, Jeremy goes hunting for a fish to match the description. Following a flock of birds, he finds a group of large predatory fish causing a commotion in the water. Casting out, he lands an African tigerfish, a smaller cousin of the Goliath tigerfish he caught in season 2. Believing to have found the ndweshi, he tries to discover if they really are pack-hunting killers. Hearing of a rare event believed to attract large numbers of tigerfish, Wade sets out only to find himself in the middle of a feeding frenzy.
24	"Invisible Executioner"	15 April 2012	22 May 2012
Featured animals: vundu, brown squeaker, African tigerfish, African sharptooth catfish, hippopotamus Vundu After hearing reports of fishermen disappearing in the Zambezi River in Zambia, Jeremy Wade journeys there to uncover the truth behind their deaths. He hears tales of a man getting pulled in and drowning in the rapids after hooking into a monster fish. The natives believe it to be the work of a large, serpentine fish the size of a man. They also tell Wade of a snakelike river spirit called Nyaminyami, who is angry at the Kariba Dam for blocking its river. Believing Nyaminyami to be inspired from the killer fish, he travels to Lake Kariba to find the beast. After nearly being capsized in a storm, Jeremy hears reports of small toddlers and children being eaten by the fish, known locally as "Mazunda," as well as a fisherman being dragged to the depths beneath the dam. Interviewing a witness of the "Mazunda," Wade learns of the vundu, southern Africa's largest fish. Travelling all over the Zambezi, Jeremy gains access to the prohibited waters directly beneath the dam, where he finally hooks into a monster. Note* The vundu was also featured in the Season 2 episode "Congo Killers"; no mention was made in this episode of ever having caught it before.
25	"Asian Slayer"	22 April 2012	TBA
Featured animals: sareng catfish, golden mahseer, Asian redtail catfish, Redtail catfish, Chinese seerfish, firewood catfish, arapaima, Mekong giant catfish, Asian elephant, Bengal tiger Mekong giant catfish Jeremy Wade's journey into extreme fishing started in India, where he caught large mahseer, and where he later caught a massive goonch that had been killing bathers. Now, he returns following reports of a new predator, capable of taking pets and small children. Looking around, he uncovers its identity: the sareng catfish, a streamlined predator with long jaws and sharp teeth. He also finds a problem: the sareng is sacred in India's Hindu religion and harming it is believed to curse you with bad luck. Almost immediately he encounters problems when the lake where he is fishing is closed and tries his luck in the wilderness of Corbett National Park, sharing the territory with man-eating tigers and wild elephants. The monsoon comes early and the fish are not biting, forcing him to leave the river. To escape what appears to be the wrath of the gods, he travels to Thailand to a lake inhabited by sareng, as well as countless other introduced river monsters. Despite not being a Hindu country, Thailand offers no protection from the gods as Jeremy seemingly catches every fish, especially red-tailed catfish, in the lake but the sareng. Deciding to face his demons instead of running from them, he returns to India to take part in a Hindu blessing, to appease the gods and convince them he means the fish no harm. Returning to the river, Jeremy finds he might have finally met his match. Notes: The sareng was caught in the Lost Reels episode "Himalayan Giants", but was not mentioned here.; The sareng was also caught in the series finale, "Malaysian Lake Monster"; The sareng was briefly seen in the episode "Mekong Mutilator" with several specimens on a rack in the fish market. Jeremy does not mention it by name, he just takes of look at the fish and then says to the camera that when he asked about the name of the fish the woman selling it just told him the price.
Special	"Killer Sharks and Rays"	29 April 2012	TBA
Featured animals: Bigtooth river stingray, short-tailed river stingray, grey reef shark, bull shark, Largetooth sawfish Jeremy Wade relives his most memorable encounters with deadly sharks and rays. Episode featured "Electric Executioner"- Jeremy reels in an unusual-looking stingray. "Silent Assassin"- Jeremy hooks into a massive river stingray in the longest battle on the show to date. "River Monsters Goes Tribal"- After gaining the tribe's trust, Jeremy lives his dream of reeling in a full-grown shark, with his bare hands. "Freshwater Shark"- Jeremy discovers that bull sharks not only live in rivers, but breed in them. "Hidden Predator"- Jeremy lands an enormous bull shark, in a heavily populated river. "Chainsaw Predator"- Jeremy finds an elusive species of ray that swims up rivers, and wields the most terrifying weapon of all time.
26	"Russian Killer"	6 May 2012	24 May 2012
Featured animals: kaluga, chum salmon, Amur catfish, Soldatov's catfish, Japanese sturgeon, bearded seal Kaluga Chasing reports of three fishermen disappearing without a trace, Jeremy Wade ventures to the far east of Russia to investigate the Amur River. There, he interviews some of the locals. When asked if there are any big fish in the water, the locals are strangely quiet. Believing that they are keeping some sort of secret, he talks to a local biologist, who tells him of an encounter with the kaluga: a predatory freshwater sturgeon species known to grow up to 18 feet long. The kaluga is the world's second largest freshwater fish. Armed with an enormous mouth, this fish could easily drag people in the water when hooked. But before he can try and catch one, he's told that fishing for kaluga is strictly outlawed. After the fall of the Soviet Union, a sudden surge of fishing nearly wiped them out, as they produce delicious caviar. Despite the fact that Russian authorities regularly patrol the river in speedboats to pursue those illegally hunting the elusive surviving sturgeons, people keep poaching them and telling no one, explaining the locals' secretive behaviour regarding big fish. Journeying with a team of biologists who can legally catch the fish for research, Jeremy sets out to catch what may be the last of these monstrous fish. Although Jeremy is unable to find an adult Kaluga, just before the trip ends he catches a very young juvenile, the best hope for the species' survival.
27	"Mongolian Mauler"	13 May 2012	25 May 2012
Featured animals: taimen, Siberian dace, Sharp-snouted lenok, Arctic grayling, Halys viper Taimen Jeremy Wade had wanted to catch large fish since he was a child. One fish that interested him was the taimen: the world's largest species of trout and a very popular game fish with tourists. Due to heavy fishing for these trophies, their numbers have greatly declined. When new reports surface of violent attacks on people, Jeremy seizes the opportunity to reel in one of the last giant taimen and travels to the wild frontiers of northern Mongolia, the taimen's last stronghold. Upon his arrival he immediately runs into a big problem: Mongolians are not keen fishers and believe that killing fish brings ill fortune. Trekking deep into the wilderness to the Delger-Moron River, he braves venomous vipers, violent gangs of gold prospectors and dangerous rapids. The legendary taimen proves elusive and his Mongolian guide brings in a shaman in hopes of appeasing the river spirit.
28	"Phantom Assassin"	20 May 2012	23 May 2012
Featured animals: northern river shark, bull shark, barramundi, Largetooth sawfish, freshwater whipray, winghead shark, king threadfin, saltwater crocodile, mangrove crab Northern river shark Most people think sharks and rays are purely sea creatures, but Jeremy Wade knows different. He's caught large freshwater stingrays in Argentina and Thailand, and a sawfish that could live in freshwater in Australia. He has also caught bull sharks in South Africa, Australia and Florida. Bull sharks are salt water fish that have an unusual ability to tolerate freshwater, but are there other sharks with this same ability? In 2002, scientists discovered a new genus of rare sharks known as Glyphis sharks which not only tolerate freshwater, but are purely freshwater fish. When a report of an unidentified attack on a person in Australia's Fitzroy River emerges, Jeremy Wade journeys down under, wondering if the attacker was a northern river shark, a species of Glyphis shark, and be one of the few people to catch one. Ruling out crocodiles and bull sharks, Jeremy determines that the little-known shark just might be the culprit. Joining a group of scientists, he sets out to a very dangerous body of water, only to make a discovery that could reveal the truth behind the attack. Then, battling both the odds and the tides, Jeremy hooks into a mysterious predator and becomes the first man to film it alive.
Special	"Killer Weapons"	22 May 2012	TBA
Featured animals: Largetooth sawfish, red-bellied pacu, electric eel, New Zealand longfin eel, bull shark, candiru, short-tailed river stingray Episode featured "Chainsaw Predator" – Jeremy goes through and gets a dangerous sawfish. "Electric Executioner" – Jeremy finds the ultimate eel. "Flesh Ripper" – Jeremy fishes an eel in New Zealand. "Hidden Predator" – Wade finds a camouflaged shark in Australia. "Amazon Flesh Eaters" – Jeremy goes to the Amazon River and catches the candiru.
Special	"Lethal Legends"	23 May 2012	TBA
Featured animals: Japanese giant salamander, white sturgeon, sareng catfish, taimen, New Zealand longfin eel, vundu Episode featured "Cold Blooded Horror" – Jeremy caught a Japanese giant salamander by hand. "Alaskan Horror" – Jeremy caught a white sturgeon "Asian Slayer" – Jeremy encounters problems when he tries to fish for the sareng catfish, a fish sacred in Hindu religion. "Mongolian Mauler" – Catching taimen in Mongolia is considered bad luck so Jeremy visited a shaman to appease the spirit of the river. His offering paid off and he managed to catch a taimen. "Flesh Ripper" – Jeremy caught a New Zealand longfin eel using a technique he learned from a local fisherman. "Invisible Executioner" – Jeremy investigated the legend of Nyaminyami, a snakelike river spirit. He hooked a vundu after he was given permission to fish in a restricted area, located directly beneath a dam.
Special	"Deadliest Encounters"	24 May 2012	TBA
Featured animals: Anjumara, arapaima, flathead catfish, giant snakehead, grey reef shark, Nile tilapia, sockeye salmon Jeremy recounted some of his closest call with forces beyond his control that nearly turned danger into disaster. Episodes featured "Jungle Killer" – Jeremy and his crew were struck by lightning while fishing for Anjumara in Suriname, Brazil. "Amazon Assassins" – Having once been injured by arapaima, Jeremy tried to overcome his fear for the fish by helping some arapaima fisherman at a fish farm. Out in the wild, Jeremy managed to catch a giant 150 lb arapaima. "American Killers"- Jeremey tried hand-catching for flathead catfish in Oklahoma. "Killer Snakehead" – Jeremy travels to Thailand and hunts for giant snakehead in a murky river with his guide using a rusty hand-made spear gun. "River Monsters Goes Tribal" – Jeremy dives into a reef full of sharks without getting bitten. "Rift Valley Killers" – Jeremy encounters crocodile and hippopotamus while helping the local fisherman tend their fishing nets for Nile tilapia. "Alaskan Horror" – Jeremy travels to Alaska to fish for sockeye salmon. The first salmon he caught was stolen by a grizzly bear cub.
Special	"Untold Stories"	25 May 2012	TBA
Jeremy Wade is renowned for tracking down freshwater beasts, yet it's the untold stories of what happened along the way that are often the best. In this special 'Behind-the-Scenes' edition, Wade reveals how reeling in the big fish is often the easy part.
Special	"Deadliest Catfish"	27 May 2012	TBA
Featured animals: goonch catfish, piraiba, blue catfish, flathead catfish, wels catfish, vundu, sareng catfish, candiru, candiru acu, Jeremy remembers some of his encounters with the catfish family over the years. Episodes featured "European Maneater" – Jeremy investigates the wels catfish where medieval accounts reported an aggressive maneater that swallow man whole. "Amazon Flesheaters" – Jeremy catches the redtail catfish. He also find the candiru which has entered a man's body through his urethra. Finally, he investigates the candiru-acù, a small catfish that dills holes in dead or dying animals before eating them from the inside. "American Killers" – Jeremy catches the blue catfish and channel catfish at the Lake of the Ozarks. "Amazon Flesheaters" – Jeremy catches the Amazon's largest catfish, an 80 lb (36 kg) piraiba. "Asian Slayer" – Jeremy investigates the sareng catfish in India. "Killer Catfish" – Jeremy attempts to catch a goonch catfish which has reportedly grown to man-eating size.
Special	"Lair of Giants"	28 May 2012	28 May 2012
Featured animals: laulao catfish, Barbado catfish, payara, redtail catfish, red bellied piranha, jau catfish, Tambaqui, Anjumara, arapaima, black caiman, green anaconda, Goliath tarantula Black caiman The season four finale episode is a two-hour look into one of the most challenging expeditions of Jeremy Wade's life. He'll travel to the isolated and untouched jungles of Guyana, South America, where early explorers wrote about a river system filled with mysterious giants. Armed with only old journals and his rod, Wade embarks on an epic journey where he'll tackle the Essequibo – South America's third largest and largely unconquered river. He immerses himself in the culture of the Mucushi and must earn the trust of these native people to gather their knowledge and hear their stories. Once again he'll set out to separate fact from fiction. His last and greatest catch turns out to be a species of arapaima new to science.

== Season 5 (2013) ==
No.	Title	Original release date	Unhooked air date
29	"Face Ripper"	7 April 2013	20 May 2013
'Featured animals': black piranha, largespot river stingray, flatwhisker catfish, red bellied piranha, payara, speckled peacock bass, arapaima, piraiba, black caiman Black piranha When a story surfaces of a man in Bolivia who had his face ripped off by something in the water, Jeremy Wade ventures deep into the South American jungle to find out what kind of horrible monster could be capable of this. Casting his line out, he catches nothing but piranha, but his previous experiments in Season 1 proved that piranha won't attack unless under special circumstances, so he immediately dismisses them as the culprit. But then, an interview with the doctor who performed the post-mortem on the victim reveals piranhas as the culprits. Intrigued by this change in behaviour, Jeremy assumes it must be some new species. Travelling to a flooded forest, he is once again surprised to find black piranha, which are usually solitary hunters, engaging in very aggressive pack behaviour. Jeremy assumes these newly aggressive black piranha must be the culprit, until an interview with a witness reveals that it was red bellied piranhas that ate the man's face. As this goes against his previous findings on piranha behaviour, Jeremy suspects that there must be some introduced predator in the river system that is making the piranha turn to man-eating tendencies. Investigating, Jeremy finds himself once again going face to face with what is perhaps his greatest adversary.
30	"Atomic Assassin"	14 April 2013	17 May 2013
Featured animals: wels catfish, northern pike, European perch, Volga zander, European chub, marsh tit Wels catfish Following tales of a massive fish in Ukraine said to have tried to drag a man to his death, Jeremy Wade heads to the rural lakes of the former Soviet Union chasing the culprit. Asking around, he learns that there is indeed a large fish in the lake, but the local name is not familiar to him. Interviewing more locals, Jeremy learns of another attack, in which a repairman was diving in a cooling pool at a nuclear power plant when his arm was ripped off by a massive fish. When he asks for the name of the power plant, Jeremy's fears are realised: Chernobyl, home of the worst nuclear accident in history. Believing the contaminated waters to be the home to some kind of mutant monster, Jeremy travels to the abandoned and radioactive city of Pripyat to hunt down the beast. There, he finds a picture of the beast, and discovers it to be the massive wels catfish, a monster Jeremy has battled before. Putting himself in danger of radiation exposure, Jeremy fishes right in the shadow of the nuclear reactor and he comes face to face with a mutant river monster.
31	"Killer Torpedo"	21 April 2013	23 May 2013
Featured animals: Atlantic tarpon, horse eye jack, Serra Spanish mackerel, black vulture, crab, shrimp, mullet, bull shark Tarpon Jeremy searches for a large fish that supposedly jumps out of the water and knocks fishermen out of their boats. He is confronted with one on the first day of fishing, but has no idea what it is. He soon finds these fish to be Atlantic tarpon living in the brackish waters of Nicaragua. He then has one of his longest battles yet in a foot powered raft using a fly rod in a remote river with a 130 pound tarpon.
32	"Colombian Slasher"	5 May 2013	24 May 2013
Featured animals: discus ray, red bellied piranha, ocellated river stingray, Potamotrygon magdalenae,Short-tailed river stingray, Ripsaw catfish, Ageneiosus inermis, arapaima, Tambaqui,Hydrolycus armatus Discus ray Jeremy arrives in Colombia's area of the Amazon, hearing the story of a bride that was attacked by an unidentified creature. As he searches for the mystery, he faces the dense and deadly jungles, as well as Colombian rebel groups. After extensive fishing leads him to discount all present suspects, Wade makes a startling discovery – stingrays, which he previously believed struck randomly with their deadly barbs, actually aim their barbs and can become embedded in a victim's flesh. When he learns of a similar stingray attack, Wade attempts to catch a ray big enough to have dragged the bride off into the water.
33	"Vampires of the Deep"	12 May 2013	26 May 2013
Featured animals: sea lamprey, Pacific lamprey, longnose gar, bowfin, greater redhorse, Eurasian carp, lake trout Pacific lamprey Wade learns of a series of attacks on swimmers in Lake Champlain and sets off to uncover the truth. After discovering countless fish in the lake bearing the signs of this ancient predator, he learns from a victim that the attacker is the sea lamprey. Unable to catch the fish using a rod and line, Wade offers himself as bait to test the lampreys' abilities and then travels to the Pacific Northwest to catch lamprey by hand with a native tribe. Note: A reference to the events of this episode is made in Blood Lake: Attack of the Killer Lampreys, a 2014 horror film in which Jeremy Wade makes a cameo appearance. His character, a lamprey expert consulted by the film's main character, mentions that he once received a hickey on his neck from a lamprey; in this episode, Wade attached a lamprey to his neck to test its abilities.
Special	"Year of Beasts"	20 May 2013	TBA
Jeremy recounts the exciting adventures of season 5, as he faces never before seen stunts in search of true monsters. Before Jeremy caught radioactive catfish in Chernobyl and killer stingrays in Colombia, he didn't think Season 5 would bring any new or unusual river monsters.
Special	"Top Ten Beasts"	24 May 2013	TBA
In this special edition of River Monsters, extreme angler Jeremy Wade brings together the ten biggest and baddest catches of his career. His battles with them have drawn blood, nearly ripped off his arms and become obsessions.
34	"Legend of Loch Ness"	27 May 2013	TBA
Featured animals: Greenland shark, European eel, Atlantic cod, coalfish, European plaice, haddock, Arctic char, brown trout, Norwegian skate, blackmouth catshark, Atlantic wolffish, bottlenose dolphin, Plesiosaurus, minke whale. Greenland shark For more than 30 years, hardened angler Jeremy Wade has taken on the world's most legendary river monsters but one – the Loch Ness Monster. It's a challenge he's been reluctant to take on … until now. Wade's initial exploration of the loch turns up no signs of a monster, but an ancient folktale directs him to Viking legends and Iceland, where he learns of the Greenland shark, a massive species that inhabits cold, deep water. In Norway, Wade joins a fishing expedition to a deep fjord to catch one of these monstrous sharks. At the end of his punishing journey into the Arctic Circle, Wade catches a Greenland shark and concludes it could possibly have inspired the Loch Ness legend due to its lack of the signature dorsal fin most sharks possess.
Special	"Worst Nightmares"	31 October 2013	TBA
Jeremy relives the encounters that have haunted him over time. Angler Jeremy Wade recalls haunting encounters with freshwater creatures in Vermont, South America and Papua New Guinea.

== Season 6 (2014) ==
No.	Title	Original release date	Unhooked air date
Special	"River Monsters LIVE!"	6 April 2014	TBA
Welcome to River Monsters LIVE! The conversation with Jeremy Wade continues right here, after the Season 6 premiere episode "Amazon Apocalypse" and the first half-hour of the live Aftershow on your TV. Join River Monsters Executive Producer Lisa Lucas as she sits down with our favourite angler to answer every burning question from fans and give intimate insight into the new season to come.
35	"Amazon Apocalypse"	6 April 2014	TBA
Featured animals: redtail catfish, piraiba, silver tetra, red bellied piranha, Ripsaw catfish, candiru-acu, piracatinga, flatwhisker catfish, Black piranha, black caiman, Amazon river dolphin Redtail catfish On a pitch-black night in 1981, over 200 people perished when a passenger boat, the Sobral Santos II, sank in a remote stretch of the Brazilian Amazon, and rumours circulated that something picked off survivors in the water as they attempted to get to shore. More than thirty years later, Wade goes on the hunt to find out exactly what fish was behind this massive attack.
36	"Jungle Terminator"	13 April 2014	TBA
Featured animals: electric eel, red bellied piranha, tiger sorubim, redtail catfish Electric eel Three mysterious deaths in three countries lead Wade to an unlikely suspect. The victims all show signs of burns on their corpses, and the Electric eel is quickly identified as the culprit. Initially reluctant to believe that the eel can inflict such injuries, Wade sets off deep into the jungle to meet a remote tribe with a unique and dangerous method of catching the eel: by hand.
37	"River of Blood"	20 April 2014	TBA
Featured animals: golden dorado, boga, speckled piranha, Spotted sorubim Golden dorado While bathing in a river, a young boy gets brutally mutilated by an unknown assassin. Wade dismisses river stingrays and piranhas, but then a fisherman tells him that the fish which mutilated the boy has stripes on its body. Wade starts to fish, and soon he catches a golden dorado. The fisherman confirm that this is the fish that attacked the boy. Jeremy then travels to the Itaipu Dam, a hydroelectric dam located on the border between Paraguay and Brazil to come face-to-face with one of South America's greatest freshwater fighting fish that slashes and stalks its prey while living in one of Argentina's most dangerous waterways; the Paraná River.
38	"Man-Eating Monster"	4 May 2014	TBA
Featured animals: piraiba, basha, redtail catfish, blinker catfish, dawala, black caiman Piraiba Wade continues his quest to find a monstrous Piraiba catfish (first seen in the Season 1 episode "Amazon Flesh Eaters"), known locally as the Lau-lau, a beast that has eluded him for decades. Having resolved not to leave the Amazon without his quarry this time, Wade faces the elements and remoteness of the Essequibo and ultimately meets his monster, a 250-lb,90-inch Piraiba.
39	"Bone Crusher"	18 May 2014	TBA
Featured animals: green anaconda, smoothback river stingray, redtail catfish Green anaconda When Brazilian locals uncover a corpse with highly unusual injuries and then an increase in missing persons cases are reported, Wade must confront one of his greatest fears to solve the mystery. After discounting all possible suspect fish, he learns that the culprit is something far out of his element – the anaconda. With his usual methods useless to track down this monster, Wade must trek into the anaconda's lair himself to prove that they can grow to man-eating size.
Special	"Monster-Hunting Secrets"	18 May 2014	TBA
In this special episode of River Monsters, Jeremy Wade reveals his own hard-won trade secrets: the tactics and techniques that help him land the biggest and most unpredictable fresh-water predators. Jeremy shows how using the wrong rod to catch a giant stingray in Thailand taught him a valuable lesson, the hard way! He demonstrates the line he used to bring in a man-eating piraiba in Brazil; how catching the fearsome Goliath tigerfish on the Congo River required a special rig of hooks; and how the torpedo-like Atlantic tarpon in Nicaragua demanded a radical approach. But how did he manage to bring up the elusive Greenland shark from a depth greater than the height of the Empire State Building?
Special	"Killer Mysteries"	20 May 2014	TBA
In this special episode of River Monsters, Jeremy Wade relives some of the toughest and most baffling cases of his career. He turns detective to unravel the truth behind the mysterious legend of an ancient child killer in Japan and devises an experiment to finally reveal the killer of a young bride in Colombia. In some cases, it's not the fish but the location itself that becomes his greatest adversary. In The Republic of the Congo, Jeremy fears for his own life in his hunt to track down a river monster. In the Amazon, he faces his most daunting challenge, putting himself directly in the firing line to prove that a perpetrator with no motive belongs to that sinister line-up of fresh-water killers.
Special	"Lethal Encounters"	21 May 2014	TBA
Jeremy Wade has placed himself in more danger than he cares to remember during his 30 years of travelling the globe. In this special edition of River Monsters, Jeremy relives some of his scariest encounters and looks back at the cases that took him to the brink of disaster in the most hostile environments on the planet. Whether he encounters a plane crash, a lightning bolt, a predator with an invisible weapon or a radioactive landscape, Jeremy reveals how the hunt for a true river monster can take him to death's door at any moment.
Special	"American Horrors"	22 May 2014	TBA
For three decades, Jeremy Wade has travelled the world to find the biggest and most fearsome river monsters on the planet. But not all monsters live in remote jungles – there are fearsome fish much closer to home. In this special edition of River Monsters, Jeremy relives the biggest and most surprising catches of his career, right in America's backyard. Jeremy reveals the powerful and potentially lethal fish that lurk across much of the United States, before he exposes its most destructive and devastating monster of all, an ancient fish that threatens to take over America's largest bodies of fresh water.
40	"Body Snatcher"	26 May 2014	TBA
Featured animals: arapaima, redtail catfish, black piranha Arapaima Wade learns of a water-dwelling killer in the remote jungles of Guyana that is blamed for the disappearances of many victims. The creature, nicknamed the "water mama" by locals, is described as a real-life mermaid. Setting off deep into the jungle to find out what could possibly have inspired such a legend, Wade finds himself once again doing battle with his greatest adversary, the arapaima. Not only are the arapaima in the area far bigger and more aggressive than those he has ever battled before, they are illegal to fish for. Through contact with a local chief, Wade manages to secure permission to fish for arapaima, but must do so in a way he has never done before – by fly fishing. Feeling outgunned due to this handicap, Wade soon finds himself locked in combat with the largest arapaima he has ever caught.

== Season 7 (2015) ==
No.	Title	Original release date	Unhooked air date
41	"Canadian Horror"	5 April 2015	TBA
Featured animals: muskellunge, lake trout, northern pike, smallmouth bass, green anaconda, white sturgeon, bull shark, Common snapping turtle Muskellunge Ontario locals tell unbelievable tales of a stealthy, 20-foot serpent lurking in Canada's expansive waters. Jeremy seeks to find the reason why boaters and fisherman are vanishing into thin air. The accused beast is described as a giant eel-like serpent and a fruitless search for this elusive predator sends Jeremy close to the edge. With widespread accounts of a large, shadowy snake-like fish that attacks humans, Wade is in search of a powerful monster built for speed. After ruling out sturgeon, freshwater sharks, and giant snakes, Jeremy determines, based on witness testimonies of sightings and attacks, that the most likely candidate is the muskellunge. He recognises that the muskie fits the description of the lake monster in every aspect but one: size. Later, Jeremy discovers the 20-foot-long, serpent-like shapes that had been witnessed can be explained by the behaviour of spawning muskellunge which swim in lines of multiple fish. Now that Wade has determined the muskie as the perpetrator of the attacks and the identity of the infamous lake monster, he must catch one. After nearly 13,000 casts, his determination borders on obsession as he waits for just one fated bite. Multiple setbacks and volatile weather have Jeremy looking to native spirits for a boost in confidence. At his wits' end and ready to give up his search for the first time in the history of the program, Jeremy halfheartedly attempts to catch a small fish to restore his confidence, only to accidentally find his target and get locked in battle with a giant muskellunge while using gear that is too weak for the job. After a tense battle, Jeremy miraculously manages to catch and release the 50+ inch muskellunge, which was caught using 6 lb test monofilament line.
42	"Mekong Mutilator"	12 April 2015	TBA
Featured animals: Fang's puffer,Asian redtail catfish,Mekong giant catfish, giant barb, giant snakehead, Cantor's giant softshell turtle Mekong river Jeremy ventures to the Mekong River in Cambodia after receiving a disturbing report of a bloody attack by a toothy predator that has sliced clean through a young man's testicle, similar to the pacu and golden dorado attacks he previously investigated. This river is said to harbour more giant fish than anywhere else in the world and Jeremy's research turns up multiple victims who have been mauled, blinded, and even fatally wounded in its bountiful waters. And the telltale wounds show that the same mysterious assailant is to blame. After weeks of fishing with few leads and – after ruling out softshell turtles, Mekong giant catfish and others – no reasonable trail to follow, mounting clues carry Jeremy to a deceptively calm spot along the river where river monsters aren't the only threat to swimmers. Explosives left over from the Vietnam War may still be hidden in its depths and on the surrounding banks, so Jeremy must take each step and cast with care. Later, Jeremy's boatman shows him a skeleton of a small fish, revealing the monster's identity to be the deceptively cute freshwater pufferfish, which has been using its four teeth to slice through flesh like a pair of scissors on the Mekong River. Wade even explores one case where the victim bled to death after being bitten on his leg. After venturing to the largest freshwater lake in Southeast Asia, Jeremy abandons his modern fishing gear for a net and fishes with locals, placing him head-to-head against this small yet deadly opponent. After capturing several of the pufferfish, Wade determines that the waters of the lake are teeming with this small, aggressive fish, because they are not kept for food by the locals. The puffer's extremely defensive behaviour has made attacks almost unavoidable on the lake, and Jeremy witnesses how frequently they occur by talking to the locals.
43	"Prehistoric Terror"	19 April 2015	TBA
Featured animals: Xenacanthus, alligator gar, Xiphactinus, Indo-Pacific sailfish, Leedsichthys, whale shark, Megapiranha, red bellied piranha, Helicoprion, Dunkleosteus, white sturgeon, Rhizodus, saltwater crocodile Dunkleosteus Wade calls on the same instincts he uses to catch living monsters to uncover the most deadly underwater giants of all time. He must read the water (and in some cases the land) for clues to bring long-forgotten beasts to light. Using Wade's keen understanding of modern-day monsters, top scientific discoveries and state-of-the-art CGI, the apex killers of the prehistoric era such as the 25-foot, buzz saw-toothed Helicoprion and the bone-crushing Dunkleosteus, come to life as ancient monsters are featured on River Monsters for the first time. His goal is to determine the greatest river monster of all time. Jeremy begins by investigating the Xenacanthus, and catches the modern day fish, the alligator gar, as a reminder of the hardware on this ancient freshwater shark. Next, Jeremy investigates the Xiphactinus, and catches a sailfish in the Indian Ocean as a reminder of the speed of this massive meat-eating fish. Then, Jeremy looks into the Leedsichthys, the largest fish of all time. Swimming with whale sharks, he gets a sense of the immense size of this ancient beast. However, he must rule it off his list, because this massive fish was a filter feeder, not a predator. Later, Wade investigates the "Mega-piranha", but rules it off of his list, because of lack of evidence for its ferocity. Next, he investigates the Helicoprion, or "buzz sawed killer", but he rules it off his list, because its teeth do not have the ability to break through bone. Then, he turns his attention to the Dunkleosteus, which did have the size and dental hardware necessary to crunch through bone. Jeremy catches a white sturgeon in Canada to observe its bone plated body, reminiscent of the "Bone Crusher". However, Wade thinks he has found the greatest river monster of all time when he hears of the Rhizodont, an ancient freshwater predator the size of a killer whale. To attain a sense of the monstrosity of the Rhizodont, Jeremy visits a massive saltwater crocodile in captivity. After observing the size and strength of this predator and recognising that the Rhizodont must have been even larger than the crocodile, Jeremy comes to the conclusion that the Rhizodont must be the greatest river monster that has ever existed on planet Earth.
Special	"Jeremy's Favorite Moments 1"	26 April 2015	TBA
Jeremy looks back on his encounter in the Congo River with the notorious Goliath tiger fish.
Special	"Jeremy's Favorite Moments 2"	26 April 2015	TBA
Jeremy looks back on his journey to South Africa in search of a monstrous freshwater shark.
44	"Alaska's Cold Water Killer"	26 April 2015	TBA
Featured animals: Pacific halibut, Chinook salmon, salmon shark, china rockfish, lingcod Pacific halibut Jeremy Wade has been investigating mysterious freshwater disappearances for 30 years, often revealing the strange and sometimes deadly creatures beneath the surface. Recent reports of fishermen vanishing without a trace on Alaska's south coast leads Jeremy to America's Last Frontier, with its ice-capped mountains, wild rivers, and isolated coves. Alaska holds spectacular scenery, but its remote lands and harsh climates make it treacherous. Jeremy searches for the culprit of a case involving a boat washing up on the inter tidal zone along the coast without the fisherman and their rods. Jeremy decides to look in both fresh and saltwater for potential culprits. After looking in freshwater, Jeremy finds himself on a treacherous hunt for one fish he's never hooked before – the mighty king salmon. After catching a good-sized male salmon, Jeremy concludes that this powerful fish could be responsible for some of the reported disappearances. Its strength can result in fisherman and spear-fishermen being pulled into the water and drowned. However, he doesn't think it could explain the abandoned boat case. When the investigation shifts to salt water, Jeremy finds himself in shark-infested waters, observing the salmon shark. Jeremy makes himself shark bait to prove that these fish won't attack a human – even if that human is diving right into the middle of their feeding frenzy. After ruling out the salmon shark as the culprit, Jeremy hears of one more predator, the Pacific halibut. He investigates several cases where this fish had harmed or even killed people trying to catch one. Jeremy concludes that the halibut is the most likely candidate of the abandoned boat case and many of the other reports, and sets out to catch and release this dangerous fish in freshwater.
Special	"Jeremy's Favorite Moments 3"	3 May 2015	TBA
Jeremy looks back on the time he learned the gruesome truth about a Mongolian killer fish.
Special	"Jeremy's Favorite Moments 4"	3 May 2015	TBA
Jeremy relives his journey through the Amazon rainforest in search of a legendary creature said to swallow men whole.
Special	"Jeremy's Favorite Moments 5"	10 May 2015	TBA
Jeremy Wade looks back on a mysterious man-eating eight-foot beast said to be legend over 200-years old.
Special	"Jeremy's Favorite Moments 6"	10 May 2015	TBA
Jeremy Wade looks back on his mission to track down the famous monster of Loch Ness.
45	"South Pacific Terrors"	10 May 2015	TBA
Featured animals: giant mottled eel, giant trevally, narrow-barred Spanish mackerel, spot-fin porcupinefish, bull shark, saltwater crocodile Giant trevally Giant mottled eel Wade travels to Fiji, having received several varying reports of brutal attacks in the tropical nation. Investigating a death in which the victim's body was badly bruised, he quickly receives a positive ID on the culprit, the giant trevally. To prove that this fish can grow large, powerful, and daring enough to kill a human with its shark-killing battering strength, Jeremy must fish above a coral reef that threatens to cut his line at any time. Eventually, he manages to hook one of these bruisers and brings it in on rod and reel after a gruelling battle. Jeremy concludes the trevally might feel threatened, so it uses its battering ram like head to slam humans that wander too close. After resolving the trevally case, however, Jeremy realises that the other death that he heard of before coming to Fiji must be the fault of a different culprit, as it occurred too far inland for the giant trevally to reach. He hears of several other inland cases and begins to investigate. Jeremy knows the island is home to large, little-known giant mottled eel and tries to catch one in the reservoir location of one of the attacks, but comes out empty handed. Unsure if the giant mottled eel is the culprit, he travels to a remote region deep in the mountainous Fijian jungles. Wade learns that the culprit is known to the locals who have additional attack reports of the creature, but their name for it is not something he recognises. Jeremy dives into a deep section of the river said to be home to a monster fish, but still does not witness it. After securing permission to fish in the river from the village elders, Jeremy waits for hours, well into the night, and eventually catches the confirmed killer, which is indeed the giant mottled eel. After observing the 5-foot long eel, Jeremy concludes that the many attacks in Fiji were the work of both fish: the giant trevally at the river mouth and coastal regions, and the giant mottled eel in the inland sections. He also concludes that these fish were both practising their very easily agitated defensive behaviours.
Special	"Jeremy's Favorite Moments 7"	17 May 2015	TBA
Jeremy looks back on his European quest in search of an aggressive man-eating predator.
Special	"Jeremy's Favorite Moments 8"	17 May 2015	TBA
Jeremy reflects on the Central American quest that took him to the breaking point.
46	"Africa's Deadliest"	17 May 2015	TBA
Featured animals: African tigerfish, blackspotted squeaker, humpback largemouth, vundu catfish, Nile crocodile, African fish eagle Nile crocodile Once again, Jeremy Wade tackles one of the largest fresh water systems on earth – the Okavango Delta in Botswana. Of all the river monsters he has encountered throughout his travels, Wade is after a suspected man-eater that still gets under his skin. This time, the delta is running high and clear, making the fish more spread out. After getting his hands on some of these tigerfish, Jeremy decides that to truly get to know this fish, he must confront these aggressive pack hunters face-to-face in their own environment. An African river poses many deadly threats and few humans would dare break the surface, much less dive into its dark depths. But Jeremy willingly makes himself human bait, diving 40 feet underwater, in hopes of finding a pack of hungry tigerfish – to prove that these giants hunt in groups like piranha. Meanwhile, convicted man-eaters, African crocodiles, swim nearby. On his first dive, Jeremy encounters a large crocodile that is inactive due to the cool temperature of the water. Jeremy even places his hand on this large reptile's tail. On his second dive, Jeremy finds himself in a massive underwater labyrinth, and eventually manages to spot a large school of tigerfish. However, the tigerfish keep their distance, and Jeremy gets out of the water. The water starts to turn warmer, and with that comes increased crocodile activity, which could spell trouble for Jeremy and his dive team. On his third dive, Jeremy hand feeds a school of hungry tigerfish, who come within feet of him. However, the tigerfish are not interested on feeding on him. After emerging from the water, Jeremy concludes that when the water is clear, the tigerfish can see their targets more clearly and are not likely to attack humans. But when the water drops and becomes more murky, the tigerfish attacks are much more likely to occur.
Special	"South American Killers"	17 May 2015	TBA
Extreme angler, Jeremy Wade, is on the hunt for freshwater fish with a taste for human flesh. This rip-roaring ride through the dark side of nature mixes action and adventure with mysteries, edge of the seat chase and a battle of wills between man and almost supernatural beasts who lurk in the serpentine waterways of the planet, mooching murderously underwater, growing to truly awesome sizes. Watch as Jeremy Wade deconstructs exactly how these river monsters are constructed to kill.
Special	"Canadian Horror – Alternate Cut"	17 May 2015	TBA
From Canada's waterlogged wilderness come stories of a twenty-foot lake monster that attacks humans. Freshwater detective Jeremy Wade tries to track down this shadowy predator with a mouth said to resemble a bear-trap. Features the extinct whale Basilosaurus cetoides.
Special	"Killer Treasures"	18 May 2015	TBA
Jeremy shows off various treasures he has acquired – from lucky charms to penis sheaths; from knife-proof gloves to yak-skin; Jeremy shares the bizarre stories behind each one.
Special	"Size Matters"	19 May 2015	TBA
Jeremy looks back on seven specific blockbuster catches with the largest and scariest beasts of his career.
Special	"African Horrors"	20 May 2015	TBA
Jeremy relives his encounters with record-breaking sharks and a super-sized Congo tiger-fish in African waters.
Special	"Jurassic-Sized Prehistoric Terror"	24 May 2015	TBA
Featured animals: Xenacanthus, alligator gar, Xiphactinus, Indo-Pacific sailfish, Leedsichthys, whale shark, Megapiranha, red bellied piranha, Helicoprion, Pacific hagfish, spotted ratfish, Dunkleosteus, white sturgeon, Rhizodus, Queensland lungfish, saltwater crocodile This extended two-hour special of "Prehistoric Terror" features new footage of Jeremy investigating prehistoric monsters and their modern day counterparts.

== Season 8 (2016) ==
Promoted as a special season under the title River Monsters: Mysteries of the Ocean, this season sees Jeremy Wade shift his focus from freshwater to oceanic fish.

No.	Title	Original release date	Unhooked air date
Special	"Into the Ocean"	7 April 2016	TBA
In this special episode, Jeremy charts the journey that has taken him from freshwater rivers into the heart of the big blue and revisits the extraordinary and deadly monsters he has encountered along the way.
47	"Deep Sea Demon"	7 April 2016	TBA
Featured animals: Salp, Common ling, European conger, Moray eel, Atlantic horseshoe crab, Stomatopoda, Giant oarfish Moray eel Moving his quest for monster fish to the world's oceans, Jeremy Wade seeks the truth behind one of the most enduring legends of all time: the sea serpent. His search initially begins locally in his home of England with a man's horrifying story of being attacked by a conger eel while diving. However, after fishing off the British coast and catching one, Wade is able to discount the conger eel due to its lacking of common characteristics with the sea serpent. Next, Wade travels to Thailand, where the serpentine Nāga is widely seen as a deity. Using the Nāga as a base for his search, Wade learns of multiple attacks on humans by the moray eel. He joins a local tribe who traditionally hunt these eels, and though they find morays with great size and monstrous behaviour, Wade is not completely convinced that the moray eel is the sea serpent. While investigating the Nāga further, Wade meets a monk whose temple holds an alleged photograph of the real-life Nāga; in an instant, his quest changes, as the picture is of a creature he had never even considered – the oarfish. Immediately seeing the similarities between the oarfish and Nāga, Wade searches for a way to encounter this rarely-seen fish, eventually coming into contact with a diver in France who encountered one during a dive. Despite the mortal risk posed by diving in the vast, deep waters, Wade attempts the dive, only to find himself unable to last underwater. As his time for ideal conditions to make the dive runs out, he decides to take a night dive and try again. During the dive, not one but two oarfish appear, coming so close that Wade can touch them. As a result, Wade becomes one of the very few people in history to witness a live, healthy oarfish.
48	"Death Down Under"	14 April 2016	TBA
Giant grouper Wade investigates the deaths of six men whose plane crashed in the northern seas of Australia, with only a single severed leg left behind on a beach as evidence. First, he looks into the most obvious possible culprit, the tiger shark, only to find that tiger sharks do not generally attack humans unless mistaking them for other animals, such as turtles. The Giant grouper is similarly ruled out, as it is typically an ambush predator on the seafloor. Saltwater crocodiles come into focus, but they also could not be the sole culprit because they do not typically go far out to sea. Wade learns that the men actually made it to the beach, meaning whatever killed them struck on the shore, and the bodies were likely subsequently dismembered by crocodiles. He discovers a new candidate: the stonefish, a small, camouflaged fish that can deliver a deadly venom if stepped on. This could explain one of the deaths, but unlikely all six. Finally, Wade discovers the most likely killer of the bulk of the men – the box jellyfish, a nearly invisible creature with the most deadly venom on the planet. While working with a scientist who studies these bizarre and dangerous creatures, Wade suffers a minor sting but recovers to capture a box jellyfish with his bare hands.
49	"Razorhead"	21 April 2016	TBA
Featured animals: Great barracuda, Pacific cubera snapper, Lemon shark. Southern stingray Great barracuda Wade travels to the Florida Keys, where an ocean kayaker was torn open by an attacker that leapt from the water, cracking her ribs and puncturing a lung. After meeting the victim, who survived the attack, he deduces that sharks were not responsible. Meeting local fishermen reveals a second incident, in which a fisherman working on his dock had his foot sliced open. Fishing in the area reveals no monsters, so Wade leaves and returns to fishing in the ocean, where he lands a small barracuda. Suspecting the barracuda may be the attacker, he seeks out further information and learns that barracuda can cut through flesh and bone with minimal actual biting thanks to their great speed and body shape. Furthermore, they are known to leap from the water and have been documented attacking people in a similar fashion to the attack on the kayaker. Wade dives to bait out barracuda in their natural environment, observing their speed and accuracy when hunting. Armed with this knowledge, Wade lands a series of large barracuda, culminating in a showdown with a barracuda big enough to break bone out of water.
Special	"Deadly Superstitions"	28 April 2016	TBA
Wade revisits some of his previous adventures and investigates the spiritual and mythological events behind them. Featured episodes: "Body Snatcher" – Jeremy offers his own flesh to termites, hoping to appease Guyanese water spirits in his quest to catch a monster arapaima by fly fishing.; "Pack of Teeth" – In Botswana, Jeremy gets the blessing of a witch doctor for luck while searching for the African tigerfish, a creature known as the ndweshi and feared by the highly superstituous locals.; "Man-Eating Monster" – While searching for the Lau-lau, a highly dangerous catfish, in Guyana, Jeremy takes part in an unusual ritual for protection from demons to earn the trust of local leaders and his guides.; "Asian Slayer" – Identifying this, his search for the sareng catfish in India, as his worst River Monsters shoot ever, Jeremy recalls how everything that could go wrong did when he went up against warnings that trying to catch the sareng would bring nothing but bad luck.; "Mongolian Mauler" – Looking to fulfill his childhood dream of catching a large taimen, Jeremy runs afoul of superstitions, dangerous animals and violent gangs while searching for the near-extinct fish in Mongolia. His guide calls in a shaman who agrees to summon a spirit to aid Jeremy's quest.; "Canadian Horror" – Reports of a horrifying serpent-like creature bring Jeremy to Ontario, where locals make an offering of tobacco to appease the water spirits. His quest drives him to madness as he desperately searches for the fish responsible for the story, the muskellunge, until his own offering of tobacco and a remarkable turn of chance brings him and the fish together at the most unlikely of times.
50	"Terror in Paradise"	5 May 2016	TBA
Giant Pacific octopus Wade travels to Andros, Bahamas after hearing stories of swimmers and divers disappearing with no evidence ever recovered. The disappearances are said to centre around blue holes, including an eight-year-old boy being snatched from the surface while playing with friends in one. Locals immediately identify the attacker as a legendary monster called the lusca, an alleged giant that is said to be half shark, half octopus. Believing a shark to be the true culprit after seeing a lemon shark near the entrance to one of the tunnels connecting the sea to a blue hole, Wade joins a shark research team on a remote island. Wade manages to catch a reef shark before diving among them, then gets up close and personal with a large tiger shark captured by the researchers. However, the tiger shark quickly leaves after being released, prompting Wade to rethink his approach to the mystery. He begins to investigate the octopus half of the lusca legend, realising that octopuses – which lack bones – could easily navigate the narrow tunnels between the ocean and the blue holes, a feat impossible for a large shark. Wade travels to Puget Sound, where he meets a man who survived a terrifying octopus attack after disturbing it while picking up sea cucumbers. Now convinced that his target is a giant octopus, Wade dives to investigate Puget Sound and has a startling encounter with a giant Pacific octopus, observing that when an octopus begins swimming instead of "walking" on the seabed, it could easily be mistaken for a hybrid of shark and octopus. This and the extreme flexibility that octopuses possess, potentially allowing them to navigate the tunnels to the blue holes, lead Wade to conclude the lusca legend is at least partially true and the blue hole attacks were carried out by a monstrous octopus.
Special	"Invisible Killers"	12 May 2016	TBA
After several of his crew members suffer parasitic infections during their shoots, Jeremy decides to submit himself for testing by a prestigious Liverpool medical lab. While awaiting the results of his tests, he travels to the Amazon to look into various types of parasites he may have fallen victim to.
Special	"Killer Discoveries"	19 May 2016	TBA
Jeremy revisits some of the many scientific projects he has worked with over his career and presents new information discovered since his time with the researchers. Featured episodes: "Phantom Assassin"; "Legend of Loch Ness"; "Cold Blooded Horror"; "Death Ray"
51	"Devil of the Deep"	26 May 2016	TBA
Humboldt squid Reports of the corpses of five fishermen being found with strange mutilations, allegedly caused by a mysterious sea creature, bring Jeremy to Mexico. Attempting to track down the alleged marine biologist who supposedly studied the corpses proves fruitless, but soon more stories of such attacks in the Sea of Cortez emerge. Local fishermen are unable to provide information on the initial five deaths, but describe other victims suffering similar wounds from attacks in deep trenches. Initial fishing in the trenches reveal Atlantic bonito tuna, which Jeremy uses in the hopes of finding a larger fish, however something bites the tuna and leader clean off Jeremy's line. A second tuna is sliced completely apart aside from the head, leading Jeremy to believe a shark is biting his lines, but sharks have already been discounted in the mystery due to the lack of their signature bite marks on the bodies. Suddenly, one of Jeremy's lines is taken, and he reels in a striped marlin. While marlin have been known to kill fishermen when captured, they only leave one wound, not the numerous ones reported on the corpses. Later, at the docks, Jeremy is confused by the complete lack of sharks within the fishermen's catch. A fisherman tells Jeremy that if he wants to learn the truth about the area he must visit a place described as a cemetery. The location turns out to be littered with skeletons of dead fish, and Jeremy discovers multiple mutilated shark corpses, leading him to believe that criminals may be illegally fishing for them. A local man confirms the decline of sharks in the area and claims a predator dubbed "The Red Devil" has invaded the local waters. After considering and discarding whales and manta rays, Jeremy becomes intrigued if the Red Devil may have a real-life connection to the mythological Kraken, which is sometimes described as a "devil fish". A fisherman who once tried to capture the Red Devil and was attacked by them displays a wound similar to the wounds inflicted by the puffer fish Jeremy investigated previously, then confirms that the Red Devil is indeed a squid, but then claims that they fled the area just as quickly as they appeared. Concluding that the Red Devil is the Humboldt squid, Jeremy learns that they are presently being caught in Peru. In Peru, Jeremy joins a group of professional squid fishermen. They travel for days to reach the deep seas where the squid can be found, bringing Jeremy and the crew great stress, and Jeremy's nerves only worsen when he realises how easy it would be to fall overboard and be dragged under by converging squid. Despite his fears, Jeremy manages to catch multiple Humboldt squid, witnessing their deadly weaponry and vicious behaviour. With no evidence, Jeremy is forced to conclude that the initial story of the five dead fisherman was a hoax, but the Humboldt squid attacks were very real.
Special	"Secrets at Sea"	2 June 2016	TBA
Extreme angler Jeremy Wade heads into new territory – the open ocean. Go behind the scenes as Jeremy and his crew face stormy seas, deep-water dives, dangerous creatures and extreme hardship as they produce an entire season at sea.
Special	"North American Nightmares"	19 December 2016	TBA
Jeremy Wade revisits some monster encounters in North America from the brackish channels of Florida to the freezing waters of Alaska. On the way, he encounters treacherous bull sharks, much-feared alligator gars and nearly 500 pound halibuts.
Special	"Africa's Assassins"	26 December 2016	TBA
Jeremy relives monstrous moments in Africa from the Okavango Delta to the Zambezi and Congo Rivers.
Special	"Deadliest Amazon Encounters"	26 December 2016	TBA
The waters of the Amazon hide venomous giant stingrays, bone crushing anacondas, and colossal catfish that are said to swallow men whole.

== Season 9 (2017) ==
This season was dubbed "the final season", as it is the last season of River Monsters.

No.	Title	Original release date	Unhooked air date
52	"Killers From The Abyss"	23 April 2017	TBA
Featured animals: skipjack tuna, Mahi-mahi, barracuda, snoek, bluntnose sixgill shark, oceanic whitetip shark, tiger shark, cookiecutter shark, brown fur seal, dolphin, isopod, pig Six-gill shark Wade takes on the biggest investigation of his career, solving what happened to over 1,500 passengers of the RMS Laconia, torpedoed in the mid-Atlantic in 1942. After looking into eye-witness reports, Wade is granted permission to access parts of Ascension Island, the nearest landmass to where the Laconia went down, and had launched B-24 Liberators to attack the U-boats during the Laconia incident. Wade fishes near Ascension island, first catching a skipjack tuna, and then a dorado. Dorado are powerful predators, but Wade does not believe that they could be responsible for the passengers who were killed during the Laconia incident. Wade digs up eye-witness reports that tell of strange silvery fish perpetrating the first attacks. Wade mentions one particular account about a man who managed to escape from the sinking Laconia, and was dangling his bare feet over the life raft when he felt an excruciating pain, resulting in him promptly removing his feet from the water. Wade combines aggression with colour, and suspects the snoek of drawing first blood. However, snoeks do not live around Ascension Island at the time he was there, so Wade travels to South Africa, where he begins to fish in the sea around Cape Town. His boat is in the way of what looks like a massive storm, so he feels like he must hurry. The sonar in the boat detects a massive school of fish; Wade estimates that it could contain over a thousand, so he casts his line. He is fishing in the vicinity of large seals and potential snoek, so any fish struggling on the end of a line would be a choice target for these predators. Wade reels in the line quickly, revealing a snoek on the hook. He is convinced that snoek were involved in the attack, but French research vessels found victims with strange circular wounds on their bodies. These wounds have been seen on fish frequently in the area, and it appears that there is a small but aggressive predator in these waters, the cookiecutter shark. This shark is usually less than two feet long, but it possesses sharp teeth. Wade concludes that cookie cutter sharks also played their part in the Laconia incident. However, Wade feels like this does not entirely conclude his investigation. After Wade nearly catches a tiger shark, he believes that tiger sharks must have also been on the scene. However, Wade states that tiger sharks do not live in large enough numbers to be entirely responsible. Wade concludes that noise in the water attracts predatory sharks, so he travels to a cove, where he drops food into the water for small fish. Soon, sharks show up on the scene. Wade also notes that there was a huge sonic boom when the super heated metal of the boilers hit the water. Some sharks may have been attracted to the sound. Wade mentions the oceanic whitetip shark, a predator that would have been in the area in large numbers at the time of the Laconia disaster. However, in the 1950s, commercial shark fishing became an industry, and the common whitetip reef shark was put on the endangered list. Wade travels to the Bahamas, where there is still a healthy supply of oceanic whitetip sharks. Wade travels in a canoe, and then drops something playing a very low frequency sound into the water. Soon, he is stalked by a lone whitetip. Wade doubts that a single whitetip could have played a significant part in the disaster, but before long there is around three sharks stalking Wade. Wade begins to feel less comfortable, because they show interest in the sound machine as well as him. Eventually, the sharks depart. Wade believes that the fish he has encountered explain most of the unfortunate passengers, but not entirely all of them. Eye-witnesses report seeing people dragged vertically down into the water by an unknown sea creature. Wade also finds more recent reports of mysterious enormous sharks being hauled up by large ships in this region. Wade is convinced that there is another predator involved, that has the power to drag a person vertically down. Wade joins a team of scientists attempting to catch this enormous animal. Wade is the team's angler. Wade eventually gets a bite, and he attempts to pull the fish towards him. He manages to catch the fish, which is a fourteen-foot six-gilled shark. The six-gilled shark is a deep sea predator, and this one weighs close to 1,100 pounds. The scientists tag the shark, and then release it. Wade learns from the scientists that this is the first time a six-gilled shark has ever been tagged in this region. Wade is satisfied that he has caught his largest fish to date, but he is not convinced that a predator that lives thousands of feet beneath the surface could be responsible for the surface-level attacks. The next morning, Wade gets a call from one of the scientists, saying that the shark moved up to near the surface over the night, and returned to the depths in the day. Now, Wade believes that he has found the final predator involved in the Laconia disaster. First the snoek drew predators like tiger sharks and whitetip sharks, then the cookie cutter sharks came, attracted by the attention, and finally the six-gilled sharks arrived on the scene. Now, Wade wants to see a six-gilled shark in its own environment. Wade travels to the Cayman Trench, where a homemade submarine has been built. Wade hopes that this can take him to the environment of the six-gilled shark. Despite having a couch in its interior, Wade is still not comfortable with how cramped the submarine is. The submarine has a pig on the front for bait. Wade and the driver descend to the black smokers, 2000 feet below the surface, and where the water pressure is 900 pounds per square inch. Here they turn their lights to red, where they wait for a shark. Sharks cannot see red light. They are precariously placed on a precipice that drops down several more miles. Wade notes that if something were to happen to them here, there would be no one to save them. They wait for several hours watching isopods and other extremely deep sea creatures crawling around. Eventually, they see a six-gilled shark. It circles them a few times, and although it cannot see them, it appears to be able to smell them. It eventually seizes the pig, and departs. After seeing the power of the six-gilled shark, Wade thinks that these predators may have played their part in the Laconia incident, as well as the other large predatory fish.: Note: In the aftershow of the episode, "Volcanic Island Terror", Wade said that while filming this episode, he hooked a yellowfin tuna that took around six hours to bring in. It was also the longest fight Wade ever had with a fish (the second longest being the short-tail river stingray in the episode, "Silent Assassin").
53	"Ice Cold Killer"	30 April 2017	TBA
Featured animals: Greenland shark, Atlantic cod, Atlantic halibut, Rose fish, Cusk, dog, seagull Greenland shark Jeremy Wade hears of a mysterious case of a Greenland shark washing up on a beach in Northumberland, England. Jeremy then wonders if this fish will attack people. He first travels to Greenland, where he participates in several ice fishing expeditions. These reveal cod and skate, but no large predator. Wade then locates a man who wants to catch a Greenland shark to feed his pack of sled dogs. Wade and the Greenland shark fisherman break a hole in the ice and deploy a long line. Wade stays overnight at the man's house, a traditional custom in the area that ensures that no one will go hungry. The next morning, they reach the long line and pull it up revealing a Greenland shark that probably died over the previous night. Wade finds some interesting stomach contents inside the Greenland shark. Wade then travels to Northern Europe, where he learns interesting facts about the Greenland shark. Greenland sharks are estimated to live up to 400 years, and Wade notes that some elderly Greenland sharks alive today would have been swimming in the ocean at the same time as the Mayflower. Although greenland sharks are known as "sleeper sharks" and they also have a very lethargic reputation. A man that dived with a greenland shark near Canada observed how greenland sharks sometimes double back on divers, and exhibit predatory curiosity. He joins a team of scientists searching for a greenland shark in Norway. Scientists predict that at this time of year, greenland sharks will congregate in this area. The day starts out clear, but soon it reveals telltale signs of An approaching Arctic storm. Wade wants to catch a greenland shark in the daytime, so he can see it better than he did in his previous episode featuring this animal in Season 5, where he caught one weighing roughly 400 pounds in the night. He observes a submarine and wonders about how the environment of the greenland shark is like. He eventually gets a hook, where he reels in an adolescent weighing about 250 pounds, 7 feet long, and roughly 40-years old. The shark is thrashing around on the surface, and it is acting more like a great white than a greenland shark. This makes Wade question how lethargic the greenland shark really is. The weather eventually grows worse, and Wade feels like he must hurry. When he gets his next bite, he puts on a fishing harness and one of the scientists grabs a handle on the back of the harness. He manages to bring it in, and it is 10 feet long and roughly 700 pounds. Based on its length and weight, Wade and the scientists estimate that it is 200 years old. The team tags the shark and release it. Wade concludes the episode by reminding viewers that it is still not known whether the Greenland shark poses a threat to humans, and a greenland shark washing up on a beach in England may be a noteworthy event.
Special	"Monster Scars"	30 April 2017	TBA
Extreme angler Jeremy Wade talks about some of the injuries he has had over the years filming River Monsters.
54	"Coral Reef Killer"	7 May 2017	TBA
Featured animals: black marlin, needlefish, Bluespotted stingray Needlefish On the coral reef off the tropical island of Sulawesi, Indonesia, a tourist snorkeller was impaled and killed by an unseen assailant. Wade snorkels around the coral reef, but sees nothing over a few inches long. He then tracks down someone who was attacked and impaled through his boat by a marlin. Wade then tries to catch a marlin, to determine which species it is. He tries to catch a marlin on a handline. When he hooks his first fish, it easily throws the hook. He then hooks onto another marlin, which he battles with for around an hour. He finally gets it in close to his boat, when it spits out the hook and escapes. However, Wade is able to identify it as a black marlin. He notes that the snorkeller must have been killed through her goggles as well as her skull, and the black marlin has the power to do that. Wade also tracks down a man that is familiar with the marlin. However, when Wade talks to him about the attack on the snorkeller, he says that it would not be possible for a fish as large as a black marlin to enter water that shallow. Marlin are known to go into shallow water, unlike a lot of large fish. However, the place where the attack on the snorkeller happened was far too shallow for them. Wade then notes that stingrays have also stabbed people to death, and they have attacked swimmers as well. Although stingrays usually stick to the seafloor, it could have been responsible. Wade guesses that the perpetrator had a similar feature to the stingray's barb. He then talks to a marine biologist who is highly familiar with stingrays. The marine biologist concludes that it was not a stingray, because it would cause the area around the wound to change colour to a purple, green or blue. Wade is frustrated, when he talks to some residents about a fish that has been attacking people by impaling them. They do not give Wade a name he recognises, but when he travels with them on a night fishing trip, he is able to see a strange silvery fish of around three feet in length that quickly jumps out of the water and disappears from sight. Wade also meets the victim's family, who show Wade a piece of jewellery that she was wearing the day she was attacked. Wade suspects that the jewellery startled the fish, and it leaped out of the water at the jewellery. And he is told that the victim's husband called her, causing her to move her head above the surface and remove her goggles, which may have protected her. Wade dives again, this time using a stick with a shiny object on the end. It soon attracts several needlefish. Needlefish match all of the descriptions of the predator, and Wade concludes that needlefish are the most likely culprit. He then catches a needlefish, and points out its sharp snout. Wade finishes the episode by stating that not all dangerous fish are large, and some extremely dangerous fish, like needlefish and piranha, can be deadly like their larger counterparts.
Special	"Don't Try this at Home"	7 May 2017	TBA
Jeremy Wade talks about some of the dangers of his career, like gigantic groupers and poisonous box jellyfish. It also features the anaconda, taimen, lau lau and stonefish.
55	"Return of the Killer Catfish"	14 May 2017	TBA
Featured animals: Goonch catfish golden mahseer, gharial, giant snakehead Gharial crocodile On his first River Monsters investigation, Wade was propelled into a mountain river by a goonch catfish as big as himself. Ten years on, he fears such fish are now extinct until he hears a report from Nepal that sounds strangely familiar. A man was fishing with a net while no one was there. The man was never seen again. Wade suspects that the goonch could have been the perpetrator, but he feels that he must consider other suspects first. He travels to a village on the Karnali River near the incident, and he talks to some people who confirm the attack. Another man also tells Wade of one time that he was forced to let go of his net to avoid being dragged down the river, as he had already been dragged around a hundred yards. Wade goes to fish, but encounters several snags. He hears that these waters are often home to discarded fishing devices. He then moves to another stretch of the river, where he catches a mahseer, where he notes that these fish can grow to over ninety pounds. However, he hears of another attack where someone was deceived by a creature that he thought was dead. He showed Wade a scar that implied that his attacker was an animal with a narrow jaw, like an alligator gar. However, alligator gar do not live in Nepal. Wade continues fishing, and brings up a snakehead. He also states that snakehead can attack people, and they have a narrow jaw, but Wade does not feel like he has solved the case yet. However, when Wade is returning to his camp, he sees a partially submerged creature. He approaches carefully, and is able to identify it as a gharial. The gharial is an extremely rare crocodile, and Wade believes that it was the culprit of the latest attack he was told about. However, the water is too cold for crocodiles in the area where the first two attacks he heard about took place. Wade then eliminates all of the other candidates besides the goonch. He travels to the Babai River in Bardia National Park, where he is granted several days to fish for the goonch. He goes over some of his old journal entries, where he reads over his previous goonch adventures. He uses his old tactics to fish for the catfish. However, he uses up all of his allotted time, besides his last day, where he has two pools left to fish. When Wade sees evidence of a tiger recently in the area, he decides that it is too dangerous to fish in the pool. He moves to the final pool, where he waits on a rock. He eventually gets a bite, which seems very strong. Wade is quickly dragged into the water, where his guides struggle to retrieve him. They then try to salvage the situation with the rod, which still has a fish on the end. However, the fish eventually escapes from the hook mysteriously. Wade concludes by calling it a draw, saying that he earned one point in season 1, and the goonch earned one point in this episode. He says that he is partially satisfied to know that the goonch is not extinct.: Note: This is the second time Wade was not able to catch his intended River Monster, the first being the sareng from the "Asian Slayer" episode.
Special	"Fishing Secrets Revealed"	14 May 2017	TBA
Jeremy Wade recalls some experiences that left their mark on him, like a nearly deflated boat in Australia, and survival in an area of the Great Rift Valley that is infamously known as the 'Devil's Cauldron'.
Special	"Amazon Pack Attack"	21 May 2017	TBA
The Amazon is home to a terrifying pack hunter that can bring down prey far larger than itself.
56	"Volcanic Island Terror"	21 May 2017	TBA
Featured animals: golden snapper, Leopard coral grouper, barracuda, giant trevally, Papuan black bass, bull shark Giant trevally From the volcanic Pacific Island of New Britain, Papua New Guinea reports are surfacing of strange attacks. Jeremy Wade heads to New Britain, first stopping at a market island. Wade talks to some people on the island, and figures out where a man lives who had an extraordinary encounter. Wade finds the man, and he tells Wade about the encounter. Apparently the man was diving to spear fish, and ran into a school of small black fish. He speared one of the fish, and was about to resurface when he ran into a large, black, big-headed fish that he had not seen or recognised. He escaped from the large fish, whatever it was; however, the fact that he was unable to identify it surprised Wade. Wade notes that this man had been a fisherman for around thirty years, and knew the species very well. The fact that there was a fish species that was new to him was surprising. Also, it appears that this was the only time that this man ran into that species of fish. Wade then heads to another small island by boat, where another man was attacked. While travelling, he is running a lure behind his boat. First, a giant trevally bites. Wade dismisses the trevally, because it would be recognisable to any fisherman in the area. He then brings up a barracuda, which he dismisses too, because although dangerous, this fish would be highly recognisable, especially to experienced fishermen of the area. Wade then arrives at the island, where he finds a man with another encounter. This man was with a friend using a net. They had a big fish in the net. When they closed the net, the large fish attacked the man Wade is talking to, and left a mysterious puncture wound. Wade is very surprised to see that the fish only made one whole, instead of multiple. The man goes on to describe the fish as a large, black big-headed fish. This man is also unable to identify the species. Wade decides to fish where the encounter happened, on a shelf-like coral outcrop, where the chest-deep water plunges down to deeper water. A fish takes wades line, and threatens to pull Wade in several times. Wade nearly pulls the fish in, when the hook is somehow thrown. There is a strange, deep single tooth mark on Wade's bait, and Wade identifies the fish as a large, black big-headed fish, since he did get it within sight, however he is unable to tell what species it is. He wonders if this fish is a new arrival, when he hears another report of an attack that happened around sixty years ago. Wade meets a man who was a little boy (now in his seventies) who was playing with a friend, when he met an interesting fish. Apparently him and his friend were about to jump off a log, when they saw bubbles rising to the surface. At first, they thought it was a crocodile, but after looking closer, they were able to identify it as a large, black big-headed fish. Thinking it would be an easy meal, the boy called his older brother to spear the fish. The boy's brother speared the fish, but the fish survived and attacked him. The fish was dragging him into the water, when several Adults arrived and started trying to save him. After a "tug-of-war" the fish let go, and the boy's brother was able to get to shore. However, he was bleeding heavily, and the villagers had to make a makeshift tourniquet out of leaves. Luckily, he survived. Wade is intrigued by two facts about this encounter. The fish had the same description as the previous sightings, but this fish was encountered in fresh water. Wade then wonders if the culprit is anadromous, and came into the salt water from fresh water. Wade fishes in an estuary, and brings up a bull shark that is around five feet long. Although bull sharks can be dangerous, Wade has already dismissed sharks, because they leave a distinct crescent-like bite mark, and not a mysterious fang print. He then travels into the jungles, where he meets up with a researcher who has set up underwater cameras to monitor the fish species. The researcher shows Wade footage of a strange large, black big-headed fish, but he too is unable to identify it with a name that Wade recognises. However, Wade is able to Identify it as a Papuan black bass (Lutjanus goldiei). This fish can grow to forty-five pounds, and Wade is very eager to bring one up on his line. However, while he is fishing in a river junction, it starts to rain heavily. The next morning the river is swollen, and Wade decides to leave for brackish water because the river has risen, trees can be seen floating around, and since bass are sight hunters, a bass would be unlikely to bite any lures. Wade uses a lump of dead fish as bait once in the brackish water, and gets a strong take. Wade eventually brings in the fish, and identifies it as a Papuan black bass. Wade takes a look at the bass, and releases it, concluding that it was most likely the culprit. Wade also notes that there is growing evidence that Papuan black bass can swim into salt water, however this rarely occurs. As a result of this, even experienced fishermen can sometimes be unable to identify them.
Special	"Aquatic Aliens"	21 May 2017	TBA
The waters of the world are full of strange aquatic beasts. In this special episode, Wade discusses some of them.
Special	"Queensland Grouper"	25 May 2017	TBA
A special episode focused on large animals and deep sea sharks.
Special	"River Monster 'Unfinished Business'"	28 May 2017	TBA
The "Asian Slayer" episode on TV to re announce biologist and angling explorer, Jeremy Wade's attempt and failure to catch the sereng catfish, and lead up to the series finale, "Malaysian Lake Monster".
57	"Malaysian Lake Monster"	28 May 2017	TBA
Featured animals: Wallago leerii, arapaima, giant snakehead, pig, Asian water monitor Wallago (sareng) catfish Jeremy learns of the mysterious deaths of two men on Malaysia's remote Lake Kenyir. Just as suspicious as the deaths is the rumoured killer, the arapaima – which lives far across the world in South America and should not be present in Malaysia. However, with rumours of an unwanted pet arapaima released into the lake, Jeremy Wade cannot discount the possibility of his arch enemy having gone rogue far outside its habitat. As he researches the incidents, however, Jeremy hears from many people who have heard the arapaima rumours but none who have actually seen it. Another suspect connected to Jeremy's past is suggested – the "tapah," or Wallagonia leerii, the only river monster to defeat Jeremy when he searched for it in India and ran afoul of the significant mythology surrounding it. Wade also brings up a giant snakehead, but dismisses snakehead after noting that even the giant snakehead can only grow to around 40 pounds, and could not jump into a boat and drag its occupants out and into the water to their death. Wade also hears of poisonous gasses that can erupt from the lake, and wonders whether those were to blame for the disappearance. Wade then finds a man who photographed an arapaima, but this man dropped his phone into the lake later on. Wade then takes looks at a picture he has of an arapaima. However, despite the fact that the photo is genuine, the surroundings look totally different. Also, arapaima are usually dangerous when they are being netted, or when they are defending their nests. In order for arapaima to have nests, there has to be at least two breeding individuals, and Wade states that the chance of falling foul of an arapaima on Lake Kenyir is abysmal. Deducing that arapaima could not be responsible for the killings even if they were present in the lake, Jeremy travels to Borneo in search of a rematch with the tapah. Despite hearing of many more incidents surrounding this vicious fish, Jeremy is unable to catch it in the heavily fished waters of Borneo, prompting him to return to the Malaysian mainland and get in contact with an isolated tribe living in the jungle. Their information brings Jeremy new reports regarding just how aggressive the tapah is, and leads him to a spot deep in an ancient jungle where he hopes he will get another chance to battle the elusive fish. He quickly brings up a snakehead. However, despite a quick success, other fish do not bite for the whole rest of the day. He then fishes using two lines with alarms on the opposite banks of the river, but this fails to attract a fish. His guide's bait did get attacked by what Jeremy assumes is a tapah, but he is somewhat discouraged by the fact that the fish did not get hooked, and it is most likely too weary to take another bait. the slow fishing activity and a sudden monsoon that arrives while Jeremy is searching for another fishing spot bring him memories of his failed expedition in India, making him worry that the curse he was warned of has returned to haunt him once again. As time runs out and the river threatens to swell and become unfishable thanks to a storm, Jeremy finally hooks and catches the tapah, bringing closure to his pursuit of the one river monster to ever best him. Despite its confirmed aggressive behaviour, Jeremy displays the tapah's dangerous teeth, and concludes that because the bodies recovered from the lake lacked any physical damage, the tapah was not the killer, and the most likely explanation is the poisonous gasses. Note: Jeremy Wade mentions that the Tapah is known as the sareng in India. However, the smaller cousin of the Tapah Wallago attu is the fish known as the sareng in India as seen in the Season Four episode "Asian Slayer".
Special	"Final Cast: Arctic Assailant"	29 May 2017	TBA
Jeremy Wade hears of an elusive sea monster that washed up on Northumberland's beaches, in the UK Wade follows the trail to Greenland, and then on to Norway searching for this elusive predator.
Special	"Final Cast: The Goonch"	29 May 2017	TBA
A special episode retelling Jeremy Wade's season 9 encounter with the goonch catfish in the episode, "Return of the Killer Catfish".
Special	"Final Cast: Beast of Volcano Island"	29 May 2017	TBA
On the volcanic island of Papua New Guinea, a mysterious creature is attacking people, and leaving only one clue to its identity: some mysterious puncture wounds on victims.
Special	"Final Cast: Reef Ripper"	29 May 2017	TBA
A coral reef is home to a terrifying creature.
Special	"South American Stinger"	11 June 2017	TBA
The Rio Parana in Argentina is home to a giant, powerful stingray.
Special	"Argentinean Attacker"	11 June 2017	TBA
Extreme angler Jeremy Wade returns to the remote Parana river in Argentina, this time in search of a toothy predator that is leaving behind a river of blood.
Special	"African Abductor"	19 June 2017	TBA
A dangerous African river monster is leaving behind a trail of terror.
Special	"Goliath of the Congo"	19 June 2017	TBA
A river monster unlike any other is patrolling the Congo river of Africa
Special	"Bolivian Nightmare"	26 June 2017	TBA
A man has had his whole face ripped off in a remote Bolivian river. Jeremy Wade attempts to hunt down the culprit.
Special	"Peruvian Maneater"	26 June 2017	TBA
In Peru, a terrifying sea monster has been leaving behind unidentifiable wounds on its numerous victims.
Special	"Mekong Monster"	2 July 2017	TBA
From the Mekong River, reports are surfacing of an enormous beast armed with a sword like barb on its tail. Wade heads to Thailand to find the source of these stories, and ends up battling a 700 pound monster, and snapping a tendon in the process of a colossal fight with the beast once it is hooked.
Special	"Cambodian Terror"	2 July 2017	TBA
In Cambodia, sinister wounds are turning up on the unfortunate victims of some mysterious river monster.

== Season 10 (2017) ==
This season only had one episode, "Jeremy's Monster Story".

No.	Title	Original release date
Special	"Jeremy's Monster Story"	29 May 2017
Jeremy Wade This episode tells the story of Jeremy Wade's journey. First uncovering some of the features of the episode, "Killer Catfish".

== Additional episodes: The Lost Reels ==
No.	Title	Original release date
1	"The Lost Reels: Amazonian Giant"	27 May 2011
Featured animals: arapaima, river stingray, black piranha, redtail catfish Jeremy Wade ventures to the Amazon to face the legendary arapaima, but gets more than he bargained for when his plane crashes and he feels the full force of these powerful animals.
2	"The Lost Reels: Himalayan Giant"	27 May 2011
Featured animals: goonch, golden mahseer, dwarf snakehead, carp, Indian flapshell turtle, mully catfish, flathead catfish After reading about monster fish in India, Jeremy Wade travels to the Himalayas to catch a monster himself. After hearing stories at the local fish markets, he encounters predators, giants and one chilling story about a monster fish that has an appetite for human flesh.
