= Piranha (disambiguation) =

A piranha, or piraña, is a carnivorous freshwater fish.

Piranha may also refer to:

== Film and television ==
- Piranha (film series), a horror comedy franchise
  - Piranha (1978 film), 1978 horror film
  - Piranha II: The Spawning, 1981 sequel to the 1978 film
  - Piranha (1995 film), 1995 remake of the 1978 film
  - Piranha 3D, 2010 remake of the 1978 film
  - Piranha 3DD, 2012 sequel to the 2010 film
- Piranha (1972 film), horror film unrelated to the film series
- Piranha (2006 film), Russian film
- Piranhas (2019 film), a 2019 Italian film
- "Piranha" (River Monsters), a 2009 television documentary episode

== Music ==
- The Piranhas, a British ska-influenced punk band
- Piranha (band), an American thrash metal band
- Piranha (album), 2000 album by the Fullerton College Jazz Band
- "Piranha" (song), by The Grace from their album Graceful 4
- "Piranha", song by The Prodigy from the album Invaders Must Die
- "PirANhA", song by rock band Tripping Daisy from the album I Am an Elastic Firecracker
- "Piranha", song by metal band Exodus from the album Bonded by Blood
- "Piranha", song by singer-songwriter Lights from the album A6

== Publications ==
- The Piranha, Trinity College, Dublin's student satirical newspaper
- Piranha Press, imprint of DC comics (1989 to 1993)
- Piranha Brothers, a Monty Python sketch
- Piranha Club, powerful and eponymous fraternity in the comic strip Ernie/Piranha Club

== Software and video games ==
- Piranha (software), a data mining system
- Piranha Bytes, a German game developer
- Piranha Interactive Publishing, an American software publisher
- Piranha Games, a Canadian software developer
- Piranha Software, a defunct software label of Macmillan Publishing
- Piranha Plant, a fictional plant species
- Petey Piranha, a character in Nintendo's Mario game series

== Military ==
- ALR Piranha, an aircraft project undertaken by the Swiss Air Force
- MAA-1 Piranha, a Brazilian air-to-air missile
- Mowag Piranha, a type of armoured fighting vehicle
- USS Piranha (SS-389), a Balao-class submarine
- Pirana USV, Turkish "kamikaze"-type unmanned surface vehicle

== Other uses ==
- Piranhas (baseball), a nickname for some of the hitters on the Minnesota Twins baseball team
- Pirana, Rajasthan, a village in India
- Bertone Pirana, a show car based on the Jaguar E-Type
- Piranha solution, a cleaning solution
- Piraña (Efteling), a river rapids ride in amusement park Efteling
- Piranha (comics), a fictional character appearing in Marvel Comics
- Piranhas, Alagoas, Brazil
- Piranhas, Goiás, Brazil

== See also ==
- Paraná (disambiguation)
- Piraha (disambiguation)
- Piranhas River (disambiguation)
