= Parana =

Paraná, Paranã or Parana may refer to:

== Geology ==
- Paraná Basin, a sedimentary basin in South America

== Places ==
=== In Argentina ===
- Paraná, Entre Ríos, a city
- Paraná Department, a part of Entre Ríos Province

=== In Brazil ===
- Paraná (state), a state in the South of Brazil
- Paraná, Rio Grande do Norte, a town
- Paraná Province, one of the provinces of the Empire of Brazil
- Paranã, a city in the state of Tocantins
- Ji-Paraná, a city in the state of Rondônia

== Rivers ==
- Paraná River, a river that flows through Brazil, Paraguay, and Argentina
  - Paraná Delta, at the mouth of Paraná River
- Paranã River, a river in the state of Goiás, Brazil
- Paraná Urariá, a river in the state of Amazonas, Brazil

== Other ==
- ARA Paraná, several ships of the Argentine Navy
- Ji-Paraná Futebol Clube, a football team from Ji-Paraná, Rondônia state
- Paraná Clube, a football team in the Vila Capanema district of Curitiba, Paraná
- Paraná (footballer), Brazilian association footballer
- Parana pine, a common name of Araucaria angustifolia

== See also ==
- Paran (disambiguation), places in Israel and Iran
- Piranha, or pirañas, omnivorous freshwater fish living in South American rivers
- Piranha (disambiguation)
