= Wolf fish =

Wolf fish, wolf-fish, or wolffish may refer to:

- Anarhichadidae, a family of marine fishes
- Erythrinidae, a family of freshwater fishes
  - Hoplias aimara, a species in the family Erythrinidae
  - Hoplias malabaricus, a species in the family Erythrinidae
