= Hemibagrus wyckii =

Crystal-eyed catfish

Conservation status
- Least Concern (IUCN 3.1)

Scientific classification
- Kingdom: Animalia
- Phylum: Chordata
- Class: Actinopterygii
- Division: Teleostei
- Order: Siluriformes
- Family: Bagridae
- Genus: Hemibagrus
- Species: H. wyckii

Binomial name
- Hemibagrus wyckii (Bleeker, 1858)

Synonyms
- Bagrus wyckii Bleeker 1858; Macrones wyckii (Bleeker, 1858); Mystus wyckii (Bleeker, 1858)

Species of fish

Hemibagrus wyckii is a species of catfish (order Siluriformes) of the family Bagridae. It is occasionally called the crystal-eyed catfish, blacktail catfish or black devil catfish.

== Distribution ==
This species originates in Asia from Thailand to Indonesia. It is known from the Mekong and Chao Phraya drainages in central Indochina. It is also known from the Batang Hari and Musi River drainages in Sumatra, the Pahang River and Perak River drainage in Peninsular Malaysia, the Citarum drainage in Java, and the Baram, Rejang, Kapuas, and Barito River drainages in Borneo.

== Appearance and anatomy ==
Hemibagrus wyckii are black with a few white markings on the caudal and dorsal fins, and the eyes are sky blue. They reach about 71 centimetres (28 in) SL. The head is extremely depressed and broad. The caudal fin is dark grey. The dorsal fin spine has 10–12 serrations on the posterior edge.

Hemibagrus wyckii bears a resemblance to H. wyckioides, however H. wyckioides lacks serrations on the dorsal fin spine, has a shorter dorsal fin base, and shorter maxillary barbels.

== Ecology ==
Hemibagrus wyckii appears to be restricted in the middle reaches of the large rivers it inhabits. This species feeds on insects, prawns and fishes. These fish are aggressive and can attack animals of their own size; they have been claimed to be the "only freshwater fish unafraid of man".

== Relationship to humans ==
This fish is marketed fresh as a food fish. Hemibagrus are aquacultured in Asian countries.

Hemibagrus wyckii and Hemibagrus wyckioides are the two members of this genus imported as aquarium fish. These fish will bite and can damage objects in the aquarium. Due to both its aggressive and its predatory nature, this species should be kept alone.
