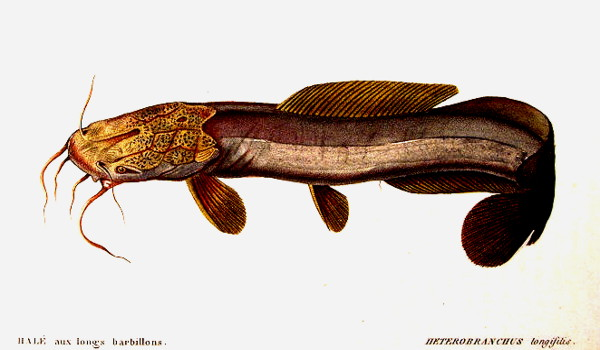

Conservation status
- Least Concern (IUCN 3.1)

Scientific classification
- Kingdom: Animalia
- Phylum: Chordata
- Class: Actinopterygii
- Order: Siluriformes
- Family: Clariidae
- Genus: Heterobranchus
- Species: H. longifilis

Binomial name
- Heterobranchus longifilis Valenciennes, 1840

= Vundu =

Vundu Temporal range: Lower Pliocene - Present

Species of fish

The vundu (Heterobranchus longifilis) is a species of large airbreathing catfish found widely in rivers and other freshwater habitats of sub-Saharan Africa, as well as the Nile. It is also called the sampa, cur, lenda, or certa.

== Description ==
The vundu is the largest true freshwater fish in southern Africa, reaching up to 1.5 m (5 ft) in length and 55 kg (121 lb) in weight. (Bull sharks are also found in southern Africa and reach a larger size, but occur in both fresh and saltwater.) Few other catfish have such large second dorsal fins (adipose fins) or such long barbels as do the vundu. Its barbels nearly reach to the origin of the pelvic fin. The colour of Heterobranchus longifilis is light to dark olive brown on its dorsal surface, getting lighter over the mid-body to a light brown. Its belly is off-white. Fins are usually light brown.

In aquaculture, it is sometimes hybridized with another very large species, the African sharptooth catfish (Clarias gariepinus), resulting in offspring known as "Hetero-clarias".

== Habitat and range ==
The vundu is found widely in rivers and other freshwater habitats of sub-Saharan Africa, only extending beyond this region in the Nile (although it is rare in the lower sections of this river). Among others, it is found in the Benue River, Volta River, Niger River, Gambia River, Senegal River, Lake Chad, Omo River, Congo River Basin, Lake Rukwa, Lake Kariba, Zambezi River, Lake Tanganyika and Lake Edward.

The vundu is generally uncommon, but it is not considered threatened despite having declined locally. Most active at night, it feeds on any available food, including invertebrates and insects when small, then fish and other small vertebrates when large. It scavenges off large carcasses and offal from riverside villages. It can live for 12 or more years. The vundu can survive out of water for extensive periods of time.

Due to impaired vision, they rely on vibrations and smells in search of food. They love to remain in deep water for eating any available food they need.

The vundu eating habits affect many aspects of their lives; their growth, feeding efficiency, and body mineral composition. If they are raised in captivity and fed a soy based or cotton based meal their growth will reduce significantly. Changing the vundu's diets partially is okay, but changing them completely is detrimental to an extent because of the lack of protein they receive in a given meal.
