= Pirahã =

Pirahã or Pirahán may refer to:

- Pirahã people, of Brazil
- Pirahã language, their dialect of Mura
