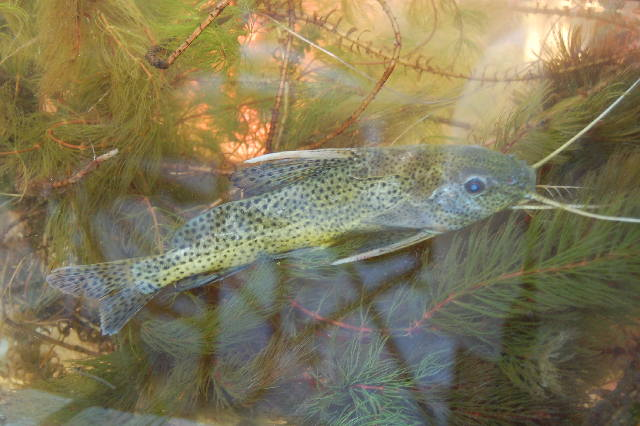

Conservation status
- Least Concern (IUCN 3.1)

Scientific classification
- Kingdom: Animalia
- Phylum: Chordata
- Class: Actinopterygii
- Order: Siluriformes
- Family: Mochokidae
- Genus: Synodontis
- Species: S. nigromaculatus

Binomial name
- Synodontis nigromaculatus Boulenger, 1905

= Synodontis nigromaculatus =

Species of fish

Synodontis nigromaculatus, known as the spotted squeaker, the blackspotted squeaker, or the speckled squeaker, is a species of upside-down catfish that is found widely in southern Africa. It has been identified in Angola, Botswana, the Democratic Republic of the Congo, Mozambique, Namibia, South Africa, Zambia, and Zimbabwe. It was first described by British-Belgian zoologist George Albert Boulenger in 1905, from specimens collected in Lake Bangweulu in Zambia.

== Description ==
Like all members of the genus Synodontis, S. nigromaculatus has a strong, bony head capsule that extends back as far as the first spine of the dorsal fin. The head contains a distinct narrow, bony, external protrusion called a humeral process. The shape and size of the humeral process helps to identify the species. In S. nigromaculatus, the humeral process is long, without a distinct keel, and ends in a sharp point.

The fish has three pairs of barbels. The maxillary barbels are on located on the upper jaw, and two pairs of mandibular barbels are on the lower jaw. The maxillary barbel is long and straight without any branches, with a narrow membrane at the base. It extends 1 1/3 times the length of the head. The outer pair of mandibular barbels is about twice the length of the inner pair, and both pairs have long, slender branches.

The front edges of the dorsal fins and the pectoral fins of Syntontis species are hardened into stiff spines. In S. nigromaculatus, the spine of the dorsal fin is straight and long, about as long as the head, smooth in the front and serrated on the back. The remaining portion of the dorsal fin is made up of seven branching rays. The spine of the pectoral fin is about the same length as the dorsal spine, and serrated on both sides. The adipose fin is 4 times as long as it is deep. The anal fin contains four unbranched and seven branched rays. The tail, or caudal fin, is deeply forked, with the upper lobe being longer.

All members of Syndontis have a structure called a premaxillary toothpad, which is located on the very front of the upper jaw of the mouth. This structure contains several rows of short, chisel-shaped teeth. In S. nigromaculatus, the toothpad forms a short and broad band. On the lower jaw, or mandible, the teeth of Syndontis are attached to flexible, stalk-like structures and described as "s-shaped" or "hooked". The number of teeth on the mandible is used to differentiate between species; in S. nigromaculatus, there are about 30 teeth on the mandible.

The body color is greyish on the top, white on the underside. The body is covered with round black spots.

The maximum total length of the species is 38.5 centimetres (15.2 in). The maximum published weight is 315 grams (11.1 oz). Generally, females in the genus Synodontis tend to be slightly larger than males of the same age.

== Habitat and behavior ==
In the wild, the species has been found throughout southern Africa. In central Africa, it occurs in the southern tributaries of the Congo River basin. In eastern Africa, it is present in Lake Tanganyika. In southern Africa, it is found in the upper Zambezi River and Okavango River systems, as well as the Kasai River and the Limpopo River systems. It is found in rocks or vegetation occurring at the edge of rivers to lagoons or backwaters. The reproductive habits of most of the species of Synodontis are not known, beyond some instances of obtaining egg counts from gravid females. Spawning likely occurs during the flooding season between July and October, and pairs swim in unison during spawning. The fish feeds on detritus, algae and plant matter such as seeds, small fish, and small invertebrates like insects and snails. The growth rate is rapid in the first year, then slows down as the fish age.
