= Pirana, Rajasthan =

Coordinates: 30°24′N 78°15′E

Pirana
- Village
- Interactive map of Pirana
- Country: India
- State: Rajasthan

Population
  - Total: 2,021
  - Density: 173.92/km^{2} (450.5/sq mi)

Languages
  - Official: Hindi
- Time zone: UTC+5:30 (IST)

Pirana is a small village located in the state of Rajasthan in India. According to data from 2009, the population of the village is 2021, and there are 468 households.

The population density of the village is 173.92 people per square kilometer.
