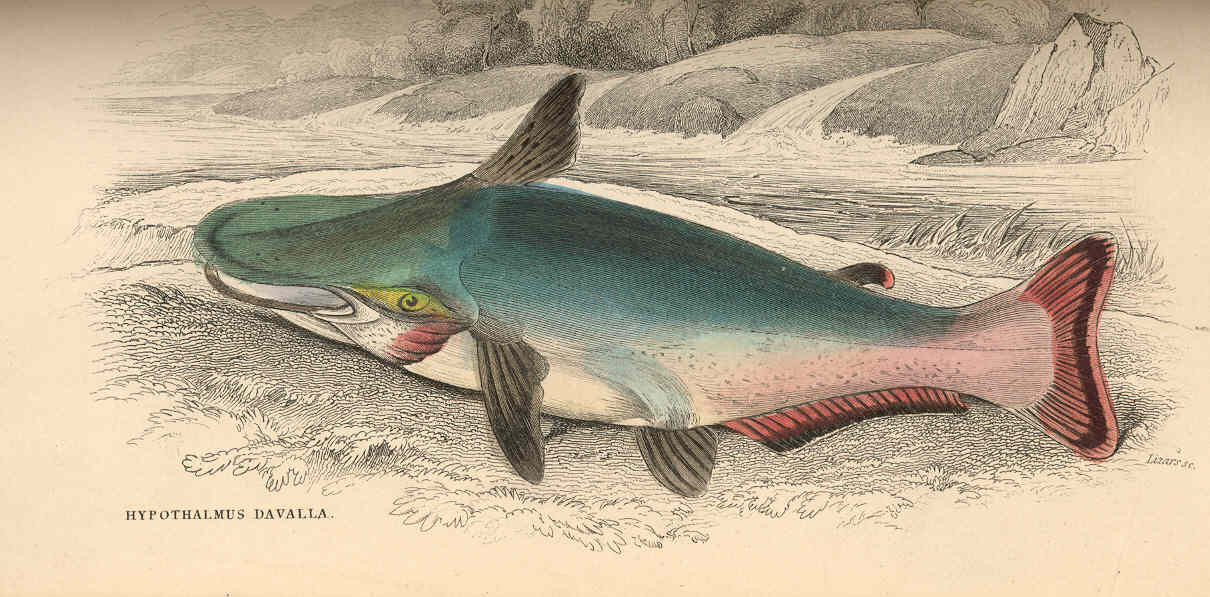

Conservation status
- Least Concern (IUCN 3.1)

Scientific classification
- Kingdom: Animalia
- Phylum: Chordata
- Class: Actinopterygii
- Division: Teleostei
- Order: Siluriformes
- Family: Auchenipteridae
- Genus: Ageneiosus
- Species: A. inermis

Binomial name
- Ageneiosus inermis (Linnaeus, 1766)

Synonyms
- Silurus inermis Linnaeus, 1766; Ageneiosus armatus Lacepède, 1803; Ageniosus brevifilis Valenciennes, 1840; Hypothalmus dawalla Jardine, 1841; Ageneiosus dawalla (Jardine, 1841); Davalla schomburgkii Bleeker, 1858; Ageniosus axillaris Günther, 1864; Ageneiosus axillaris Günther, 1864; Ageneiosus sebae Günther, 1864; Ageneiosus therezine Steindachner, 1909; Ageneiosus ogilviei Fowler, 1914; Ageneiosus gabardinii Risso & Risso, 1964

= Ageneiosus inermis =

Mandubé

Species of fish

Ageneiosus inermis, also known as Fidalgo, Dawala or Mandubé, is a species of driftwood catfish of the family Auchenipteridae. It can be found throughout South America, from Colombia and Venezuela to Uruguay and northern Argentina.

The name Ageneiosus marmoratus has been recently synonymized with A. inermis. The description was based on a strongly pigmented juvenile of A. inermis. The species feeds on a piscivorous diet, mainly hunting catfishes in the family Loricariidae and Doradidae.
