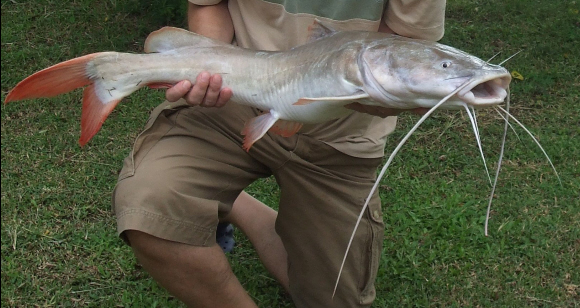

Conservation status
- Least Concern (IUCN 3.1)

Scientific classification
- Kingdom: Animalia
- Phylum: Chordata
- Class: Actinopterygii
- Division: Teleostei
- Order: Siluriformes
- Family: Bagridae
- Genus: Hemibagrus
- Species: H. wyckioides

Binomial name
- Hemibagrus wyckioides (P. W. Fang & Chaux, 1949)

Synonyms
- Macrones wyckioides Fang & Chaux, 1949; Mystus wyckioides (Fang & Chaux, 1949); Mystus aubentoni Desoutter, 1975

= Hemibagrus wyckioides =

Asian redtail catfish

Species of fish

Hemibagrus wyckioides, the Asian redtail catfish, is a species of catfish (order Siluriformes) of the family Bagridae.

== Distribution ==
These catfish originate from the Mekong basin, and are reported from Chao Phraya, Mae Klong, and peninsular Thailand river systems. There is also an introduced population in Malaysia.

== Appearance and anatomy ==
Hemibagrus wyckioides reaches a length of 130 centimetres (51 inches) TL. This species is the largest Bagrid catfish in Asia, and may reach 80 kilograms (180 lb). The caudal fin is white when the fish is small, but it becomes bright red when it reaches about 15 cm (6 in).

Hemibagrus wyckii bears a resemblance to H. wyckioides, however, H. wyckioides lacks serrations on the dorsal fin spine, has a shorter dorsal fin base, and shorter maxillary barbels.

== Ecology ==
Hemibagrus wyckioides occurs in large upland rivers, and is common in areas with rocky bottoms and irregular depths. These fish do not migrate, but they reproduce locally and enter the flooded forest during high water in July–October. H. wyckiodies feed on insects, prawns, fish, and crabs.

== Relationship to humans ==
This fish is marketed fresh as a food fish. Hemibagrus are aquacultured in Asian countries.

Hemibagrus wyckioides and Hemibagrus wyckii are the two members of this genus imported as aquarium fish. This species will rearrange decorations in the aquarium. These fish are not picky, and will eat a variety of fish foods. This species is sometimes claimed to be the most aggressive freshwater fish in the world, and should be left alone.

== As an invasive species ==
H. wyckioides is an invasive species in Malaysia. They were introduced as a food fish and some individuals escaped from fish farms or were released illegally into rivers. It is now illegal to keep H. wyckioides in net cages in Malaysia.
