= ARA Paraná =

At least two ships of the Argentine Navy have been named Paraná:

- ARA Paraná (1873), a steam corvette which served as a gunboat commissioned in 1874. She was renamed Piedrabuena in 1900 and re-rated as a transport. She was wrecked in 1926.
- ARA Paraná (1908), a Rosario-class gunboat launched in 1908 and decommissioned in 1951.
