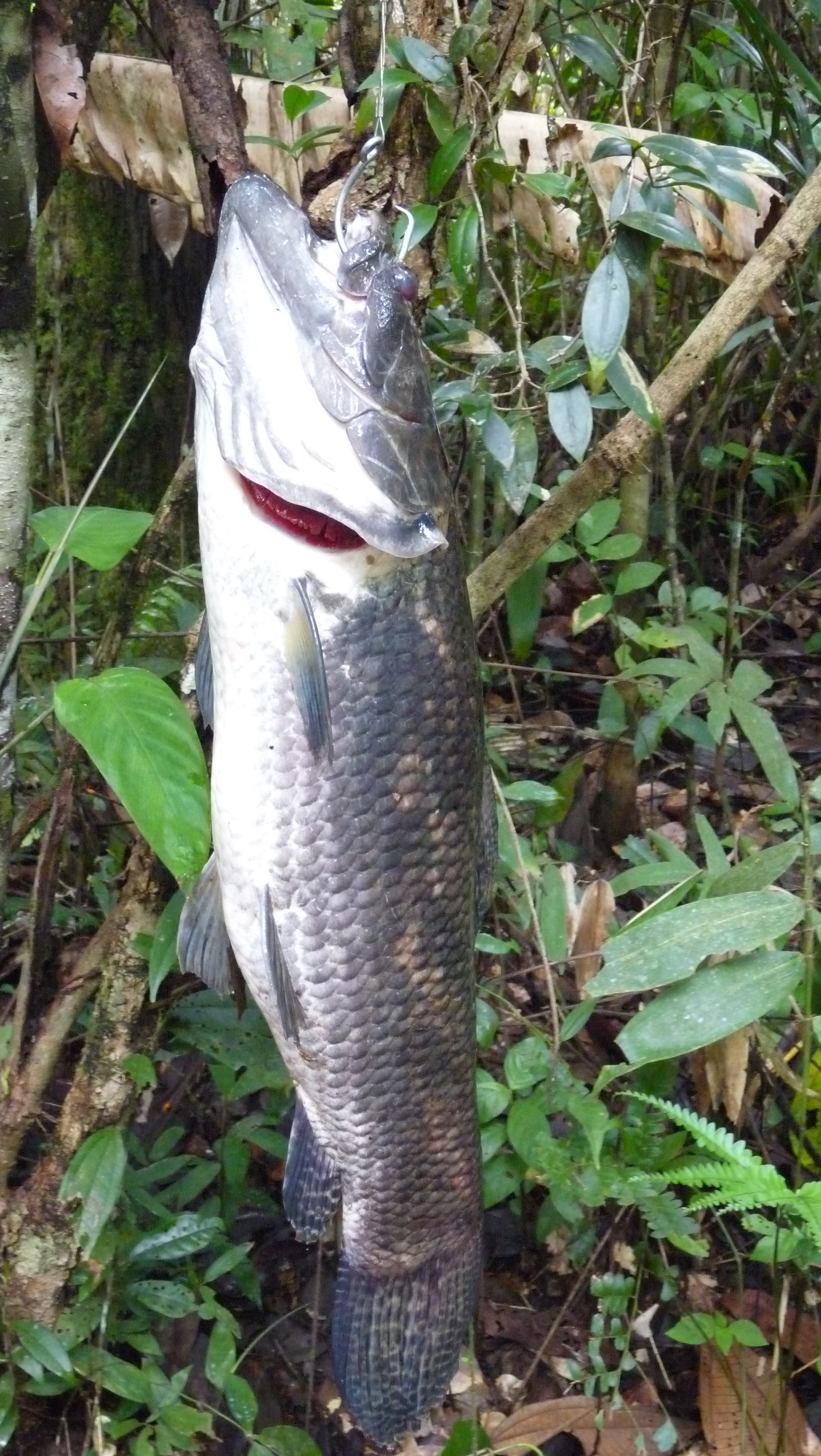

Conservation status
- Least Concern (IUCN 3.1)

Scientific classification
- Kingdom: Animalia
- Phylum: Chordata
- Class: Actinopterygii
- Order: Characiformes
- Family: Erythrinidae
- Genus: Hoplias
- Species: H. aimara

Binomial name
- Hoplias aimara (Valenciennes, 1847)

Synonyms
- Macrodon aimara Valenciennes, 1847; Macrodon malabaricus var. macrophthalma Pellegrin, 1907; Hoplias macrophthalmus (Pellegrin 1907)

= Hoplias aimara =

Species of fish

Hoplias aimara, also known as anjumara, traíra, trahira, manjuma, anjoemara and giant wolf fish, is a species of freshwater fish found in the rivers of South America. In Amazonia, the native populations are concerned by high levels of mercury contamination which have been linked to the consumption of contaminated fish. H. aimara is a good bioindicator of such contamination.

== Description ==
This is the largest of the Hoplias species with specimens caught at a length of 120 cm (47 in), the largest rod and reel record stands at 101 cm (40 in). They can weigh as much as 40 kg (88 lb). This species has an elongated cylindrical shape. the colour is basically brown with a lighter base colour, although shades can vary, with a number of vertical patches or stripes. There are normally small spots visible on the upper anterior part of the body including the head, the patterning can vary geographically. The colour can be almost solid black through to pale brownish gold colour with marked dark stripes. Although it seems docile, the fish has been known to attack divers and swimmers, however there is rarely a fatal ending.

== Taxonomy ==
There were thought to be two species of giant trahiras Hoplias aimara (Valenciennes, 1846) and Hoplias macrophthalmus (Pellegrin, 1907), each described from French Guiana, study of the type-specimens of each species showed that both names, H. aimara and H. macrophthalmus, referred to the same taxon. The Principle of Priority of the International Code of Zoological Nomenclature therefore means that the name Hoplias aimara has precedence.

== Distribution, habitat and ecology ==
Across most of northern South America, Brazil, Colombia, Venezuela, Guyana, French Guiana, Suriname and the island of Trinidad. Often found in counter current zones of principal rivers and creeks. It is mainly an ambush predator of fish but also feeds opportunistically on other animals that fall into the water such as terrestrial invertebrates. Attacks on larger vertebrates including humans are unproven. It is active predominantly at dusk and at night. Reproduction takes place at the onset of the rainy season from December to March. Depending on the size, the female can carry around 6,000 to 60,000 eggs. It is known for the quality of its flesh and populations in many more settled parts of its range have been severely depleted due to fishing for food.

== Gallery ==
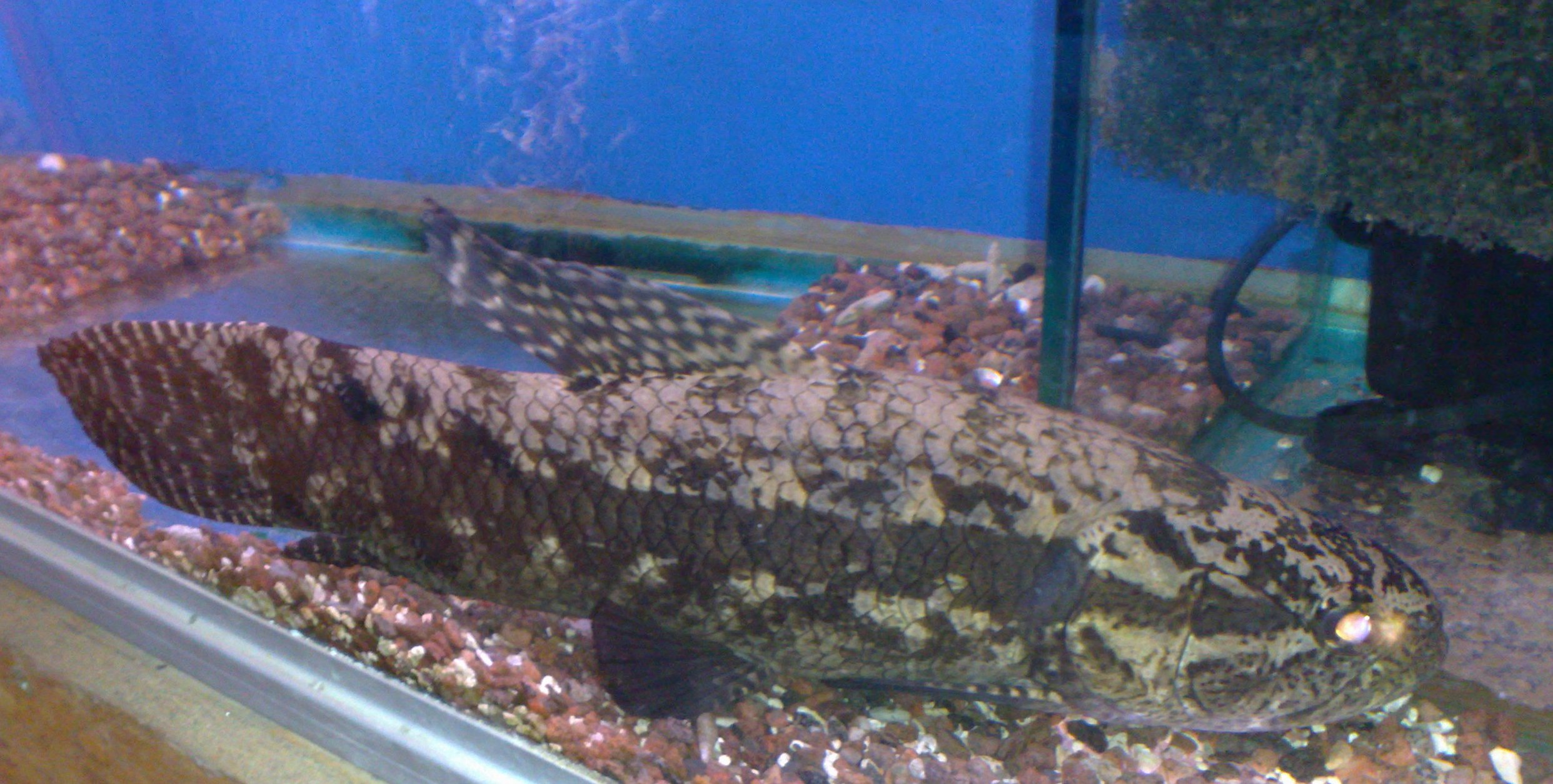

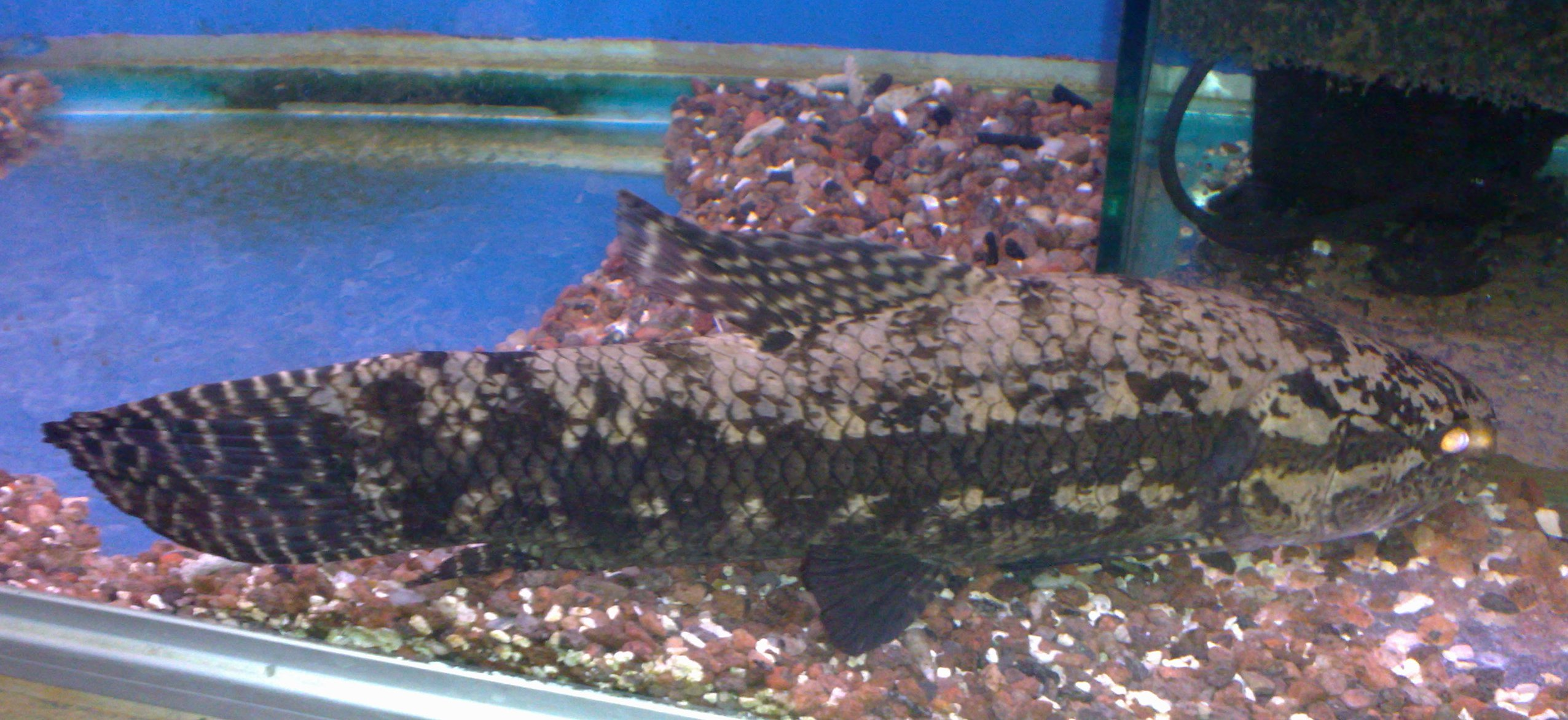
