= List of freshwater game fish =

This is a list of freshwater fish pursued by recreational anglers.

- African pike
- African sharptooth catfish
- Alligator gar
- American paddlefish
- Amur catfish
- Amur pike
- Anjumara
- Arapaima
- Arctic grayling
- Asian arowana
- Asian redtail catfish
- Asp
- Atlantic salmon
- Atlantic sturgeon
- Australian bass
- Australian grayling
- Barramundi
- Barred catfish
- Barred sorubim
- Basa
- Bayad
- Beluga (sturgeon)
- Biara
- Bicuda
- Black arowana
- Black bullhead
- Black carp
- Black crappie
- Blue catfish
- Blue tigerfish
- Bluegill
- Boal
- Bowfin
- Brook trout
- Brown bullhead
- Brown trout
- Bull trout
- Bullseye snakehead
- Burbot
- Butterfly peacock bass
- Chain pickerel
- Channel catfish
- Chinese sturgeon
- Chinook salmon
- Chum salmon
- Clanwilliam yellowfish
- Clown featherback
- Coastal cutthroat trout
- Coho salmon
- Colorado pikeminnow
- Common barbel
- Common bream
- Common chub
- Common snakehead
- Cutthroat trout
- Dolly Varden trout
- Eastern freshwater cod
- Eel-tailed catfish
- European perch
- Firewood catfish
- Flathead catfish
- Flatwhiskered catfish
- Florida gar
- Giant barb
- Giant kōkopu
- Giant pangasius
- Giant river-catfish
- Giant snakehead
- Gilded catfish
- Golden dorado
- Golden mahseer
- Golden mandarin fish
- Golden perch
- Goldeye
- Goliath tigerfish
- Goonch catfish
- Green sturgeon
- Green sunfish
- Guabine
- Gulf saratoga
- Harm
- Huchen
- Humpback mahseer
- Hybrid striped bass
- Hydrolycus tatauaia
- Ide (fish)
- Iridescent shark
- Japanese sturgeon
- Kaluga (fish)
- Kampango
- Lake sturgeon
- Largemouth bass
- Largemouth yellowfish
- Longnose gar
- Macquarie perch
- Mandarin fish
- Marble trout
- Masu salmon
- Mayan cichlid
- Mekong giant catfish
- Moggel
- Mongolian redfin
- Mooneye
- Murray cod
- Muskellunge
- Nelma
- Nile perch
- Northern pike
- Northern pikeminnow
- Northern snakehead
- Orinoco peacock bass
- Pangas catfish
- Papermouth
- Payara
- Phalacronotus apogon
- Pink salmon
- Porthole shovelnose catfish
- Predatory carp
- Pumpkinseed
- Rainbow trout
- Red-bellied piranha
- Redbreast sunfish
- Redear sunfish
- Redeye piranha
- Redhook myleus
- Redtail catfish
- Reeya's shrimp
- Ripsaw catfish
- Rita
- River blackfish
- Rock bass
- Royal peacock bass
- Russian sturgeon
- Sacramento pikeminnow
- Sakhalin taimen
- Sauger
- Sharp-snouted lenok
- Siberian sturgeon
- Siberian taimen
- Silond catfish
- Silver arowana
- Sleepy cod
- Smallmouth bass
- Smallmouth buffalo
- Smallmouth yellowfish
- Sockeye salmon
- Softmouth trout
- Soldatov's catfish
- Speckled peacock bass
- Spotted bass
- Spotted galaxias
- Sterlet
- Striped bass
- Tambaqui
- Tench
- Texas cichlid
- Tiervis
- Tiger muskellunge
- Tiger sorubim
- Tor mahseer
- Toukounaré
- Trout cod
- Vundu
- Walleye
- Warmouth
- Wels catfish
- Whitespotted char
- White bass
- White bream
- White crappie
- White perch
- White sturgeon
- Wolf cichlid
- Yellow bass
- Yellow bullhead
- Yellow perch
- Yellowcheek
- Zander

== See also ==
- Game fish
- List of marine game fish
