= Cinaruco River =

Coordinates: 6.7728°N 67.0517°W

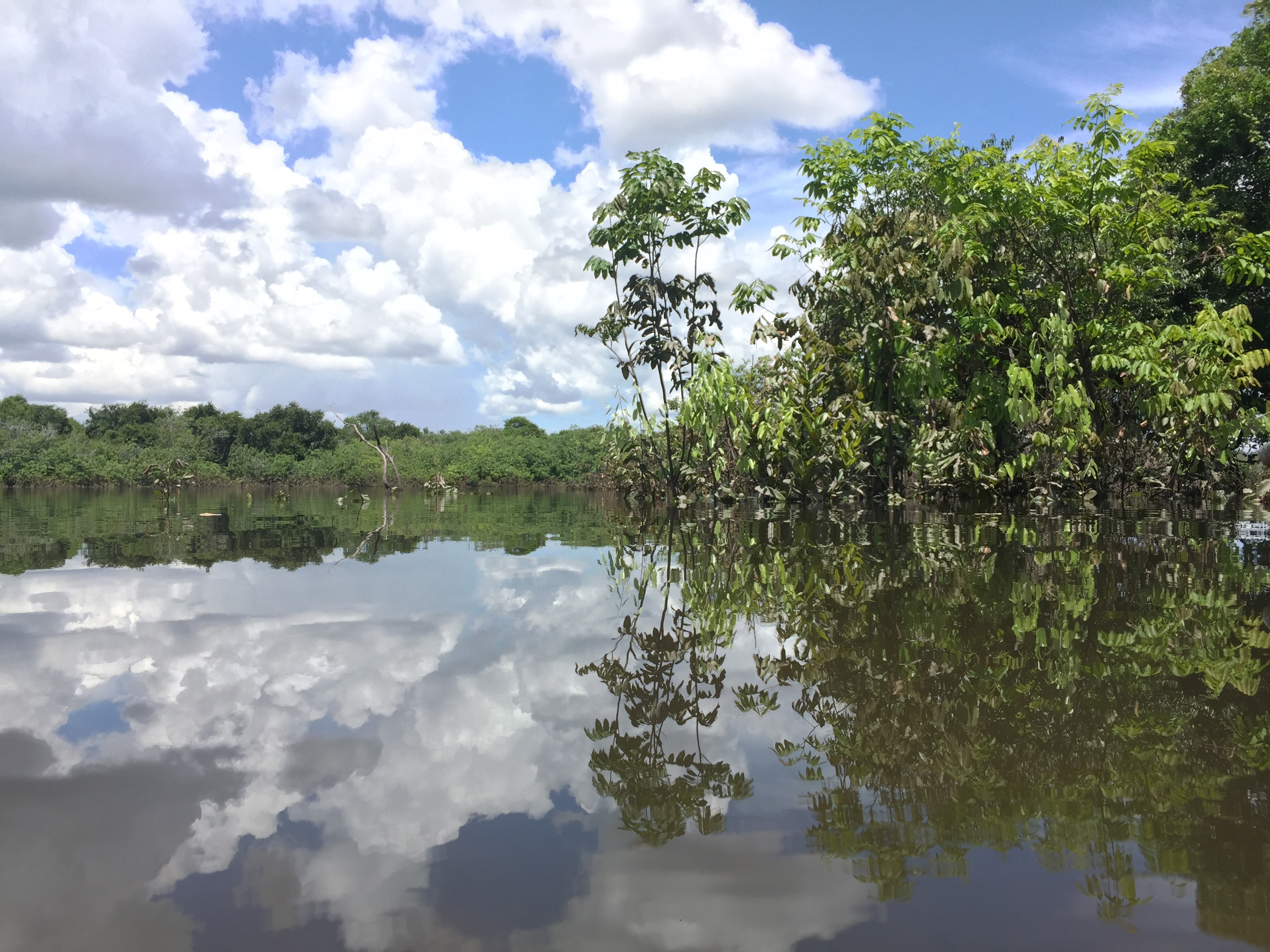
- Cinaruco River in the beginning of the dry season

Location
- Countries: Colombia; Venezuela

The Cinaruco River is a tributary that originates in Colombia, specifically in the department of Arauca, and flows into Venezuelan territory, where it eventually empties into the Orinoco River. This river is part of the first continental protected area in Colombia designated under the category of National Integrated Management District, whose purpose is to conserve natural ecosystems while allowing the sustainable use of resources by the Llanero and Indigenous communities that inhabit the region.

The area surrounding the Cinaruco River is mainly characterized by the presence of extensive tropical floodplain savannas or poorly drained savannas, along with a variety of ecosystems such as wetlands, lagoons, beaches, sandbanks or dunes, gallery forests, and multiple bodies of water associated with the Cinaruco and Capanaparo river basins. It is part of the Orinoco River basin. It has partially clear tanic waters. In Venezuela this river is part of the Santos Luzardo National Park since the year 1988. The Cinaruco River together with the Capanaparo River, other smaller rivers and the area around them form this national park. It houses a big biodiversity and many fishermen go each year looking for peacock bass. Three different species of peacock bass are found in this river: Cichla intermedia, Cichla orinocensis and Cichla temensis from smallest to biggest.

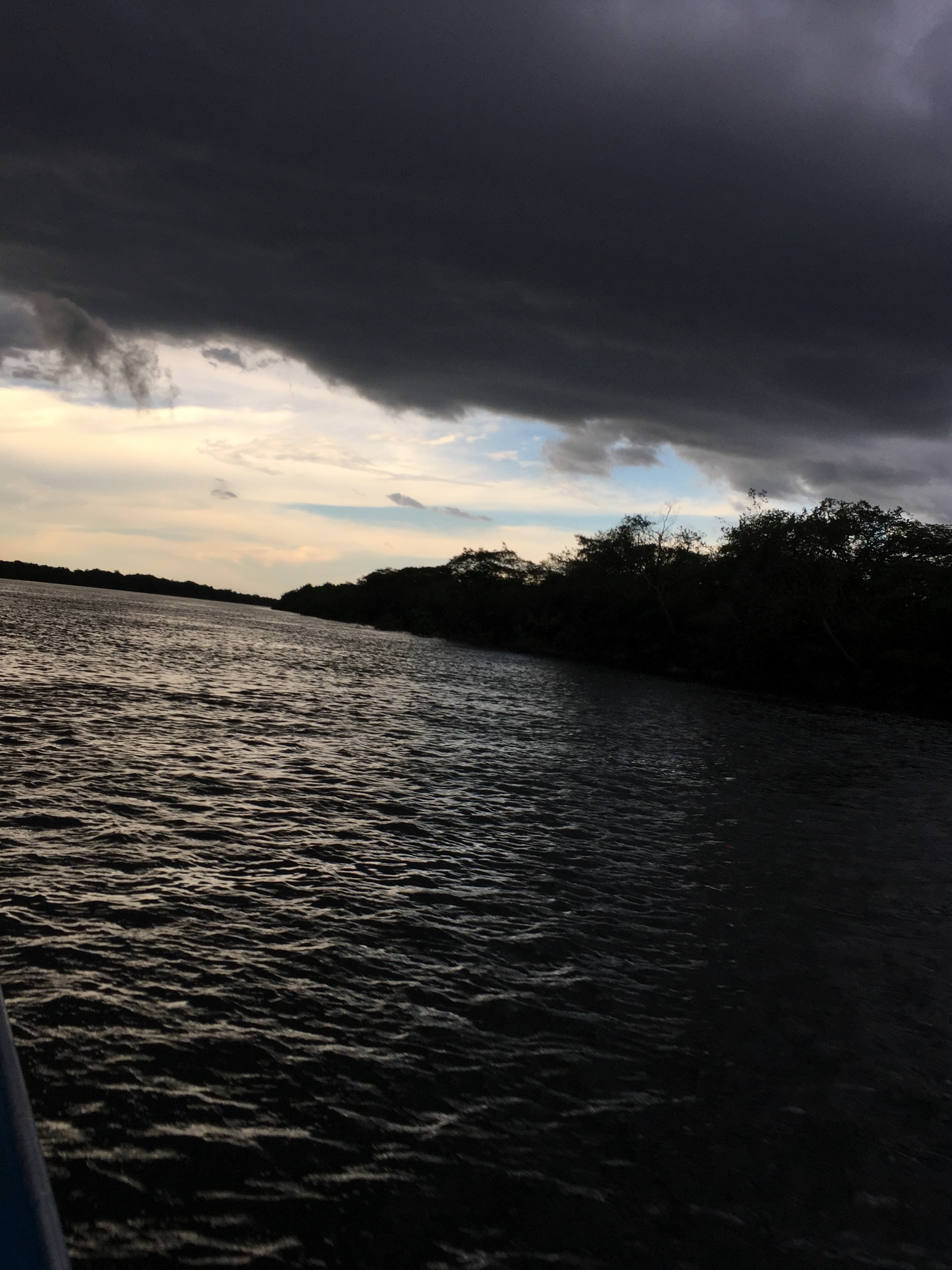
Cloudy afternoon at Cinaruco river

== See also ==
- List of rivers of Colombia
- List of rivers of Venezuela
