= Larry Larsen =

Larry Larsen is a United States freshwater sport fishermen and author. He is best known for catching peacock bass. He is Founder and President of the Peacock Bass Association.

He was born in 1945 in Wichita, Kansas where he received a bachelor's degree from Wichita State University. He later received a master's degree in engineering from Colorado State University.

Larsen is a prolific author of sport fishing books. Four of his books are on peacock bass, explaining their behaviors, habitats and the most effective techniques for catching them.

According to his website, Larsen's Outdoor Publishing, he has set seven peacock bass world line class records, including an all-tackle world record for the butterfly peacock bass (Cichla ocellaris). He also set a line class world record for Suwannee bass (Micropterus notius).

In addition, he set two all-tackle world records for the following: the saber-tooth payara (Hydrolicus scomberoides); the tarpon snook (Centropomus pectinatus); and the South American silver croaker, also known as the freshwater corvina (Plagioscion squamosissimus).

Larsen's achievements as a freshwater sport fisherman led to his 1999 induction into the National Fresh Water Fishing Hall of Fame in Hayward, Wisconsin as a "Legendary Angler."
