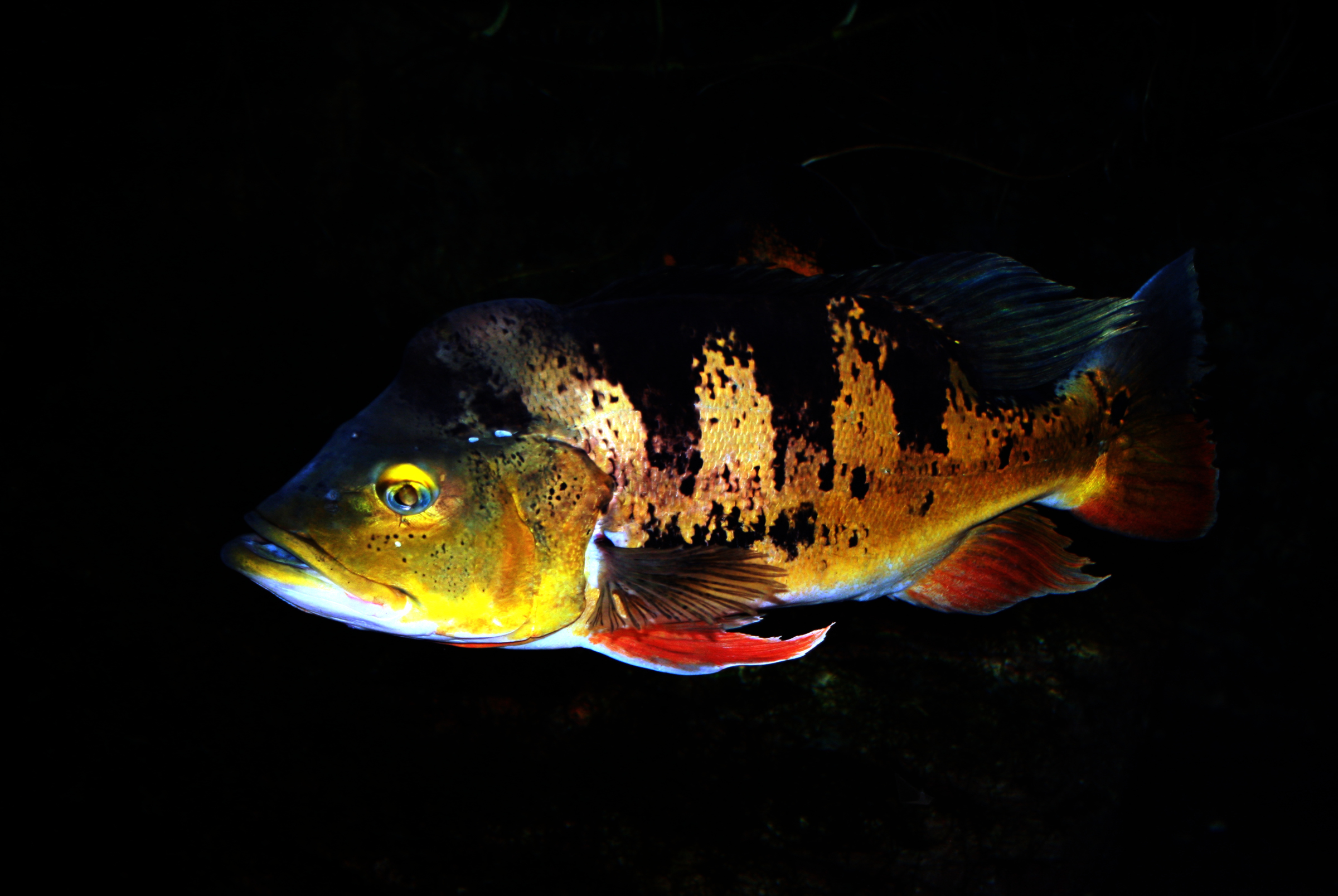
- Butterfly peacock bass (C. ocellaris)

Scientific classification
- Kingdom: Animalia
- Phylum: Chordata
- Class: Actinopterygii
- Division: Teleostei
- Order: Cichliformes
- Family: Cichlidae
- Tribe: Cichlini
- Genus: Cichla; Bloch & Schneider, 1801

Type species
- Cichla ocellaris Bloch & Schneider, 1801

Synonyms
- Acharnes Holmberg, 1891

= Peacock bass =

Genus of fishes

Peacock bass are large freshwater cichlids of the genus Cichla. These are diurnal predatory fishes native to the Amazon and Orinoco basins, as well as rivers of the Guianas, in tropical South America. They are sometimes referred to in English by their Brazilian name tucunaré or their Spanish name pavon. Despite the common name and their superficial similarity, they are not closely related to other fish known as bass, such as the North American largemouth bass (Micropterus salmoides).

Peacock bass are important food fish and are also considered valuable game fish. This has resulted in their accidental (escapees from fish farms) or deliberate (release by fishers) introduction to regions outside their native range, both elsewhere in South America, and in warm parts of North America and Asia. Singles have been caught elsewhere, including Australia, but do not appear to have become established there. Where established as an introduced species, they may become invasive and damage the ecosystem because of their highly predatory behavior, feeding extensively on smaller native fish.

The largest species in the genus, the speckled peacock bass (C. temensis), reaches up to 13 kg (29 lb) in weight and 1 m (3.3 ft) in length, possibly making it the largest species of cichlid (others suggest that record goes to the African giant cichlid, Boulengerochromis microlepis). Other peacock bass species are smaller.

== Common names ==
Many common names are used for these fish in Brazil, the country of their largest native region. The most popular of these is tucunaré. In Spanish, the generic common name for these cichlids is pavόn. Pavón, in Spanish, means "peacock", while the Brazilian name comes from Tupi, an indigenous language of Brazil, meaning "friend of the tree", as this peacock bass usually stays close to submerged trees to hunt and to protect itself and its nests.

== Description ==
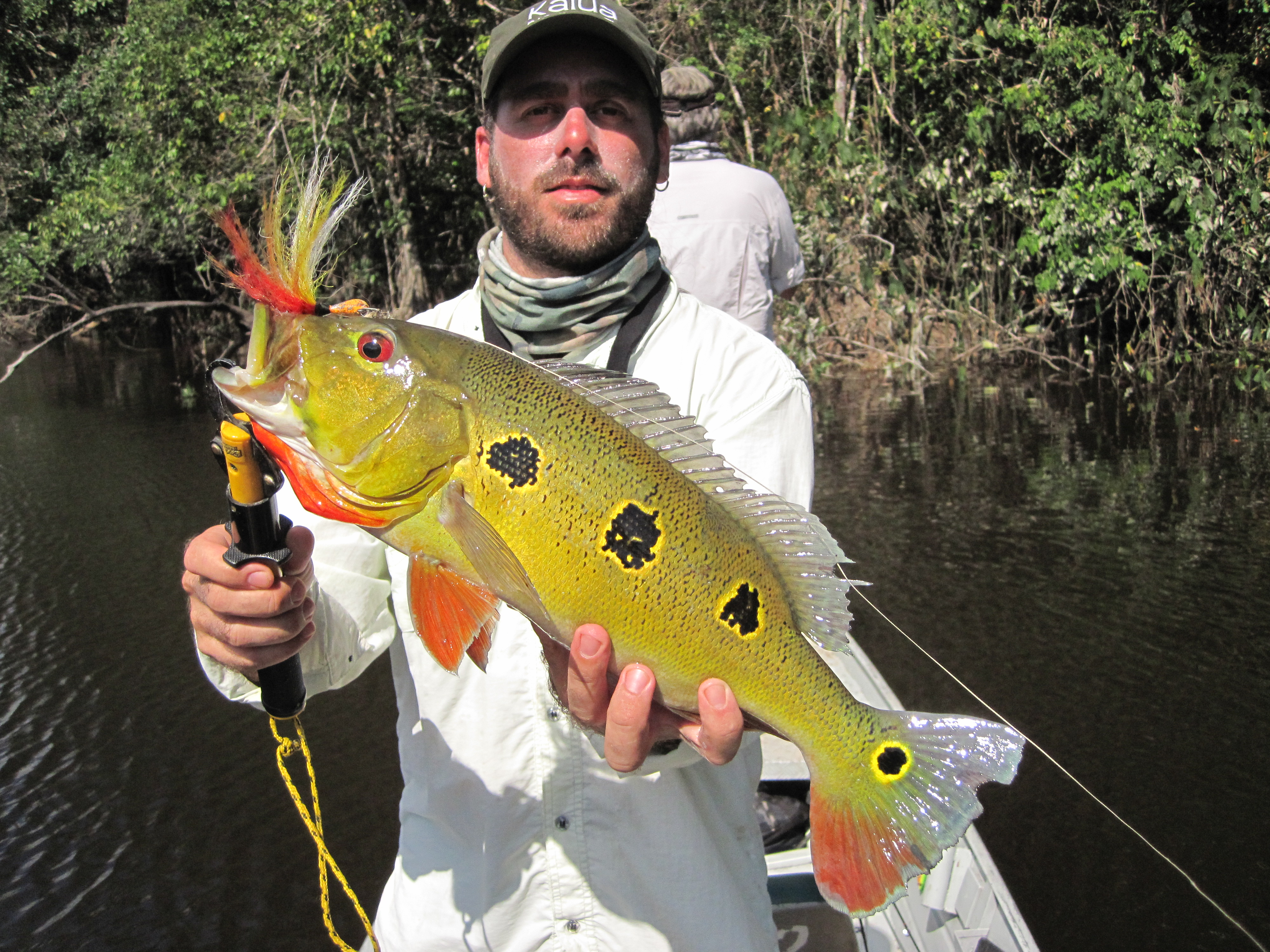
Adult Cichla orinocensis is easily recognized by its three large gold-edged spots (not bars) on the side of the body

The speckled peacock bass is the largest species and can grow to 1 m (3.3 ft) in length, and may be the largest of all cichlid fishes. Most display a color pattern based on a theme of three wide vertical stripes on their bodies, sometimes with smaller intermediate bands, on a grey, brown, yellow, or green background. They also exhibit a spot on their tail fins that resembles the eyes on a peacock's tail feathers—a feature which resulted in their common names (this "ocellus" is a common feature of South American cichlids, and is thought to deter predators and fin-biting piranhas). In addition, many adult fishes (primarily males, but also some females) develop a pronounced hump on their foreheads (nuchal hump) shortly before and during the rainy season, when the fishes generally spawn. Other physical traits can vary greatly, depending on the species, individual, and stage of development. These include dark rosettes instead of stripes, light speckles, and impressive shades of bright green, orange, blue, and gold. Very young fish exhibit dark horizontal stripes down half (C. orinocensis, C. ocellaris, et al.) or the whole (C. temensis, C. pinima, et al.) body.

== Taxonomy and species ==
Following a taxonomic review published in 2006, 15 Cichla species are recognized by FishBase:

Image	Scientific name	Common name	Distribution
	Cichla cataractae Sabaj, López-Fernández, Willis, Hemraj, Taphorn & Winemiller, 2020		Essequibo River basin.
	Cichla intermedia Machado-Allison, 1971	Royal peacock bass	Orinoco River basin in Venezuela and Colombia.
	Cichla jariina S. O. Kullander & E. J. G. Ferreira, 2006	Jari peacock bass	Brazil.
	Cichla kelberi S. O. Kullander & E. J. G. Ferreira, 2006	Kelberi peacock bass	Brazil.
	Cichla melaniae S. O. Kullander & E. J. G. Ferreira, 2006	Xingu peacock bass	Brazil, restricted to the Lower Rio Xingu drainage.
	Cichla mirianae S. O. Kullander & E. J. G. Ferreira, 2006	Tapajós peacock bass	Brazil.
	Cichla monoculus Agassiz, 1831	monoculus peacock bass, tucanare peacock bass	Rio Solimões-Amazonas along the main channel and lower courses of tributaries; Peru, Colombia and Brazil; including Araguari and lower Oyapock rivers north of the Amazon.
	Cichla nigromaculata Jardine & R. H. Schomburgk, 1843		Upper Orinoco and Casiquiare tributaries and the middle Rio Negro.
	Cichla ocellaris Bloch & J. G. Schneider, 1801	butterfly peacock bass	Marowijne drainage in Suriname and French Guiana to the Essequibo drainage in Guyana.
	Cichla orinocensis Humboldt, 1821	Orinoco peacock bass	Orinoco River basin, in tributaries of the Orinoco River in Colombia and Venezuela; Amazon River basin, in the Negro River basin, Brazil.
	Cichla pinima S. O. Kullander & E. J. G. Ferreira, 2006	spotted peacock bass	Brazil.
	Cichla piquiti S. O. Kullander & E. J. G. Ferreira, 2006	blue peacock bass	South America.
	Cichla pleiozona S. O. Kullander & E. J. G. Ferreira, 2006	Lake Gatun peacock bass	Bolivian Amazon basin including the Rio Madre de Dios, Beni, Mamoré, and Guaporé river drainages of Bolivia and Brazil; and in Rio Jamari, a tributary of the Rio Madeira.
	Cichla temensis Humboldt, 1821	speckled pavon, speckled peacock bass, three-barred peacock bass	Amazon River basin in the Negro and Uatumã River drainages; Orinoco River basin in tributaries of the Orinoco River in Venezuela and Colombia.
	Cichla thyrorus S. O. Kullander & E. J. G. Ferreira, 2006	Trombetas peacock bass	Brazil.
	Cichla vazzoleri S. O. Kullander & E. J. G. Ferreira, 2006	Vazzoler's peacock bass	Brazil.

Traditionally, only five peacock bass were recognized, but in the review in 2006, nine new species were described and C. nigromaculata was revalidated. In general, the various species are similar in proportions and most meristics, but differ in colour pattern (and range). This is similar to other diurnal cichlids, where visual clues play an important role in the behavior, including breeding. The speckled or three-barred peacock bass (C. temensis) in particular has caused problems due to its extensive variation, but the speckled pattern has now been shown to be present in nonbreeders and the three-barred when breeding. Although minor variations are known from adults of other peacock bass species, none shows the extreme variation of the speckled/three-barred peacock bass.

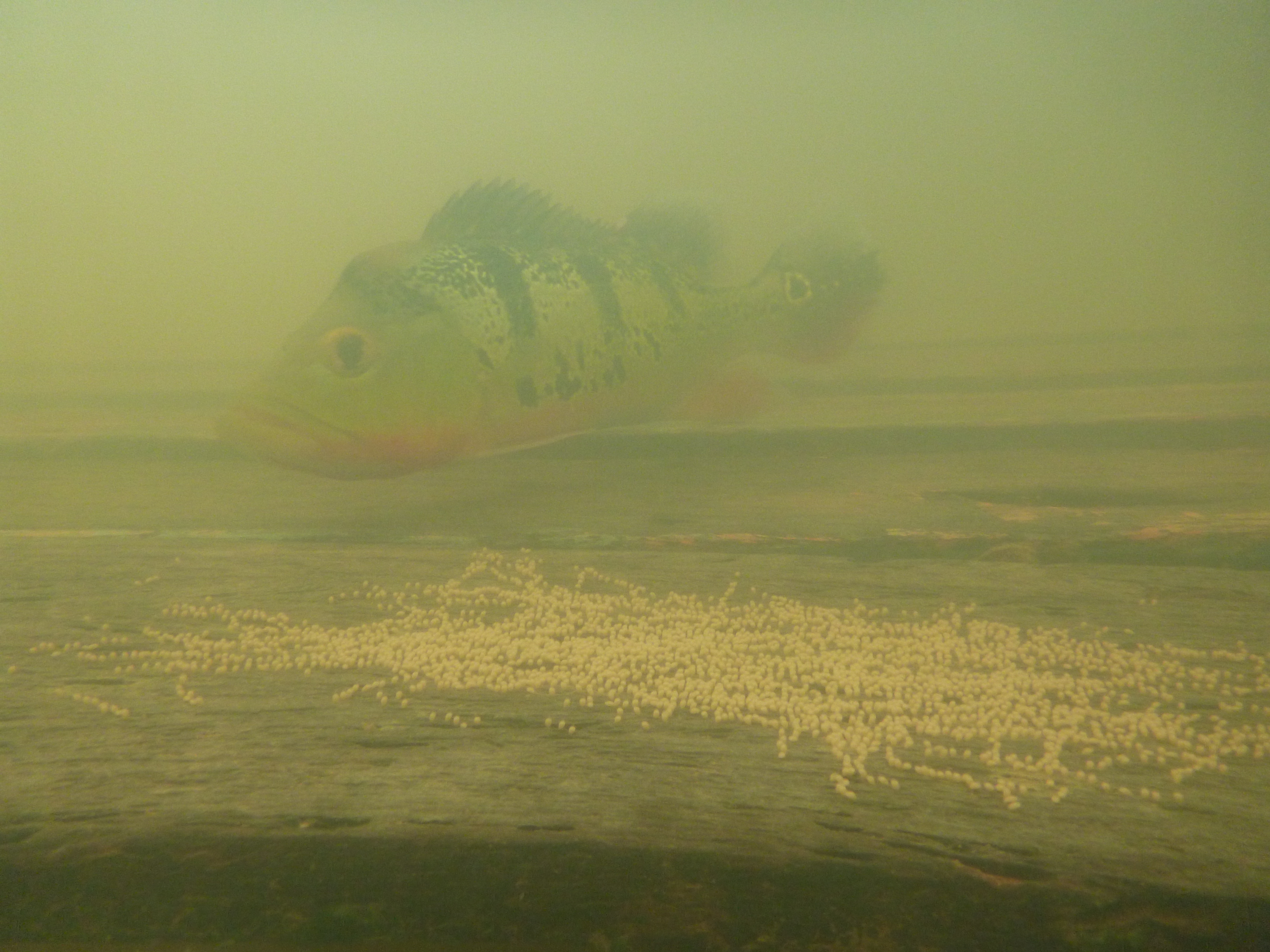
Male (Cichla sp.) guarding eggs, at the Uatumã Biological Reserve (Brazil)

A genetic study published in 2012 has cast doubt on the validity of some of the species recognized in the review in 2006. Aside from limited hybridization among many species, in both natural and human-altered environments, several species do not show sufficient differentiation to imply reproductive isolation and/or a history of independent evolution. Among the species implicated as probable "good" species were C. intermedia, C. orinocensis, C. temensis, C. melaniae, C. mirianae, and C. piquiti. The other species were suggested to be part of two widespread meta-species or species complexes, called Cichla pinima sensu lato (including C. jariina, C. thyrorus, and C. vazzoleri) and C. ocellaris sensu lato (including C. monoculus, C. nigromaculata, C. pleiozona, and C. kelberi). In contrast, a genetic study published in 2007 suggested that two of those demoted taxa, C. monoculus and C. pleiozona, are valid species (this study lacked samples from some of the more localized proposed species).

A 2020 study described a new species, C. cataractae.

The peacock bass genus Cichla has been placed by some authorities as the only genus in the monogeneric tribe Cichlini.

== Relation to humans ==
=== As gamefish ===
Sport fishermen have made these cichlids prized game fish for their fighting qualities, so much so that many travel agencies now arrange fishing trips to Brazil and Florida specifically to catch peacock bass.

Renowned American peacock bass fisherman and fishing author, Larry Larsen, refers to them as "freshwater bullies" due to their ferocious nature when hunting and their tendency to damage and sometimes destroy fishing gear when striking.

The most common techniques for catching these cichlids are similar to those for catching largemouth bass, with the notable exception that peacock bass usually will not strike artificial worms, a widely used lure among largemouth bass fisherman. In addition, fly fishing techniques, including lures such as poppers and large streamers, are becoming increasingly popular for catching them.

=== Aquaculture ===
Tilapia farmers sometimes keep peacock bass to eat any spawn that occur among their fish, in addition to eating any invasive fish that pose a threat to young tilapia (e.g. sunfish, piranha). Spawning and brood-raising reduce the growth rate of the tilapia, so introduction of Cichla is thought to maintain a high growth rate in the tilapia.

They are also raised commercially for the aquarium trade; Asia is one of the main sources for aquacultured peacock bass. As a large predatory fish they are informally referred to as "monster fish".

Peacock bass prey on any species that catches their eye, but those in which they seem most interested are tilapia, crayfish, tadpoles, mosquitofish, minnows, and guppies. Also, they will eat their own young when other fish are scarce.

=== Eating quality ===
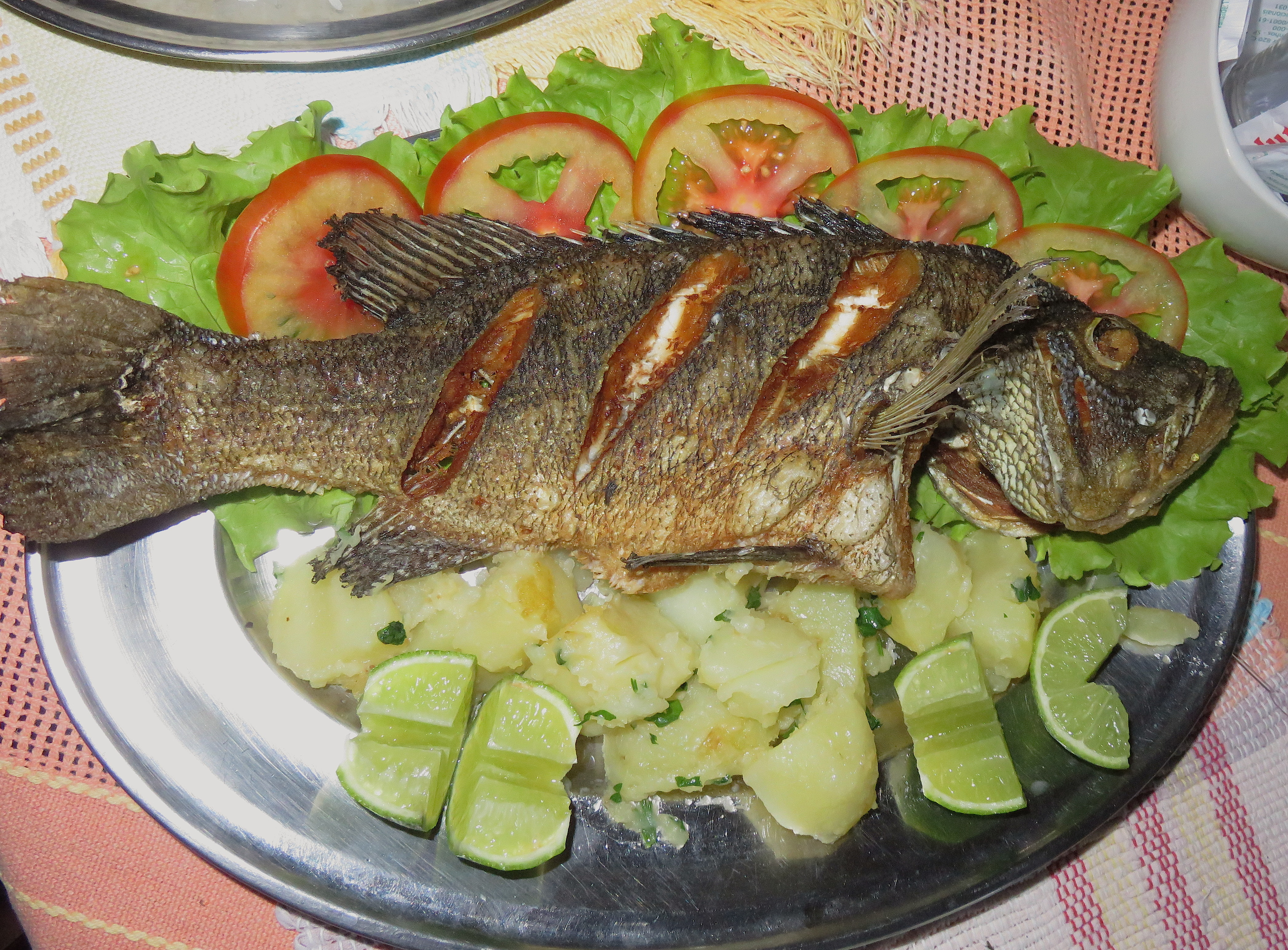
A serving of peacock bass

Their eating quality is very good. Their flesh is white and sweet when cooked, and has very little oil, making it similar in taste to snapper or grouper. Also, they are not excessively bony. However, most professional American anglers recommend practicing catch and release for these species to protect their numbers in the United States. To help ensure this, Florida Fish and Wildlife Conservation Commission officers strictly enforce bag limits for these fish.

=== Aquaria ===
Peacock bass are often kept in aquaria, being a popular type of "monster fish" which require a very large tank, even for the smallest species.

=== As an invasive ===
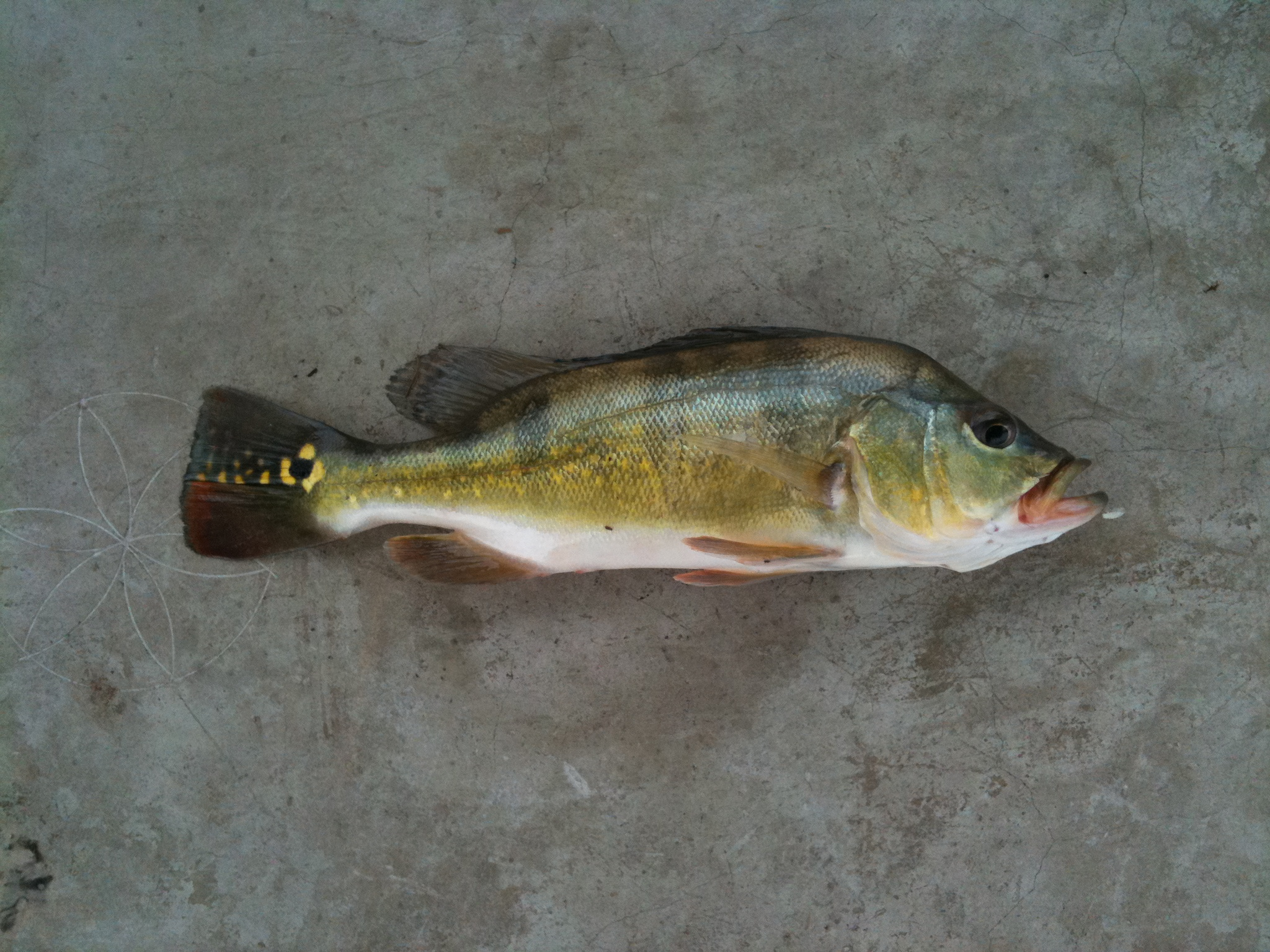
Peacock bass caught in Singapore

Peacock bass have been identified as invasive species and cause of ecological imbalances in some of their introduced areas.

Peacock bass introduction in the Rosana Reservoir and upper Paraná River, both in Brazil, resulted in a 95% decline in native fish density and 80% decline in richness in only two years.

Few measures can protect native fish once peacock bass have been introduced. Reduction in native species' richness in lakes with introduced peacock bass was observed in all of the Gatun-area lakes, regardless of the presence of macrophyte refugia. After initial increases in abundance, introduced peacock bass often deplete local prey and resort to cannibalism.

==== In Panama's Gatun Lake ====
Cichla cf. ocellaris was unintentionally introduced into Panama via a freshwater creek in the Rio Chagres drainage region in the late 1950s (experts are not certain of the exact date). A well-known aquarist and medical doctor began raising peacock bass in a small pond in his back yard for sale as aquarium fish. Within a year, heavy rains flooded the pond, causing some fry to escape into a nearby creek which drained into Gatun Lake. By 1964, the lake and nearby rivers and creeks were overrun with the cichlids, providing sport fishing opportunities that had not existed previously. Since then, C. cf. ocellaris has become the dominant sport fish species in the area.

The presence of peacock bass in Panama has caused significant damage to the native fish assemblage, by eliminating seven of eleven previously common fish species, and significantly reducing three others. Local extinctions and a decrease in abundance of many species led to cascading second-order effects on zooplankton and tertiary consumer communities. Malaria incidence was reported to have risen significantly in the area around Gatun following the elimination of prey fishes that had previously kept the mosquito population at lower levels. This is an example of how species introductions can have explicit consequences for human health.

==== In Florida ====
In 1984, after 10 years of study, Florida officials deliberately introduced butterfly peacock bass and speckled peacock bass to the southern region of that state to prey on other non-native species, including the oscar (Astronotus ocellatus), Midas cichlid (Amphilophus citrinellus), and spotted tilapia (Tilapia mariae). Their introduction also provided additional sport fishing opportunities for anglers. While the butterfly peacock bass has flourished in Florida, the speckled peacock bass has not. Therefore, it is now illegal to kill or possess speckled peacock bass in Florida. The butterfly peacock bass tends to flourish in the canals and fresh waterways throughout south Florida.

Because of their tropical origins, peacock bass cannot tolerate low water temperatures. This has prevented them from becoming abundant in Florida outside of Palm Beach, Broward, and Miami-Dade Counties. However, reports of them have extended to other counties in South Florida such as Collier, Lee County, Florida, and Hendry counties. Especially near Alligator Alley.

=== Conservation status ===
The IUCN has not investigated the conservation status of any peacock bass species. Therefore, they do not appear on its red list. Some of the species have relatively small distributions, and C. melaniae is restricted to the lower Xingu River in an area that will be heavily affected by the Belo Monte Dam.
