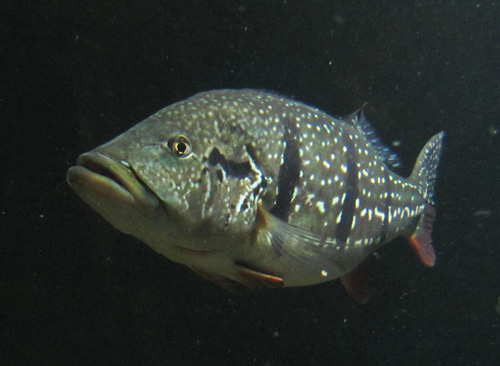

Conservation status
- Least Concern (IUCN 3.1)

Scientific classification
- Kingdom: Animalia
- Phylum: Chordata
- Class: Actinopterygii
- Order: Cichliformes
- Family: Cichlidae
- Genus: Cichla
- Species: C. temensis

Binomial name
- Cichla temensis Humboldt, 1821

Synonyms
- Cichla atabapensis Humboldt, 1821; Cichla tucunare Heckel, 1840; Cychla trifasciata Jardine & Schomburgk, 1843; Cychla flavomaculata Jardine & Schomburgk, 1843; Cichla unitaeniatus Magalhaes, 1931

= Cichla temensis =

Species of fish

Cichla temensis, the speckled peacock bass, painted pavon, royal pavon, speckled pavon, three-barred peacock bass, or striped tucunaré, is a very large South American cichlid. Reaching nearly 1 m (3.3 ft) in length, it is the largest cichlid of the Americas, and one of the largest extant cichlids in the world. It is an important predator in its native waterways, as well as a prized food fish and game fish, which has led to a number of attempted introductions outside of its native range.

== Nomenclature ==
The generic name Cichla is taken from the Greek word kikhle, while the specific name is apparently a reference to the Temi river in Venezuela, which was the type locality.

The common name tucunaré is from Brazilian Portuguese, while pavon is Spanish.

== Description ==
C. temensis resembles other peacock bass species, but is generally more elongate and slender in body shape. It is one of the largest cichlids in the world, reaching a maximum recorded length of 99 centimetres (39 in) and 12.2 kg (27 lb) in weight (though the International Game Fish Association has certified a record of 28.5 lb (12.9 kilograms)), with only the African giant cichlid (Boulengerochromis microlepis) possibly reaching similar proportions. C. temensis is characterized by possessing a post-orbital band (the dark marking between the eye and the opening of the gills), as opposed to other Cichla species which have either irregular blotches or lack them entirely. It is closest in overall patterning to C. pinima and C. vazzoleri.

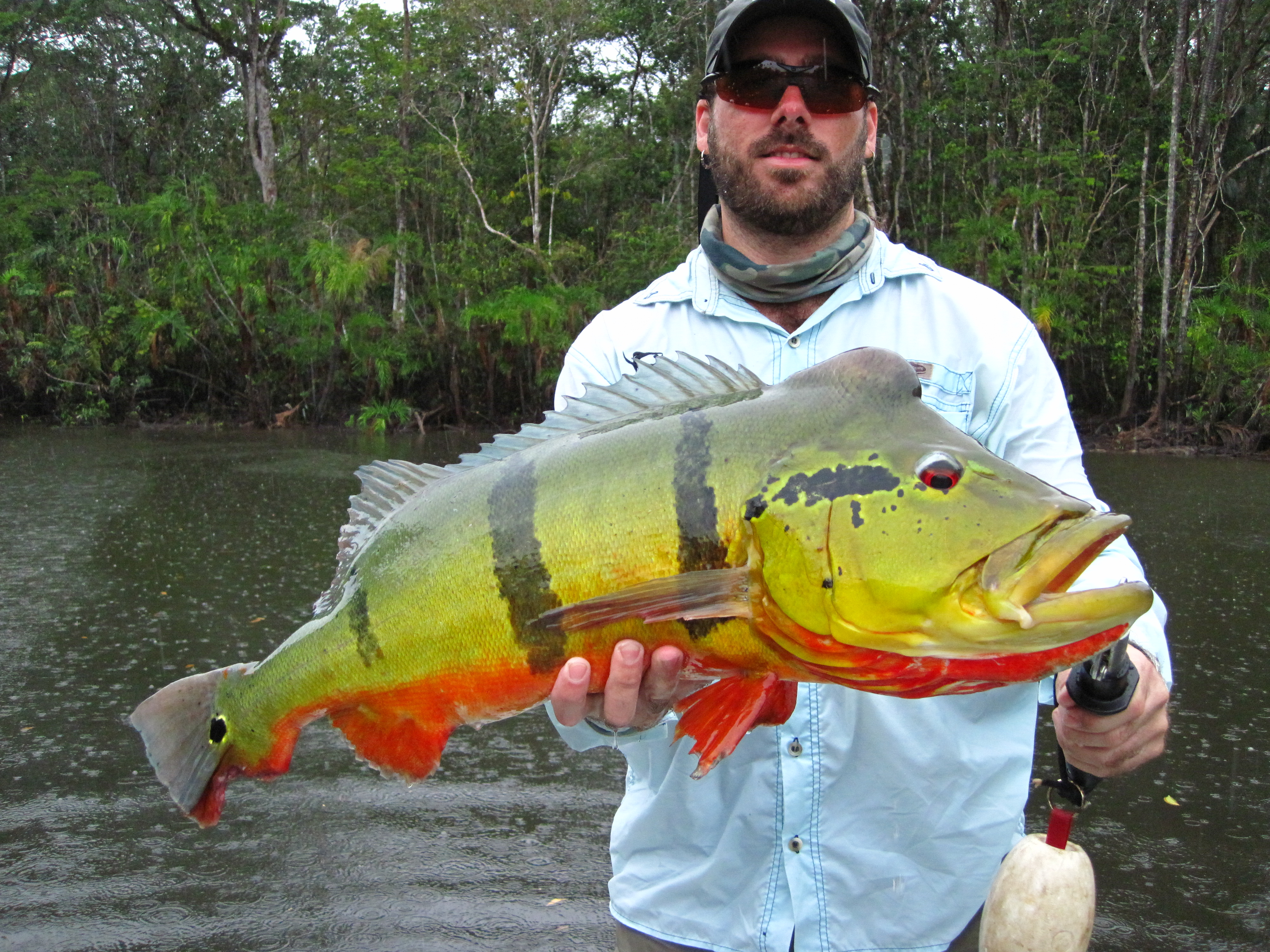
Adult in breeding coloration, termed the tucunaré açu. Note the injured lower lobe of the tail.

Adults are highly variable in colour pattern, which has historically caused confusion; some authors speculated that the variants were a separate species or sexual dimorphism. Only in 2012 was it firmly established that the differing color morphs were seasonal; dark individuals with dense, light-hued speckles - called the speckled peacock or tucunaré paca - are the non-breeding individuals, while breeding adults - the three-barred peacock or tucunaré açu - lose the pale speckles entirely but develop a golden-olive coloration which contrasts highly with the dark bars on their flanks, and a vibrantly colored ventral region. During the breeding season, some males also develop a bulbous forehead; or the nuchal hump, which is the only visible point of difference between the genders. The study also distinguished 2 other morphs, or grades, intermediate between the two mentioned prior. The 4 distinct grades were confirmed not to be the result of sexual dimorphism or regional variation through analysis of morphology and genetics. This variation in pattern is greater than what was observed between individuals of C. orinocensis and C. monoculus.

The maximum age reported for this species is 9 years.

== Distribution ==
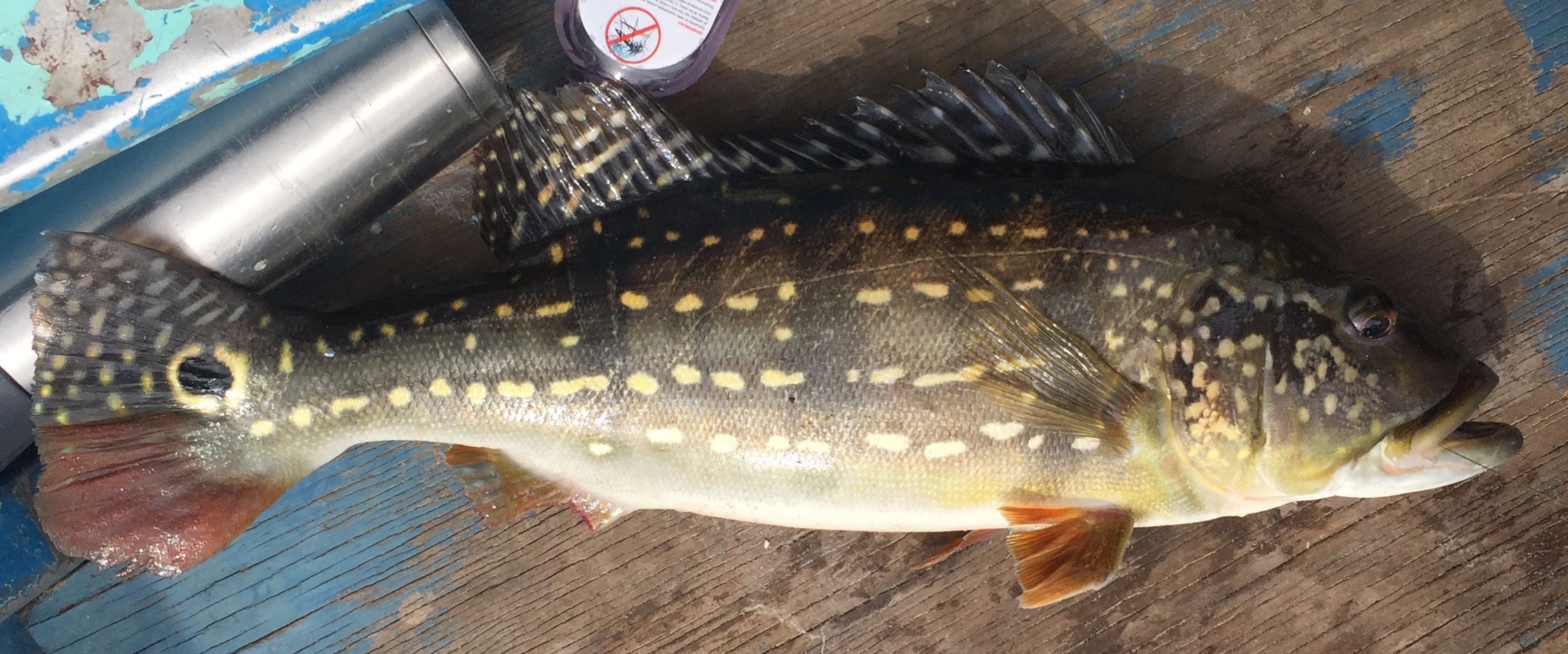
Cinaruco River

C. temensis is native to the Orinoco and Rio Negro basins, as well as several smaller rivers in the central Amazon (Uatumã, Preto da Eva, Puraquequara, and Tefé), in Brazil, Colombia, Venezuela, and Guyana.

Introduction attempts have been made outside its native range, but it has not managed to become established in Florida or Texas due to extreme temperatures. In contrast, it has flourished in tropical Singapore and Malaysia. The Singaporean population is thought to be reproductive.

== Biology ==
The species is benthopelagic, found near the shoreline of lagoons and areas of the main river channel with sandy or rocky banks. In its native range, it is essentially restricted to blackwater rivers and their tributaries. They are comfortable in waterways with little cover, but non-breeding individuals may shelter near submerged wooden debris to avoid predation. The species had mostly been studied during the dry season; its habits during the rainy season are less known. C. temensis are largely sedentary, but occasionally, some individuals are known to have migrated across flood plains to other river tributaries during the rainy season. They may hunt in schools, which may result in feeding frenzies when encountering prey.

=== Feeding ===
C. temensis is a diurnal predator, hunting fish that it can swallow whole; it has been described as a potential keystone predator. Their feeding activity is the highest between 9 AM and 3 PM on warm sunny days. The coloration of the non-breeding tucunaré paca, a dark olive with extensive speckling all over, is theorized to provide an excellent camouflage in the tannin-stained waters and the dappled light in the flooded forests, allowing it to ambush prey in the tangled environs. Larger body size allowed for the consumption of larger prey items, though trophic position varied on locality, with observable differences in diet between similar size classes even within the same river basin. Diet composition and trophic positions of different-sized C. temensis did not meaningfully differ, though values of δ^{13}C were notably higher in larger peacock bass.

Small prey items include the tetra Hemigrammus analis, Nannostomus pencil fish, anostomids, Cyphocharax, Curimata vittata, Lycengraulis anchovies, Rhabdolichops nigrimans knifefish, and pike cichlids. C. temensis is noted to hunt larger prey than other sympatric peacock bass, hunting down a variety of fish such as the characiformes of the genus Argonectes, Semaprochilodus kneri, and Acestrorhynchus heterolepis; Pimelodella sp., Pimelodus albofasciatus, armoured catfish such as Ancistrus, Osteoglossum arowana, and cichlids including smaller peacock bass, although cannibalism might be more prevalent in fish stuck in isolated lagoons and reservoirs during the dry season, and the exact species of consumed peacock bass cannot be determined. Juvenile prochilods on migration are preyed on heavily by the opportunistic peacock bass, at times comprising nearly half of the biomass consumed by C. temensis. This glut of food allows the peacock bass to reach a healthy breeding condition.

=== Spawning ===
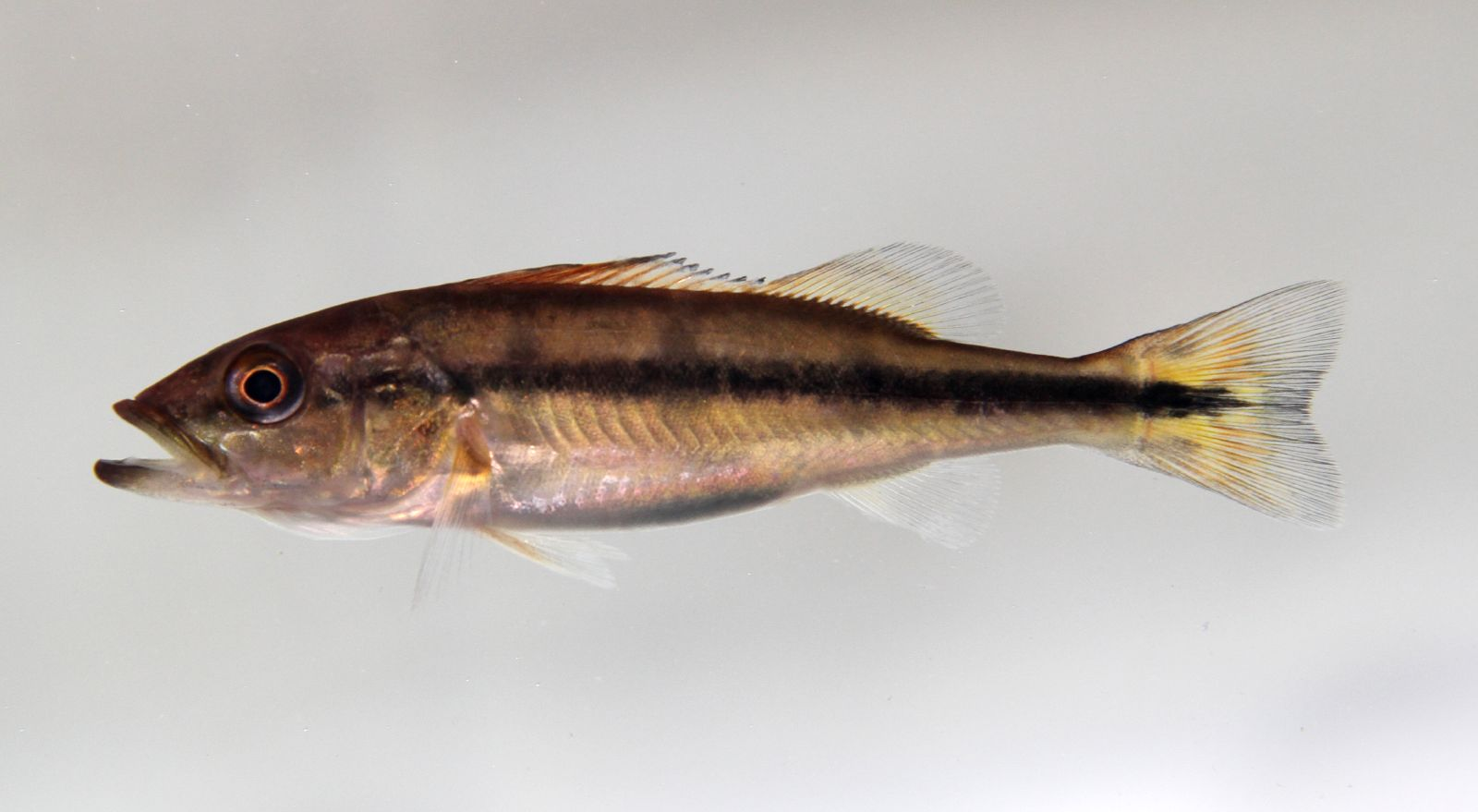
Juvenile

Cichla temensis begin breeding at the end of the dry season, and part of the population likely continues breeding in the ensuing rising-water period and rainy season. Due to strong seasonal variation and extent of provided parental care, the species is typically restricted to breeding once a year in its natural flood-pulse river habitat. The tucunaré açu are visibly "blockier" in appearance than non-breeding adults, having a higher ratio of height:standard length; some of this is due to the formation of fat deposits on the body. C. temensis may begin breeding at a total length of ~300 millimetres (12 in); males tend to be bigger than their partners, though exceptions occur, with males recorded with weights ranging from around 20% of to more than 300% the body mass of the female.

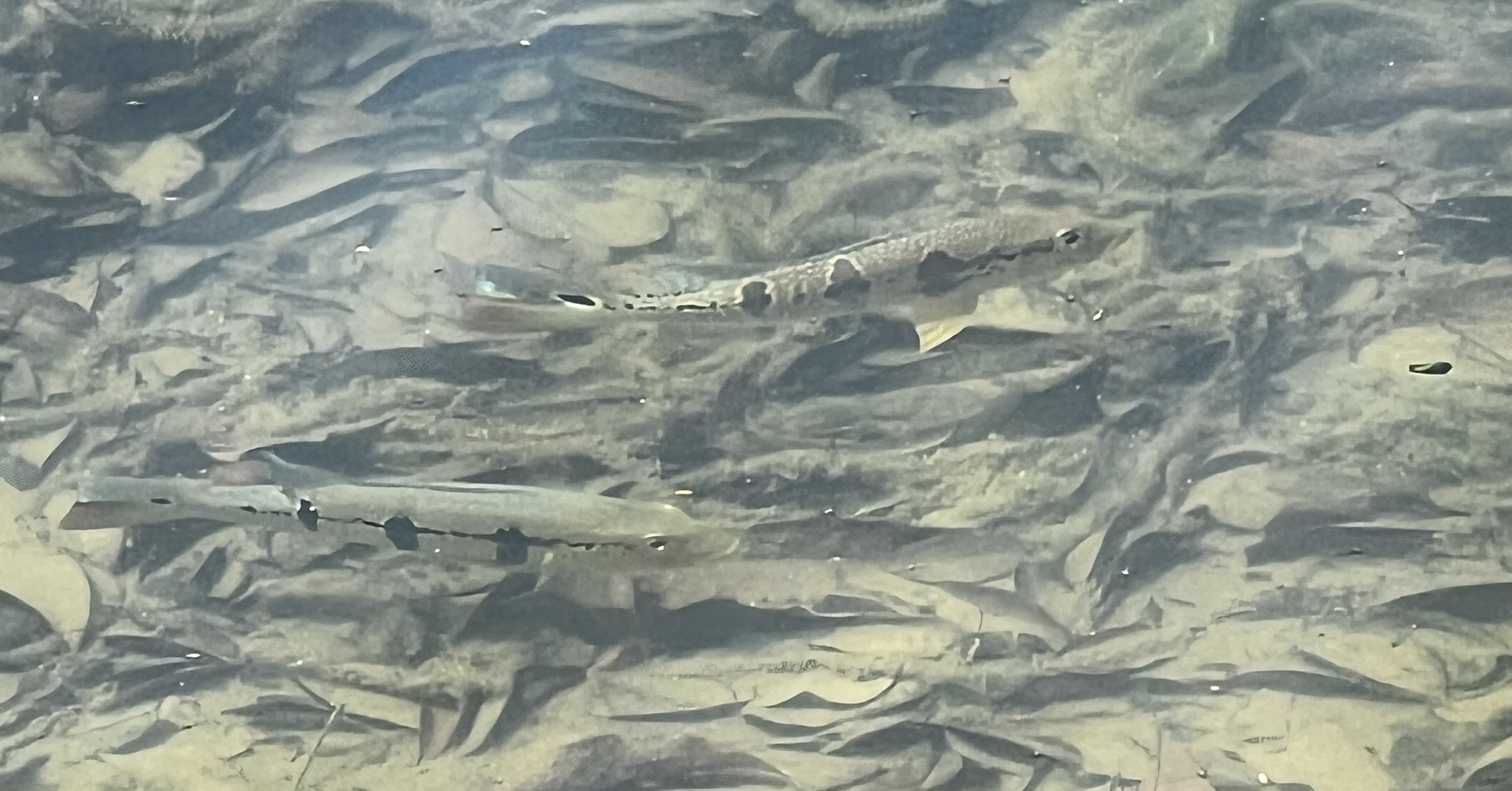
Hybrid peacock bass with Cichla temensis ancestry, Singapore

Pairs prepare a site with adequate hardscape - such as a rock or live or dead standing tree - at a depth of 1–1.5 metres (3.3–4.9 ft) to adhere their eggs to. The male clears the area of detritus and may dig small pits to position the newly-hatched larvae. The female's fecundity ranges from under 2000 eggs to over 10000, which may be correlated to her body mass. While they do not mouthbrood their fry like some other cichlids, one or both parents vigilantly guard their brood - and the subsequent school of fry - from potential predators, fasting all throughout this period. The fry hatch after 48 hours, and become free swimming after 2-3 days of absorbing their yolk. The planktivorous fry are guarded for about 2 months or until they reach about 60 mm standard length, after which they disperse and begin their independent lives. Dispersed juvenile fish may form shoals with their fellows. Juveniles feed upon shrimp, insects, and other arthropods. Peacock bass are prone to interspecific hybridization; Cichla temensis itself has been found to naturally hybridize with Cichla monoculus in the Central Amazon.

=== Natural threats ===
The amazon river dolphin and the piranha Serrasalmus manueli have been noted to attack various species of peacock bass, including C. temensis, that were hooked or being released. Additionally, piscivorous snakes, black caiman, and giant river otter also preys on C. temensis. This peacock bass is parasitized by the crustaceans Amazolernaea sannerae and Argulus multicolor along with the trematodes Aspidocotylus cochleariformis and Clinostomum heluans.

== Relation to humans ==
C. temensis is fished both commercially and for sport; akin to other peacock bass, it is a popular gamefish due to its energetic fight when hooked, and it is locally eaten.

=== Sportsfishing ===
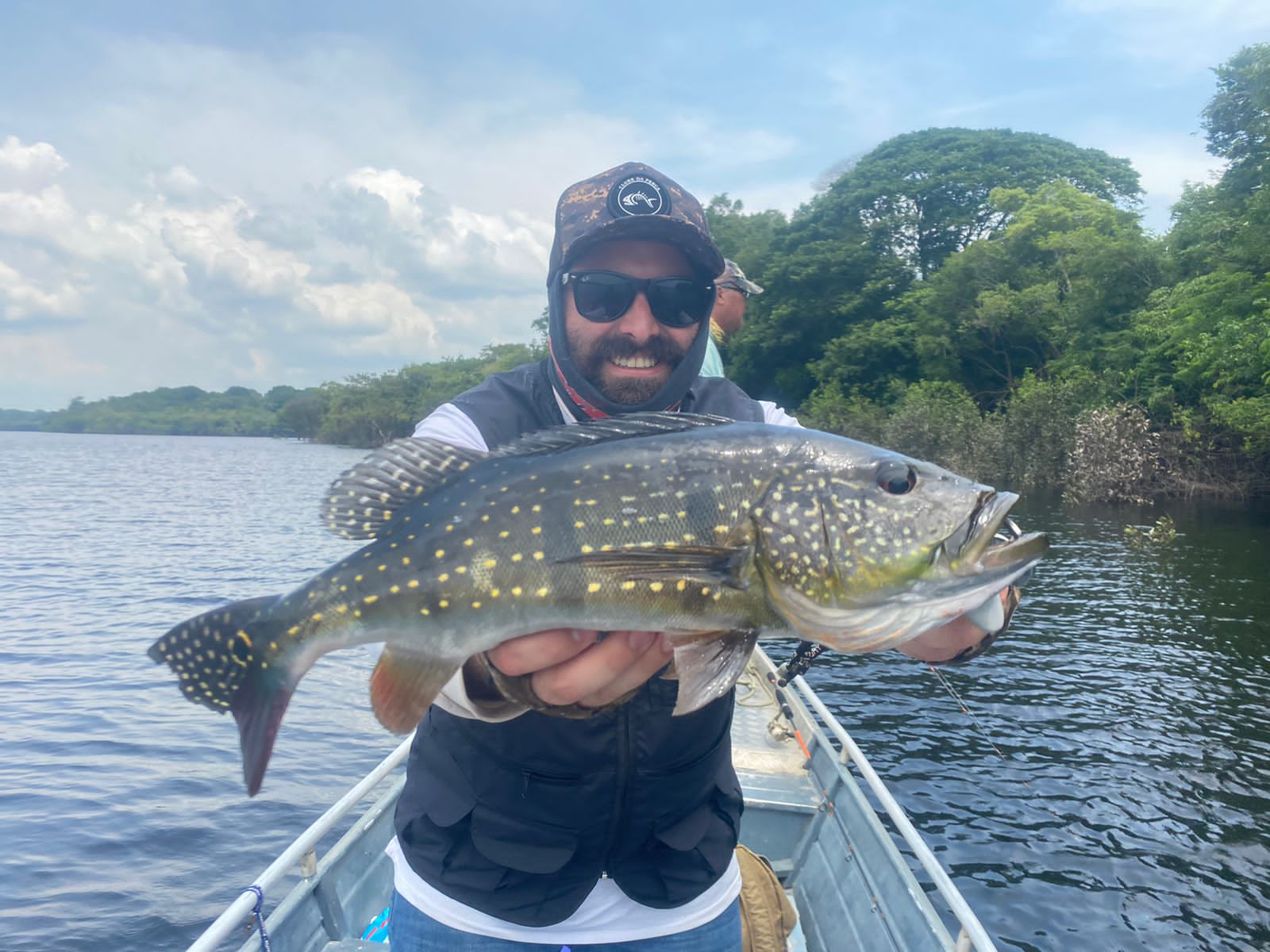
Speckled form

Generally, peacock bass are most common in areas with minimal current, such as lagoons and oxbow lakes, near sandy beaches in the main river channel, and particularly, the transition point between flooded jungle and the beach. Fly fishing with a fast- or medium fast-action rod is a proven strategy, though may need to be adapted for high water periods. As ambush predators relying on cover such as vegetation, peacock bass often run back to cover when hooked, which complicates efforts to capture them. Fighting a peacock bass larger than 20 lb (9.1 kg) has been described as "trying to stop a freight train rolling downhill"; peacock bass in general are prized gamefish for their power, challenge, and spectacle they offer to sportsfishermen. The Marié River is reputed as the source of multiple Cichla temensis world records.

Peacock bass were introduced to Florida for the purpose of sportsfishing; peacock bass fishing is regulated in Florida, although C. temensis itself was not successfully established and was not restocked.

=== As food ===
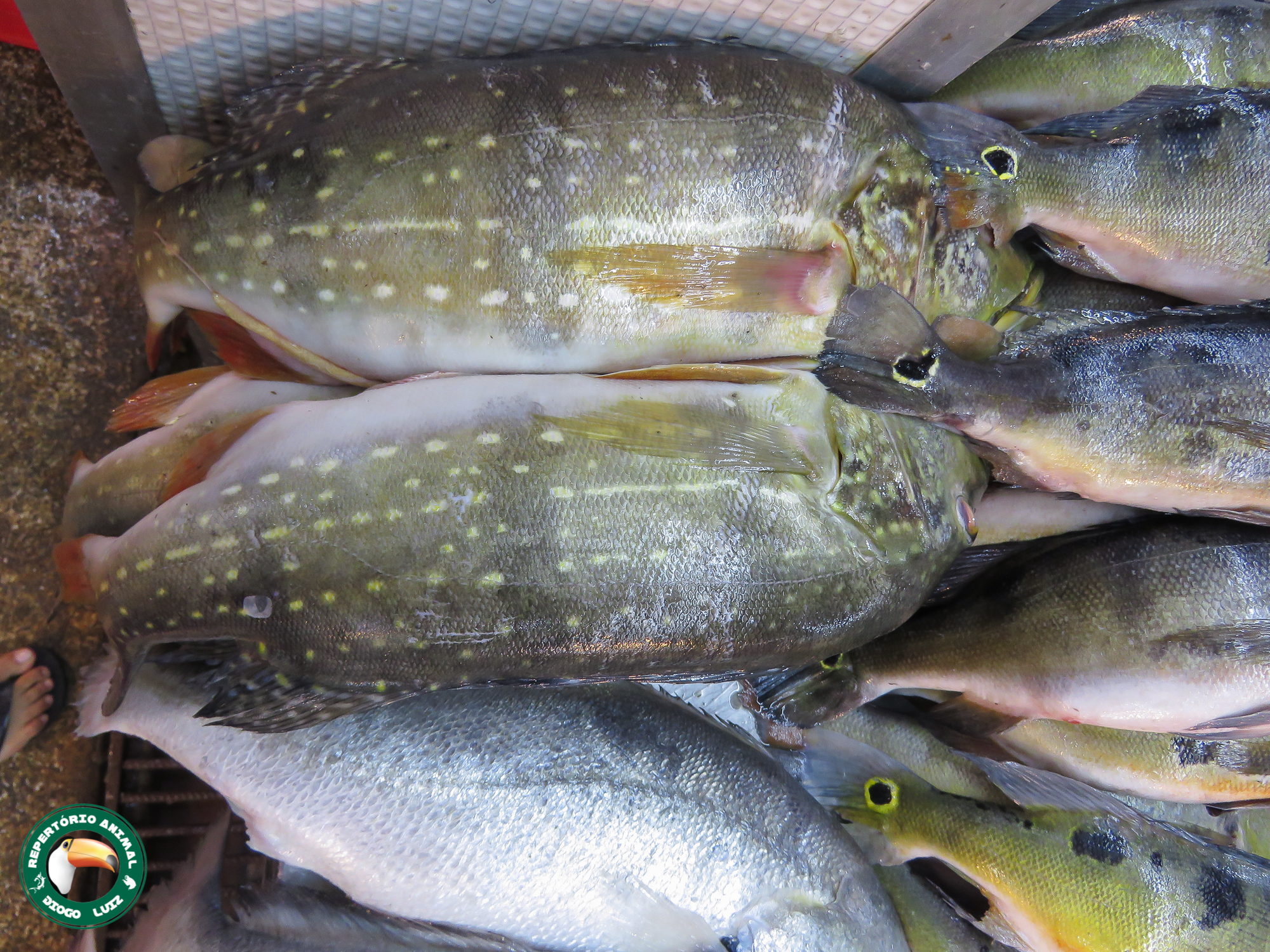
Cichla temensis among other fish on a fishmonger's stand

The species, alongside other peacock bass, is fished intensively in its native range, but the effects of this fishery is not well studied despite its importance; some authorities deem it as the most important inland fishery of South America, but research into distinct stocks are ongoing. Evidence suggests that hydroelectric dams both promoted genetic divergence and increased the population size of the upstream population, as these peacock bass adapted to the newly inundated regions.

=== In the aquarium ===
Like other peacock bass, Cichla temensis may be kept in aquaria, though their size requires a huge aquarium with ample swimming space, and with a tight-fitting lid to prevent escapes. Filtration of dissolved metabolites, such as ammonia, nitrite, and nitrate, is important in keeping the fish in good health, along with maintaining appropriately warm temperatures around 70–80 °F (21–27 °C).
