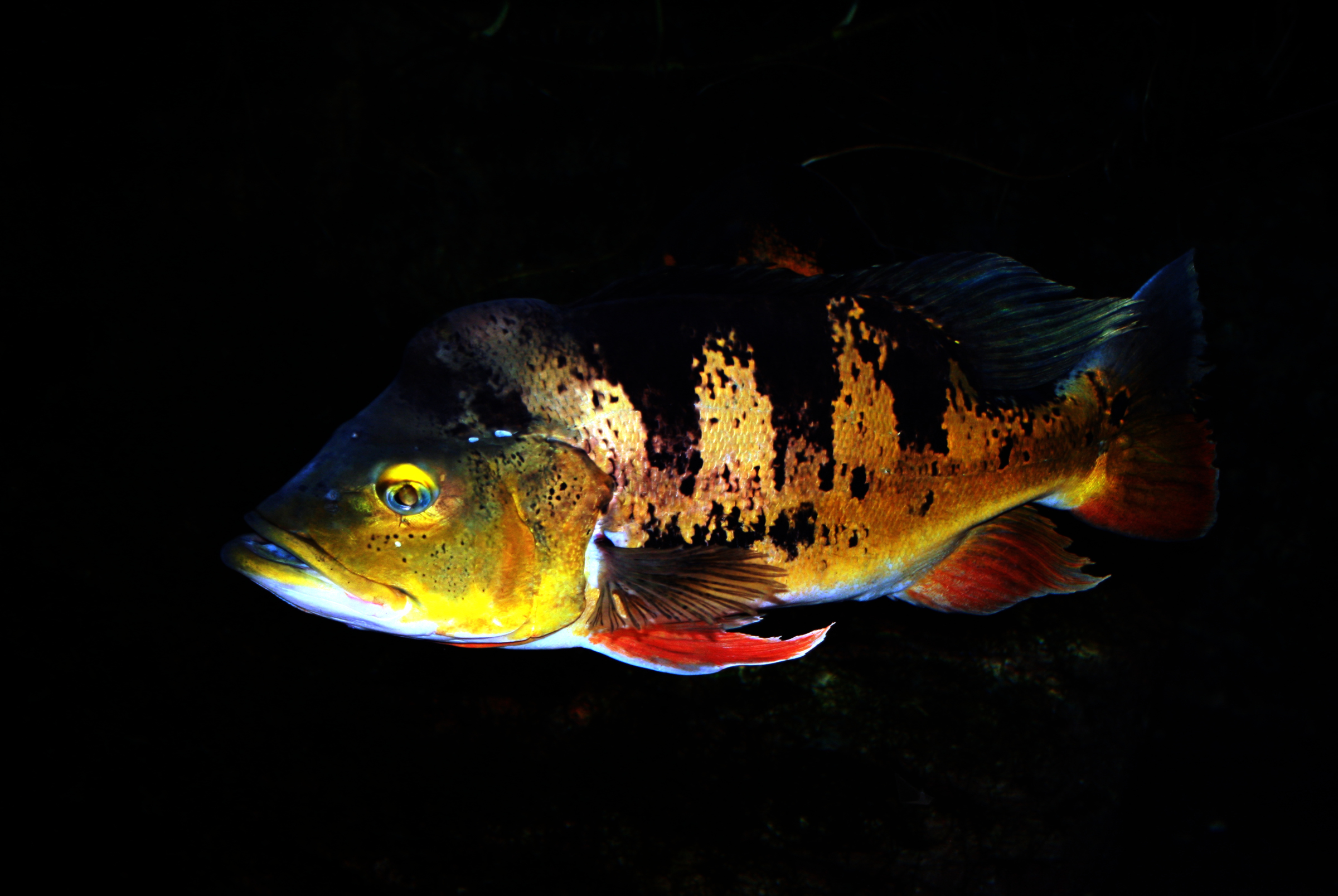
- At Safari Park Dvůr Králové, Czech Republic

Conservation status
- Least Concern (IUCN 3.1)

Scientific classification
- Kingdom: Animalia
- Phylum: Chordata
- Class: Actinopterygii
- Order: Cichliformes
- Family: Cichlidae
- Genus: Cichla
- Species: C. ocellaris

Binomial name
- Cichla ocellaris Bloch & J. G. Schneider, 1801

Synonyms
- Acharnes speciosus Müller & Troschel, 1849

= Cichla ocellaris =

Species of fish

Cichla ocellaris, sometimes known as the butterfly peacock bass ("peacock bass" is also used for some of its relatives), is a very large species of cichlid from South America, and a prized game fish. It reaches 74 cm (29 in) in length. It is native to the Marowijne and Essequibo drainages in the Guianas, and the Branco River in Brazil. It has also been introduced to regions outside its natural range (e.g., Florida, Hawaii, and Puerto Rico), but some uncertainty exists over the exact identity, and at least some of the introductions may involve another Cichla species or hybrids. It is frequently confused with C. monoculus. Studies conclude that the introduction of Cichla ocellaris does not negatively impact fish communities in Florida, making it an effective fisheries management tool.

== Appearance and identification ==
Similarly shaped in body size compared to the largemouth bass, the butterfly peacock bass can reach lengths of up to 29 in (740 mm), but averages 12–14 in (300–360 mm) in length. Body and fin colors range from yellows, greens, and light red to orange. While color is extremely variable, the most prominent physical characteristics are the three vertical black lines along the sides of the body. With having the tendency to fade, these lines may not be found on some older fish. The common name of the fish originates from the black spot with a yellow halo surrounding. This spot is located on the caudal fin and resembles the feathers of a peacock.

== Spawning habits and locations ==
Spawning season for the fish is between April and September, with a height in May and June. Like other bass, adult fish create large flat surfaces that are hardened down near the shore in order to serve as a spawn location. Once the eggs are laid, both adults are responsible for protecting them from prey.

== Growth and age ==
The growth from spawn to the average length of 12–14 inches progresses rapidly throughout the first 16–18 months of life. Upon additional growth beyond the average, a fish can potentially add up to 1.5 pounds of weight with every extra inch grown. Average lifespan for the Butterfly Peacock Bass is 6–10 years.

== Origins and habitat ==
Native to the tropical Americas, the true Cichla ocellaris is restricted to the Guianas. The species thrives in warm, slow-moving bodies of water including lakes, ponds, canals, and rock pits. Like other species of bass, they tend to inhabit shaded areas under trees, bridges, and culverts. Butterfly peacock bass cannot survive in salinities exceeding 18 ppt, nor can they live in temperatures less than 60 degrees Fahrenheit.

== Current distribution ==
In 1984, the Florida Fish and Game Commission introduced the species to the lakes and rivers of Miami-Dade County, in south Florida. Upon introduction, roughly 10,000 young fish were introduced to the Miami-Dade County area via releasing the juveniles into the lakes and canals. Distribution throughout the area can be attributed to the travel of this species through the warm, freshwater canals of Florida. It is thought that these fish inhabit up to 300 miles (500 km) of canals specifically. Due to the fish's inability to tolerate salt water and low water temperatures, this species of fish is typically found only in the Miami-Dade and Broward County areas of Florida, with a few sightings in Texas and Louisiana.

This species has also been introduced in large numbers to Trị An Lake in Vietnam

== Ecological and feeding habits ==
The introduction of the butterfly peacock bass to Florida has successfully aided in managing and controlling tilapia and oscar populations that once were a threat via overpopulation. The fish primarily feeds on fish allowing for them to be roleplayers in the balancing of a habitat. These fish typically feed during daylight hours where visibility is better for hunting. Like other bass, they use their incredible speed and large mouth to capture prey.

== Game fishing ==
Regarded as the most popular sportfish in south Florida, millions of game fishermen travel each year to fish for Butterfly Peacock Bass, spending about 8 million dollars combined in resources and efforts. The fish is available to boat fishermen along with fishermen located on the shore. The species is fished similarly to largemouth bass, with shiners used as live bait and topwater jigs and jerkbaits as suggested tackle. Florida includes a daily bag limit of two fish, with a maximum length of 17 in (430 mm).

== Edibility ==
The edibility of the fish is considered to be very good, as it provides a clean and flaky white filet. Many people refer to it as having a "non-fishy" taste.
