= Capanaparo River =

Coordinates: 7.0297°N 67.1056°W

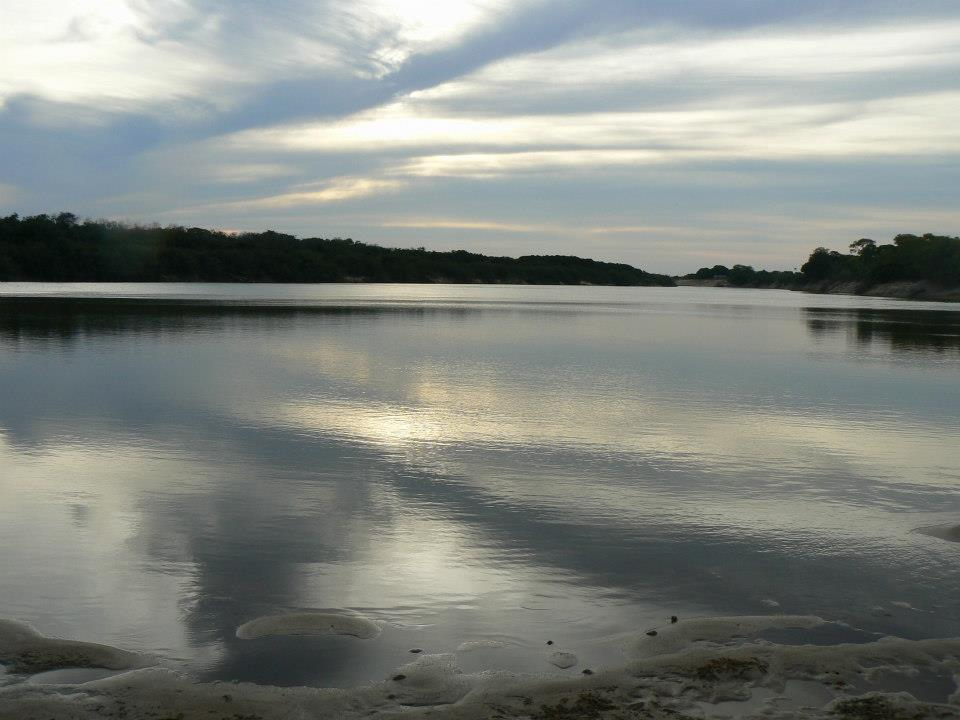
- Capanaparo River in Apure, Venezuela

- Location within Venezuela

Location
- Countries: Venezuela; Colombia

Capanaparo River is a river of Colombia and Venezuela. It is part of the Orinoco River basin in Venezuela. Together with the Cinaruco River, other smaller rivers and the area around them they form the Santos Luzardo National Park since 1988.

== See also ==
- List of rivers of Colombia
- List of rivers of Venezuela
