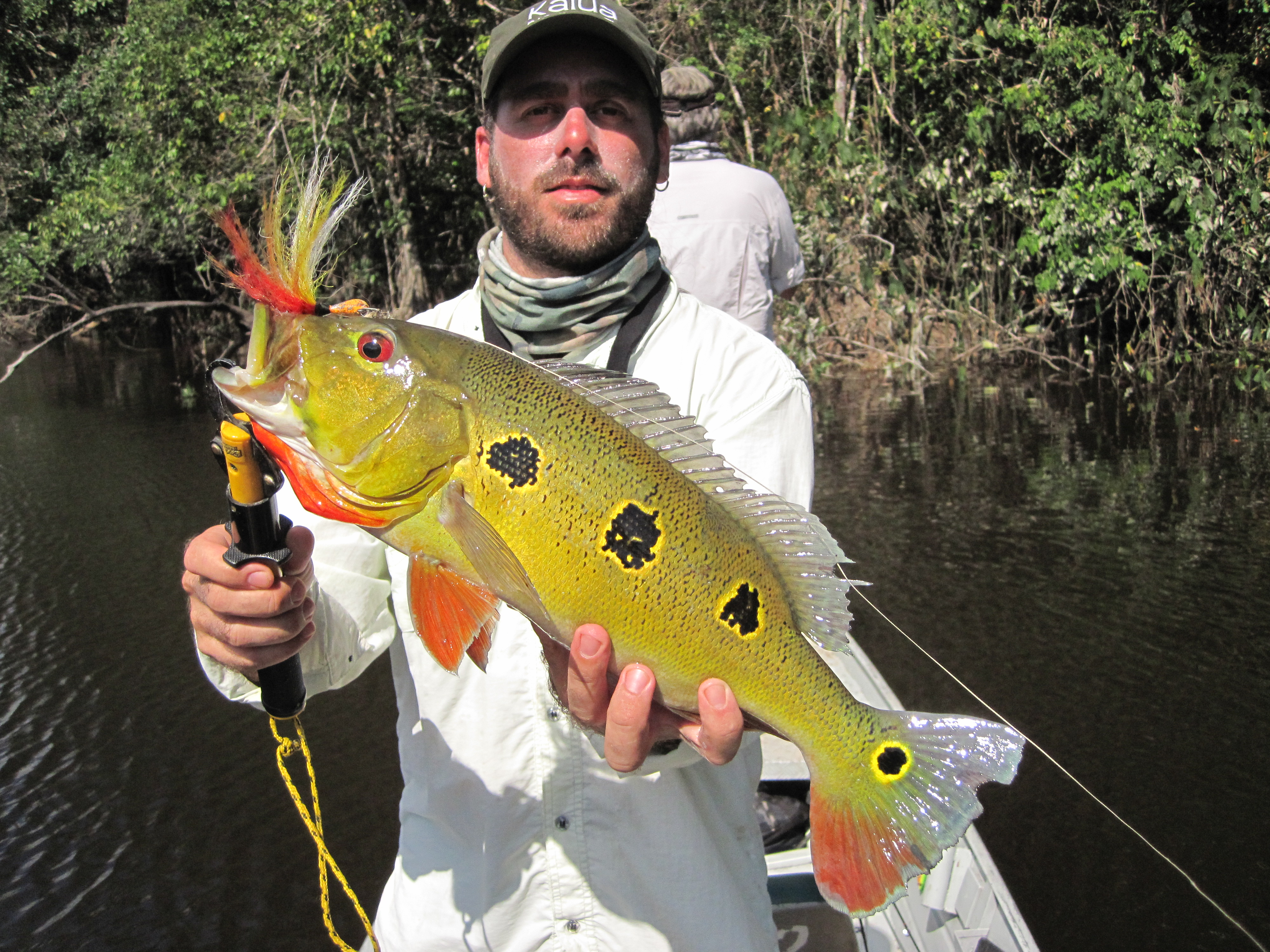

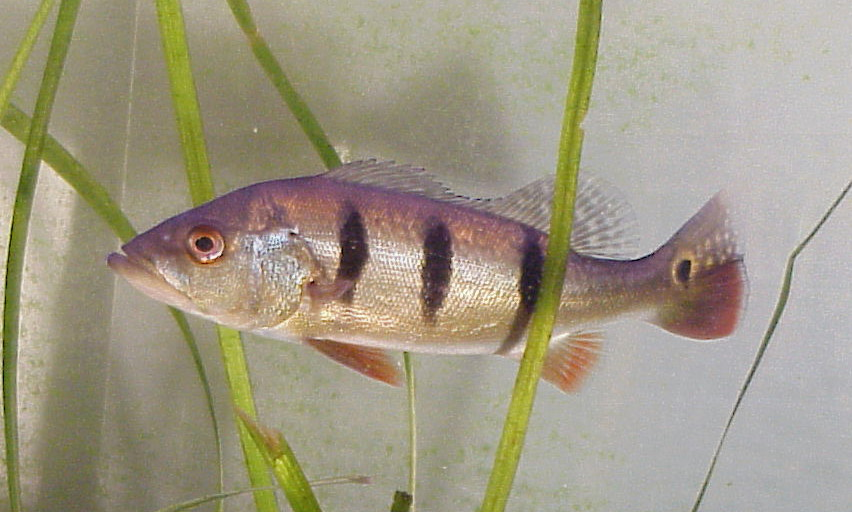
- Adult above, juvenile below

Conservation status
- Least Concern (IUCN 3.1)

Scientific classification
- Kingdom: Animalia
- Phylum: Chordata
- Class: Actinopterygii
- Order: Cichliformes
- Family: Cichlidae
- Genus: Cichla
- Species: C. orinocensis

Binomial name
- Cichla orinocensis Humboldt, 1821

= Cichla orinocensis =

Species of fish

Cichla orinocensis, sometimes known as the Orinoco peacock bass, tucunaré or tucunaré miri, is a very large species of cichlid. This peacock bass is native to the Rio Negro and Orinoco River basins in northern South America. It mainly occurs in blackwater rivers. Despite the name, it is not the only peacock bass in the Orinoco, as the river also is home to C. intermedia, C. nigromaculata, and C. temensis. Where it overlaps with the last species, C. orinocensis prefers more slow-moving and shallow waters. They are able to tolerate more turbid waters than other species of peacock bass.

It reaches up to about 62 cm (2 ft) in standard length. Adults are easily recognized by the three large gold-edged dark spots on the side of their body (a fourth spot on the tail) and lack of dark markings on the operculum.

A genetic study has indicated a clear divergence between the Orinoco and Rio Negro populations. If split, the Orinoco would retain the scientific name C. orinocensis.
