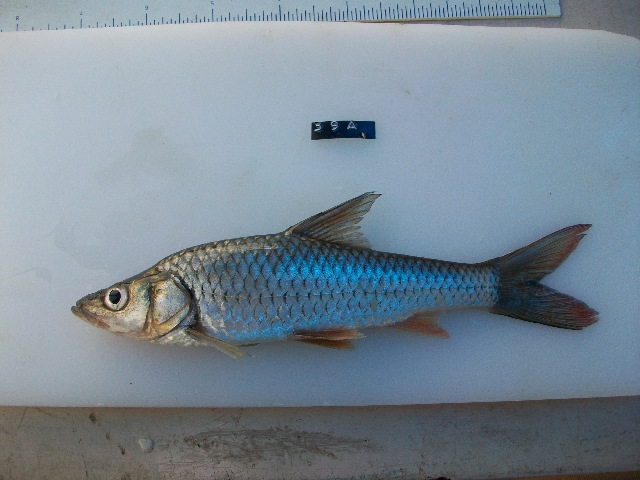

Conservation status
- Least Concern (IUCN 3.1)

Scientific classification
- Kingdom: Animalia
- Phylum: Chordata
- Class: Actinopterygii
- Division: Teleostei
- Order: Cypriniformes
- Family: Cyprinidae
- Subfamily: Smiliogastrinae
- Genus: Enteromius
- Species: E. mattozi

Binomial name
- Enteromius mattozi A. R. P. Guimarães, 1884

Synonyms
- Barbus mottozi Guimaraes, 1884; Barbus rapax Steindachner, 1894; Barbus sauvagei Pellegrin, 1912; Barbus serrula Gilchrist & Thompson, 1913

= Papermouth =

Species of fish

The papermouth (Enteromius mattozi), also known as the silverfish, is a species of ray-finned fish in the genus Enteromius.

== Description ==
The papermouth has a silvery body with orange coloured fins. The dorsal fin is serrated and its scales are marked with radial striations. It grows to a maximum length of 40 cm (16 in) and a weight of 1.4 kg (3.1 lb). The mouth is positioned terminally. It has a protractile mouth.

== Distribution ==
The papermouth is found in southern and central Africa from the Congo Basin through Angola south to the Limpopo, including the upper Zambezi. It can also be found in artificial impoundments in southern Africa.

== Biology ==
The papermouth is a benthopelagic, potamodromous fish which occurs naturally in the larger pools of perennial rivers, which are cooler than the shallows. It is common in artificial lakes such as reservoirs and farm dams and is often introduced into these. It is an actively predatory species, feeding on small planktonic crustaceans and insects when it is juvenile and preying on small fish when adult. It will also feed on the seeds of water lilies, algae and aquatic plants. In turn, the papermouth is a prey species for birds, otters, large catfish and larger conspecifics. After the first summer rains, the papermouth migrates upstream in the flooded rivers to spawn. This species matures at three years old and the oldest recorded fish was 9 years old.

== Human interactions ==
The papermouth is an aggressive fish and this makes it a popular target for anglers and fly fishers and is harvested for human consumption. In some parts of its range it is thought to be declining, but the IUCN class the species as being of "Least Concern", although they note that there are potential threats from pollution and overfishing.

== Taxonomy ==
The name Barbus mattozi was originally applied to specimens taken from the Cuanza and Cunene in Angola and Namibia. The specimens taken in the Limpopo were named as Barbus rapax. The status of the papermouth in the Zambezi, where it is a rare species, is uncertain, the species has been widely introduced to dams in Zimbabwe and the specimens taken in the Zambezi may be escapes from these artificially stocked populations. Some authorities, therefore, consider that Enteromius mattozi and Enteromius rapax should be treated as separate species.
