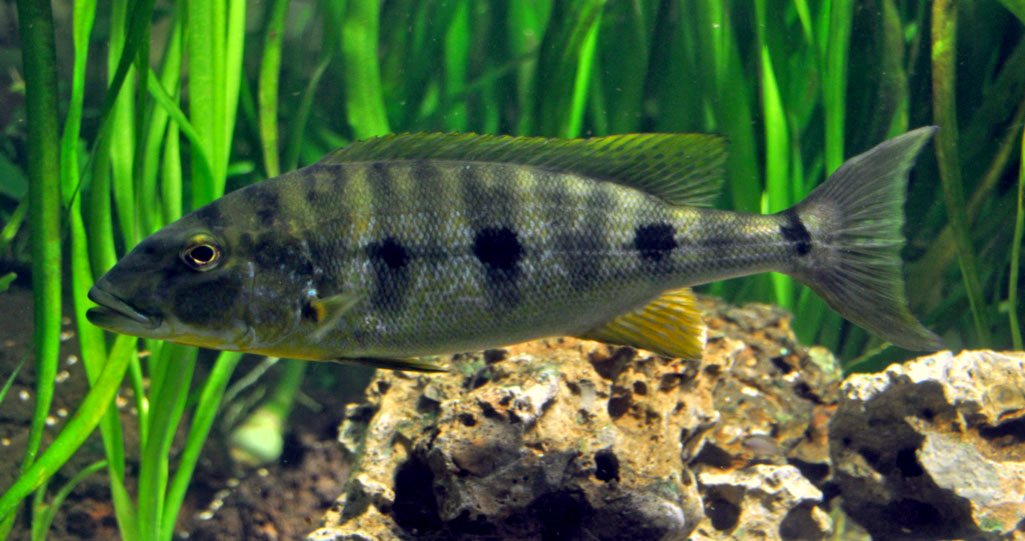

Conservation status
- Least Concern (IUCN 3.1)

Scientific classification
- Kingdom: Animalia
- Phylum: Chordata
- Class: Actinopterygii
- Order: Cichliformes
- Family: Cichlidae
- Subfamily: Pseudocrenilabrinae
- Tribe: Boulengerochromini; Takahashi, 2003
- Genus: Boulengerochromis; Pellegrin, 1904
- Species: B. microlepis

Binomial name
- Boulengerochromis microlepis (Boulenger, 1899)

= Giant cichlid =

Species of fish

The giant cichlid (Boulengerochromis microlepis), also known as the emperor cichlid, is a species of fish in the family Cichlidae, endemic to Lake Tanganyika in Africa. It is the only member of its genus Boulengerochromis and tribe Boulengerochromini.

== Appearance, habitat and behavior ==
Males reach a length up to 90 cm (3.0 ft) and females up to 75 cm (2.5 ft), possibly making it the largest extant species of cichlid; only the speckled peacock bass (Cichla temensis) of South America attains similar sizes as an adult.

The giant cichlid is endemic to Lake Tanganyika, where it occurs in portions of the lake controlled by Burundi, the Democratic Republic of the Congo, Tanzania, and Zambia. Within this range it is a relatively common species found in coastal areas to depths of 100 m (330 ft). Adults are chiefly piscivorous while juveniles are omnivores; they also display habitat differences related to age, with adults living in small pelagic foraging groups when not spawning while juveniles use shallower, rock-strewn waters for the protective cover they provide. They are occasionally offered for sale as aquarium fish, but their enormous adult size makes them ill-suited for all but the largest private and public aquariums.

== Taxonomy and etymology ==
The species was originally described as Tilapia microlepis by George Albert Boulenger in 1899. Realizing that it was not a tilapia, the genus Boulengerochromis was coined in 1904 by Jacques Pellegrin.

The generic name of this species is a compound noun, made up of the surname Boulenger, in honour of the Belgian born herpetologist and ichthyologist George Albert Boulenger (1858–1937), and the Greek word chromis which was used by Aristotle for a type of fish. This was probably the drum Sciaenidae and may be derived from the word chroemo which means "to neigh" in reference to the noise made by drums. This word was applied to a number of percomorph fishes, such as damselfish, cardinalfish, dottybacks, wrasses and cichilds, by ichthyologists as these were thought to be closely related.
