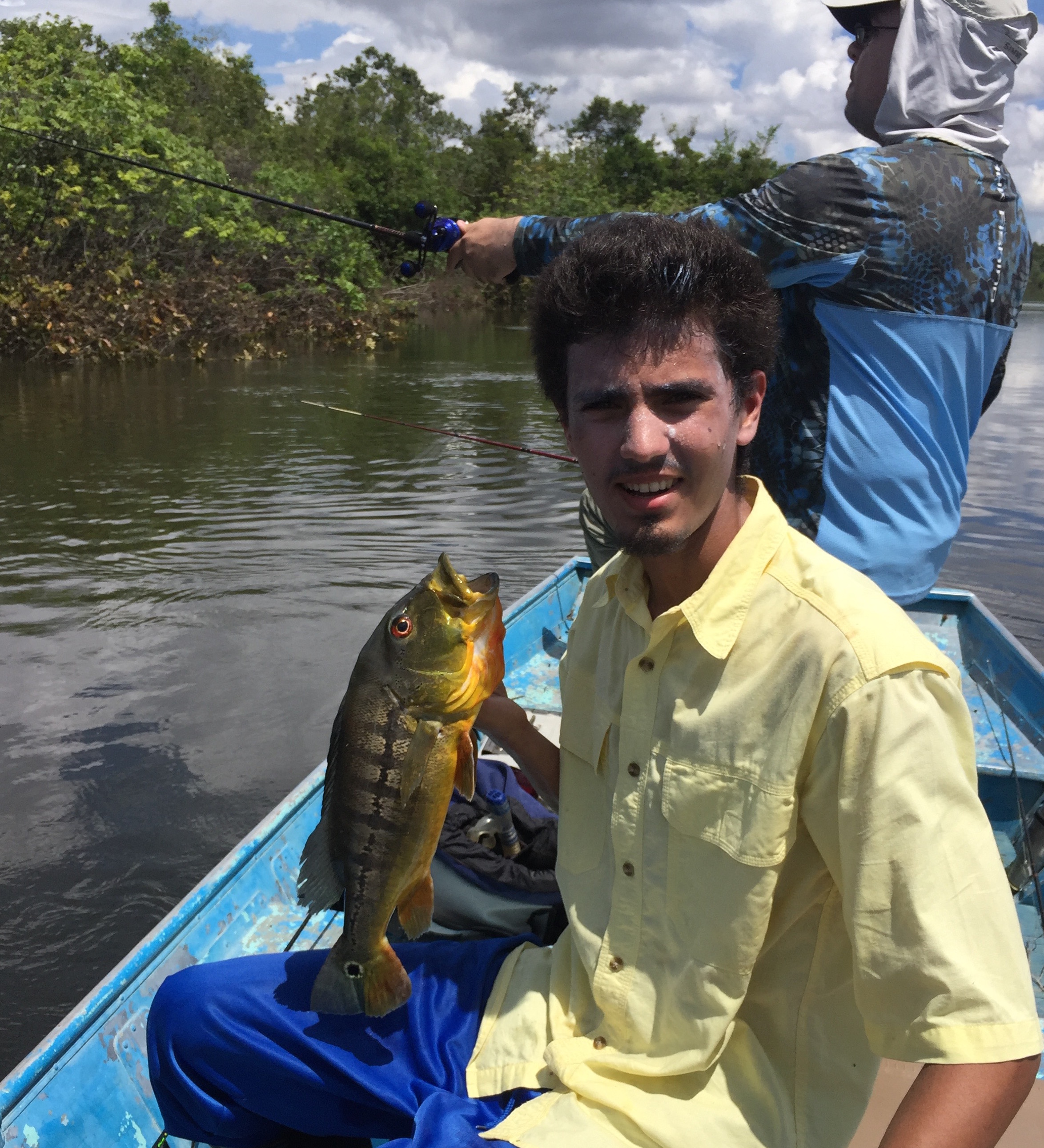
- Caught in Cinaruco River, Apure, Venezuela

Conservation status
- Least Concern (IUCN 3.1)

Scientific classification
- Kingdom: Animalia
- Phylum: Chordata
- Class: Actinopterygii
- Order: Cichliformes
- Family: Cichlidae
- Genus: Cichla
- Species: C. intermedia

Binomial name
- Cichla intermedia Machado-Allison, 1971

= Cichla intermedia =

Royal peacock bass

Species of fish

Cichla intermedia, the royal peacock bass, is a large species of cichlid found in the Orinoco River basin in Venezuela and Colombia.

== Description ==
C. intermedia reaches up to 55 cm (1.8 ft) in total length and 3.0 kg (6.6 lb) in weight. It is easily identified from other species of peacock bass, as it is the only that present a series of 8 to 9 spots running through their lateral line.

== Habitat ==
Royal peacock bass inhabit both clear- and blackwater rivers from the Orinoco River basin.

== Behavior ==
These fish are predatory and feed mostly on smaller fish.
