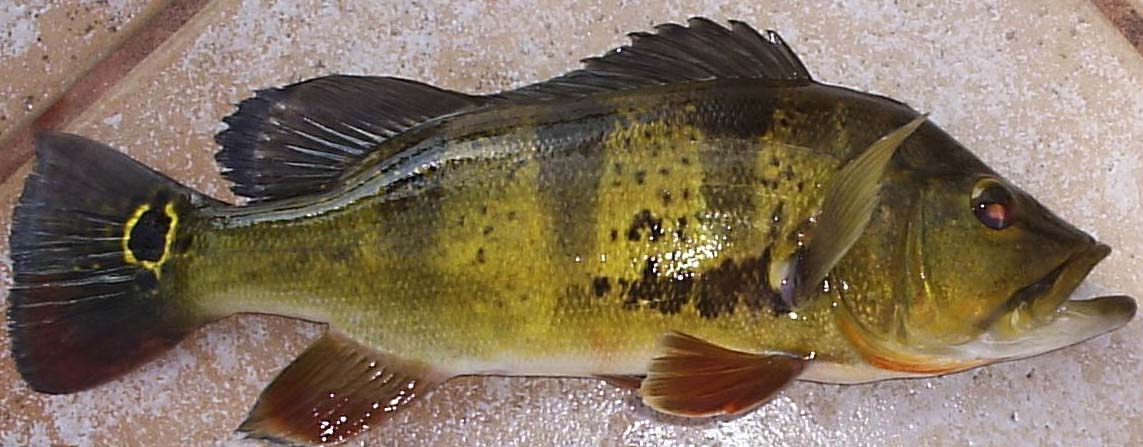

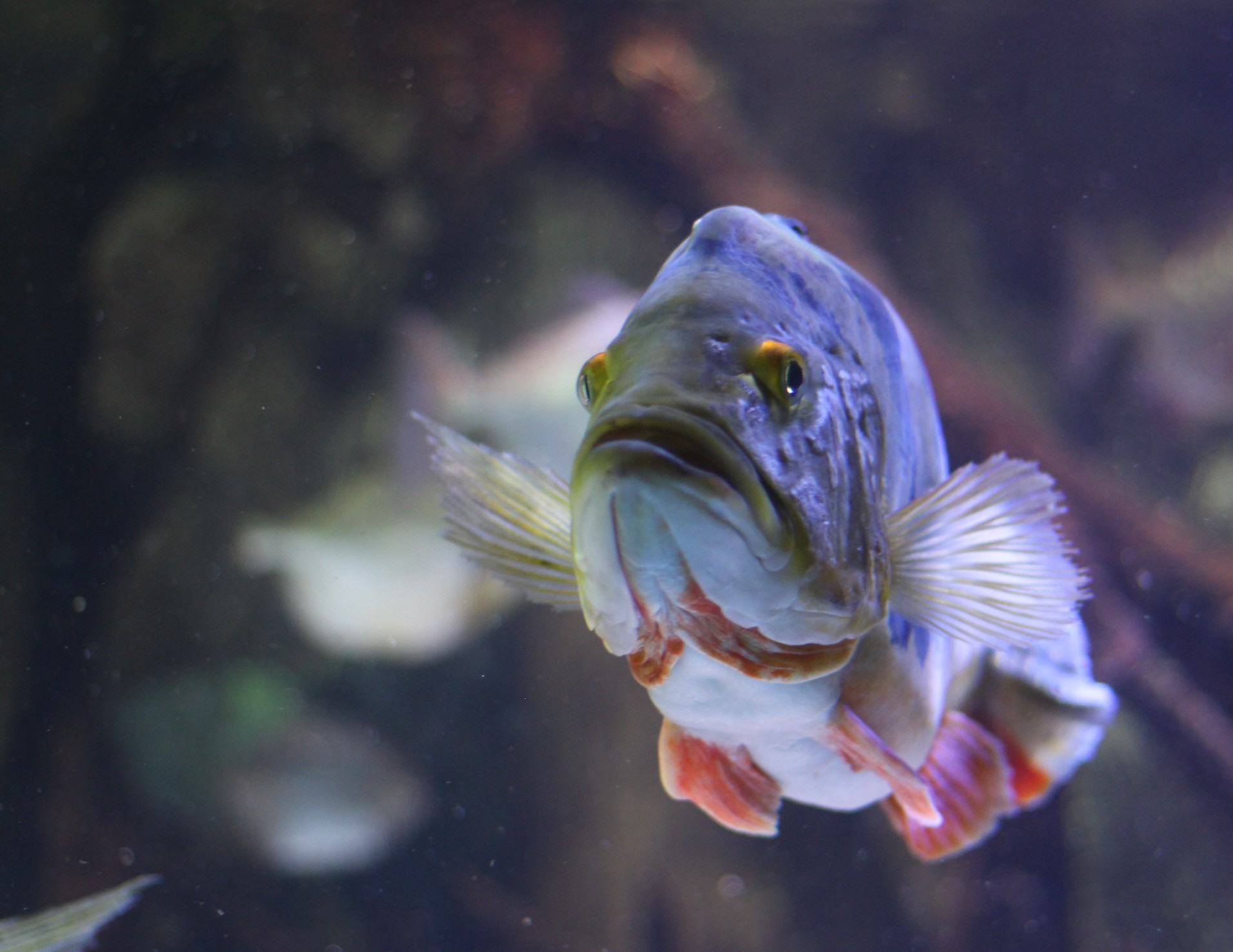

Conservation status
- Least Concern (IUCN 3.1)

Scientific classification
- Kingdom: Animalia
- Phylum: Chordata
- Class: Actinopterygii
- Order: Cichliformes
- Family: Cichlidae
- Genus: Cichla
- Species: C. monoculus

Binomial name
- Cichla monoculus Agassiz, 1831

= Cichla monoculus =

Species of fish

Cichla monoculus, sometimes known as the tucanare peacock bass ("peacock bass" is also used for some of its relatives) or toukounaré, is a very large species of cichlid, and a prized game fish. It is native to the Amazon basin in South America, but has also been introduced to regions outside its natural range (e.g., Florida and Hawaii). It reaches 80 cm (31 in) in length and 9 kg (20 lb) in weight.
