= Game fish =

Popular fish targeted in recreational fishing

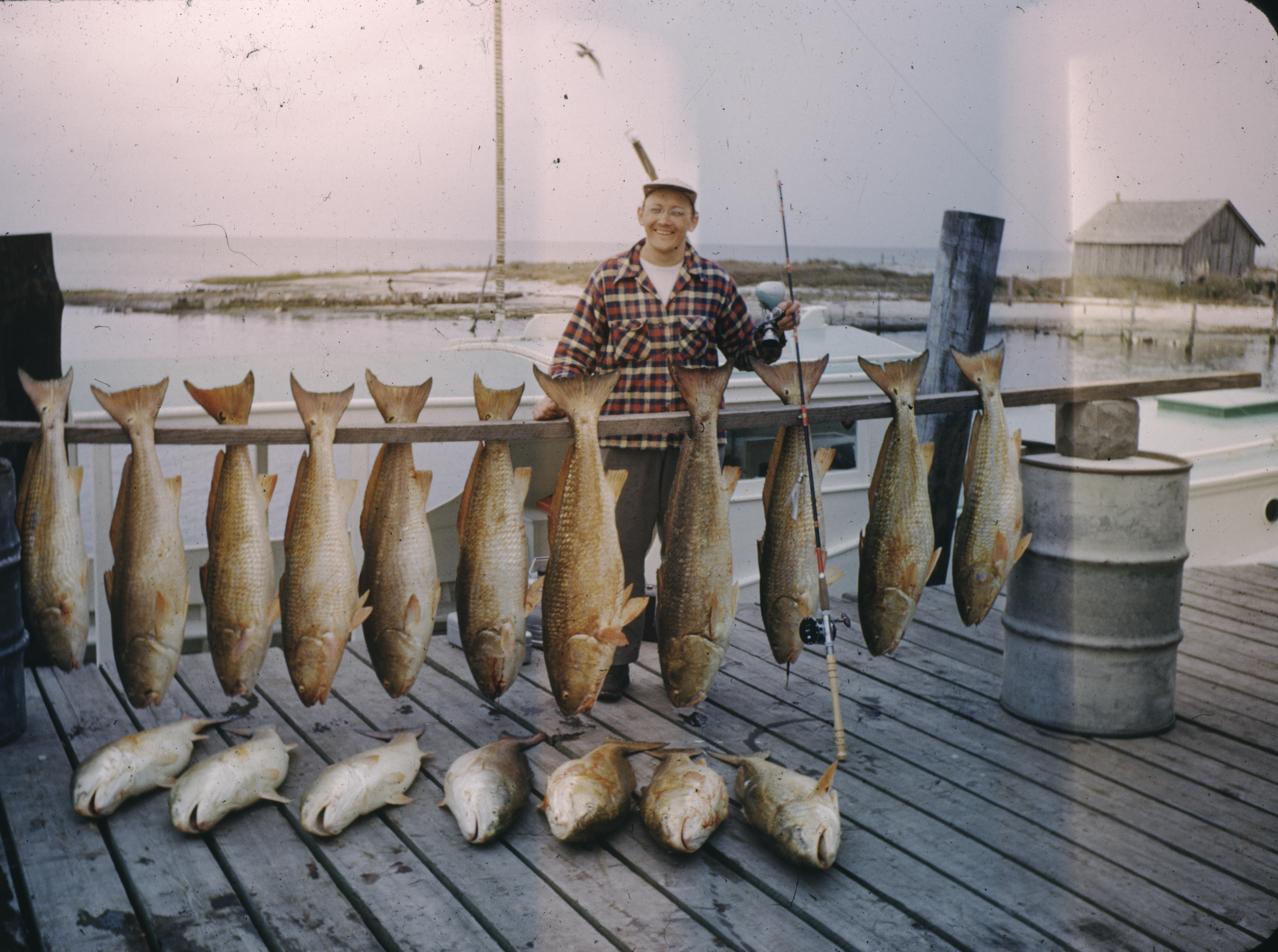
Big-game saltwater fish caught off of Cape Hatteras in 1949

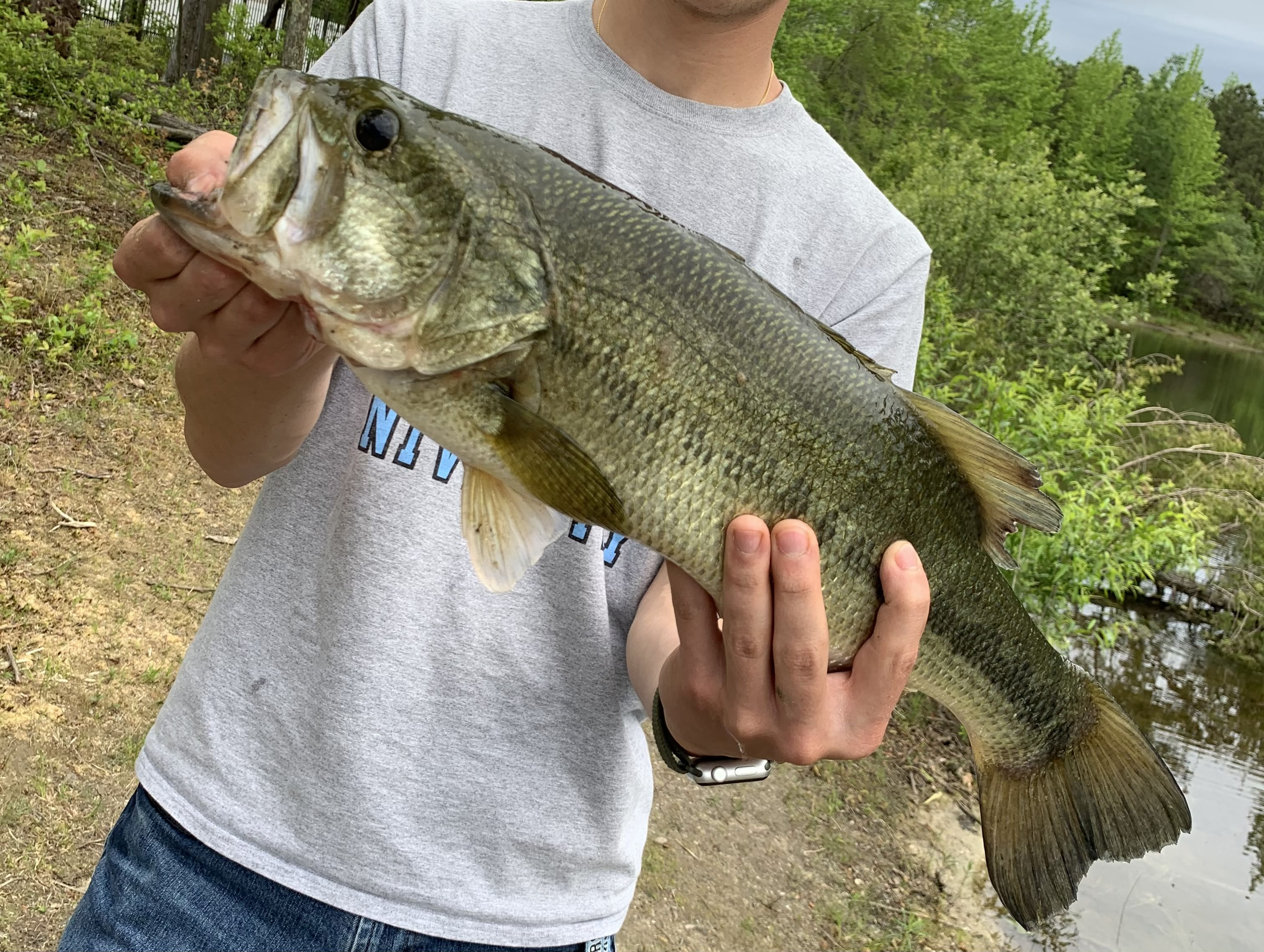
Largemouth bass is one of the most popular game fish in North America

Game fish, sport fish or quarry refer to popular fish species pursued by recreational fishers (typically anglers), and can be freshwater or saltwater fish. Game fish can be eaten after being caught, preserved as taxidermy (though rare), or released after capture. Some game fish are also targeted commercially, particularly less bony species such as salmon and tuna.

Specimens of game fish whose measurements (body length and weight) significantly exceed the species' average are sometimes known as trophy fish, as such captures are often presented as bragging rights among fishers.

== Examples ==
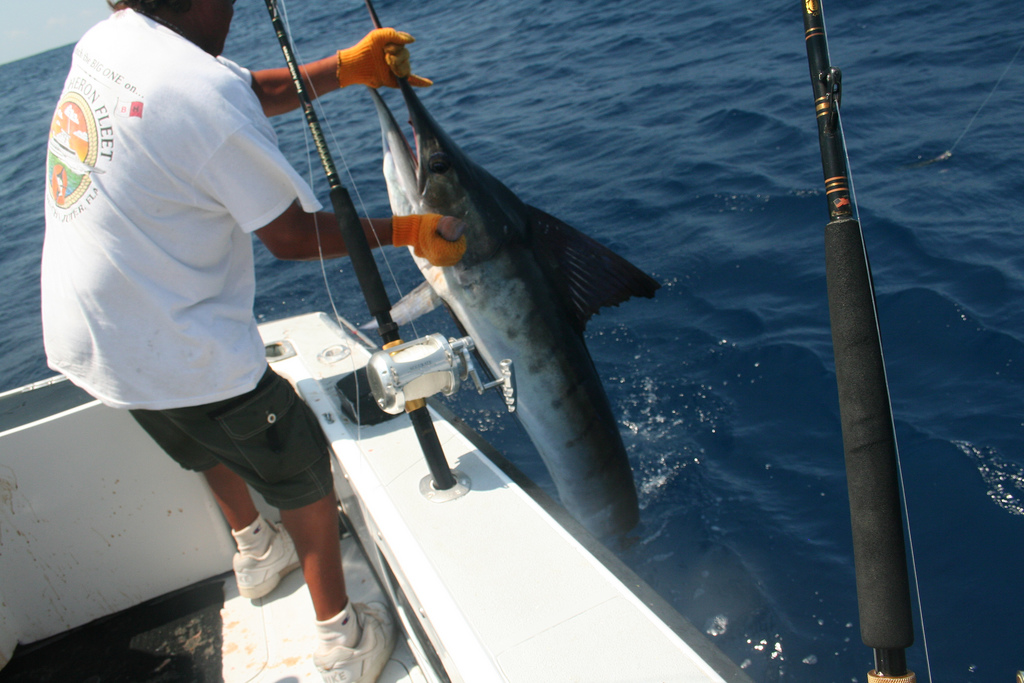
Marlins are popular blue-water game fish

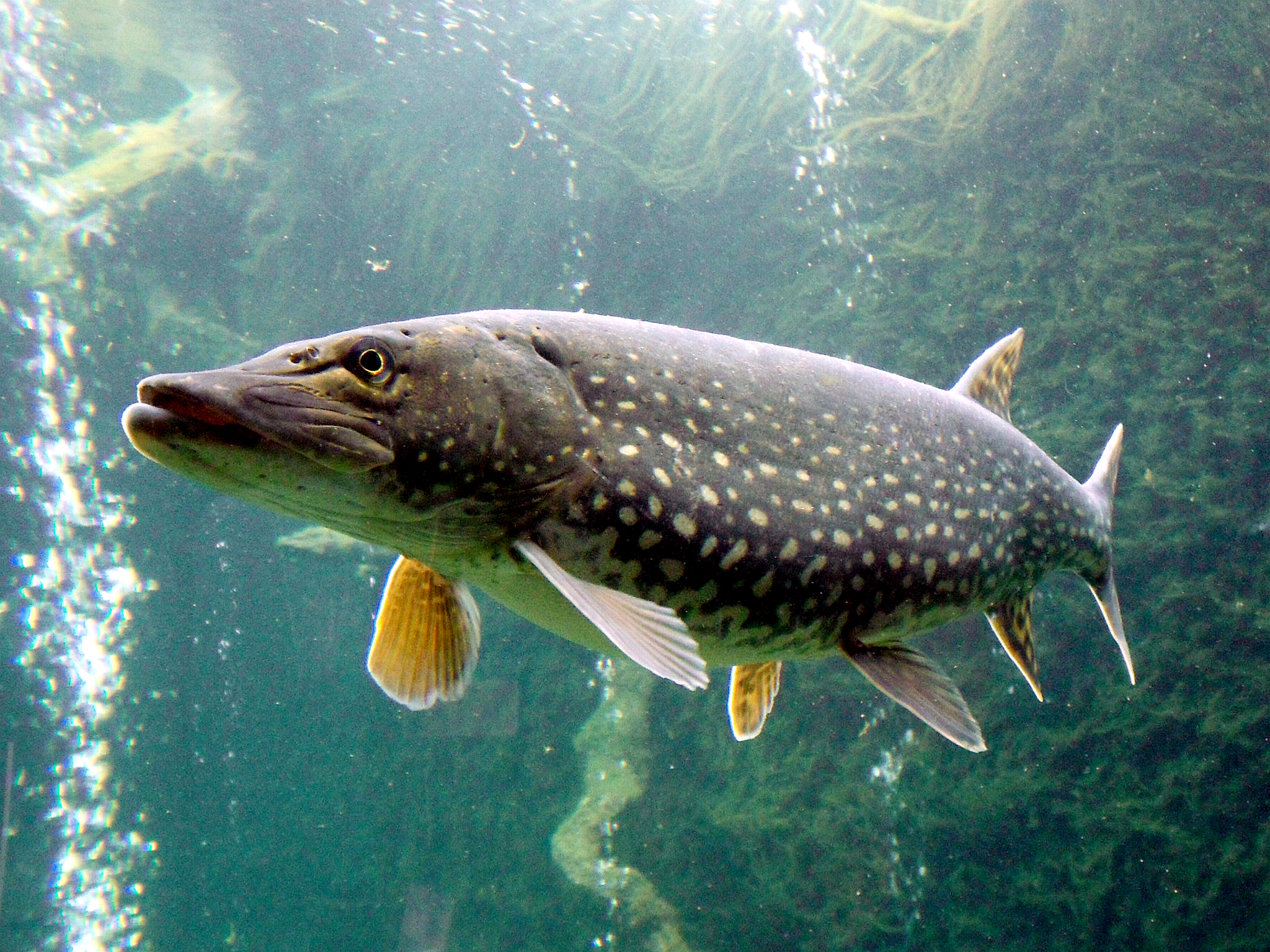
The pike is a classic freshwater game fish

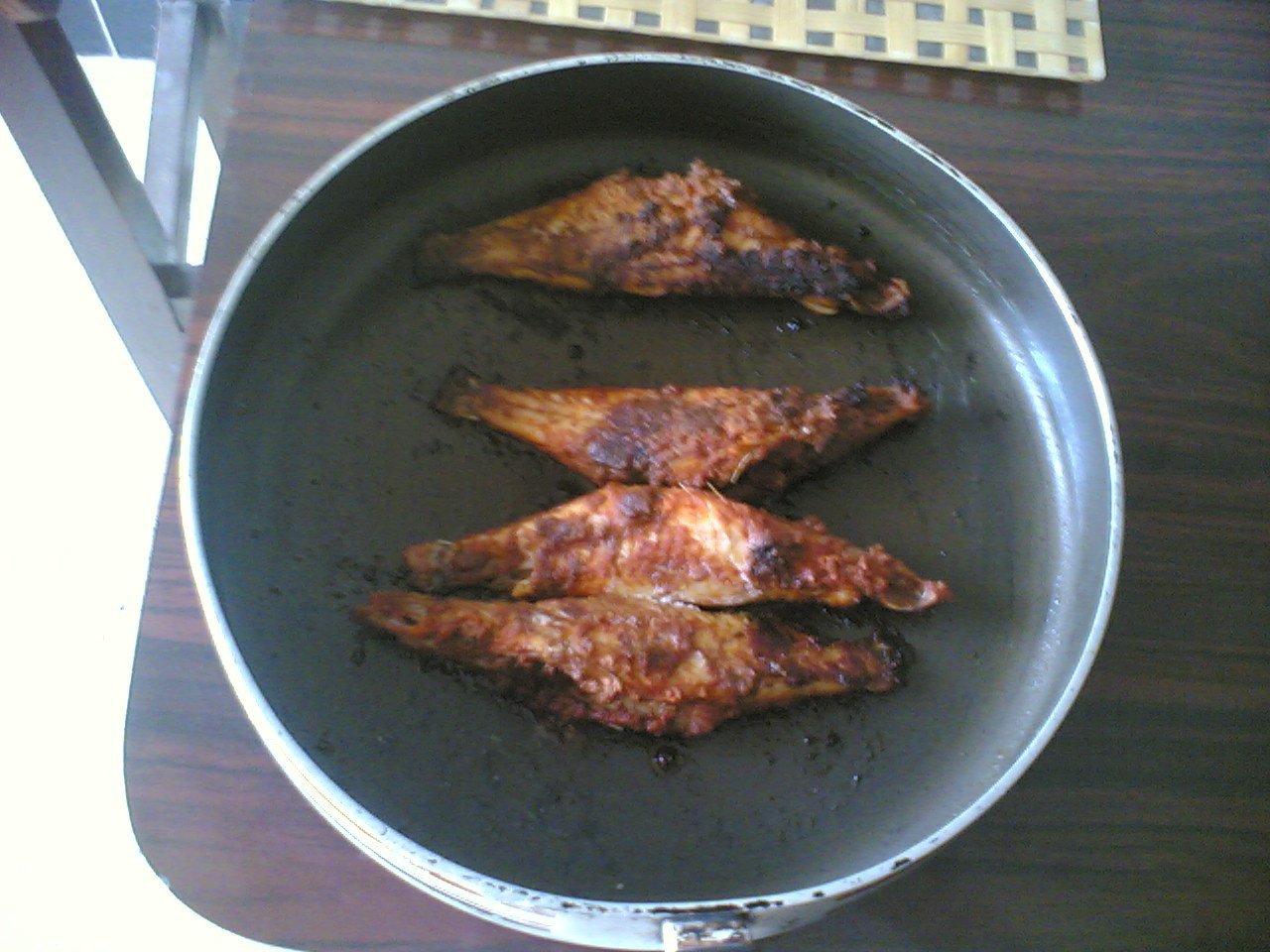
Cooking panfish

The species of fish prized by anglers varies with geography and tradition. Some fish are sought for their value as food, while others are pursued for their fighting abilities, or for the difficulty of successfully enticing the fish to bite the hook.

- Big-game fish or blue water game fish are large pelagic saltwater fish such as tuna, tarpon, grouper and billfish (sailfish, marlin and swordfish). Occasionally other predatory fishes such as sharks, barracuda and dolphinfish are also pursued. Large powerful freshwater fish such as alligator gar, lake sturgeon and flathead catfish can also be considered big-game fish.
- Freshwater fish targeted by anglers in North America include bass (especially black bass), salmon/trout, char, walleye/sauger, common snook, redfish, northern pike and muskellunge, sturgeon, gar and several catfish species. In Europe and Asia, large cyprinids (e.g. carps, barbels, breams, chubs, daces and tench), perches, freshwater salmonids (trout, graylings, whitefish and taimen), drum, pikes, catfish, eels and snakeheads are also popular, although many of them are regarded derogatorily as "trash fish", "dirt fish" or "pest fish" in America.
  - In the United Kingdom, "game fish" refers specifically to salmonids other than graylings – that is, salmon, trout and char. Other popular freshwater fish are called coarse fish.
- Small/medium-sized freshwater fish routinely sought by anglers are called panfish in the United States, because they typically can fit wholly into a normal cooking pan without needing to be cut or filleted. Examples are crappies, yellow perch, rock bass, bluegills and other sunfish (Centrarchidae). Panfish are often sought by younger, more inexperienced anglers, at least partly due to their proactivity to feed and the relative ease to be caught; although adult anglers sometimes consider them as "nuisance fish" due to their tendency to opportunistically strike the baits/lures intended for other larger fishes.

Some popular game fish have been introduced and stocked worldwide. Rainbow trout, for instance, can be found nearly anywhere the climate is appropriate, from their native range on the Pacific Coast of North America to the mountains of southern Africa, and is now listed as one of the worst invasive species.

== Game-fish tagging programs ==
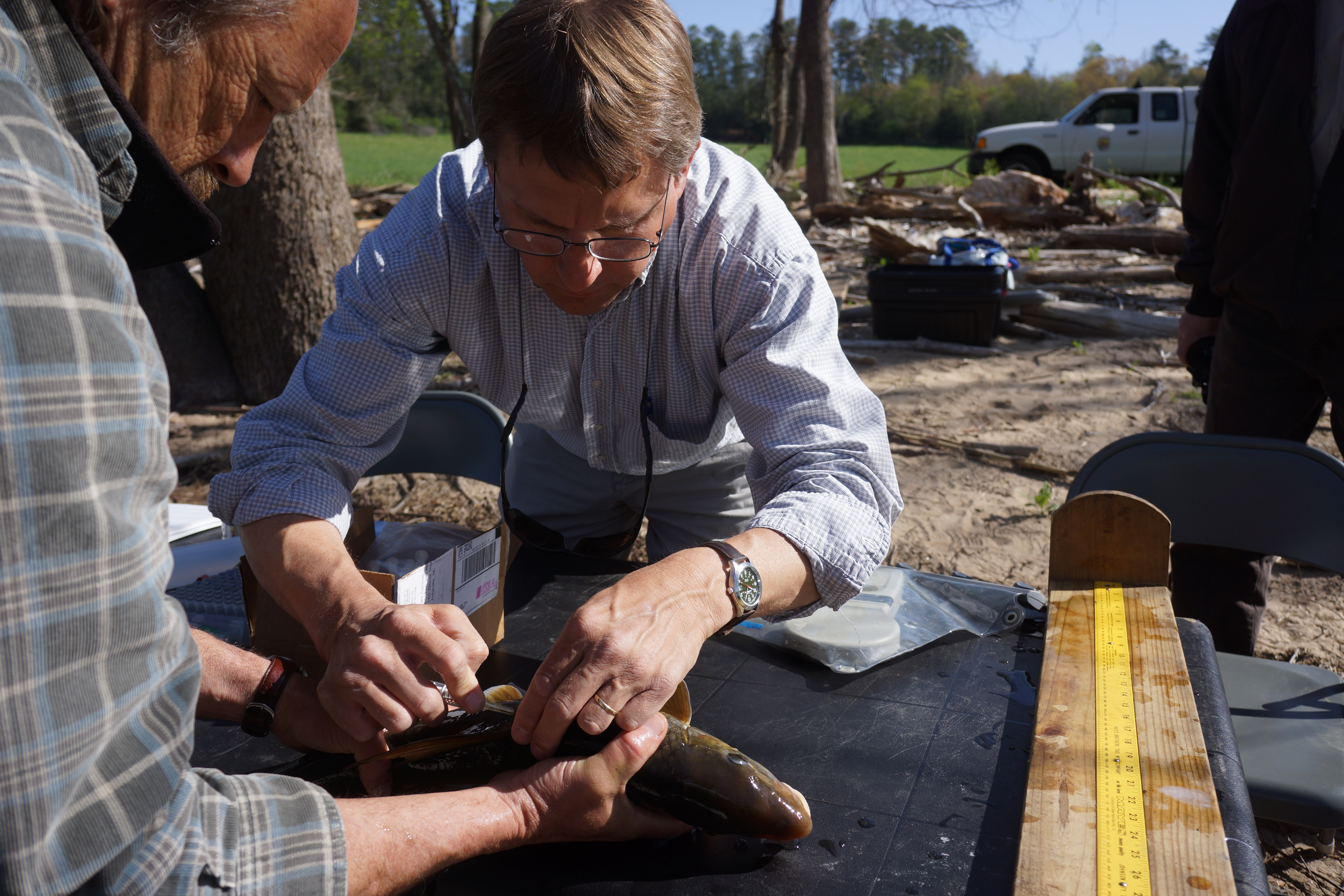
Biologists in North Carolina injecting a sicklefin redhorse with an identifying tag

As part of the catch-and-release practice encouraged to promote conservation, tagging programs were established. Some of their goals are to improve the management of fishery resources and to keep records on abundance, age, growth rates, migrations and breed identification.

Some well-known tagging programs in the United States are the South Carolina Marine Game Fish Tagging Program and the Virginia Game Fish Tagging Program. The South Carolina Marine Game Fish Tagging Program began in 1974 and it is now the largest public tagging program in the Southeastern United States. Anglers are trained and then receive a tag kit with tags, applicator, and instructions. When they tag a fish, anglers use a reply postcard they receive in advance to send the information on the tag number, tag date, location, species, and size. This program issues anglers who tag and release 30 or more eligible species within a year a conservation award. When an angler recaptures a tagged fish, they then should report the recapture. If possible, the tag number and the mailing address should be reported, along with the location and date of the recapture, as well with the measurement of the fish. The objective is to provide biologists with the necessary information to determine growth rate through an accurate measurement. The Virginia Game Fish Tagging Program started operations in 1995 and keeps records on recaptured fish since then. This is an annual program that starts in January and it is limited to 160 anglers. Anglers receive training workshops in February and March.

== Records ==
The official guide to world salt- and freshwater fish records is the World Record Game Fishes, published annually by the International Game Fish Association (IGFA), which maintains records for nearly 400 species around the world. The records are categorised, with separate records for juniors, for the type of tackle and line used, for fly fishing, and locality records. The IGFA also organize the world saltwater championship tournaments.

== See also ==
- Coarse fishing – Type of freshwater angling in the United Kingdom and Ireland
- Fishing tournament – Fishing contest among a group of anglers
- Game (hunting) – Wild animals under pursuit or taken in hunting
- List of freshwater game fish
- List of marine game fish
- Overfishing – Removal of a species of fish from water at a rate that the species cannot replenish
- Recreational fishing – Fishing as a hobby

== Sources ==
- Dunn, Bob (2000) Saltwater Game Fishes of the World. Australian Fishing Network.ISBN 978-1-86513-010-1
