= Glyptothorax kurdistanicus =

Conservation status
- Data Deficient (IUCN 3.1)

Scientific classification
- Kingdom: Animalia
- Phylum: Chordata
- Class: Actinopterygii
- Division: Teleostei
- Order: Siluriformes
- Family: Sisoridae
- Genus: Glyptothorax
- Species: G. kurdistanicus

Binomial name
- Glyptothorax kurdistanicus (Berg, 1931)

Synonyms
- Glyptosternum kurdistanicum Berg, 1931

Species of fish

Glyptothorax kurdistanicus also known as Kurdistan catfish is a species of sisorid catfish. It is known by several common names, including Mesopotamian sucker catfish, Kordestan catfish and Iran cat. This grey or brown fish with black spots is best known from the Little Zab in Iran and Iraq. It is poorly studied; the full extent of its range is not known and the taxonomic relationships between members of its genus are uncertain.

== Description ==
Glyptothorax kurdistanicus is a grey-to-brown catfish with round black spots on its sides, and a black central band to its fins. Like the other species in Glyptothorax, it possesses a thoracic adhesive apparatus or 'sucker' that allows it to attach itself to rocks or other objects in the stream bed. Adult specimens can reach 27 centimetres (11 in) in length.

== Taxonomy and phylogeny ==
Lev Berg first described this species in a 1931 paper based on a specimen collected in July, 1914. He placed it in the genus Glyptosternum, but this was later determined to be an unjustified emendation of the existing genus Glyptosternon, leading to its reassignment to Glyptothorax. The holotype of Glyptothorax kurdistanicus is currently held by the Zoological Institute in Saint Petersburg.

The specific epithet is derived from the Kurdistan region. Common names for G. kurdistanicus include "Kordestan catfish", "Mesopotamian sucker catfish", and "Iran cat".

=== Related species ===
Several other species of Glyptothorax have been named from the Tigris–Euphrates river system. G. kurdistanicus is distinguished from G. armeniacus and G. silviae by the shape of its adhesive apparatus; G. silviae also lacks tubercles on its head and body. Two other species have also been described from Iraqi waters, G. cous and G. steindachneri. The distinctions between the species are often unclear, and the International Union for Conservation of Nature (IUCN) considers the taxonomy of Glyptothorax in the Tigris-Euphrates to be "completely unresolved".

== Distribution, habitat, and ecology ==
Glyptothorax kurdistanicus is best known from the Little Zab, and may be endemic to it. Some surveys have reported its presence in other waters. It may be present in the Great Zab to the north, and a number of rivers to the east, including the Dez, Karun, and Karkheh. One immature male fish identified as G. kurdistanicus in 2009 was collected from the Garaf River, a distributary of the Tigris south of Baghdad. However, the IUCN considered the identification of many of these specimens to be "speculations".

A rheophilic predator, G. kurdistanicus feeds on aquatic invertebrates and small fish in fast-moving rivers.

== Conservation ==
Uncertainties in the range and taxonomy of Glyptothorax kurdistanicus prevent the IUCN from assessing its conservation status. As of 2014, it is considered data deficient, although the damming of rivers in the region may ultimately qualify this or related species for threatened status.

== Bibliography ==
- Firouz, Eskandar (2005). The Complete Fauna of Iran. I.B. Taurus. ISBN 978-1-85043-946-2.
- Smith, Kevin G.; Barrios, Violeta; Darwall, William R.T.; Numa, Catherine, eds. (2014). The Status and Distribution of Freshwater Biodiversity in the Eastern Mediterranean. IUCN. ISBN 978-2-8317-1699-2.
