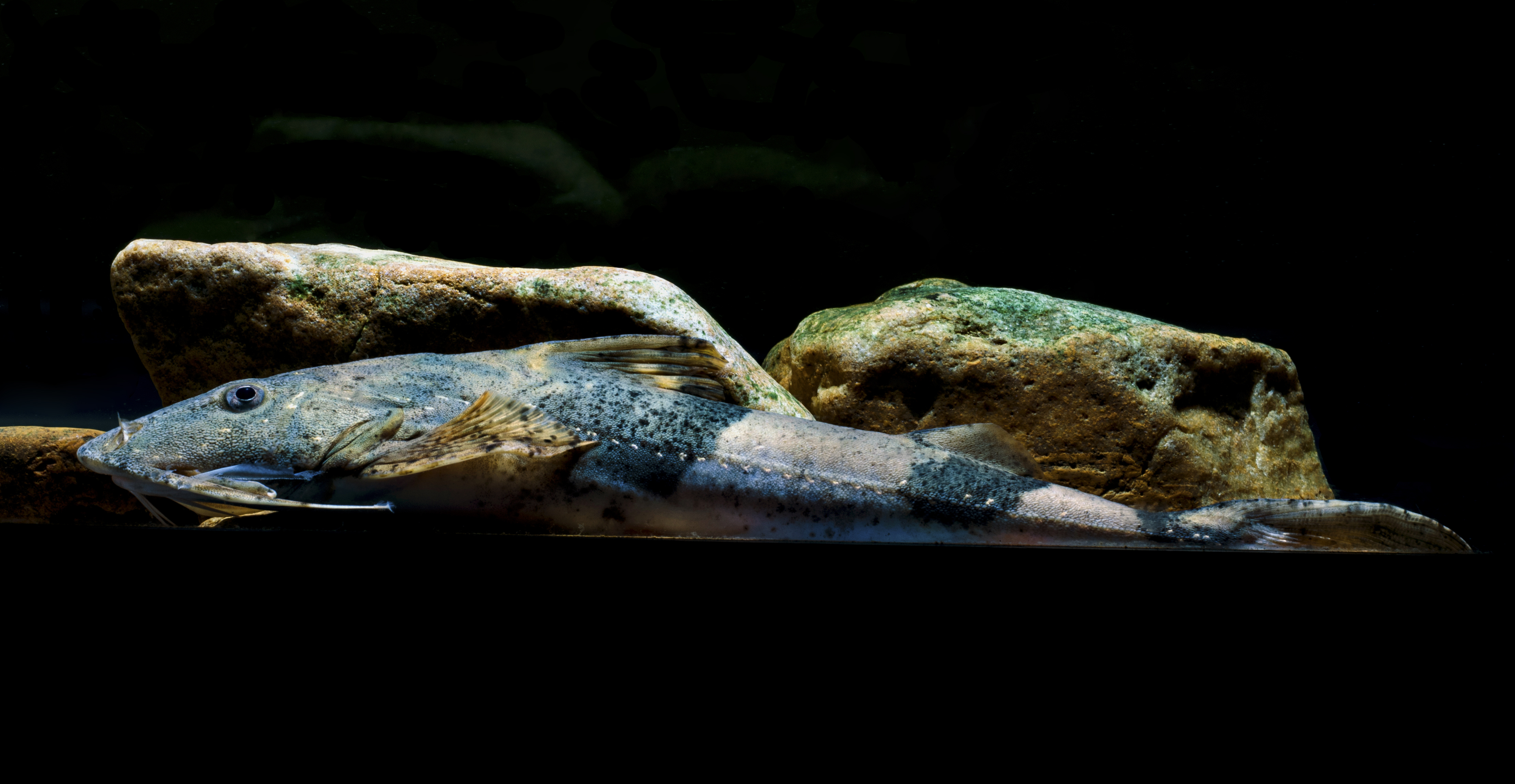
- Bagarius rutilus

Scientific classification
- Kingdom: Animalia
- Phylum: Chordata
- Class: Actinopterygii
- Division: Teleostei
- Order: Siluriformes
- Family: Sisoridae
- Subfamily: Sisorinae
- Genus: Bagarius; Bleeker, 1854

Type species
- Bagarius bagarius Hamilton, 1822

= Bagarius =

Bagarius Temporal range: Pliocene - Recent

Genus of fishes

Bagarius (Thai: ปลาแค้) is an Asian genus of catfishes (order Siluriformes) of the family Sisoridae.

== Description ==
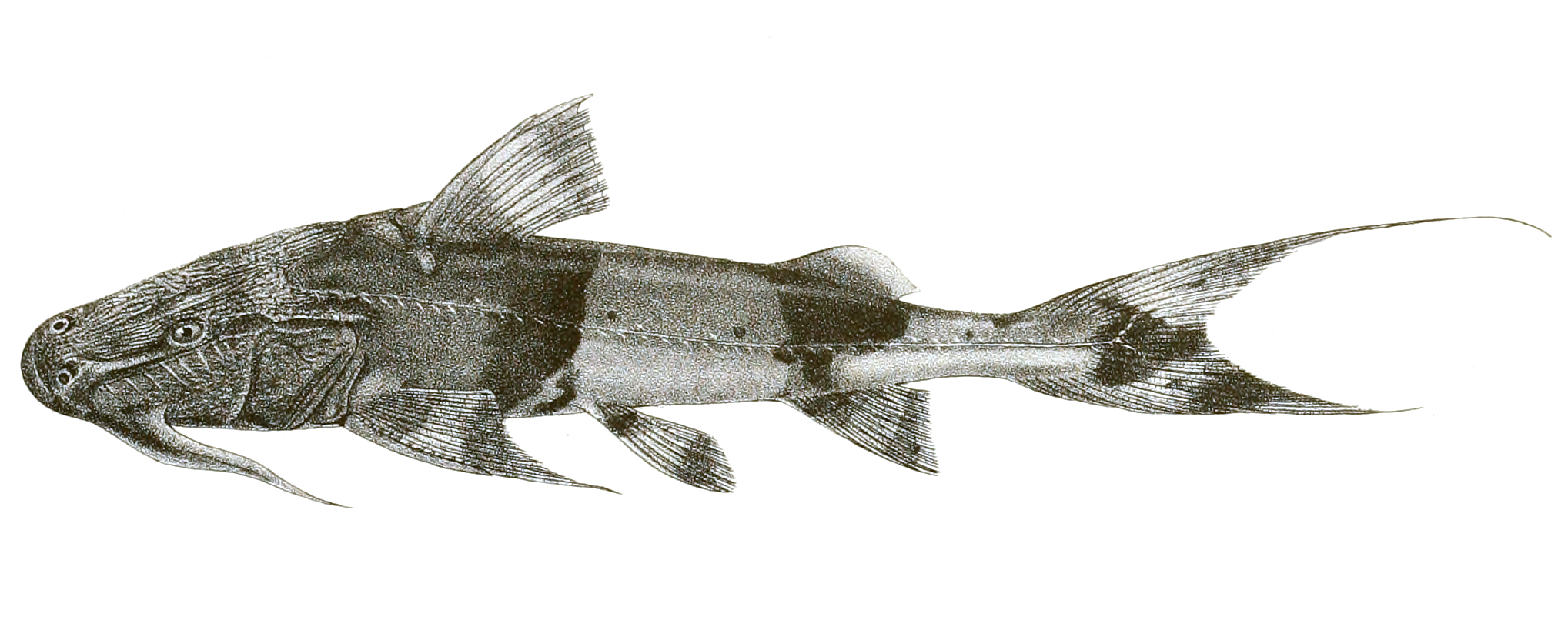
Illustration by Henry Sullivan Thomas of the Bagarius Yarrellii

Bagarius species have a broad head that is moderately or strongly depressed or flattened. The mouth is broad and terminal or slightly inferior. The gill openings are wide. The dorsal fin and pectoral fins have strong spines. The dorsal fin spine is smooth, and the pectoral fin spine is smooth anteriorly and finely serrate posteriorly. The dorsal, pectoral, and caudal fin lobes sometimes with filamentous extensions. The head and body is entirely or almost entirely covered by heavily keratinized skin superficially differentiated into unculiferous plaques or tubercles. Bagarius species lack the thoracic adhesive apparatus of other sisorids and paired fins are unplaited.

Bagarius species have the same general colour pattern consisting of three darkly pigmented bands or blotches on the body. Irregularly placed spots may also be present on the body. The fin pigmentation varies from species to species, from plain, to spotted, to slightly or heavily barred. Also, some B. yarelli may have a heavily spotted pattern like a Dalmatian dog that obscures the main barred pattern.

In B. bagarius, the pelvic fin origin is normally anterior to a vertical line through the base of the last dorsal fin ray, while in B. yarelli the pelvic fin origin is posterior to this vertical line. Also, in most B. bagarius, the adipose fin originates far back over the anal fin, on a vertical through the base of the third or four anal fin ray. However, in most B. yarelli, the adipose fin originates near or in front of a vertical line through the anal fin origin. In B. suchus, the adipose fin originates even further back than in B. bagarius or B. yarelli. B. suchus tends to have a flatter head and body than either B. bagarius or B. yarelli.

B. bagarius does not grow much past 20 centimetres (7.9 in) SL. B. rutilus grows to about 100 cm (39.4 in) SL. B. suchus grows to about 70 cm (27.6 in) SL. Both B. yarelli and B. lica grow very large, reaching about 200 cm (78.7 in) SL.

== Species ==
Seven extant species are currently recognized in Bagarius:

- Bagarius bagarius (Hamilton, 1822) (Goonch)
- Bagarius dolichonema Zeng & Chen, 2025
- Bagarius lica Volz, 1903
- Bagarius protos Zeng & Chen, 2025
- Bagarius rutilus Ng & Kottelat, 2000
- Bagarius suchus Roberts, 1983 (crocodile catfish)
- Bagarius vegrandis Ng & Kottelat, 2021 (dwarf goonch catfish)

A 2021 study found the Bagarius yarrelli to be synonymous with B. bagarius. This has been accepted by FishBase, following ECoF.

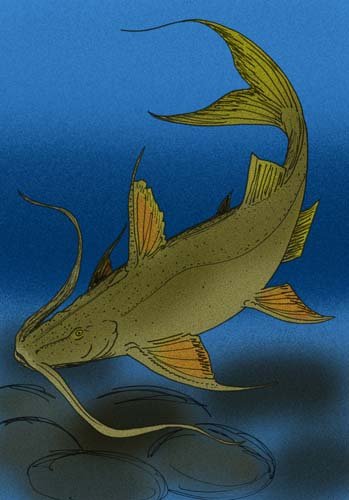
Reconstruction of the extinct species, B. gigas, from the Paleogene of Sumatra

The following cladogram is based on a 2025 analysis of COI genes using Bayesian inference and maximum likelihood methods:

- - Bagarius
    - Bagarius protos
    - - - Bagarius dolichonema
        - Bagarius bagarius
      - - - Bagarius lica
          - - Bagarius rutilus
            - Bagarius vegrandis
        - Bagarius suchus
  - Glyptothorax burmanicus
- Pseudecheneis immaculata

=== Fossil record ===
†Bagarius gigas is reported from Padang, Sumatra; it is known from a fragmentary pectoral arch with a near intact pectoral fin along with some other elements. The locale was dated to the Eocene but this may not be the case.

The oldest known confirmed sisorid fossil is B. bagarius found in Sumatra and India of the Pliocene.

== Distribution ==
Bagarius species inhabit south and southeast Asia. They are distributed in the Indus drainage in Pakistan and India, east (including peninsular India) to the Red River drainage in Vietnam and south throughout Indochina including the Malay Peninsula and Indonesia. B. bagarius is known from the Ganges River, Chao Phraya, and the Mekong drainages, as well as the Malay Peninsula and the Salween and Mae Klong drainages and the Brahmaputra River and Ayeyarwady River. B. suchus originates from the Mekong and Chao Phraya basins. B. rutilus inhabits the Red River and Ma River in northern Vietnam.

== Ecology ==
B. bagarius inhabits rapid and rocky pools of large and medium-sized rivers. B. suchus is usually associated with rapids in the large rivers it inhabits. B. yarelli occurs in large rivers on the bottom, even with swift current, never entering small streams. It is found among boulders, often in the white water of the rapids where it apparently is indifferent to the strong current.

B. bagarius is primarily entomophagous. It also feeds on small fishes, frogs and shrimps. B. suchus, however, is a piscivore. B. yarelli feeds primarily on prawns but also eat small fishes and aquatic insects. As predators, these catfish experience bioaccumulation, and thus can be used as bioindicators of river pollution.

B. bagarius breeds in rivers prior to the beginning of the annual flood season.

B. yarelli migrates in schools. It is reported to migrate to follow its prey. It is also reported that it follows Catlocarpio siamensis during its upstream migration. Apparently the main upstream migration begins close to the peak of flood, when the current is very strong and the water is turbid.

== Relationship to humans ==
Bagarius species are marketed fresh, and are important as a food fish, but the meat spoils rapidly and can cause illness. The goonch catfish B. yarrelli has become an object of media attention as reports have surfaced of some of these fish feeding on funeral pyres in the Kali River. There is speculation that some drownings have also been caused by large specimens that have "developed a taste" for human flesh from the corpses and subsequently have attacked bathers in the river. This is the subject of a TV documentary aired on 22 October 2008, as well as an episode about the Kali River goonch attacks on the Animal Planet series River Monsters.
