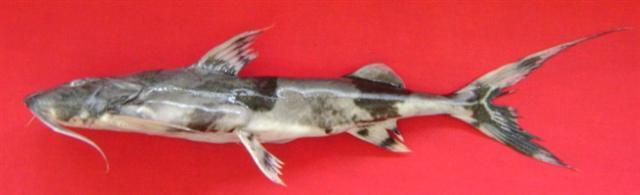

Conservation status
- Vulnerable (IUCN 3.1)

Scientific classification
- Kingdom: Animalia
- Phylum: Chordata
- Class: Actinopterygii
- Order: Siluriformes
- Family: Sisoridae
- Genus: Bagarius
- Species: B. bagarius

Binomial name
- Bagarius bagarius (Hamilton, 1822)

Synonyms
- Pimelodus bagarius Hamilton, 1822

= Bagarius bagarius =

Species of fish

Bagarius bagarius, also known as the giant devil catfish or goonch (Assamese: গৰুৱা gorua, Bengali: বাঘাইর), is a species of catfish in the genus Bagarius. It is generally reported as being found in large and medium rivers in South Asia, and is likely synonymous with B. yarrelli.

== Taxonomy ==
Prior to 2021, the standard was to recognize two species of Bagarius from the Indian subcontinent: First B. bagarius, supposedly a small species (up to 20 cm or 7.9 in) first described in 1822 by Francis Buchanan-Hamilton based on a specimen from the Ganges River. The second is B. yarrelli, supposedly a very large species (up to 2 m or 6.6 ft) first described in 1839 by William Henry Sykes based on a specimen from the Mula-Mutha River. Recent studies have not been able to document that more than one species exists in the Indian subcontinent, which, if confirmed, would mean that the name B. bagarius is a senior synonym of B. yarrelli, which was confirmed by a 2021 study. In contrast, Southeast Asian populations from the Mekong and Chao Phraya basins typically included in B. bagarius likely represent a separate species, which a 2021 study found to be the new species B. vegrandis.

The larger type has been accused of several fatal attacks on humans in the Mahakali River that is Nepal's western border with India.
