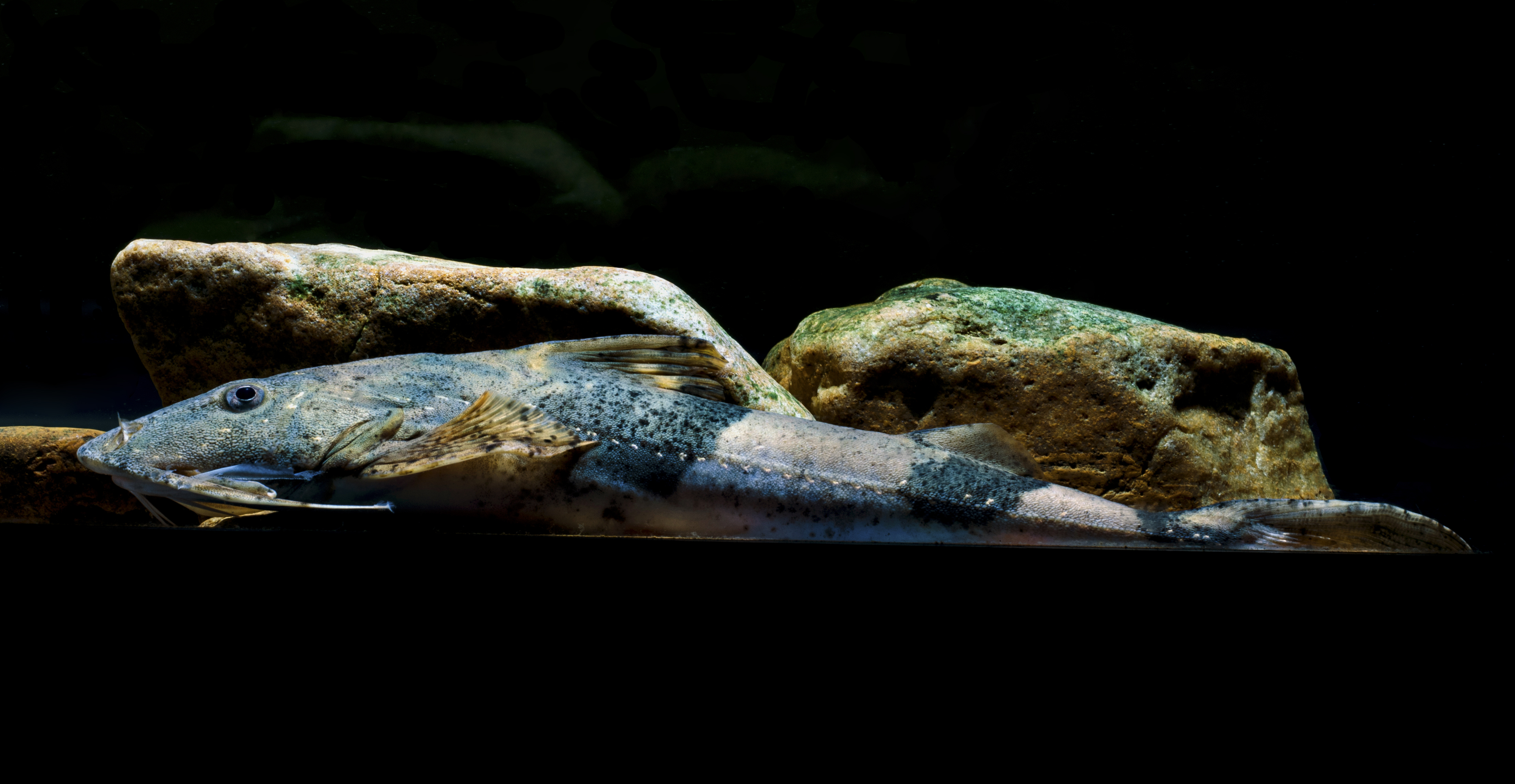

Conservation status
- Data Deficient (IUCN 3.1)

Scientific classification
- Domain: Eukaryota
- Kingdom: Animalia
- Phylum: Chordata
- Class: Actinopterygii
- Order: Siluriformes
- Family: Sisoridae
- Genus: Bagarius
- Species: B. rutilus

Binomial name
- Bagarius rutilus Ng & Kottelat, 2000

= Bagarius rutilus =

Species of fish

Bagarius rutilus is a species of sisorid catfish native to Laos, Vietnam and Yunnan in China where it is found in the Nam Sam, Nam Ma and Red River basins. This species grows to a length of 100 centimetres (39 in) SL.

== Description ==
Small fish over 15 cm eat aquatic larvae and insects including mayflies, caddisflies, hemiptera, beetles, odonata, shrimp and juvenile fish while mature fish eat other fish. It congregates where there are other fish especially fish breeding grounds. This species breeds from March or June or later and they migrate to upper and middle parts of rivers and streams. Eggs are laid in stone niches and are rather large with measures 1.1 mm to 1.4 mm.

== Threats and status ==
It is threatened by overfishing and habitat loss such as dam construction; for example the species may have been affected by the construction of Trung Sơn Dam. The species is thought to have declined 20% in many areas because of dam construction for irrigation and hydroelectricity but further studies are needed. It is caught by fisheries and is of high economic value. Severe fishing exploitation happens from December to May in high production places such Red River. It is considered Vulnerable in Vietnam and IUCN says although this species could actually be Near Threatened, it is listed as Data Deficient due to lack of information.
