= Icon Films =

British television production company

- Company type: Independent
- Industry: TV Production
- Founded: Bristol, 1990
- Headquarters: Bristol, UK
- Key people: Harry Marshall; Laura Marshall; Andie Clare; Lucy Middleboe
- Website: iconfilms.co.uk

Icon Films is a British independent television production company that produces factual programmes for broadcast by networks both in the UK and US. The company was founded in 1990 by Harry Marshall and Laura Marshall, and is based in Bristol.

== Current and past productions ==
Programme	Channel	Year Completed	Notes
Hippos (WT)	BBC Two	In Production	
Okavango	Nippon Hoso Kyokai (NHK)	In Production	
Malawi Wildlife Rescue	Love Nature	In Production	
Jeremy Wade's Mighty Rivers	Animal Planet, ITV	2018	Presented by Jeremy Wade
Animal Airport	More4	2018	
Passions: Judy Garland by Marc Almond	Sky Arts	2018	
Legend Hunter	Travel Channel	2018	Presented by Pat Spain
The Flood	Nat Geo WILD	2018	Narrated by Angela Bassett
Africa's Wild Side	Nat Geo WILD	2018	
St. Peter’s Hospice Room to Care Appeal	St. Peter's Hospice (Digital)	2017	
Savage Kingdom: Uprising (Season 2)	Nat Geo WILD	2017	Narrated by Charles Dance
Primal Survivor	National Geographic Channel	2017	Presented by Hazen Audel
The Lost Kingdom of the Yeti	Animal Planet	2017	
Devon Cream Company	Devon Cream Company	2017	
Philip Larkin by Andrew Motion	Sky Arts	2017	
Elephant: King of the Kalahari	Nat Geo WILD	2017	
Great Hammerhead Invasion	Discovery Channel	2017	
Battle for the Pride	Nat Geo WILD	2017	
Man Eating Python	Discovery Channel	2017	
River Monsters Season 9	Animal Planet, ITV	2017	Presented by Jeremy Wade
Young Blood	Nat Geo WILD	2017	
Restless Leg Syndrome: Desperate for Help	Channel 5	2016	
Clash of Africa's Giants	Animal Planet	2016	
Andrew Marr: My Brain & Me	BBC Two	2016	
Yeti or Not?	Animal Planet	2016	
Savage Kingdom Season 1	Nat Geo WILD	2016	Narrated by Charles Dance
River Monsters Season 8	Animal Planet US	2016	Presented by Jeremy Wade
Million Pound Mega Yachts	Channel 4	2015	
England's Vampires	Channel 4	2015	
Vampire Legend	PBS Secrets of the Dead	2015	
The One Show Series 9	BBC	2015	
Return of the Giant Killers – Africa's Lion King	BBC, Animal Planet	2015	
Primal Survivor	National Geographic Channels	2015	
River Monsters Prehistoric Terrors	Animal Planet US, Discovery Canada	2015	Presented by Jeremy Wade
River Monsters Season 7	Animal Planet US	2015	Presented by Jeremy Wade
Ben Franklin's Bones	PBS Secrets of the Dead	2014	
Betty White's Smartest Animals in America	Great American Country	2014	Presented by Betty White
Spawn of Jaws 2 – The Birth	Discovery Channel	2014	Presented by Michael Domeier
Survive the Tribe	National Geographic Channels	2014	Presented by Hazen Audel
Africa's Giant Killers	BBC2	2014	
River Monsters Season 6	Animal Planet US, ITV,	2014	Presented by Jeremy Wade
Animals Through the Night – Sleepover at the Zoo	BBC4	2014	Presented by Liz Bonnin
Betty White Goes Wild	National Geographic Channel	2013	Presented by Betty White
Seven Days that Made the Fuhrer	Channel 5	2013	
Bigfoot Files	Channel 4	2013	Presented by Mark Evans
Hustling America	Channel 5	2013	Presented by Alexis Conran
Animal Airport Series 2	Animal Planet UK	2013	
Spawn of Jaws	Discovery Channel	2013	Presented by Michael Domeier
Bones of the Buddha	National Geographic Channels; PBS Secrets of the Dead, Season 12, Ep. 5	2013	Presented by Charles Allen
River Monsters Season 5	Animal Planet US, ITV, ITV4	2013	Presented by Jeremy Wade
The Hunger – Death Race	Animal Planet US	2012	Presented by Guy Grieve
Animal Airport Series 1	Animal Planet UK	2012	
River Monsters Season 4	Animal Planet US, ITV1, ITV4	2012	Presented by Jeremy Wade
Wild Scene Investigation	National Geographic Channels	2012	
Million Dollar Moon Rock Heist	National Geographic Channels	2012	
Beast Tracker	Discovery Channel	2012	
Secrets of Wild India	National Geographic Channel	2011	Narrated by Sir David Attenborough
Jungle Gremlins of Java	BBC, Animal Planet	2011	
Bite of the Living Dead	Animal Planet US	2011	
Sandhurst	BBC4	2011	
Desert Seas	Nat Geo	2011	Narrated by Sir David Attenborough
Beast Hunter / Beast Man	Nat Geo	2011	Presented by Pat Spain
River Monsters Goes Tribal	Animal Planet US	2010	Presented by Jeremy Wade
World's Deadliest Towns	Animal Planet US	2010	Presented by Dave Salmoni
River Monsters Series 3	Animal Planet US, ITV1, ITV4	2010	Presented by Jeremy Wade
One Million Snake Bites	BBC, Animal Planet	2010	
River Monsters Series 2	Animal Planet US, ITV1, ITV4, ITV Global Entertainment, Discovery Channel UK	2010	Presented by Jeremy Wade
The Born Free Legacy	BBC4	2010	
Weird Creatures with Nick Baker Series 3	Animal Planet UK, Science Channel, ITV Global International	2009	Presented by Nick Baker
Airmen and the Headhunters	National Geographic Channels International, THIRTEEN and Channel 4	2009	
The One Show	BBC One	2009	
River Monsters Series 1	Animal Planet US, ITV1, ITV4, ITV Global Entertainment, Discovery Channel UK	2009	Presented by Jeremy Wade
Flesh Eating River Monster	Five	2008	Presented by Jeremy Wade
Crocodile Blues	BBC, Animal Planet, ITV Global Entertainment	2008	Presented by Romulus Whitaker
Romulus Whitaker and the Dragon Chronicles	NGCI, WNET, ITV Global Entertainment	2008	Presented by Romulus Whitaker
All About Dung	History Channel US	2008	Presented by Monty Halls
The Mountains of the Monsoon	BBC, Animal Planet	2007–2008	Presented by Sandesh Kadur
Nick Baker's Weird Creatures Series 2	Five, Animal Planet, ITV Global Entertainment	2007	Presented by Nick Baker
Travellers' Century	BBC Four	2007	Presented by Benedict Allen
Street Monkeys	NGCI, Granada International	2007	
Saving Planet Earth – Tigers	BBC	2006	Presented by Fiona Bruce
Nick Baker's Weird Creatures Series 1	Five, Animal Planet	2006	Presented by Nick Baker
Supersize Crocs	WNET, Five, Granada International, NGCI	2006	Presented by Romulus Whitaker
Tiger Kill	BBC	2006	With Simon King and Alphonse Roy
Tom Harrisson – the Barefoot Anthropologist	BBC Four	2006	Presented by Sir David Attenborough
Paranormal Pigeons	Five, Animal Planet	2005	With Rupert Sheldrake and Tim Guildford
Last Lions of India	BBC	2005	
Gangsters' Wives	Five	2005	Presented by Kate Kray
Einstein's Brain	National Geographic Channels International, Channel 4	2004	
The King Cobra and I	BBC	2004	Presented by Romulus Whitaker
Holy Cow!	DDE / PBS	2003	
Diagnosing Darwin	NCGI	2003	
White Slaves Pirate Gold	BBC	2003	
A Different Ball Game – South America	NGCI	2002	
Great Cats of India	Animal Planet / Granada	2002	
Out There: Shark Hunting	NGCI	2002	
Temple of the Tigers: India's Bandhavgarh Wilderness	DDE / PBS	2001	
Quest for the True Cross	Channel Four / Discovery / CTVC	2001	
Yeti – Hunt for the Wildman	Channel Four / Channel Four International / The Learning Channel	2001	
A Different Ball Game	NGCI	2001	
The Berkeley Estate with Chris Chapman	HTV West	2001	
Indian Journeys	BBC2 / PBS / CTVC	2000	
Journey into Amazonia	DDE / PBS	1999	
Anamalai – The Elephant Mountain	DDE / PBS	1999	
Nibha and the Elephants – Animal People	BBC	1999	
The Croc Crusader – Animal People	BBC	1999	
The Magic Keeper	Channel 4	1999	
Bhutan: The Last Shangri-La	ABC Kane / DDE / PBS	1998	
Joanna Lumley in the Kingdom of the Thunder Dragon	BBC	1997	
Vintage Morris	HTV	1997	
The Elephant Men	Channel 4 / WNET	1996	
Heart of a Nomad	Channel 4	1994	
Tibet and the End of Time	Time Life / NBC	1994	
Queen of the Elephants	Discovery	1992	

== Awards ==
Icon Films won the Grierson Award for Best Documentary Series.
