= Glyptothorax brevipinnis =

Conservation status
- Data Deficient (IUCN 3.1)

Scientific classification
- Kingdom: Animalia
- Phylum: Chordata
- Class: Actinopterygii
- Order: Siluriformes
- Family: Sisoridae
- Genus: Glyptothorax
- Species: G. brevipinnis

Binomial name
- Glyptothorax brevipinnis Hora, 1923

Species of fish

Glyptothorax brevipinnis is a species of fish in the family Sisoridae.

The species lives in India. It is known from only four specimens collected from an unknown location for the species description, and it has not been collected since.
