= Quan Hóa district =

Coordinates: 20.417°N 104.917°E

Quan Hóa district Huyện Quan Hóa
- District
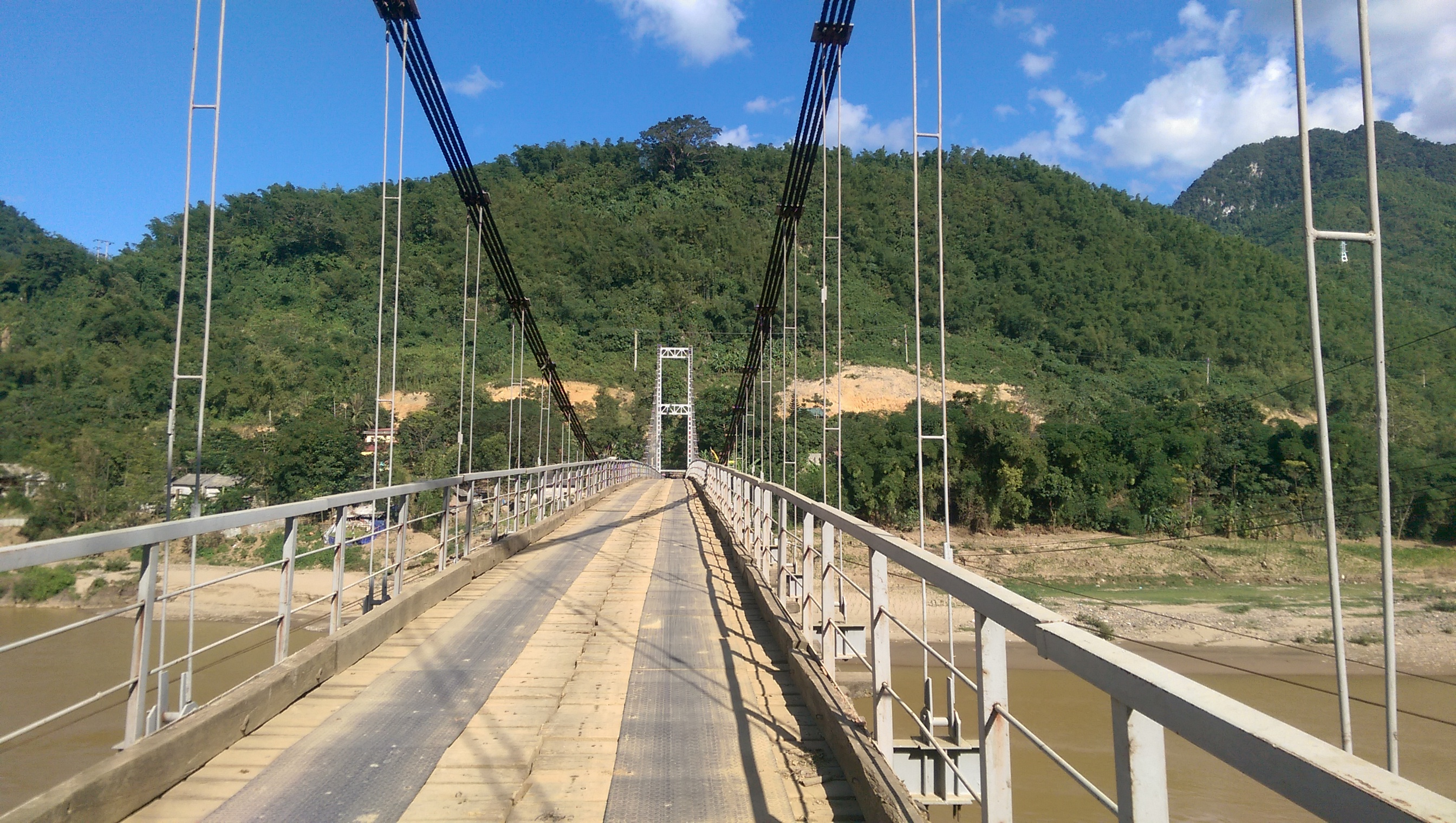
- View of suspension bridge in Thanh Hó
- Interactive map of Quan Hóa district
- Country: Vietnam
- Region: North Central Coast
- Province: Thanh Hóa
- Capital: Quan Hóa

Area
  - Total: 385 sq mi (996 km^{2})

Population (2019)
  - Total: 53,070
- Time zone: UTC+7 (UTC + 7)

Quan Hóa district (Vietnamese: huyện Quan Hóa) is a district of Thanh Hóa province in the North Central Coast region of Vietnam.

As of 2019 the district had a population of 53,070. The district covers an area of 996 km^{2}. The district capital lies at Quan Hóa.

Trung Sơn commune is the site of the Trung Sơn Hydropower Project.

== Climate ==
Climate data for Hồi Xuân, Quan Hóa District
Month	Jan	Feb	Mar	Apr	May	Jun	Jul	Aug	Sep	Oct	Nov	Dec	Year
Record high °C (°F)	35.1 (95.2)	36.8 (98.2)	40.7 (105.3)	41.0 (105.8)	41.7 (107.1)	41.3 (106.3)	40.3 (104.5)	39.0 (102.2)	40.6 (105.1)	37.8 (100.0)	35.6 (96.1)	34.9 (94.8)	41.7 (107.1)
Mean daily maximum °C (°F)	21.6 (70.9)	23.0 (73.4)	25.9 (78.6)	30.3 (86.5)	33.4 (92.1)	33.9 (93.0)	33.8 (92.8)	32.9 (91.2)	31.6 (88.9)	29.3 (84.7)	26.3 (79.3)	23.2 (73.8)	28.7 (83.7)
Daily mean °C (°F)	17.0 (62.6)	18.5 (65.3)	21.1 (70.0)	24.7 (76.5)	27.0 (80.6)	27.8 (82.0)	27.7 (81.9)	27.2 (81.0)	26.2 (79.2)	23.9 (75.0)	20.8 (69.4)	17.8 (64.0)	23.3 (73.9)
Mean daily minimum °C (°F)	14.4 (57.9)	15.9 (60.6)	18.4 (65.1)	21.5 (70.7)	23.4 (74.1)	24.5 (76.1)	24.4 (75.9)	24.3 (75.7)	23.4 (74.1)	21.1 (70.0)	18.0 (64.4)	15.0 (59.0)	20.4 (68.7)
Record low °C (°F)	2.5 (36.5)	5.8 (42.4)	6.0 (42.8)	12.5 (54.5)	16.3 (61.3)	17.0 (62.6)	20.2 (68.4)	19.6 (67.3)	16.7 (62.1)	10.9 (51.6)	6.4 (43.5)	2.1 (35.8)	2.1 (35.8)
Average precipitation mm (inches)	17.2 (0.68)	15.5 (0.61)	36.2 (1.43)	91.9 (3.62)	220.4 (8.68)	254.0 (10.00)	326.3 (12.85)	332.9 (13.11)	273.9 (10.78)	153.5 (6.04)	45.9 (1.81)	16.3 (0.64)	1,784.1 (70.24)
Average rainy days	7.7	8.9	11.5	14.2	17.6	18.6	19.4	19.2	15.4	11.4	7.5	5.4	156.6
Average relative humidity (%)	85.6	85.1	84.5	83.5	82.1	84.6	85.5	87.1	87.4	86.9	86.1	85.1	85.3
Mean monthly sunshine hours	70.9	65.1	75.9	119.1	169.3	148.7	154.7	152.5	142.5	124.0	114.8	100.1	1,437.6
Source: Vietnam Institute for Building Science and Technology
