= Glyptothorax buchanani =

Conservation status
- Data Deficient (IUCN 3.1)

Scientific classification
- Kingdom: Animalia
- Phylum: Chordata
- Class: Actinopterygii
- Order: Siluriformes
- Family: Sisoridae
- Genus: Glyptothorax
- Species: G. buchanani

Binomial name
- Glyptothorax buchanani Smith, 1945

Species of fish

Glyptothorax buchanani is a species of catfish that was first described by Smith, 1945. Glyptothorax buchanani is a species in genus Glyptothorax, family Sisoridae and order Siluriformes. IUCN categorise the species as insufficiently studied globally. No subspecies are listed in Catalogue of Life.
