= Bagarius suchus =

Conservation status
- Near Threatened (IUCN 3.1)

Scientific classification
- Kingdom: Animalia
- Phylum: Chordata
- Class: Actinopterygii
- Order: Siluriformes
- Family: Sisoridae
- Genus: Bagarius
- Species: B. suchus

Binomial name
- Bagarius suchus Roberts, 1983

Species of catfish

The crocodile catfish (Bagarius suchus) is a species of sisorid catfish native to Laos, Cambodia and Thailand, where it occurs in the Mekong and Chao Phraya river basins. This species reaches a maximum length of 70 centimetres (28 in) SL.

== Ecology ==
This species lives in cool, fast-flowing water with a pH range of 6.0 to 7.2 and a temperature range of 18.0 to 23.0 °C (64.4 to 73.4 °F).
