= Glyptothorax kudremukhensis =

Conservation status
- Critically Endangered (IUCN 3.1)

Scientific classification
- Kingdom: Animalia
- Phylum: Chordata
- Class: Actinopterygii
- Order: Siluriformes
- Family: Sisoridae
- Genus: Glyptothorax
- Species: G. kudremukhensis

Binomial name
- Glyptothorax kudremukhensis K. C. Gopi, 2007

Species of catfish

Glyptothorax kudremukhensis is a species of catfish in family Sisoridae and was described by K.C. Gopi in 2007. It is endemic to the Western Ghats and only known from the Tunga River from inside the Kudremukh National Park. IUCN categorises the species as critically endangered. No subspecies are listed in the Catalogue of Life.
