= Glyptothorax caudimaculatus =

Scientific classification
- Kingdom: Animalia
- Phylum: Chordata
- Class: Actinopterygii
- Order: Siluriformes
- Family: Sisoridae
- Genus: Glyptothorax
- Species: G. caudimaculatus

Binomial name
- Glyptothorax caudimaculatus Anganthoibi & Vishwanath, 2011

Species of fish

Glyptothorax caudimaculatus is a species of catfish that was first described by Anganthoibi and Vishwanath 2011. Glyptothorax caudimaculatus is a species in genus Glyptothorax, family Sisoridae and order Siluriformes. No subspecies are listed in Catalogue of Life. It is found in the Kaladan River basin in Mizoram State, India.
