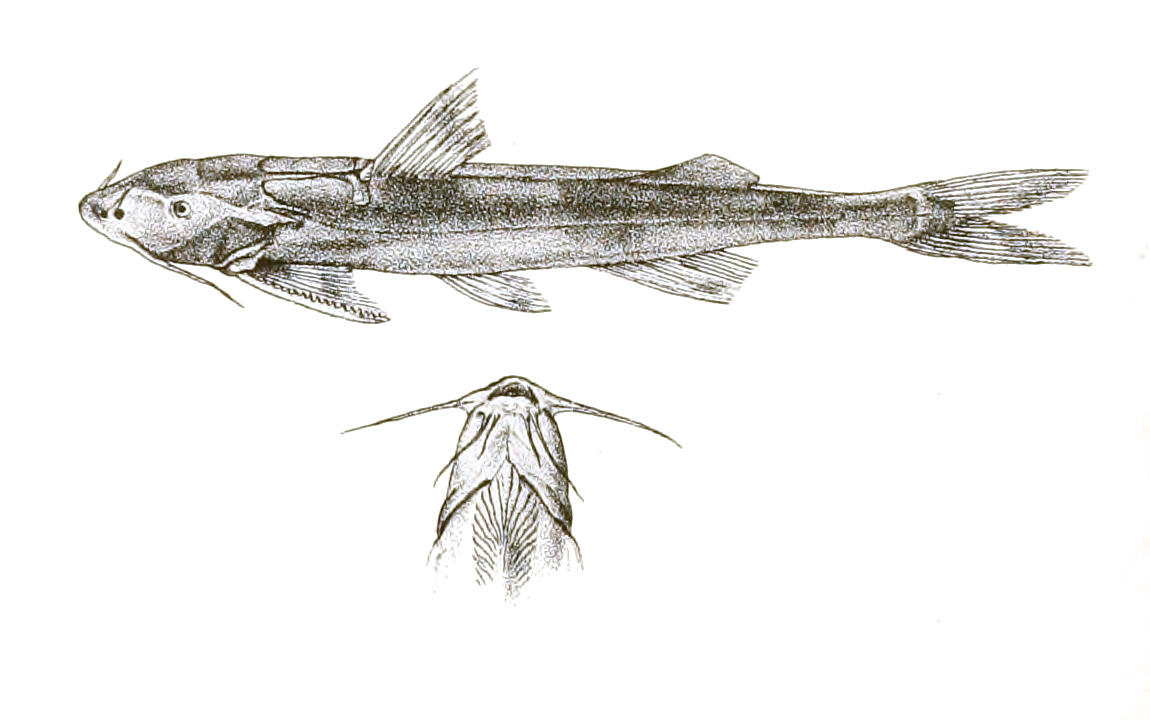

Conservation status
- Least Concern (IUCN 3.1)

Scientific classification
- Kingdom: Animalia
- Phylum: Chordata
- Class: Actinopterygii
- Order: Siluriformes
- Family: Sisoridae
- Genus: Glyptothorax
- Species: G. telchitta

Binomial name
- Glyptothorax telchitta (Hamilton, 1822)

= Glyptothorax telchitta =

Species of fish

Glyptothorax telchitta is a species of fish in the family Sisoridae. This species can be found in Pakistan, India, Bangladesh and Nepal.
