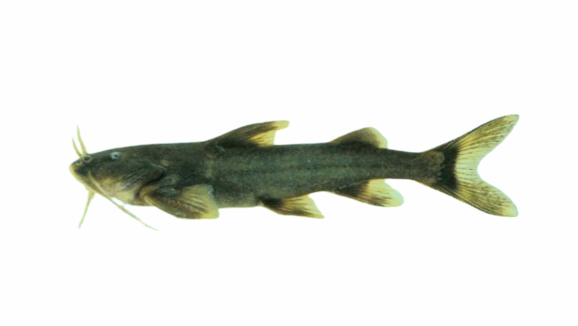

Conservation status
- Critically Endangered (IUCN 3.1)

Scientific classification
- Kingdom: Animalia
- Phylum: Chordata
- Class: Actinopterygii
- Order: Siluriformes
- Family: Sisoridae
- Genus: Glyptothorax
- Species: G. kashmirensis

Binomial name
- Glyptothorax kashmirensis Hora, 1923

Synonyms
- Glyptothorax naziri Mirza & Naik, 1969

= Glyptothorax kashmirensis =

Species of fish

Glyptothorax kashmirensis is a species of catfish that was described by Sunder Lal Hora in 1923. Glyptothorax kashmirensis is a species in genus Glyptothorax, family Sisoridae and order Siluriformes. IUCN categorise the species as critically endangered globally. No subspecies are listed in Catalogue of Life.
