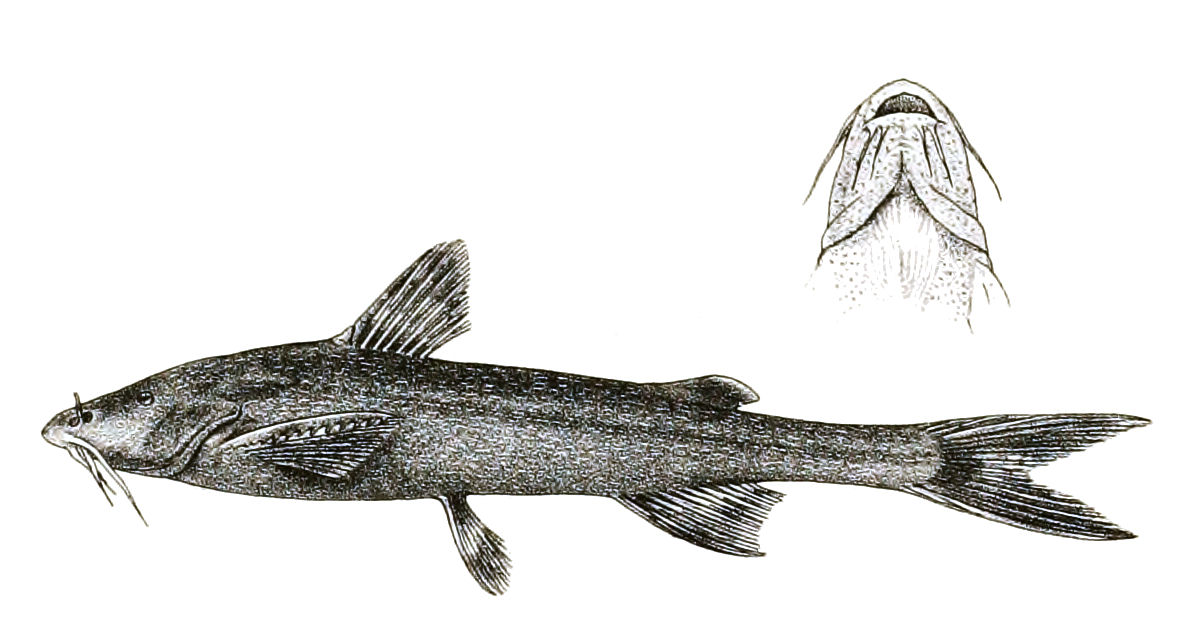

Conservation status
- Least Concern (IUCN 3.1)

Scientific classification
- Kingdom: Animalia
- Phylum: Chordata
- Class: Actinopterygii
- Order: Siluriformes
- Family: Sisoridae
- Genus: Glyptothorax
- Species: G. botius

Binomial name
- Glyptothorax botius (Hamilton, 1822)

Synonyms
- Glyptothorax telchitta (non Hamilton, 1822); Glyptosternum telchitta (non Hamilton, 1822); Pimelodus botius Hamilton, 1822

= Glyptothorax botius =

Species of fish

Glyptothorax botius is a species of catfish that was first described by Hamilton 1822. Glyptothorax botius is a species in genus Glyptothorax, family Sisoridae and order Siluriformes. IUCN categorise the species as least concern globally. No subspecies are listed in Catalogue of Life.
