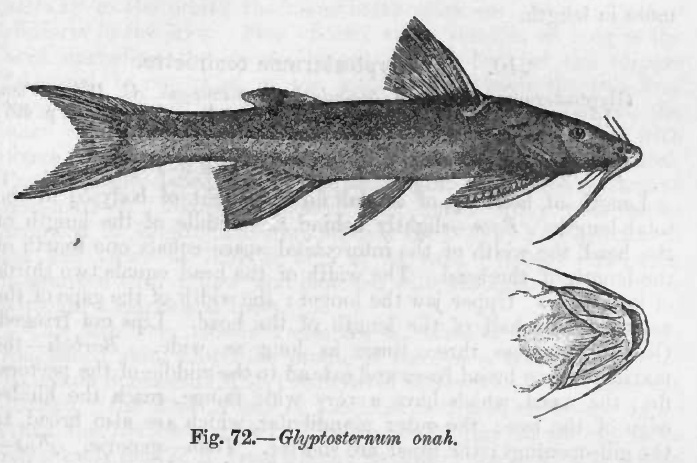
- Glyptothorax lonah

Scientific classification
- Kingdom: Animalia
- Phylum: Chordata
- Class: Actinopterygii
- Order: Siluriformes
- Family: Sisoridae
- Subfamily: Glyptosterninae
- Tribe: Glyptothoracini de Pinna, 1996
- Genus: Glyptothorax; Blyth, 1860

Type species
- Glyptosternon striatus McClelland, 1842

Synonyms
- Aglyptosternon Bleeker, 1862; Euclyptosternum Günther, 1864; Paraglyptothorax Li, 1986; Pteroglanis Fowler, 1934; Pteropsoglanis Fowler, 1934; Sundagagata Boeseman, 1966; Superglyptothorax Li, 1986

= Glyptothorax =

Genus of fishes

Glyptothorax is a genus of catfishes order Siluriformes of the family Sisoridae. It is the most species-rich and widely distributed genus in the family with new species being discovered on a regular basis. These species are distributed in the Black Sea basin, northern Turkey, south and east to the Yangtze River drainage in China and south throughout Indo-China to Java, Indonesia. They are found in Asia Minor (in the Tigris and Euphrates River drainages) and southwards to Southeast Asia. The genus is very diverse in the Indian subcontinent. Southeast Asian species tend to have restricted distributions.

== Description ==
This genus is easily distinguished from other sisorids by having an adhesive apparatus on the thorax with grooves parallel or oblique to the longitudinal axis of the body, as opposed to grooves transverse to the longitudinal axis of body or the thoracic adhesive apparatus entirely absent. The dorsal fin and pectoral fins have strong spines. The dorsal fin spine is smooth or serrate on the front edge and smooth or finely serrated on the posterior edge. The pectoral fin spine is serrated on the front edge. The head is small and depressed and the snout is conical. The body is elongate, from moderately to greatly depressed. The skin is either smooth or tuberculate. The eyes are small and dorsally placed. The lips are thick, fleshy and often papillate. The maxillary barbels have a well-developed membrane and a soft base. The gill openings are wide. The paired fins are plaited and modified to form an adhesive apparatus in some species of Glyptothorax.

== Ecology ==
Like other sisorids, these fish are rheophilic, that is they inhabit fast-flowing streams, where they are adapted to live by using the adhesive apparatus on the underside to attach themselves to rocks and prevent being washed away.

== Species ==
These are the currently recognized species in this genus:

- Glyptothorax alaknandi Tilak, 1969
- Glyptothorax amnestus Ng & Kottelat, 2016
- Glyptothorax anamalaiensis Silas, 1952
- Glyptothorax annandalei Hora, 1923
- Glyptothorax armeniacus (L. S. Berg, 1918) (Armenian mountain catfish)
- Glyptothorax ater Anganthoibi & Vishwanath, 2011
- Glyptothorax bhurainu Vijayakrishnan & Shinde, 2025
- Glyptothorax botius (F. Hamilton, 1822)
- Glyptothorax brevipinnis Hora, 1923
- Glyptothorax buchanani H. M. Smith, 1945
- Glyptothorax burmanicus Prashad & Mukerji, 1929
- Glyptothorax callopterus H. M. Smith, 1945
- Glyptothorax caudimaculatus Anganthoibi & Vishwanath, 2011
- Glyptothorax cavia (F. Hamilton, 1822)
- Glyptothorax chakpiensis Shangningam & Kosygin, 2025
- Glyptothorax chimtuipuiensis Anganthoibi & Vishwanath, 2010
- Glyptothorax churamanii Rameshori & Vishwanath, 2012
- Glyptothorax clavatus Rameshori & Vishwanath, 2014
- Glyptothorax conirostris (Steindachner, 1867)
- Glyptothorax coracinus H. H. Ng & Rainboth, 2008
- Glyptothorax cous (Linnaeus, 1766)
- Glyptothorax daemon Freyhof, Kaya, Abdullah & Geiger, 2021
- Glyptothorax dakpathari Tilak & Husain, 1976
- Glyptothorax davissinghi Manimekalan & H. S. Das, 1998
- Glyptothorax decussatus H. H. Ng & Kottelat, 2016
- Glyptothorax deqinensis T. P. Mo & X. L. Chu, 1986
- Glyptothorax dikrongensis Tamang & Chaudhry, 2011
- Glyptothorax distichus Kosygin, Singh & Gurumayum, 2020
- Glyptothorax dorsalis Vinciguerra, 1890
- Glyptothorax elankadensis Plamoottil & Abraham, 2013 (Travancore rock catfish)
- Glyptothorax exodon H. H. Ng & Rachmatika, 2005
- Glyptothorax famelicus Ng & Kottelat, 2016
- Glyptothorax filicatus H. H. Ng & Freyhof, 2008
- Glyptothorax forabilis H. H. Ng & Kottelat, 2017
- Glyptothorax fucatus W. S. Jiang, H. H. Ng, J. X. Yang & X. Y. Chen, 2012
- Glyptothorax fuscus Fowler, 1934
- Glyptothorax garhwali Tilak, 1969
- Glyptothorax giudikyensis Kosygin, Singh & Gurumayum, 2020
- Glyptothorax gopii Kosygin, Das, Singh & Chowdhury, 2019
- Glyptothorax gracilis (Günther, 1864)
- Glyptothorax granosus W. S. Jiang, H. H. Ng, J. X. Yang & X. Y. Chen, 2012
- Glyptothorax granulus Vishwanath & Linthoingambi, 2007
- Glyptothorax hainanensis (Nichols & C. H. Pope, 1927)
- Glyptothorax heokheei Singh, Chowdhury, Gurumayum & Kosygin, 2023
- Glyptothorax himalaicus Vijayakrishnan & Shinde, 2025
- Glyptothorax honghensis S. S. Li, 1984
- Glyptothorax horai (Fowler, 1934)
- Glyptothorax housei Herre, 1942
- Glyptothorax hymavatiae Tenali, Adak, Chandran, Singh, Sarkar & Banerjee, 2025
- Glyptothorax igniculus H. H. Ng & S. O. Kullander, 2013
- Glyptothorax indicus Talwar, 1991
- Glyptothorax interspinalum (Đ. Y. Mai, 1978)
- Glyptothorax irroratus Ng & Kottelat, 2023
- Glyptothorax jalalensis Balon (pl) & K. Hensel, 1970
- Glyptothorax jayarami Rameshori & Vishwanath, 2012
- Glyptothorax kailashi Kosygin, Singh & Mitra, 2020
- Glyptothorax kashmirensis Hora, 1923
- Glyptothorax keluk H. H. Ng & Kottelat, 2016
- Glyptothorax ketambe H. H. Ng & Hadiaty, 2009
- Glyptothorax kudremukhensis K. C. Gopi, 2007
- Glyptothorax kurdistanicus (L. S. Berg, 1931)
- Glyptothorax lairamkhullensis Devi, Linthoingambi & Singh, 2023
- Glyptothorax lampris Fowler, 1934
- Glyptothorax lanceatus H. H. Ng, W. S. Jiang & X. Y. Chen, 2012
- Glyptothorax laosensis Fowler, 1934
- Glyptothorax lonah (Sykes, 1839)
- Glyptothorax longicauda S. S. Li, 1984
- Glyptothorax longinema S. S. Li, 1984
- Glyptothorax longjiangensis T. P. Mo & X. L. Chu, 1986
- Glyptothorax maceriatus H. H. Ng & Lalramliana, 2012
- Glyptothorax macromaculatus S. S. Li, 1984
- Glyptothorax madraspatanus (F. Day, 1873)
- Glyptothorax major (Boulenger, 1894)
- Glyptothorax malabarensis K. C. Gopi, 2010
- Glyptothorax manipurensis Menon, 1955
- Glyptothorax medogensis Chen & He, 2024
- Glyptothorax mibangi Darshan, Dutta, Kachari, Gogoi & D. N. Das, 2015
- Glyptothorax minimaculatus S. S. Li, 1984
- Glyptothorax motbungensis Premananda & Singh, 2023
- Glyptothorax nelsoni Ganguly, N. C. Datta & S. Sen, 1972
- Glyptothorax ngapang Vishwanath & Linthoingambi, 2007
- Glyptothorax nieuwenhuisi (Vaillant, 1902)
- Glyptothorax obliquimaculatus W. S. Jiang, X. Y. Chen & J. X. Yang, 2010
- Glyptothorax palakkadiensis Singh & Kosygin, 2025
- Glyptothorax pallens Mousavi-Sabet, Eagderi, Vatandoust & Freyhof, 2021
- Glyptothorax pallozonus (S. Y. Lin, 1934)
- Glyptothorax panda Ferraris & Britz, 2005
- Glyptothorax pantherinus Anganthoibi & Vishwanath, 2013
- Glyptothorax pasighatensis Arunkumar, 2016
- Glyptothorax pectinopterus (McClelland, 1842) (River catfish)
- Glyptothorax pedunculatus Roberts, 2021
- Glyptothorax pictus H. H. Ng & Kottelat, 2016
- Glyptothorax platypogon Valenciennes, 1840
- Glyptothorax platypogonides (Bleeker, 1855)
- Glyptothorax plectilis H. H. Ng & Hadiaty, 2008
- Glyptothorax pongoensis Tenali, Singh, Pratap, Phom, Ratnaraju & Kosygin, 2024
- Glyptothorax poonaensis Hora, 1938
- Glyptothorax porrectus H. H. Ng & Kottelat, 2017
- Glyptothorax prashadi Mukerji, 1932
- Glyptothorax primusplicae Shangningam & Kosygin, 2023
- Glyptothorax prionotos Ng & Kottelat, 2023
- Glyptothorax pulcher Zeng et al., 2026
- Glyptothorax punjabensis Mirza & Kashmiri, 1971
- Glyptothorax punyabratai Tenali, Sarkar, Chandran & Singh, 2024
- Glyptothorax quadriocellatus (Đ. Y. Mai, 1978)
- Glyptothorax radiolus H. H. Ng & Lalramliana, 2013
- Glyptothorax rara Chen & He, 2024
- Glyptothorax robustus (Boeseman, 1966)
- Glyptothorax rugimentum H. H. Ng & Kottelat, 2008
- Glyptothorax rupiri (L. Kosygin, P. Singh & S. Rath, 2021)
- Glyptothorax saisii (J. T. Jenkins, 1910)
- Glyptothorax sardashtensis Jokar, Kamangar, Ghaderi & Freyhof 2023
- Glyptothorax schmidti (Volz, 1904)
- Glyptothorax sentimereni
- Glyptothorax scrobiculus H. H. Ng & Lalramliana, 2012
- Glyptothorax senapatiensis Premananda, Kosygin & Saidullah, 2015
- Glyptothorax siangensis Singh, Kosygin, Rath & Gurumayum, 2024
- Glyptothorax silviae Coad, 1981
- Glyptothorax sinensis (Regan, 1908)
- Glyptothorax steindachneri (Pietschmann, 1913) (Steindachner’s catfish)
- Glyptothorax stibaros H. H. Ng & Kottelat, 2016
- Glyptothorax stocki Mirza & Nijssen, 1978
- Glyptothorax stolickae (Steindachner, 1867)
- Glyptothorax strabonis H. H. Ng & Freyhof, 2008
- Glyptothorax striatus (McClelland, 1842)
- Glyptothorax sufii K. Asghar Bashir & Mirza, 1975
- Glyptothorax sykesi (F. Day, 1873)
- Glyptothorax telchitta (Hamilton, 1822)
- Glyptothorax trewavasae Hora, 1938
- Glyptothorax trilineatus Blyth, 1860 (Three-lined catfish)
- Glyptothorax vatandousti Jouladeh-Roudbar, Ghanavi & Freyhof, 2023
- Glyptothorax ventrolineatus Vishwanath & Linthoingambi, 2006
- Glyptothorax verrucosus Rameshori & Vishwanath, 2012
- Glyptothorax viridis Shangningam & Kosygin, 2023
- Glyptothorax waikhomi Shangningam & Kosygin, 2022
- Glyptothorax yuensis Shangningam & Kosygin, 2022
- Glyptothorax zanaensis X. W. Wu, M. J. He & X. L. Chu, 1981
- Glyptothorax zeiladensis Shangningam, Kosygin & Gurumayum, 2024
- Glyptothorax zhujiangensis Y. H. Lin, 2003

Synonyms

- Glyptothorax alidaeii Mousavi-Sabet, Eagderi, Vatandoust & Freyhof, 2021; valid as Glyptothorax silviae
- Glyptothorax chavomensis Arunkumar & Moyon, 2017; valid as Glyptothorax ngapang
- Glyptothorax chindwinica Vishwanath & Linthoingambi, 2007; valid as Glyptothorax burmanicus
- Glyptothorax coheni Ganguly, Datta & Sen, 1972; valid as Glyptothorax saisii
- Glyptothorax fokiensis (Rendahl (de), 1925); valid as Glyptothorax sinensis
- Glyptothorax galaxias Mousavi-Sabet, Eagderi, Vatandoust & Freyhof, 2021; valid as Glyptothorax silviae
- Glyptothorax hosseinpanahii Mousavi-Sabet, Eagderi, Vatandoust & Freyhof, 2021; valid as Glyptothorax silviae
- Glyptothorax laak (Popta, 1904); valid as Glyptothorax nieuwenhuisi
- Glyptothorax merus Li, 1984; valid as Glyptothorax interspinalum
- Glyptothorax minutus Hora, 1921; valid as Glyptothorax dorsalis
- Glyptothorax naziri Mirza & I. U. Naik, 1969; valid as Glyptothorax kashmirensis
- Glyptothorax obscurus S. S. Li, 1984); valid as Glyptothorax quadriocellatus
- Glyptothorax rubermentus Li, 1984; valid as Glyptothorax longinema
- Glyptothorax shapuri Mousavi-Sabet, Eagderi, Vatandoust, & Freyhof 2021; valid as Glyptothorax silviae
- Glyptothorax siamensis Hora, 1923; valid as Glyptothorax schmidti
- Glyptothorax spectrum Kottelat, 2001; valid as Glyptothorax quadriocellatus
- Glyptothorax trilineatoides Li, 1984; valid as Glyptothorax trilineatus
