= Glyptothorax alaknandi =

Conservation status
- Least Concern (IUCN 3.1)

Scientific classification
- Kingdom: Animalia
- Phylum: Chordata
- Class: Actinopterygii
- Order: Siluriformes
- Family: Sisoridae
- Genus: Glyptothorax
- Species: G. alaknandi

Binomial name
- Glyptothorax alaknandi Tilak, 1969

Synonyms
- Glyptothorax brevipinnis alaknanda Tilak, 1969; Glyptothorax brevipinnis alaknandi Tilak, 1969

Species of fish

Glyptothorax alaknandi is a species of catfish that was first described by Tilak, 1969. Glyptothorax alaknandi is a species in genus Glyptothorax, family Sisoridae and order Siluriformes. IUCN categorise the species as least concern globally. No subspecies are listed in Catalogue of Life.
