= River Monsters =

Wildlife documentary television series

- Poster from Season One
- Genre: Documentary; Fishing
- Directed by: Stef Dijkstra; Charlotte Jones; Barny Revill; Luke Wiles; Lucy d'Auvergne; Duncan Chard; Stephen Gooder; Alex Parkinson; Dominic Weston; Ben Roy; Doug Hope; Charlier Bingham; Daniel Huertas; Jody Bourton; Daniel Rasmussen
- Presented by: Jeremy Wade
- Composers: Timo Baker; Audio Network; Musicotopia
- Country of origin: United Kingdom
- No. of series: 9
- No. of episodes: 57 + 44 specials + 2 additional episodes

Production
- Executive producers: Harry Marshall; Laura Marshall; Lisa Bosak Lucas
- Producers: Andie Clare; Luke Wiles; Doug MacKay Hope
- Running time: 40 minutes 50 minutes (extended cut); 90 minutes (some episodes)
- Production companies: Icon Films, Discovery Channel, ITV Studios

Original release
- Network: Animal Planet, ITV, Discovery Channel, Discovery MAX
- Release: 5 April 2009 – 28 May 2017

River Monsters is a British wildlife documentary television series produced for Animal Planet by Icon Films of Bristol, United Kingdom. It is hosted by angler and biologist Jeremy Wade, who travels around the globe in search of large and dangerous fish.

River Monsters premiered on ITV in Great Britain and became one of the most-watched programmes in Animal Planet's history. It is also one of the most-viewed series on Discovery Channel in the American market.

== Overview ==
River Monsters follows the worldwide adventures of Suffolk-born British host, biologist, adventurer and extreme angler Jeremy Wade. He explores rivers and lakes to uncover the creatures behind local folklore and harrowing tales of monster fish. The show has taken viewers to England, Scotland, Cambodia, Canada, Germany, Spain, Colombia, Bolivia, Iceland, Norway, Austria, Greenland, Argentina, Australia, Fiji, New Zealand, Papua New Guinea, India, Japan, France, Russia, Suriname, Brazil, Guyana, The Solomon Islands, Indonesia, Zambia, Malaysia, Nepal, The Bahamas, The Cayman Islands, Mexico, Peru, Uganda, South Africa, Democratic Republic of the Congo, Nicaragua, Mongolia, Ukraine, Botswana, and the U.S.

In the first season, Wade's weekly quest had him in search of piranha, goonch catfish (during his investigation of the Kali River goonch attacks), alligator gar, wels catfish, arapaima, piraíba and the bull shark. All of them are potentially deadly creatures poorly understood by humans. The show also focuses on explaining the creatures' feeding habits, behaviour and conservation status. Rebroadcasts of the episodes with captions showing behind the scenes commentary from the host about the particular episode can also be seen on both Animal Planet and Discovery Channel.

The second series of River Monsters began airing on 24 April 2010, although the first episode, titled "Demon Fish" first appeared on Discovery Channel on 28 March 2010. In the episode "Death Ray," Wade caught a pregnant giant freshwater stingray, the largest fish he ever landed. She later gave birth to two pups while being examined by Wade and a team of biologists. This season featured the white sturgeon, Wade's second largest catch.

The ninth season of River Monsters was announced as the final season.

In October 2026, Wade announced the return of the show in a form of a video podcast. The first episode was released for Patreon subscribers on October 20, 2026, and released for a wider public on October 27 on YouTube.

== Episodes ==
Season	Episodes	Originally released	
Season	Episodes	First released	Last released
1	7	5 April 2009	17 May 2009
2	7	28 March 2010 (Note: "Demon Fish" premiered on Discovery Channel on 28 March 2010 as a preview; the season's run on Animal Planet began on 25 April 2010.)	30 May 2010
3	7	10 April 2011	30 May 2011
4	7 (Note: The two-hour season finale "Lair of Giants" (28 May 2012) is counted here as a special.)	1 April 2012	20 May 2012
5	6	7 April 2013	27 May 2013
6	6	6 April 2014	26 May 2014
7	6	5 April 2015	17 May 2015
8	5	7 April 2016	26 May 2016
9	6	23 April 2017	28 May 2017

== US ratings ==
River Monsters had the best series premiere in Animal Planet's network history with 1.3 million viewers. It was also its most watched regularly airing primetime telecast in over six years. The second episode of Animal Planet's River Monsters delivered a 39% boost in total viewers (1.866 million) compared to the series premiere. It was the best performing regularly scheduled primetime telecast in Animal Planet's history. The first season of River Monsters made it the best performing show in Animal Planet's history with every episode averaging over 1 million households. The series finale was watched by about 1.47 million households.

The second season premiere episode became the network's best season premiere ever. It drew in 1.7 million total viewers.

== See also ==
- Kali River goonch attacks
- Fish Warrior
