= Glyptothorax exodon =

Conservation status
- Vulnerable (IUCN 3.1)

Scientific classification
- Kingdom: Animalia
- Phylum: Chordata
- Class: Actinopterygii
- Order: Siluriformes
- Family: Sisoridae
- Genus: Glyptothorax
- Species: G. exodon

Binomial name
- Glyptothorax exodon H. H. Ng & Rachmatika, 2005

Species of fish

Glyptothorax exodon is a species of sisorid catfish.

Location: They typically inhabit fast flowing hillstreams or faster-flowing stretches of larger rivers. It is only found in the drainage basin of the Kapuas River, Borneo.

Identification:

This species can be readily distinguished from most other Glyptothorax species of the region by its slender body. The only possible confusion is with Glyptothorax platypogonides (as which this species was originally misidentified) and Glyptothorax siamensis but G. exodon can be identified by its relatively large eye, uniformly mottled colour without distinct pale stripes and a large area of premaxillary teeth visible when the mouth is closed. This species of catfish possesses suction cups under its belly to allow itself to stick to smooth surfaces on the river bed, thus, allowing it to resist the fierce currents of the Kapuas River system. This species grows to a length of 6.3 centimetres (2.5 in) SL.
