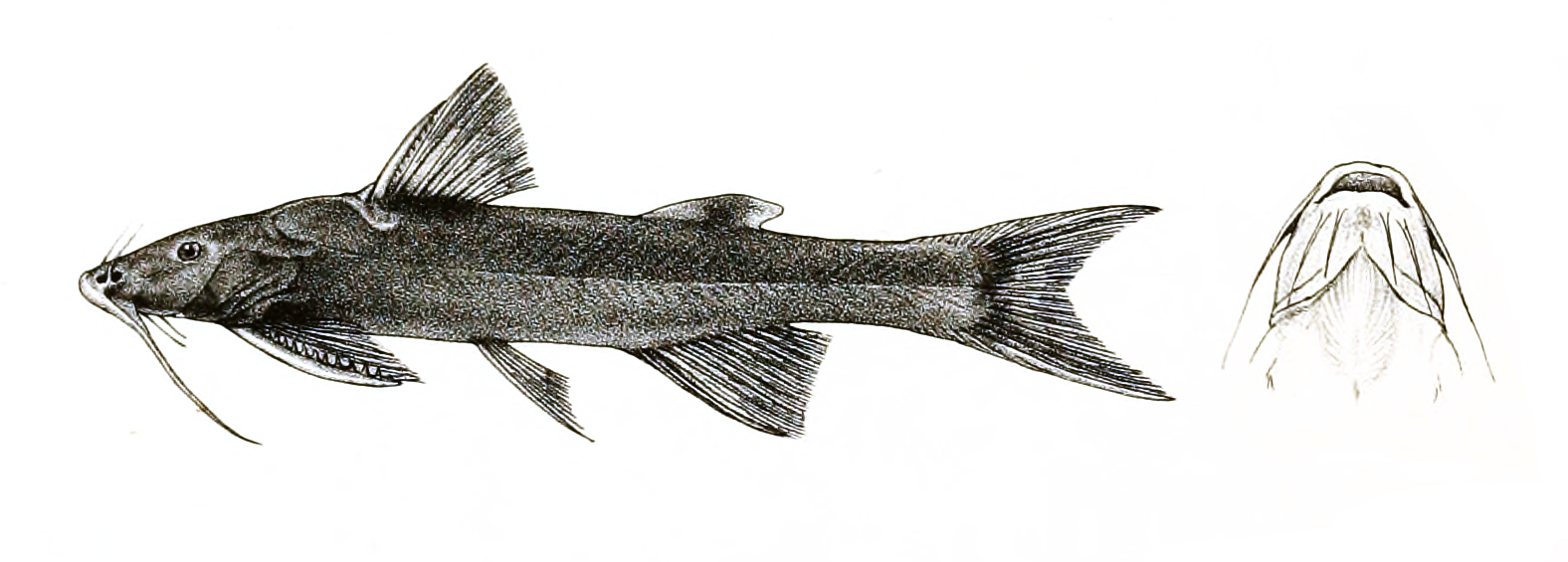

Conservation status
- Data Deficient (IUCN 3.1)

Scientific classification
- Kingdom: Animalia
- Phylum: Chordata
- Class: Actinopterygii
- Order: Siluriformes
- Family: Sisoridae
- Genus: Glyptothorax
- Species: G. conirostris

Binomial name
- Glyptothorax conirostris (Steindachner, 1867)

Synonyms
- Glyptothorax garhwali (non Tilak, 1969); Glyptosternum lonah (non Sykes, 1938); Glyptosternum modestum (non Day, 1872); Glyptothorax conirostre (Steindachner, 1867); Glyptothorax conirostre (Steindachner, 1867); Glyptothorax cavia (Steindachner, 1867); Glyptosternum conirostre Steindachner, 1867

= Glyptothorax conirostris =

Species of fish

Glyptothorax conirostris is a species of catfish that was first described by Steindachner, 1867. Glyptothorax conirostris is a species in genus Glyptothorax, family Sisoridae and order Siluriformes. IUCN categorise the species as insufficiently studied globally. No subspecies are listed in Catalogue of Life.
