= Survive the Tribe =

Television series

Survive the Tribe is a television series which airs on the National Geographic Channel. In the program Hazen Audel visits several tribes around the world and participates in their daily lives. He learns about their survival tactics. Hazen Audel went on to make Primal Survivor, also for National Geographic.

== Production ==
The series is produced by Icon Films. It aired in the United States and the United Kingdom in July 2014, with other countries following later the same year.

== Format ==
In Survive the Tribe Audel joins a tribe for a week and is trained in several of the survival skills the tribe has used to survive over the years. Audel is a trained biologist who works as a survival guide. In the show he adopts the customs, diet and way of life to live with and as the members of the tribe he visits.

== Series overview ==
Season	Episodes	Originally released	
Season	Episodes	First released	Last released
1	6	July 24, 2014	August 28, 2014
2	TBA	January 6, 2016	TBA

== Episodes ==
=== Season 1 (2014) ===
No.	Title	Original release date
1	"Blood Warriors"	July 24, 2014
Audel joins the Samburu in Kenya.
2	"Rainforest Masters"	July 24, 2014
Audel joins the Huaorani people in the Amazon region of Ecuador. He is taught the basic lessons of hunting and gathering.
3	"Eagle Assassins"	July 31, 2014
In this episode Audel travels to the western part of Mongolia where he lives with the Kazakhs. He learns how to hunt with Golden eagles and is confronted with extreme cold.
4	"Solomon Shark Hunters"	August 14, 2014
Audel travels to the Solomon Islands where he learns to make a canoe out of a tree and use it in the hunt for sharks.
5	"Desert Hunters"	August 21, 2014
In this episode Audel travels to Namibia to live for a week with the San. He is prepared to join a hunt through the Kalahari Desert with four others.
6	"Arctic Endurance"	August 28, 2014
Audel goes to Arctic Canada to join the Inuit.

=== Season 2 (2016) ===
No.	Title	Original release date
1	"Cannibal Legend"	January 6, 2016
Hazen Audel attempts to reach a former headhunting village, travelling across crocodile-infested lakes and crossing ancient tribal boundaries.
2	"Savage Jungle"	TBA
Hazen Audel embarks on a journey to the notorious Darien Gap, based on a traditional solo jungle trek made by young men of the Embera tribe.
3	"Killer Cold"	TBA
Explorer Hazen Audel embarks on a challenging solo mission to safely deliver 200 reindeer to their spring birthing grounds in the Arctic Circle.
