= Glyptothorax alidaeii =

Scientific classification
- Kingdom: Animalia
- Phylum: Chordata
- Class: Actinopterygii
- Order: Siluriformes
- Family: Sisoridae
- Genus: Glyptothorax
- Species: G. alidaeii

Binomial name
- Glyptothorax alidaeii Mousavi-Sabet, Eagderi, Vatandoust and Freyhof, 2021

Species of fish

Glyptothorax alidaeii is a species of catfish in the family Sisoridae.

This species live in western Iran and was named after football player Ali Daei.
