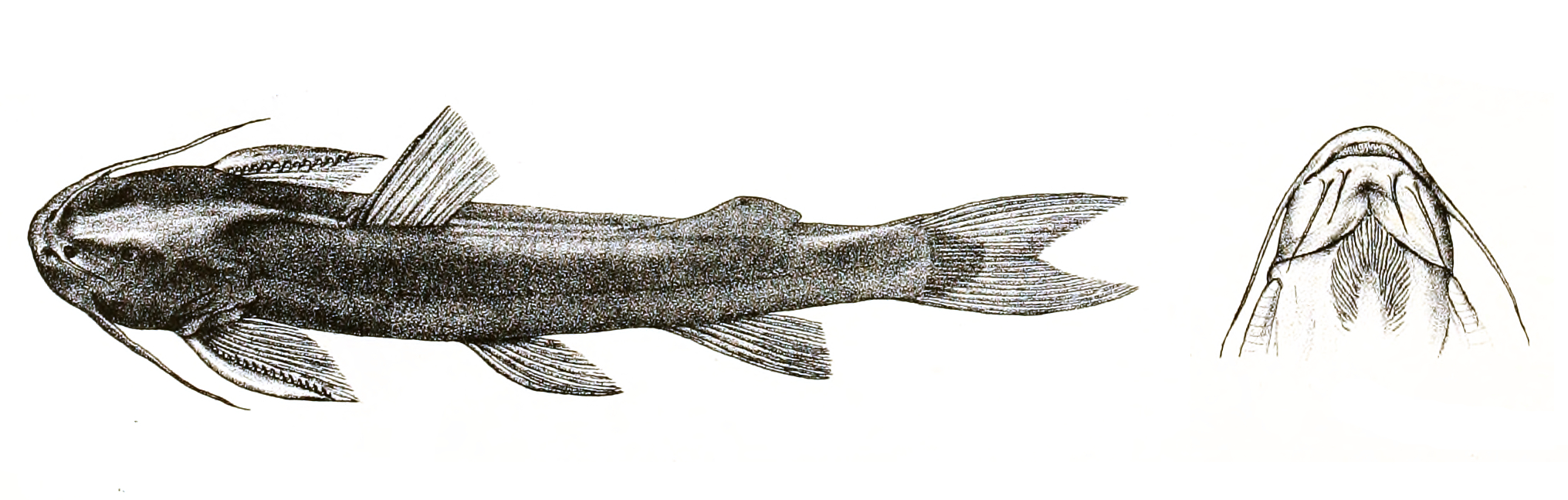

Conservation status
- Least Concern (IUCN 3.1)

Scientific classification
- Kingdom: Animalia
- Phylum: Chordata
- Class: Actinopterygii
- Order: Siluriformes
- Family: Sisoridae
- Genus: Glyptothorax
- Species: G. cavia

Binomial name
- Glyptothorax cavia (Hamilton, 1822)

Synonyms
- Glyptothorax burmanicus (non Prashad & Mukerji, 1929); Glyptothorax lineatus (Day, 1877); Euglyptosternum lineatum Day, 1877; Bagarius cavia (Hamilton, 1822); Glyptosternum cavia (Hamilton, 1822); Pimelodus cavia Hamilton, 1822

= Glyptothorax cavia =

Species of fish

Glyptothorax cavia is a species of catfish that was first described by Hamilton 1822. Glyptothorax cavia is a species in genus Glyptothorax, family Sisoridae and order Siluriformes. IUCN categorise the species as least concern globally. No subspecies are listed in Catalogue of Life.

The species can grow up to 18" in TL. It is found in the Himalayan region and adjoining area in medium to large streams and rivers.
