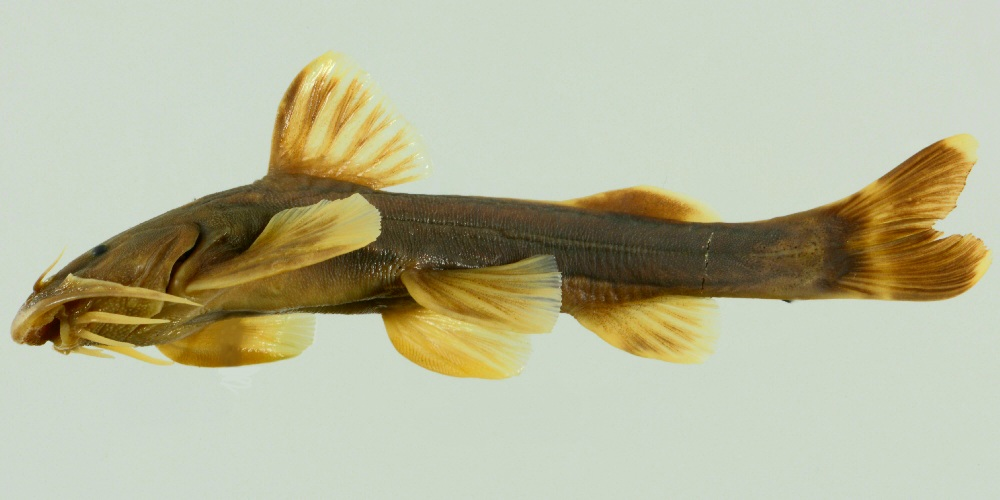

Conservation status
- Least Concern (IUCN 3.1)

Scientific classification
- Kingdom: Animalia
- Phylum: Chordata
- Class: Actinopterygii
- Order: Siluriformes
- Family: Sisoridae
- Genus: Glyptothorax
- Species: G. pectinopterus

Binomial name
- Glyptothorax pectinopterus McClelland, 1842

Synonyms
- Glyptosternon pectinopterus McClelland, 1842; Glyptosternum pectinopterum McClelland, 1842; Glyptothorax pectinipterus (McClelland, 1842)

= Glyptothorax pectinopterus =

Species of fish

Glyptothorax pectinopterus is a species of catfish in the genus Glyptothorax that is native to the regions of Asia. It has been found in countries including Pakistan, India, Nepal, and Myanmar. With an average length of up to 17.8 cm (7.0 in), these small species are more likely to reside in the pool and run areas of streams, where they thrive in benthic habitats with stony substrates. Their biological niche includes both the benthic and pelagic realms, with a preference for bottom and midwater habitats, often among rapidly flowing rapids.
