= Glyptothorax callopterus =

Conservation status
- Least Concern (IUCN 3.1)

Scientific classification
- Kingdom: Animalia
- Phylum: Chordata
- Class: Actinopterygii
- Order: Siluriformes
- Family: Sisoridae
- Genus: Glyptothorax
- Species: G. callopterus

Binomial name
- Glyptothorax callopterus Smith, 1945

Species of fish

Glyptothorax callopterus is a species of catfish that was first described by Hugh McCormick Smith in 1945. Glyptothorax callopterus is a species in genus Glyptothorax, family Sisoridae and order Siluriformes. IUCN categorise the species as least concern globally. No subspecies are listed in Catalogue of Life.
