= Glyptothorax ater =

Conservation status
- Data Deficient (IUCN 3.1)

Scientific classification
- Kingdom: Animalia
- Phylum: Chordata
- Class: Actinopterygii
- Order: Siluriformes
- Family: Sisoridae
- Genus: Glyptothorax
- Species: G. ater

Binomial name
- Glyptothorax ater Anganthoibi & Vishwanath, 2011

Species of fish

Glyptothorax ater is a species of catfish that was first described by Anganthoibi and Vishwanath in 2011. Glyptothorax ater is a species in genus Glyptothorax, family Sisoridae and order Siluriformes. No subspecies are listed in Catalogue of Life.

The species is found in the Kaladan River basin in Mizoram State, India.
