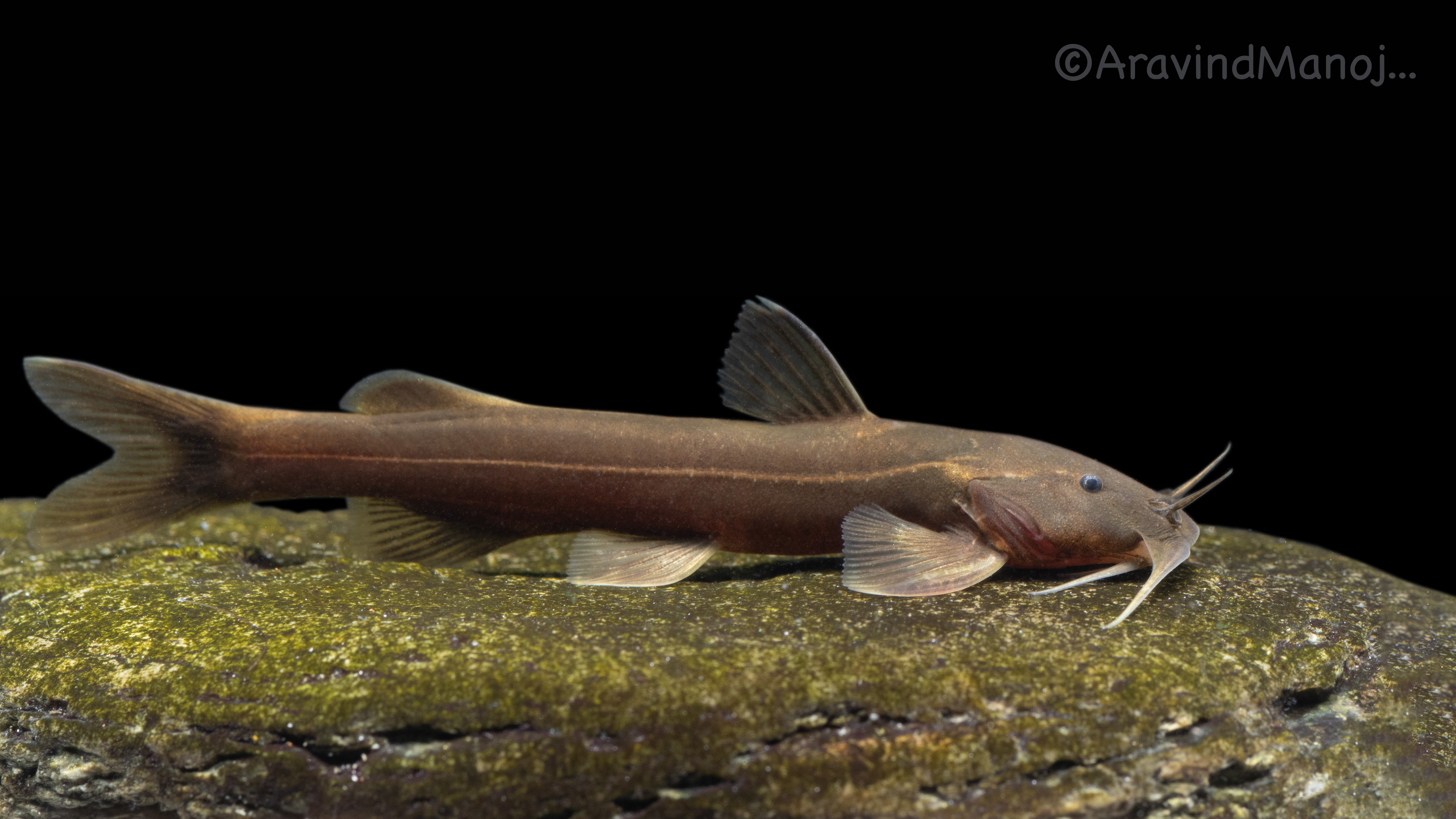

Conservation status
- Least Concern (IUCN 3.1)

Scientific classification
- Kingdom: Animalia
- Phylum: Chordata
- Class: Actinopterygii
- Order: Siluriformes
- Family: Sisoridae
- Genus: Glyptothorax
- Species: G. annandalei

Binomial name
- Glyptothorax annandalei Hora, 1923

= Glyptothorax annandalei =

Species of fish

Glyptothorax annandalei is a species of catfish in the family Sisoridae. It was first described by Indian ichthyologist Sunder Lal Hora in 1923. The IUCN categorises the species as least concern globally.
