= Kali river disappearances =

Reported fatal fish attacks in India

The Kāli River goonch attacks were a series of fatal attacks on humans believed to be perpetrated by a goonch weighing 90 kilograms (200 lb) in three villages on the banks of the Kāli River in India and Nepal, between 1998 and 2007. Investigations completed by Jeremy Wade on River Monsters and Rick Rosenthal independently, concluded that due to the absence of the bull sharks in the area of the disappearances, it was a possibility that large goonch catfish were responsible. This has still not been officially verified to date.

== Attacks ==
The first attack occurred in April 1998, when at 13:00, 17-year-old Dil Bahadur, while swimming in the river, was dragged underwater whilst swimming. No remains were found, even after a three-day search spanning 5 kilometers (3.11 miles). Three months later, a young boy was pulled underwater in front of his father. A body was never recovered. Another attack occurred in 2007 when an 18-year-old Nepalese man disappeared below the river surface whilst swimming with a friend. An eyewitness described seeing an "enormous head" similar to an "elongated pig".

== Investigation ==
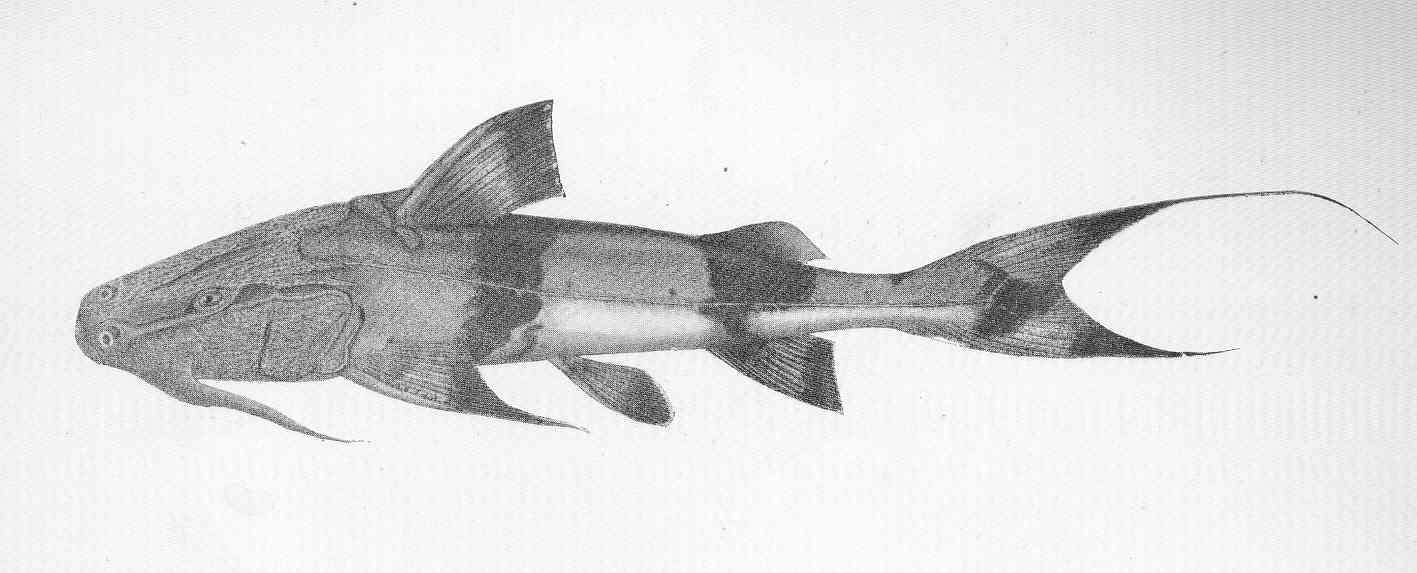
Diagram of Bagarius yarrelli.

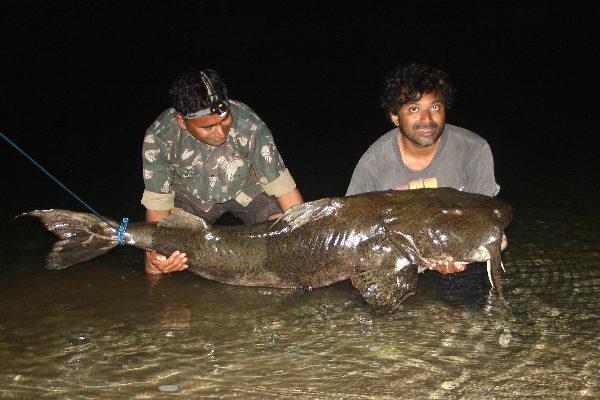
Giant Bagarius yarrelli (goonch) caught in India.

British biologist Jeremy Wade volunteered to capture the perpetrator. Though originally skeptical of the truth behind the attacks, he later became intrigued because the attacks only occurred in a specific area spanning 6.4 kilometres (4 mi). He was told by the villagers that the creature likely developed a taste for human flesh and had grown large after eating half-burnt human remains discarded from funeral pyres on the river banks. After examining the water where Bahadur had disappeared with a depth sounder, Wade discounted the possibility of the boy having been dragged by a whirlpool, as the attacks all occurred in areas without turbulence. Later, one kilometre (0.62 mi) away, a domestic water buffalo was reportedly dragged underwater by a strange animal while drinking in water only one metre (3 ft 3 in) deep. Wade theorised that the creature would have had to weigh 91–136 kilograms (200–300 lb) in order to do so. A buffalo weighs 300–400 kilograms (660–880 lb), according to the film.

All three species of crocodile possible in the area were dismissed: saltwater crocodiles are not known to travel so far inland; the jaw structure of gharials prevents them from killing humans or buffalo; and mugger crocodiles do not inhabit the cold torrents of the Kāli River due to the habitat incompatibility. Bull sharks were initially considered, however an underwater investigation by marine biologist Rick Rosenthal in the area where the buffalo disappeared yielded no sightings of bull sharks. Moreover, Wade believed that bull sharks would not have lived so far upriver, and there had been no sightings of dorsal fins breaking the water's surface. However, during the underwater investigation, a 1-metre (3 ft 3 in) goonch catfish was sighted, which Wade unsuccessfully tried to capture. Later underwater investigations yielded numerous group sightings of goonch, six of which were man-sized. After an unsuccessful attempt was made at capturing one with a fishing rod, a funeral pyre was set up in order to lure one in. A record-breaking 1.7-metre (5 ft 7 in), goonch was captured the day after, and was weighed at 73 kilograms (161 lb), three times the weight of an average goonch. Although Wade estimated that the fish was strong and large enough to eat a small child, he stated in an interview that he believed that larger specimens were likely to exist, and that the specimen he captured was not large enough to be the alleged maneater, on the basis of the sizes of the victims.

These events were shown on his program River Monsters.

== Further material ==
- Wade, Jeremy (2011). River Monsters: True Stories of the Ones That Didn't Get Away. Da Capo Press. p. 309. ISBN 978-0306820816.
