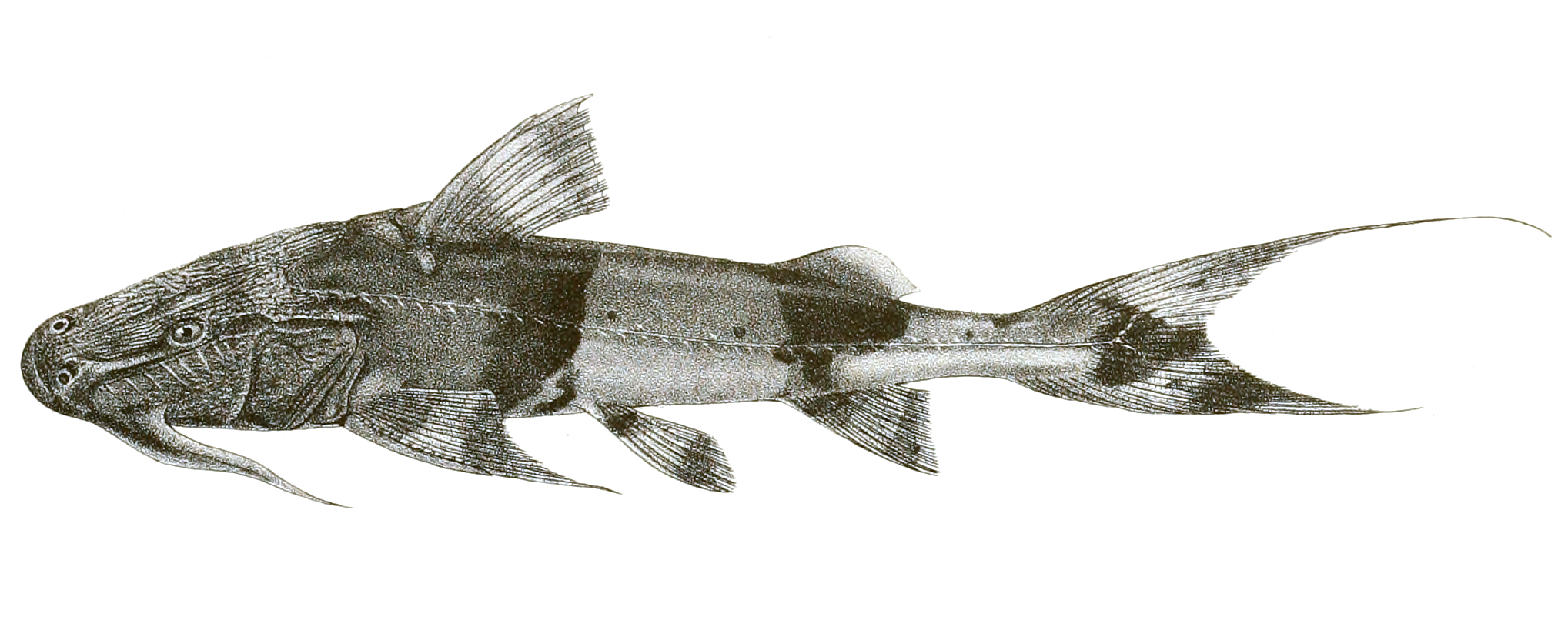

Conservation status
- Vulnerable (IUCN 3.1)

Scientific classification
- Kingdom: Animalia
- Phylum: Chordata
- Class: Actinopterygii
- Division: Teleostei
- Order: Siluriformes
- Family: Sisoridae
- Genus: Bagarius
- Species: B. yarrelli

Binomial name
- Bagarius yarrelli (Sykes, 1839)

Synonyms
- Pimelodus yarrelli Sykes, 1839

= Bagarius yarrelli =

Species of fish

Bagarius yarrelli, also known as the goonch catfish, giant devil catfish, or simply goonch, is a very large species of catfish in the genus Bagarius found in rivers in the Indian subcontinent. The species reaches up to 2 m (6.6 ft) in length. It may be synonymous with B. bagarius.

== Etymology ==
The species is known by many names throughout its range in the Indian subcontinent. It is known as the goonch in Urdu, Hindi and Punjabi, baghar or baghair in Bengali and Bihari (these names being the origin of the genus name Bagarius), gauns in Rajasthani, gorua (গৰুৱা) and baghmas (বাঘমাছ) in Assamese and bodh in Chhattisgarhi. Its scientific name commemorates the English naturalist William Yarrell.

== Taxonomy ==
The species is frequently taxonomically confused with B. bagarius. B. bagarius has, perhaps in error, been reported as reaching the same size as B. yarrelli, while others consider B. bagarius to be a dwarf species that only reaches about 20 cm (7.9 in). A study published in 2021 found B. yarrelli to be a junior synonym of B. bagarius, likely necessitating a merge of B. yarrelli into B. bagarius.

== Distribution and habitat ==
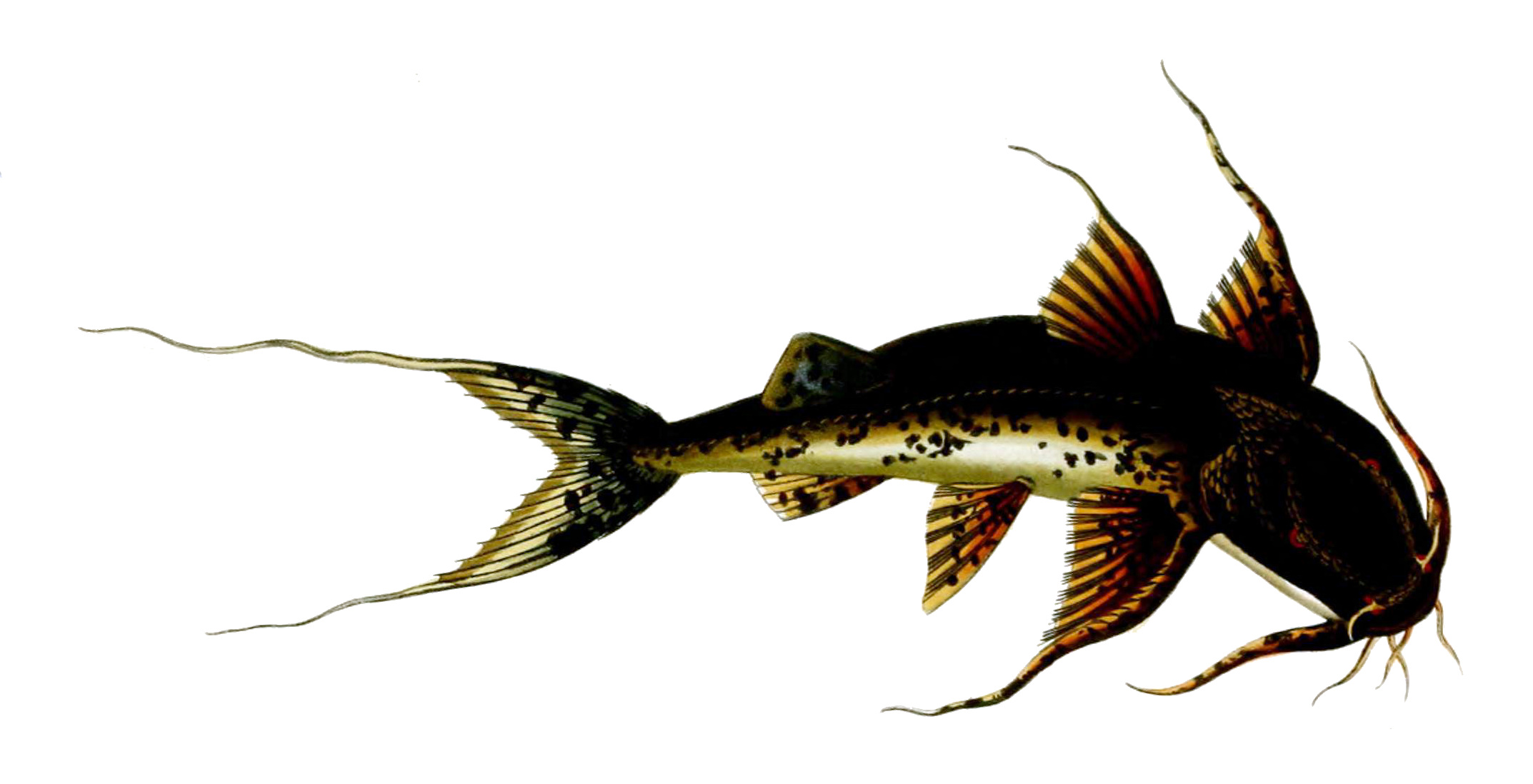

It is found in large rivers in South Asia, such as the Indus and Ganges basins. It is more common in deeper pools near faster current, but never in small streams. Two other populations were also formerly thought to exist in Southeast Asia (one population in the Mekong-Chao Phraya basin and the other from the Xe Bang Fai of Laos and south to Indonesia), but a 2021 study found the former to represent a new species B. vegrandis, and the latter to represent the distinct species B. lica, previously synonymized with B. yarrelli.

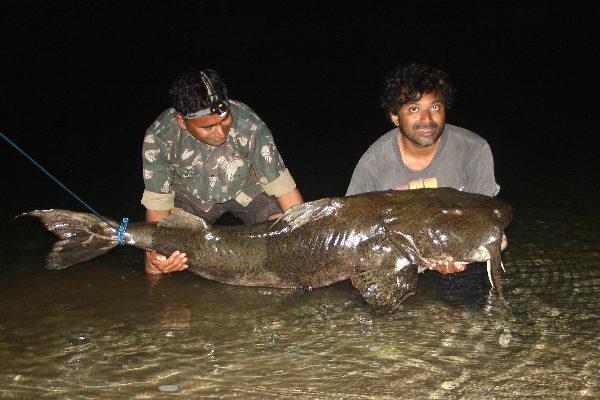
Giant Bagarius yarrelli (goonch) caught in India.

== Threats ==
While still abundant, the species is considered vulnerable on the IUCN Red List due to excessive, unsustainable overharvesting of the species. Hydroelectric projects such as those on the Indravati River may affect the habitat of the species and adversely impact it.

== Cultural significance ==
The Order of the Fish was the highest honour of the Mughal Empire and named after this fish.

In Chhattisgarh, the species is worshipped by tribal communities such as the Murias and Gonds, and is popularly referred to as the "shark of the Bastar". There have been efforts to name it the official state fish of Chhattisgarh.

== In captivity ==
Bagarius yarrelli has seldom been kept successfully in a home aquarium setting. Some aquarists have attempted to house this species in home aquaria to varying degrees of success. Unlike some other larger catfish species such as the sun catfish or pictus catfish, goonch catfish will quickly outgrow even the largest systems, and are far more suited for an outdoor tropical pond setting or the largest of public aquaria displays. Despite this, juveniles are sometimes seen for sale at much smaller sizes around 4" - 6" in length to unsuspecting buyers. They are also a very aggressive species in the presence of most other fish, exhibiting territorial aggression and possessing two rows of larger, sharp, pointed teeth making them unsuitable for virtually any tankmates.

== See also ==
- Kali River goonch attacks
