= Jeremy Wade =

British television presenter and author (born 1956)

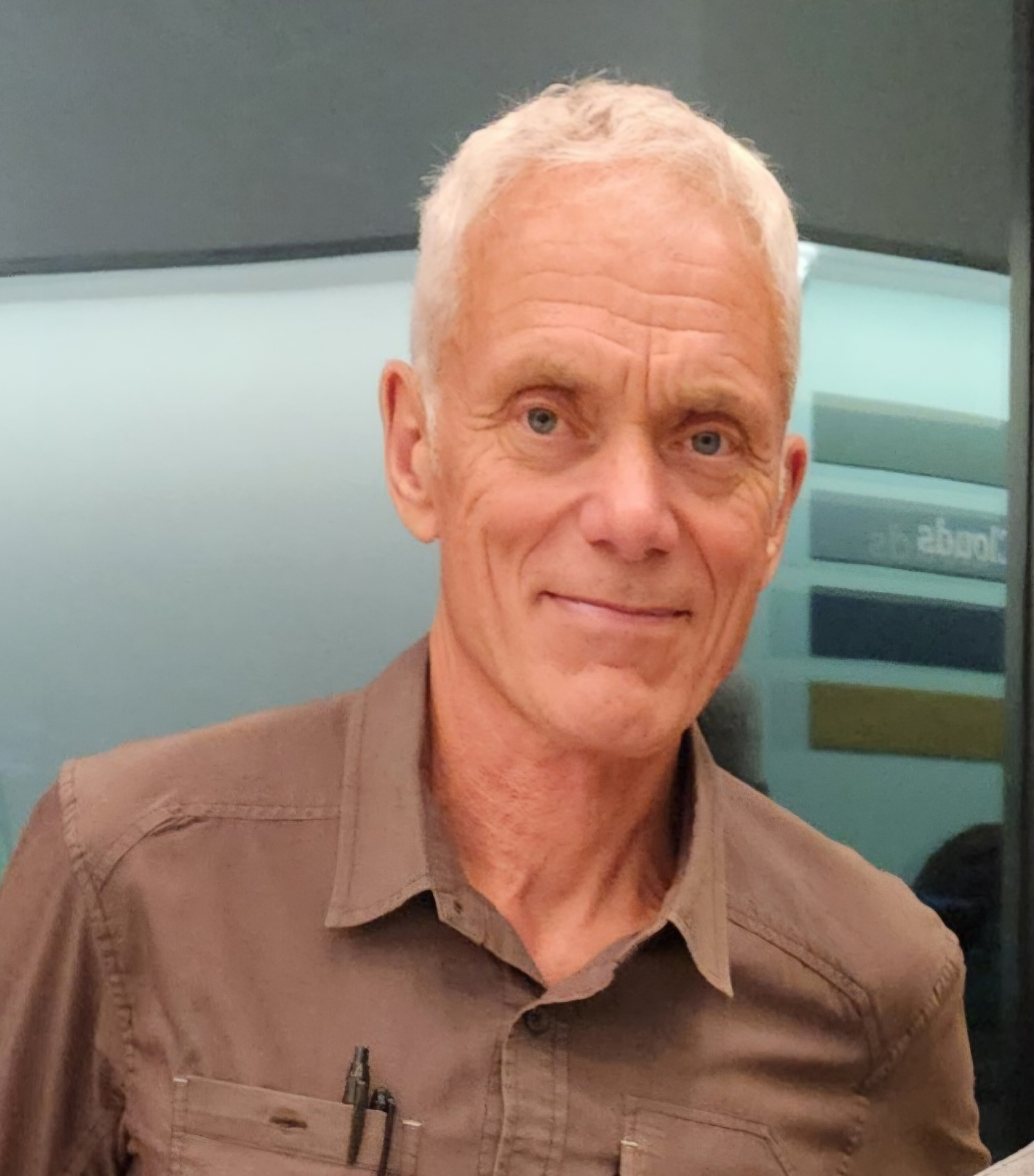
- Wade in 2025
- Born: Jeremy John Wade; 23 March 1956 (age 70); Ipswich, Suffolk, England
- Education: University of Bristol; University of Kent
- Occupations: Television presenter, author, zoologist, adventurer, angler
- Website: www.jeremywade.co.uk

Jeremy John Wade (born 23 March 1956) is a British television presenter, biologist, angler, adventurer and author. He is known for his wildlife documentary television series River Monsters (2009-2017) as well as Mighty Rivers and Dark Waters.

== Early life ==
Jeremy Wade was born in Ipswich and brought up in Nayland where his father was a vicar. He attended Dean Close School and has a degree in zoology from Bristol University and a postgraduate teaching certificate in biological sciences from the University of Kent. He previously worked as a secondary school biology teacher in Kent.

== Career ==
At a young age, Jeremy Wade became interested in fishing; he began as a child when he was living in East Anglia, on the banks of Suffolk's River Stour. "The village where I grew up had a river flowing through it. So it was inevitable, I think, that I should be drawn to it in the same way that people born in sight of Alpine peaks become climbers. My first attempts to catch fish, age seven or eight, were unsuccessful, but then I had some guidance from a school friend and after my first catch I never looked back. My parents were happy for me to stay out all day and a big part of my fishing was wanting to find new places, a process that has continued to this day."

In 1982, Wade made his first overseas trip, to India's mountain rivers. Recalling this journey, Wade stated that trip was very hard going. "I took just £200 ($265.62 USD) to last me three months but I managed to catch some fish such as Himalayan mahseer up to 18 pounds". Upon his return to England, Wade wrote a couple of articles about his experiences in India for a fishing magazine. "Despite the discomfort of travelling at such a basic level, there was a real feeling of achievement and I immediately started saving money to go somewhere else. I wasn't sure where at that point but I knew there must be other exotic fish out there, although probably not as well documented as Mahseer, but possibly even more spectacular."

It was during another journey to India in 2005 in the Himalayan foothills that the concept for the television series River Monsters first presented itself. Upon hearing of stories from locals that some people had gone missing in the river, Wade began investigating. "Locals believed the perpetrator was a giant fish. It had the potential for a fascinating TV show--not just for people interested in fish and fishing, but for everyone." The fish turned out to be the Goonch catfish, with Wade landing a 161-pound specimen in an epic battle for the episode. He has taken many trips to the Congo and Amazon rainforests. With the aid of local fishermen, Wade travels the world to catch various fish. Wade published his first book, Somewhere Down the Crazy River, with joint-author Paul Boote, in 1992. Wade has also written River Monsters (2011), which details his hunts and journeys around the world, and How to Think Like a Fish (2019), which combines Wade's past experiences with his ruminations on life.

Jeremy Wade made his acting debut in the 1986 Bollywood film Allah Rakha playing an extra; he would later return to film in the 2014 film, Blood Lake: Attack of the Killer Lampreys, playing a lamprey expert. He had previously covered the fish in the River Monsters episode "Vampires of the Deep".

When the River Monsters episode "Deep Sea Demons" aired in 2016, Wade officially became known as one of the very few people in history to witness a live, healthy oarfish.

In 2016, while filming on a remote island near Australia, Wade and his crew stumbled upon a man who had become stranded on the island after losing his boat while digging for oysters. The man, identified as Tremaine, had been stranded on the island for two days before Wade and his crew found him. Part of this incident was aired during the River Monsters episode "Death Down Under" (48th episode of the series), but after Wade's crew rehydrated the man, one crew member took the man for medical care while Wade and the rest of the crew continued their investigation.

In 2018, Wade was recruited to host the Animal Planet documentary series Mighty Rivers, in which he investigates the disappearance of freshwater giants from the world's most iconic rivers. In 2019, Wade would go on to the Animal Planet documentary series Dark Waters, which explored unexplained sightings of mythical beasts across the world. In 2020, he began a new TV series, Mysteries of the Deep, where he explores underwater mysteries, ranging from the Loch Ness Monster to the Bermuda Triangle.

== Personal life ==
At various times during his journeys abroad, he has caught malaria, been threatened at gunpoint, and survived a plane crash. He is fluent in Portuguese, which he studied during the many years he spent fishing in Brazil, and also speaks French, Spanish, and some Mandarin.

== Filmography ==
Film appearances of Jeremy Wade
1986	Allah Rakha	Acting debut, extra
2007	Jungle Hooks	
2009–2017	River Monsters	
2011	River Monsters: The Lost Reels	
2014	Blood Lake: Attack of the Killer Lampreys	Lamprey Expert
2018	Celebrating World Fish Migration Day 2018	Short film, host
2018	Mighty Rivers	
2019	Dark Waters	
2020	Expedition Unknown	Season 8, Episode 116
2020–2022	Mysteries of the Deep	
2021	Unknown Waters with Jeremy Wade	

== Publications ==
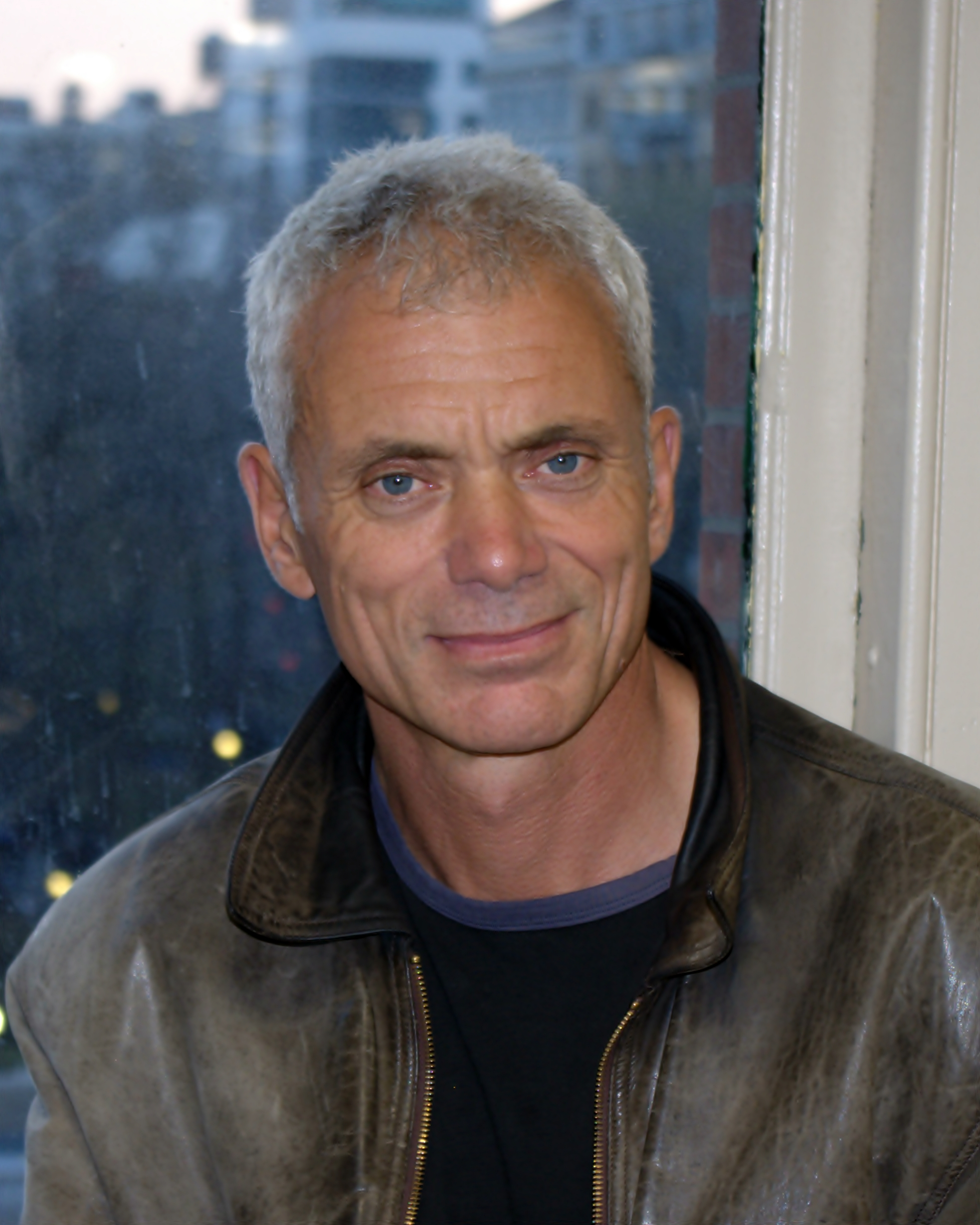
Jeremy Wade promoting his book River Monster: True Stories of the One That Didn't Get Away at Barnes & Nobles Union Square, New York, 2011.

- Boote P and Wade J (1994) Somewhere Down the Crazy River

Coronet. ISBN 9780340603215 – classic angling book.

- Wade, Jeremy (2011) River Monsters: True Stories of the Ones that Didn't Get Away Da Capo Press. ISBN 9780306819544.
- Wade, Jeremy (2019) How to Think Like a Fish: And Other Lessons from a Lifetime in Angling. ISBN 978-0306845314.
