= Trung Sơn Dam =

- Location within Vietnam
- Country: Vietnam
- Location: Trung Sơn commune, Quan Hóa District, Thanh Hóa Province
- Coordinates: 20°36′32″N 104°50′13″E
- Status: Operational
- Construction began: 2012
- Opening date: 2016
- Construction cost: US$410.68 million
- Owner: Vietnam Electricity

Dam and spillways
- Impounds: Ma River
- Height: 84.5 m (277 ft)
- Length: 513 m (1,683 ft)
- Width (crest): 8 m (26 ft)

Reservoir
- Total capacity: 348.5×10^{6} m^{3} (282,500 acre⋅ft)
- Catchment area: 14,660 km^{2} (5,660 sq mi)
- Surface area: 13.13 km^{2} (5.07 sq mi)
- Maximum water depth: 160 m (520 ft)

Power Station
- Commission date: September 2017
- Turbines: 4 X 65 MW Francis turbines
- Installed capacity: 260 MW
- Annual generation: 1,018 GWh

The Trung Sơn Dam (Dự Án Nhà máy Thủy điện Trung Sơn) is a hydroelectric power station on the Ma River in northwestern Vietnam. Located in the Trung Sơn commune, Quan Hóa District, Thanh Hóa Province, it is approximately 95 kilometres (59 mi) southwest of Hòa Bình city, and 195 kilometres (121 mi) northwest of Thanh Hóa city. The dam created a reservoir which covers a large area of the Mường Lát and Quan Hóa Districts in the Thanh Hoa province as well as part of the Mộc Châu in Sơn La Province. It is approximately 9.5 kilometres (5.9 mi) from the Vietnam–Laos border. The 260 MW associated power plant became fully operational in September 2017.

== The Project ==
The Trung Sơn hydropower project is owned by Trung Sơn Hydropower Company Limited (TSHPCo), the entity established by Vietnam Electricity (EVN) in Decision No. 106/QD-ENV dated March 17, 2011. TSHPCo is responsible for the management, construction and operation of the Trung Sơn hydropower project.

The project provides both power generation and flood control. The powerhouse is designed to contain four generating units with a total capacity of 260 MW and an annual output of 1,018.61 GWh,, a significant addition to the national grid. The flood control storage of 112 million cubic metres (4.0×10^{9} cu ft) will help prevent floods downstream.

The project cost a total of VND 7,775,146 million (equivalent to US $410.68 million). This includes US $330 million from a World Bank loan, which was signed by the Socialist Republic of Vietnam and the World Bank on June 28, 2011. Additionally, the project was given slightly over US $80 million from the counterpart fund of (EVN).

The project has created social, environmental and community relation programs to mitigate anticipated and unanticipated issues with populations either directly or indirectly impacted, the Resettlement, Livelihoods and Ethnic Minorities Development Program (RLDP). These populations consist of approximately 10,600 people (2,327 households), of which 7,012 (1,516 households) will be directly impacted in the main project area, resulting in a total of 533 households having to be resettled. The RLDP includes a Resettlement Plan (RP), a Community Livelihoods Improvement Plan (CLIP) and an Ethnic Minorities Development Plan (EMDP).

In addition, management has prepared a Supplementary Environmental and Social Impact Assessment (SESIA) with Environmental Management Plan (EMP) for the project. This plan includes principles, approaches, procedures and methods to be used to control and minimize environmental impacts of all project-related construction and operation activities. Compared with fossil-fuel based energy plants of the same size, the dam produces far less greenhouse gas emissions (GHGs). TSHPCo maintains a website at www.trungsonhp.vn where public information is routinely updated.

== Main parameters ==
- Catchment basin area: 14,660 square kilometres (5,660 sq mi)
- Reservoir volume: 348.5 million cubic metres (12.31×10^{9} cu ft)
- Reservoir area when at full capacity: 13.13 square kilometres (5.07 sq mi)
- Full capacity water level: 160 metres (520 ft)
- Minimum operating water level: 150 metres (490 ft)
- Maximum flood control storage: 150 million cubic metres (5.3×10^{9} cu ft)
- Regular flood control storage: 112 million cubic metres (4.0×10^{9} cu ft)
- Installed electrical capacity : 260 MW
- Annual electrical output: 1,018.61 GWh
- Dam crest length: 513 metres (1,683 ft)
- Dam width at the top: 8 metres (26 ft)
- Dam height: 84.5 metres (277 ft)
- A power plant containing four 65 MW Francis turbines (total installed capacity of 260 MW), each designed for a maximum water head of 72.02 metres (236.3 ft)
- A 65-kilometer, 220-kV transmission line connecting to the national grid
- A 20.4-km access road

== Components ==
The project is composed of four components:

- Dam and Ancillary Construction: (i) Dam and ancillary works; (ii) Access road and bridges; (ii) Temporary transmission line to supply power for construction; and (iv) Project management
- Permanent power transmission line: 220 kV double-circuit line to connect to the national grid in the Tan Lac district
- Social and environment impact mitigation concerns: (i) Resettlement; (ii) Livelihoods and ethnic minorities development; (iii) Public health support; and (iv) Environmental management
- Capacity development and scale-up: Support to bring hydropower projects up to international standards

== Allocation of World Bank US$ 330 million loan ==
Category	Amount of the Loan allocated (US$)	Percentage of Expenditure to be financed (including tax)
(1) Eligible expenditures under Component 1 and component 3 of the project	302,225,000	100%
(2) Eligible expenditures under component 2 of the project	23,950,000	100%
(3) Eligible expenditures under component 4 of the project	3,000,000	100%
(4) Front-end fee	825,000	Pursuant to Section 2.03 of the Agreement in accordance with Section 2.07 (b) of the General Conditions
Total	330,000,000	

== Key milestones ==
- Commencement of main civil works: November 2012
- River diversion: Quarter 4, 2013
- Impoundment: October 2016
- Operation of Unit No. 1: Quarter 4, 2016
- Operation of Unit No. 4: Quarter 2, 2017
