= Glyptothorax silviae =

Scientific classification
- Kingdom: Animalia
- Phylum: Chordata
- Class: Actinopterygii
- Order: Siluriformes
- Family: Sisoridae
- Genus: Glyptothorax
- Species: G. silviae

Binomial name
- Glyptothorax silviae Coad, 1981

Species of fish

Glyptothorax silviae is a species of catfish in genus Glyptothorax, family Sisoridae and order Siluriformes. It is a Freshwater, benthopelagic, Subtropical fish endemic to the Shatt al-Arab and Karun rivers in Iran and Tigris in Iraq.

== Sources ==
- Coad, B.W., 1998. Systematic biodiversity in the freshwater fishes of Iran. Ital. J. Zool. 65:101-108. (Ref. 31728)
