= Glyptothorax armeniacus =

Conservation status
- Data Deficient (IUCN 3.1)

Scientific classification
- Kingdom: Animalia
- Phylum: Chordata
- Class: Actinopterygii
- Order: Siluriformes
- Family: Sisoridae
- Genus: Glyptothorax
- Species: G. armeniacus

Binomial name
- Glyptothorax armeniacus (Berg, 1918)

Synonyms
- Glyptosternum armeniacum Berg, 1918

Species of fish

Glyptothorax armeniacus, the Armenian mountain catfish, is a species of catfish that was first described by Berg, 1918. Glyptothorax armeniacus is a species in genus Glyptothorax, family Sisoridae and order Siluriformes. No subspecies are listed in Catalogue of Life. It is endemic to southern and eastern Turkey.
