= Glyptothorax burmanicus =

Conservation status
- Least Concern (IUCN 3.1)

Scientific classification
- Kingdom: Animalia
- Phylum: Chordata
- Class: Actinopterygii
- Order: Siluriformes
- Family: Sisoridae
- Genus: Glyptothorax
- Species: G. burmanicus

Binomial name
- Glyptothorax burmanicus Prashad & Mukerji, 1929

Species of fish

Glyptothorax burmanicus is a species of fish in the family Sisoridae.

The species lives in the Irrawaddy and Salween Rivers in Myanmar and neighbouring countries.
