= Bagarius vegrandis =

Conservation status
- Least Concern (IUCN 3.1)

Scientific classification
- Kingdom: Animalia
- Phylum: Chordata
- Class: Actinopterygii
- Order: Siluriformes
- Family: Sisoridae
- Genus: Bagarius
- Species: B. vegrandis

Binomial name
- Bagarius vegrandis Ng & Kottelat, 2021

Species of catfish

Bagarius vegrandis, the dwarf goonch, is a species of sisorid catfish native to the Mekong River drainages in Laos, Cambodia and Thailand, Vietnam and the Chao Phraya river basins in Thailand. This species reaches a maximum length of 20 to 22 cm (7.9 to 8.7 in)

== Aquarium ==
Bagarius vegrandis is the only member of the genus even marginally suitable for home aquaria. It requires cool, fast-flowing water, and eats bloodworms, shrimp and live or dead fish. Reports exist of very anti-social behaviour by these fish in captivity.
