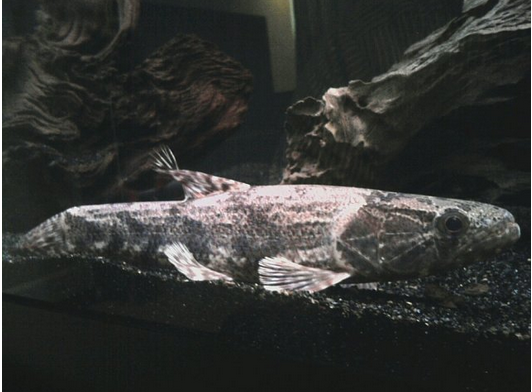

Conservation status
- Least Concern (IUCN 3.1)

Scientific classification
- Kingdom: Animalia
- Phylum: Chordata
- Class: Actinopterygii
- Order: Characiformes
- Family: Erythrinidae
- Genus: Hoplias
- Species: H. australis

Binomial name
- Hoplias australis Oyakawa & Mattox, 2009

= Hoplias australis =

Species of fish

Hoplias australis is a species of freshwater ray-finned fish belonging to the family Erythrinidae, the trahiras. This species is found in South America.

== Taxonomy ==
Hoplias australis was first formally described in 2009 by the Brazilian ichthyologists Osvaldo Takeshi Oyakawa and George Mendes Taliaferro Mattox with its type locality given as Rio das Antas, rio do Ouro drainage, on Formosa do Sul-Irati road, Formosa do Sul at 26°38'55"S, 52°48'05"W in the Uruguay River basin in Santa Catarina State, Brazil. This species is a member of the H. lacerdae species complex , H. lacerdae was revised from a species to a species complex which consisted of 5 species; H. brasiliensis, H. curupira, H. intermedius, H. lacerdae and this species. The genus Hoplias is classified in the family Erythrinidae which is within the suborder Characoidei of the order Characiformes.

== Etymology ==
Hoplias australis is a species within the genus Hoplias, a word derived from the Greek hoplon, which means "shield" or "armour", an allusion to the armour created by the enlarged cranial bones and large teeth of these fishes. The specific name, australis, means "southern", a reference to this fish being one of the southernmost species in the genus Hoplias.

== Description ==
Hoplias australis has its dorsal fin supported by between 12 and 14 soft rays while the anal fin has between 9 and 11 soft rays. There is a laterosensory canal along the lower surface of the dentary which consistently has 5 pores. The anterior profile of the head is rounded when viewed from the side. There are between 40 and 45 scales in the lateral line. The body of this fish is elongated in shape. This species has reaches a standard length of 44 cm (17 in).

== Distribution and habitat ==
Hoplias australis is found in the southern part of South America in the Uruguay River system and its tributary the Rio Negro in Corrientes and Misiones provinces of Argentina, Santa Catarina State in Brazil and in Uruguay. little is known about its ecology and behaviour.
