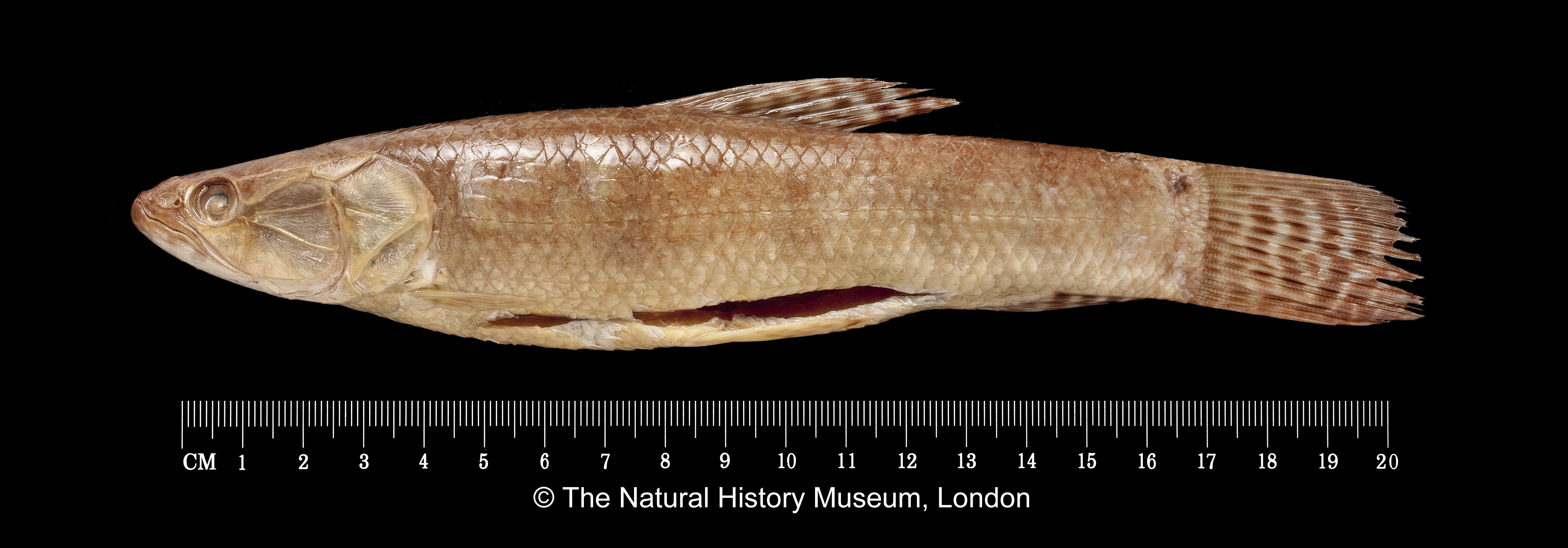
- Paralectotype at the Natural History Museum, London.
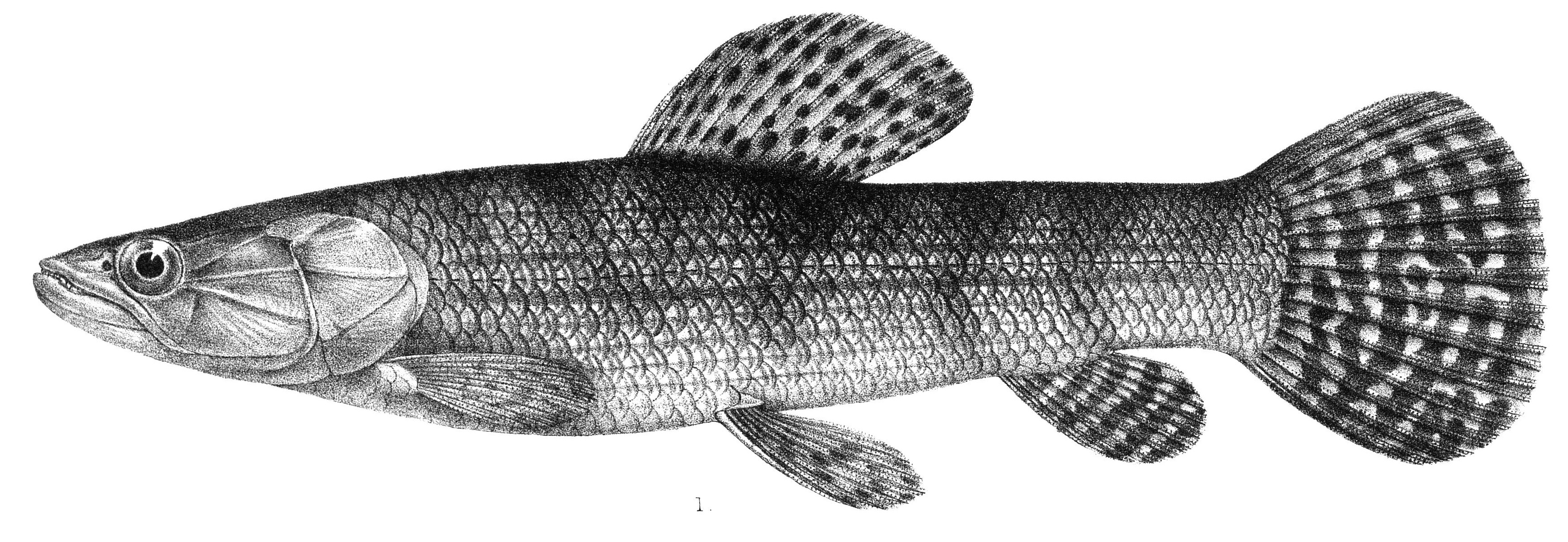
- Illustration from Biologia Centrali-Americana.

Conservation status
- Least Concern (IUCN 3.1)

Scientific classification
- Kingdom: Animalia
- Phylum: Chordata
- Class: Actinopterygii
- Division: Teleostei
- Order: Characiformes
- Family: Erythrinidae
- Genus: Hoplias
- Species: H. microlepis

Binomial name
- Hoplias microlepis (Günther, 1864)

Synonyms
- Macrodon microlepis Günther, 1864

= Hoplias microlepis =

Species of fish

Hoplias microlepis, the smallscale wolffish, is a species of freshwater ray-finned fish belonging to the family Erythrinidae, the trahiras. This species is found in northwestern South America and in southern Central America.

== Taxonomy ==
Hoplias microlepis was first formally described as Macrodon microlepis in 1864 by the German-born British herpetologist and ichthyologist Albert Günther with its type locality given as Rio Chagres in Panama. This species is a member of the H. malabaricus species group. The genus Hoplias is classified in the family Erythrinidae which is within the suborder Characoidei of the order Characiformes.

== Etymology ==
Hoplias microlepis is a species within the genus Hoplias, a word derived from the Greek hoplon, which means "shield" or "armour", an allusion to the armour created by the enlarged cranial bones and large teeth of these fishes. The specific name, microlepis, means "small scaled", a reference to smaller scales arranged in longitudinal series along back of this fish compared with those on Macrodon trahira and H. intermedius.

== Description ==
Hoplias microlepis as a member of the H. malabaricus group, differs from species in the H. macropthalmus and H. lacerdae groups by having dentary bones which abruptly converge towards the symphysis of the mandibles and by having tooth plates on tongue. The other species groups have dentary bones which are parallel and only gently converge as they approach the symphysis of the mandibles and do not have tooth plates on tongue. It can be told apart from the other members of the H. malabaricus species group by having a count of between 22 and 24 scales around the caudal peduncle while the other species in the group have between 18 and 20, typically 20. The body has an elongated shape with a maximum standard length of 36 cm (14 in).

== Distribution and habitat ==
Hoplias microlepis is found in the Pacific slope drainages of southern Central America and northwestern South America. It occurs from the Coto Brus River in Costa Rica south to the Tumbes River in Ecuador and Peru, although its presence in Colombia is uncertain and it may be being misidentified for H. malabaricus in that country. There are records from the Atlantic slope of Panama which may represent migration along the Panama Canal. It is found in freshwater occurring in rivers and impoundments.
