= Hoplerythrinus cinereus =

Conservation status
- Data Deficient (IUCN 3.1)

Scientific classification
- Kingdom: Animalia
- Phylum: Chordata
- Class: Actinopterygii
- Division: Teleostei
- Order: Characiformes
- Family: Erythrinidae
- Genus: Hoplerythrinus
- Species: H. cinereus

Binomial name
- Hoplerythrinus cinereus (Gill, 1858)

Synonyms
- Erythrinus cinereus Gill, 1858

Species of fish

Hoplerythrinus cinereus, the yarrow or yellowhead wolffish, is a species of freshwater ray-finned fish belonging to the family Erythrinidae, the trahiras. This species is endemic to the western drainage sistems on the island of Trinidad in Trinidad and Tobago, but is of uncertain taxonomic status.

== Taxonomy ==
Hoplerythrinus cinereus was first formally described as Erythrinus cinereus in 1858 by the American biologist Theodore Gill, with its type locality given as "Trinidad Island, West Indies". It was listed as a valid species of Erythrinus by Osvaldo Takeshi Oyakawa in 2003. However, the International Union for Conservation of Nature classify H. cinereus as data deficient because they regard it as insufficiently studied to demonstrate that it is not a junior synonym of H. unitaeniatus. This taxon is classified within the genus Hoplerythrinus in the family Erythrinidae, which is within the suborder Characoidei of the order Characiformes.

== Etymology ==
Hoplerythrinus cinereus is a member of the genus Hoplerythrinus. This name combines the Greek hoplon, meaning "shield" or "armour", a reference to the infraorbital bones being large and covering the cheeks, with the genus name Erythrinus. These enlarged infraorbital bones are not unique to this genus, and all trahiras have them. The specific name cinereus means "ashy", i.e. grey, an allusion to the colour of this fish.

== Distribution and habitat ==
Hoplerythrinus cinereus, if it is a valid species, is endemic to river catchments of the western part of the island of Trinidad in Trinidad and Tobago.
