= Hoplias brasiliensis =

Conservation status
- Least Concern (IUCN 3.1)

Scientific classification
- Kingdom: Animalia
- Phylum: Chordata
- Class: Actinopterygii
- Division: Teleostei
- Order: Characiformes
- Family: Erythrinidae
- Genus: Hoplias
- Species: H. brasiliensis

Binomial name
- Hoplias brasiliensis (Spix & Agassiz, 1829)

Synonyms
- Erythrinus brasiliensis Spix & Agassiz, 1829

Species of fish

Hoplias brasiliensis, the Brazilian wolffish, is a species of freshwater ray-finned fish belonging to the family Erythrinidae, the trahiras. This species is endemic to northeastern Brazil.

== Taxonomy ==
Hoplias brasiliensis was first formally described as Erythrinus brasiliensis in 1829, the type locality was given as the Rio Peruaguaçu near Iaçu in Bahia State, Brazil, where the German biologist Johann Baptist von Spix collected the type, with the description being completed and published by the Swiss-American biologist Louis Agassiz. This species is a member of the H. lacerdae species complex , H. lacerdae was revised from a species to a species complex which consisted of 5 species; H. australis, H. curupira, H. intermedius, H. lacerdae and this species. The genus Hoplias is classified in the family Erythrinidae which is within the suborder Characoidei of the order Characiformes.

== Etymology ==
Hoplias brasiliensis is a species within the genus Hoplias, a word derived from the Greek hoplon, which means "shield" or "armour", an allusion to the armour created by the enlarged cranial bones and large teeth of these fishes. The specific name, brasiliensis, means "of Brazil", a reference to this fish being restricted to northeastern Brazil'.

== Description ==
Hoplias brasiliensis has a laterosensory canal along the lower surface of the dentary which has between 4 and 6 pores, it has between 38 and 43 pores along its lateral line. In comparison with H. australis, H. curupira and H. lacerdae the anterior profile of the head is angular rather than rounded. The ground colour of the head and body is pale brown. This species reaches a standard length of 20.3 cm (8.0 in).

== Distribution ==
Hoplias brasiliensis is endemic to northeastern Brazil where it is found in coastal drainages between the Paraguaçu River in the state of Bahia to the Jequitinhonha River in the states of Minas Gerais and Bahia, including the Contas River and the Pardo River.
