= Hoplias teres =

Scientific classification
- Domain: Eukaryota
- Kingdom: Animalia
- Phylum: Chordata
- Class: Actinopterygii
- Order: Characiformes
- Family: Erythrinidae
- Genus: Hoplias
- Species: H. teres

Binomial name
- Hoplias teres (Valenciennes, 1847)

Synonyms
- Macrodon teres Valenciennes, 1847

Species of fish

Hoplias teres is a species of trahiras. It is a tropical, benthopelagic freshwater fish which is known to inhabit Lake Maracaibo in Venezuela. Males can reach a maximum length of 15.3 centimetres.

Hoplias teres was originally described by Achille Valenciennes in 1847, under the genus Macrodon. It was listed as a valid species of Hoplias by Osvaldo Takeshi Oyakawa in 2003.
