= Hoplias patana =

Scientific classification
- Kingdom: Animalia
- Phylum: Chordata
- Class: Actinopterygii
- Division: Teleostei
- Order: Characiformes
- Family: Erythrinidae
- Genus: Hoplias
- Species: H. patana

Binomial name
- Hoplias patana (Valenciennes, 1847)

Synonyms
- Macrodon patana Valenciennes, 1847

Species of fish

Hoplias patana is a species of trahiras. It is a freshwater fish which is known from Cayenne, French Guiana. The maximum length recorded for this species is 39.4 centimetres.

It was originally described by Achille Valenciennes in 1847, under the genus Macrodon. It was listed as a valid species of Hoplias by Osvaldo Takeshi Oyakawa in 2003.
