= Quadrigyrus =

Scientific classification
- Kingdom: Animalia
- Phylum: Acanthocephala
- Class: Eoacanthocephala
- Order: Gyracanthocephala
- Family: Quadrigyridae
- Subfamily: Quadrigyrinae
- Genus: Quadrigyrus; Van Cleave, 1920

Type species
- Quadrigyrus torquatus Van Cleave, 1920

Genus of parasitic worms

Quadrigyrus is a genus in Acanthocephala (thorny-headed worms, also known as spiny-headed worms).

== Taxonomy ==
The genus was described by Van Cleave in 1920. The National Center for Biotechnology Information does not indicate that any phylogenetic analysis has been published on Quadrigyrus that would confirm its position as a unique order in the family Quadrigyridae.

== Description ==
Quadrigyrus species consist of a proboscis covered in hooks and a long trunk.

== Species ==
The genus Quadrigyrus Van Cleave, 1920 contains nine species.

- Quadrigyrus brasiliensis Machado-Filho, 1941
- Quadrigyrus chinensis Mao, 1979
- Quadrigyrus guptai Gupta and Gunjan-Sinh, 1992
- Quadrigyrus machadoi Fabio, 1983
- Quadrigyrus nickoli Schmidt and Hugghins, 1973

Q. nickoli was found infesting Hoplerythrinus unitaeniatus from Colombia. It has four circular rows of between 23 and 29 trunk spines each with heavy dendritic roots. The species name nickoli is named after Dr. Brent B. Nickol, a parasitologist from the University of Nebraska.

- Quadrigyrus polyspinosus Li, 1984
- Quadrigyrus rhodei Wang, 1980
- Quadrigyrus simhai Gupta and Fatma, 1986
- Quadrigyrus torquatus Van Cleave, 1920

Q. torquatus has been found infesting the intestines of Ageneiosus caucanus and Hoplias malabaricus in the Magdalena River basin in Colombia. It was also found in Hoplerythrinus unitaeniatus also from Colombia.

== Distribution ==
The distribution of Quadrigyrus is determined by that of its hosts.

== Hosts ==
Life cycle of Acanthocephala. (Note: There are no known aberrant human infections for Quadrigyrus species.)

The life cycle of an acanthocephalan consists of three stages beginning when an infective acanthor (development of an egg) is released from the intestines of the definitive host and then ingested by an arthropod, the intermediate host. Although the intermediate hosts of Quadrigyrus are ???. When the acanthor molts, the second stage called the acanthella begins. This stage involves penetrating the wall of the mesenteron or the intestine of the intermediate host and growing. The final stage is the infective cystacanth which is the larval or juvenile state of an Acanthocephalan, differing from the adult only in size and stage of sexual development. The cystacanths within the intermediate hosts are consumed by the definitive host, usually attaching to the walls of the intestines, and as adults they reproduce sexually in the intestines. The acanthor is passed in the feces of the definitive host and the cycle repeats. There may be paratenic hosts (hosts where parasites infest but do not undergo larval development or sexual reproduction) for Quadrigyrus.

Quadrigyrus parasitizes animals. There are no reported cases of Quadrigyrus infesting humans in the English language medical literature.

Hosts for Quadrigyrus species

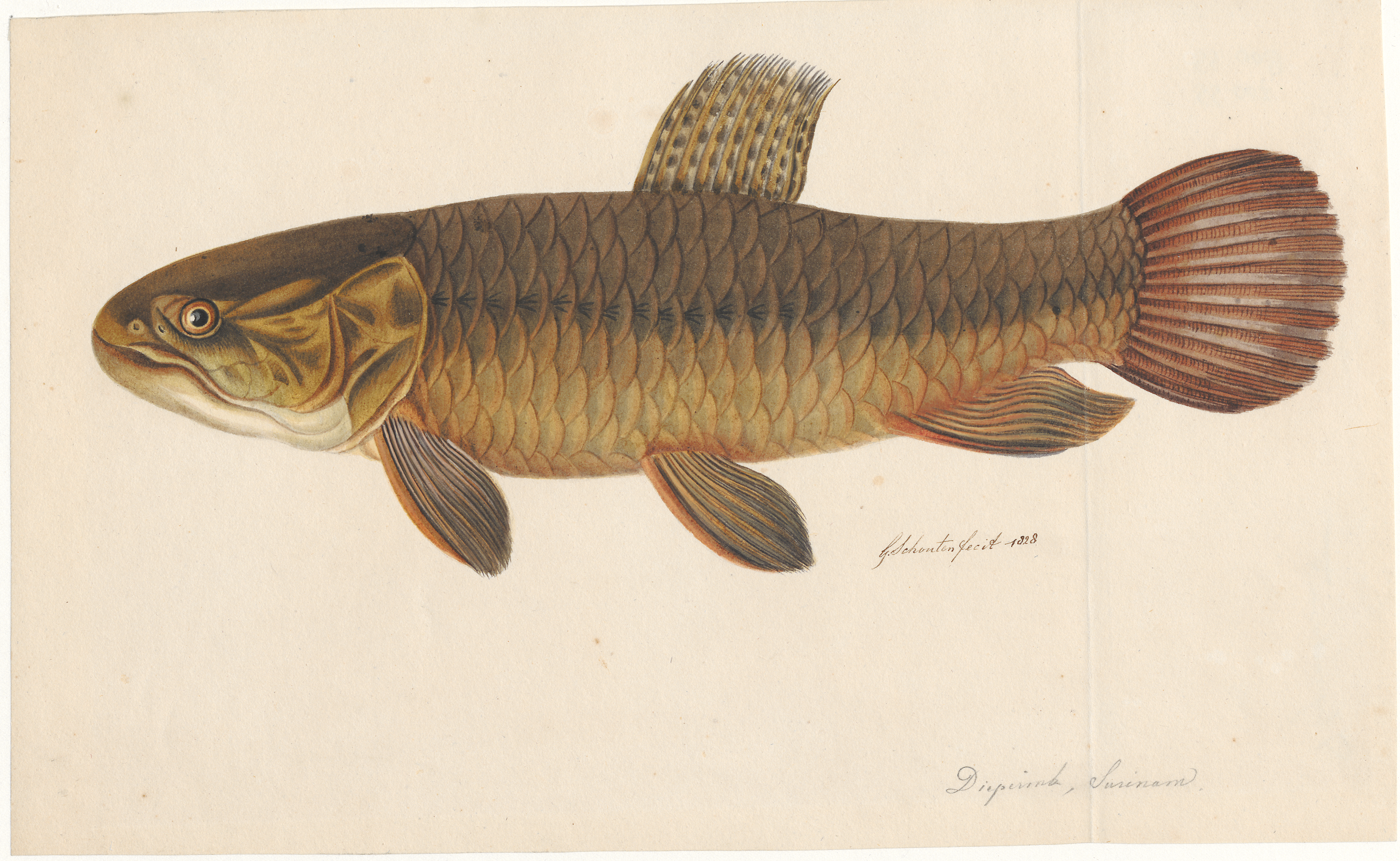
Hoplerythrinus unitaeniatus is a host of Q nickoli and Q. torquatus

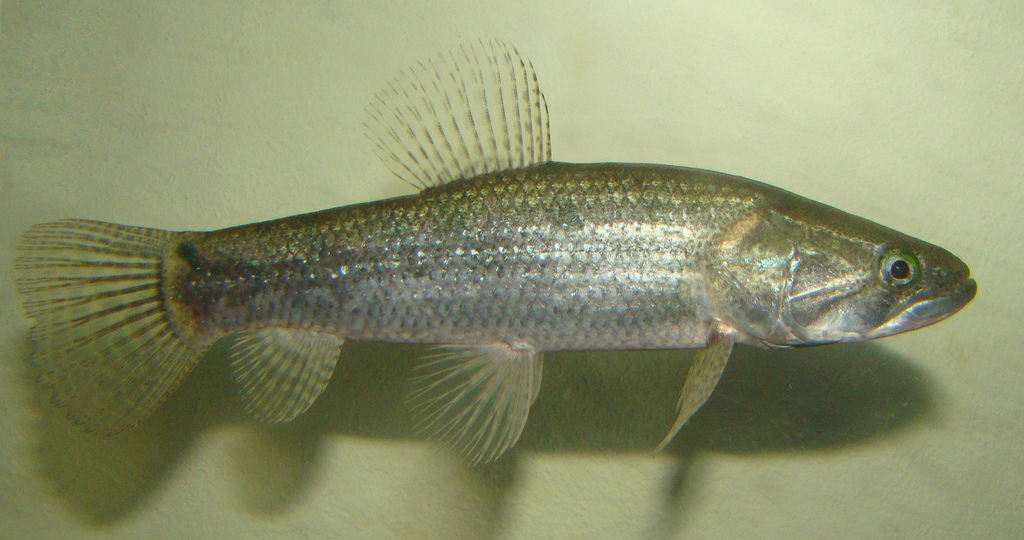
Hoplias malabaricus is a host of Q. torquatus
