= Hoplerythrinus gronovii =

Scientific classification
- Kingdom: Animalia
- Phylum: Chordata
- Class: Actinopterygii
- Order: Characiformes
- Family: Erythrinidae
- Genus: Hoplerythrinus
- Species: H. gronovii

Binomial name
- Hoplerythrinus gronovii (Valenciennes, 1847)

Synonyms
- Erythrinus gronovii Valenciennes, 1847

Species of fish

Hoplerythrinus gronovii, the Jeju wolffish, is a species of freshwater ray-finned fish belonging to the family Erythrinidae, the trahiras. This little known species is found in northern South America.

== Taxonomy ==
Hoplerythrinus gronovii was first formally described as Erythrinus gronovii in 1847 by the French zoologist Achille Valenciennes, with its type locality given as Cayenne, French Guiana. It was listed as a valid species of Erythrinus by Osvaldo Takeshi Oyakawa in 2003. This taxon is classified within the genus Hoplerythrinus in the family Erythrinidae, which is within the suborder Characoidei of the order Characiformes.

== Etymology ==
Hoplerythrinus gronovii is a member of the genus Hoplerythrinus. This name combines the Greek hoplon, meaning "shield" or "armour", a reference to the infraorbital bones being large and covering the cheeks, with the genus name Erythrinus. These enlarged infraorbital bones are not unique to this genus, and all trahiras have them. The specific name honours the Dutch naturalist Laurens Theodorus Gronovius, who Valenciennes claimed illustrated this species in volume 2 of his book Museum Ichthyologicum, published in 1756.

== Description ==
Hoplerythrinus gronovii attains a maximum standard length of 17.8 cm (7.0 in). The fishes in this genus are obligate air breathers, and have a highly vascularised swim bladder as an adpation to air breathing. They gulp air at the surface, allowing them to survive in stagnant and anaerobic waters, and can even move short distances out of water.

== Distribution and habitat ==
Hoplerythrinus gronovii is known only from French Guiana, where it is a pelagic fish of freshwaters.
