= Hoplias microcephalus =

Conservation status
- Data Deficient (IUCN 3.1)

Scientific classification
- Kingdom: Animalia
- Phylum: Chordata
- Class: Actinopterygii
- Division: Teleostei
- Order: Characiformes
- Family: Erythrinidae
- Genus: Hoplias
- Species: H. microcephalus

Binomial name
- Hoplias microcephalus (Agassiz, 1829)

Synonyms
- Erythrinus microcephalus Agassiz, 1829; Macrodon intermedius Günther, 1864

Species of fish

Hoplias microcephalus is a species of trahiras. It is a tropical, benthopelagic freshwater fish which is known to inhabit the São Francisco River in Brazil. Males can reach a maximum length of 35.6 cm (14.0 in).

H. microcephalus was originally described by Louis Agassiz in 1829, under the genus Erythrinus. It was listed as a valid species of Hoplias by O.T. Oyakawa in 2003.
