= Jataí Ecological Station =

- Estação Ecológica de Jataí
- IUCN category Ia (strict nature reserve)
- Location within Brazil
- Nearest city: Luís Antônio, São Paulo
- Coordinates: 21°36′25″S 47°47′40″W
- Area: 9,075 ha (35.04 sq mi)
- Designation: Ecological station
- Created: 15 June 1982
- Administrator: Fundação Florestal

The Jataí Ecological Station (Portuguese: Estação Ecológica de Jataí) is an ecological station (ESEC) in the state of São Paulo, Brazil. It protects an area of cerrado and a lagoon system that is important for fish breeding.

== Location ==
The Jataí Ecological Station "Conde Joaquim Augusto Ribeiro do Valle" is in the municipality of Luís Antônio, São Paulo. It has an area of 9,075 hectares (22,420 acres). All the land is state-owned. The ESEC is in the Mogi-Guaçu River basin. The ESEC is bordered on one side by the Mogi-Guaçu River, and contains part of its floodplain. Altitudes range from 520 to 642 metres (1,706 to 2,106 ft). Attractions include the Beija-Flora dam, Diogo Cross, Porto Ruins, Mogi-Guaçu River and marginal ponds. The station contains a complex of 15 lagoons that is of vital importance for reproduction of rheophilic fish of the Mogi-Guaçu River.

== History ==
The Jataí Ecological Station was created by Governor José Maria Marin by decree 18.997 of 15 June 1982 to protect the ecosystems and lagoon complex and to support scientific research and education. By decree 20.809 José Maria Marin changed the name to the "Conde Joaquim Augusto Ribeiro do Valle" Jataí Ecological Station. The original area was 4,532.18 hectares (11,199.3 acres).

Decree 47.096 extended the limits to cover an area of 9,074.63 hectares (22,423.9 acres) consisting of "A" and "B" segments, both state-owned, containing one of the last remnants of cerrado and cerradão, with a variety of flora and fauna to be preserved so future generations can enjoy the biodiversity, for scientific, cultural and educational purposes, and for its value as a genetic bank. Land added to the ESEC was taken from the Luiz Antonio Experimental Station, which was reduced to about 2,000 hectares (4,900 acres). The consultative council was created by ordinance 103/2009 of 6 November 2009. The management plan was published in October 2013.

== Environment ==
The ESEC is in the Savanna and Interior Atlantic Forest biomes. It holds one of the largest remnants of mesophytic semideciduous forest and savanna in the state. The largest area holds cerrado, with contact with seasonal semi-deciduous forest. Vegetation types are:

Type	Area (ha)	% of Unit
Cerradão	5,492.89	60.83%
Cerrado (regenerating)	1,737.46	19.24%
Transitional seasonal semi-deciduous forest	1,111.59	12.31%
Várzea forest	257.83	2.86%
Rocky field (Campo sujo)	107.09	1.19%
Cerrado strict sense	64.64	0.72%
Former Pine and Eucalyptus plantations (in recovery)	205.15	2.27%
Marginal lagoons and Beija Flor reservoir	53.80	0.60%

Endangered plant species include Bowdichia virgilioides (Fabaceae), Eugenia klotzschiana (Myrtaceae), Euterpe edulis (Arecaceae) and Dicksonia sellowiana (Dicksoniaceae). The main land uses around the ESEC are sugar cane plantations and commercial eucalyptus forests. The monocultures in the surroundings causes fragmentation and affect species with limited mobility in terms of mating and access to food.

478 species of vertebrates have been identified, with 21 taxa of endangered species. These include six mammal species: giant anteater (Myrmecophaga tridactyla), black howler (Alouatta caraya), maned wolf (Chrysocyon brachyurus), cougar (Puma concolor), ocelot (Leopardus pardalis), and marsh deer (Blastocerus dichotomus). There are eight endangered species of birds including the undulated tinamou (Crypturellus undulatus), pied plover (Vanellus cayanus) and red-shouldered macaw (Diopsittaca nobilis) and three species of endangered fish: Phallotorynus jucundus, Myleus tiete and Hoplias lacerdae. A 2006 study found 21 species of frog from 5 families, mostly typical of open areas or widely distributed species that occupy various habitats.

== Human activities ==
There is some irregular surveillance of the interior and marginal areas of the park. The environmental police access it via the Mogi-Guaçu River. The park is visited by university students for practical classes, accompanied by a guide. The station is used intensively for biological research by the Federal University of São Carlos. A two-volume publication on the area's biodiversity and its use, Estação Ecológica de Jataí, was published in 2000 by RIMA Editora, São Carlos. Research is undertaken on the fauna and flora, physical and human aspects of the environment.

Threats include hunting, fishing and extraction of forest products, a sand port on the Mogi-Guaçu, domestic animals and the nearby road.
