= Erythrinus kessleri =

Scientific classification
- Kingdom: Animalia
- Phylum: Chordata
- Class: Actinopterygii
- Division: Teleostei
- Order: Characiformes
- Family: Erythrinidae
- Genus: Erythrinus
- Species: E. kessleri

Binomial name
- Erythrinus kessleri Steindachner, 1877

Species of fish

Erythrinus kessleri is a species of trahira (family Erythrinidae). It is a tropical, freshwater fish which is known from coastal rivers in Bahia, Brazil; the type locality is the Itapicuru River. It was described by Franz Steindachner in 1877. Males can reach a maximum standard length of 19 centimetres.

Although the patronym was not identified, it was probably in honor of German-Russian zoologist Karl Fedorovich Kessler (1815-1881).
