= Paleohoplias =

Paleohoplias Temporal range: Late Miocene-Pliocene, 9–4 Ma

Scientific classification
- Kingdom: Animalia
- Phylum: Chordata
- Class: Actinopterygii
- Order: Characiformes
- Family: Erythrinidae
- Genus: †Paleohoplias; Bocquentin & Negri in Gayet, Jegu, Bocquentin & Negri, 2003

Type species
- Paleohoplias assisbrasiliensis Bocquentin & Negri in Gayet, Jegu, Bocquentin & Negri, 2003

Other species
- †Paleohoplias amazonensis Decat et al, 2026

Extinct genus of fish

Paleohoplias is an extinct genus of freshwater characin fish in the family Erythrinidae found in Brazil, South America. Two species are known.

== Taxonomy ==
The type species †Paleohoplias assisbrasiliensis Bocquentin & Negri, 2003 was described in 2003, and was found in the Solimões Formation in the State of Acre, Brazil, dating to the Huayqueriense-Montehermoseuse (Late Miocene-Pliocene) age. A second species, †Paleohoplias amazonensis Decat et al, 2026 was described from the same formation in 2026.

== Etymology ==
The generic name Paleohoplias comes from the Greek palaios, which means "old", and hoplias, which is a closely related genus of fish in the same family, Erythrinidae. The species name assisbrasiliensis is in reference to the city of Assis Brasil, which is near the type locality.

== Classification ==
Paleohoplias is one of four genera within the family Erythrinidae, and the only extinct genus. It is most closely related to the genus Hoplias.
