= Luiz Antônio =

Luiz Antônio may refer to:

- Luiz Antônio (footballer, born 1970), Luiz Antônio Moraes, Brazilian football manager and former forward
- Luiz Antônio (footballer, born 1991), Luiz Antônio de Souza Soares, Brazilian football defensive midfielder

== See also ==
- Luís Antônio, municipality São Paulo, Brazil
