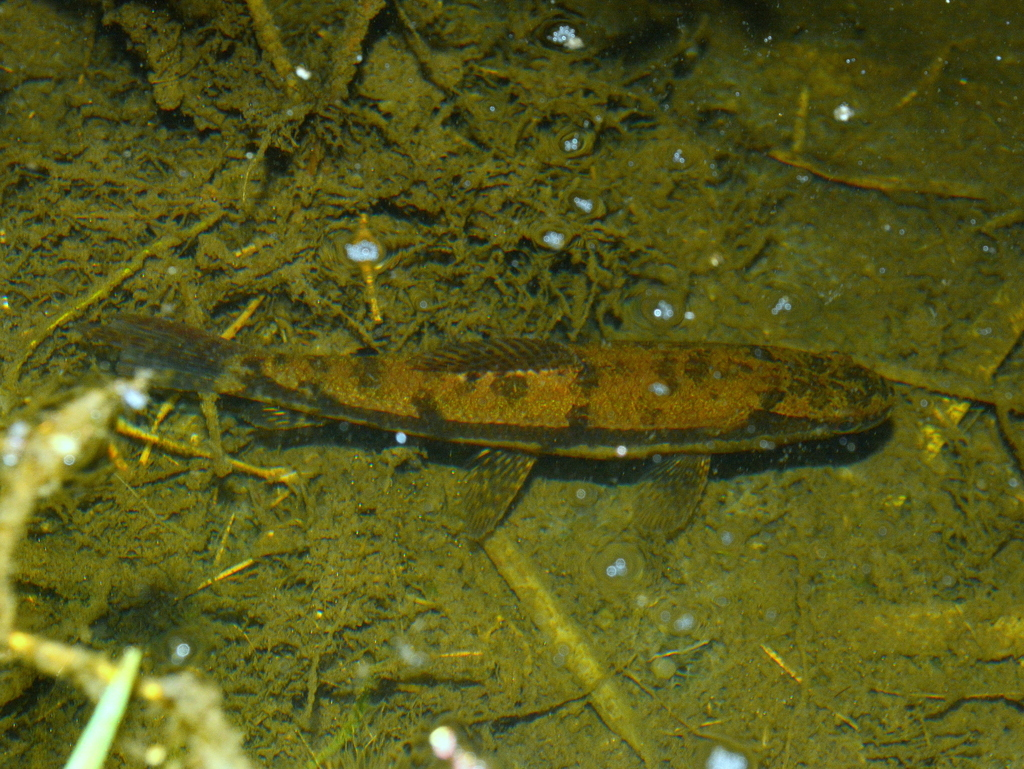

Conservation status
- Least Concern (IUCN 3.1)

Scientific classification
- Kingdom: Animalia
- Phylum: Chordata
- Class: Actinopterygii
- Order: Characiformes
- Family: Erythrinidae
- Genus: Hoplias
- Species: H. lacerdae

Binomial name
- Hoplias lacerdae A. Miranda-Ribeiro, 1908

= Hoplias lacerdae =

Species of fish

Hoplias lacerdae, the blue wolf fish or trairão, is a species of freshwater ray-finned fish belonging to the family Erythrinidae, the trahiras. This species is found in southern Brazil, northern Argentina and Uruguay.

== Taxonomy ==
Hoplias lacerdae was first formally described in 1908 by the Brazilian herpetologist and ichthyologist Alípio de Miranda-Ribeiro with its type locality given as Iporanga, Rio Ribeira de Iguape in São Paulo State, Brazil. This taxon has been regarded as a synonym of H. malabaricus but molecular studies have shown that this taxon is not closely related to H. malabaricus. This species is the type species of the H. lacerdae species complex , H. lacerdae was revised from a species to a species complex which consisted of 5 species; H. australis, H. brasiliensis, H. curupira, H. intermedius, and this species. The genus Hoplias is classified in the family Erythrinidae which is within the suborder Characoidei of the order Characiformes.

== Etymology ==
Hoplias lacerdae is a species within the genus Hoplias, a word derived from the Greek hoplon, which means "shield" or "armour", an allusion to the armour created by the enlarged cranial bones and large teeth of these fishes. The specific name honours the physician and anthropologist João Batista de Lacerda, the director of the National Museum of Brazil in Rio de Janeiro, because of his interest in the scientific explorations of the region.

== Description ==
They can grow up to 97 cm (38 in) in length and the maximum published weight is 4.99 kg (11 lb 0 oz). he body is elongated with a circular cross section. It has between 6 and 8 pores along the lower surface of the dentary and 43-48 scales along its lateral line, these counts being greater than similar counts for the other species in the H. lacerdae species complex.

== Distribution ==
Hoplias lacerdae is found in southern Brazil, northeastern Argentina and Uruguay and is found the Ribeira de Iguape River basin and in the Uruguay River basin, as far south as the Rio Negro in Uruguay. This species can be found in streams, rivers and lakes.

== Biology ==
Hoplias lacerdae typically live in the backwaters of rivers, forming pairs, the females are batch spawners. They are piscivorous ambush predators, waiting for prey while hiding among thick aquatic vegetation.

== Utilisation ==
Hoplias lacerdae is targeted by fisheries in Brazil and Uruguay, it was prized for its large size and palatable flesh and is stull important to commercial fisheries and in aquaculture.
