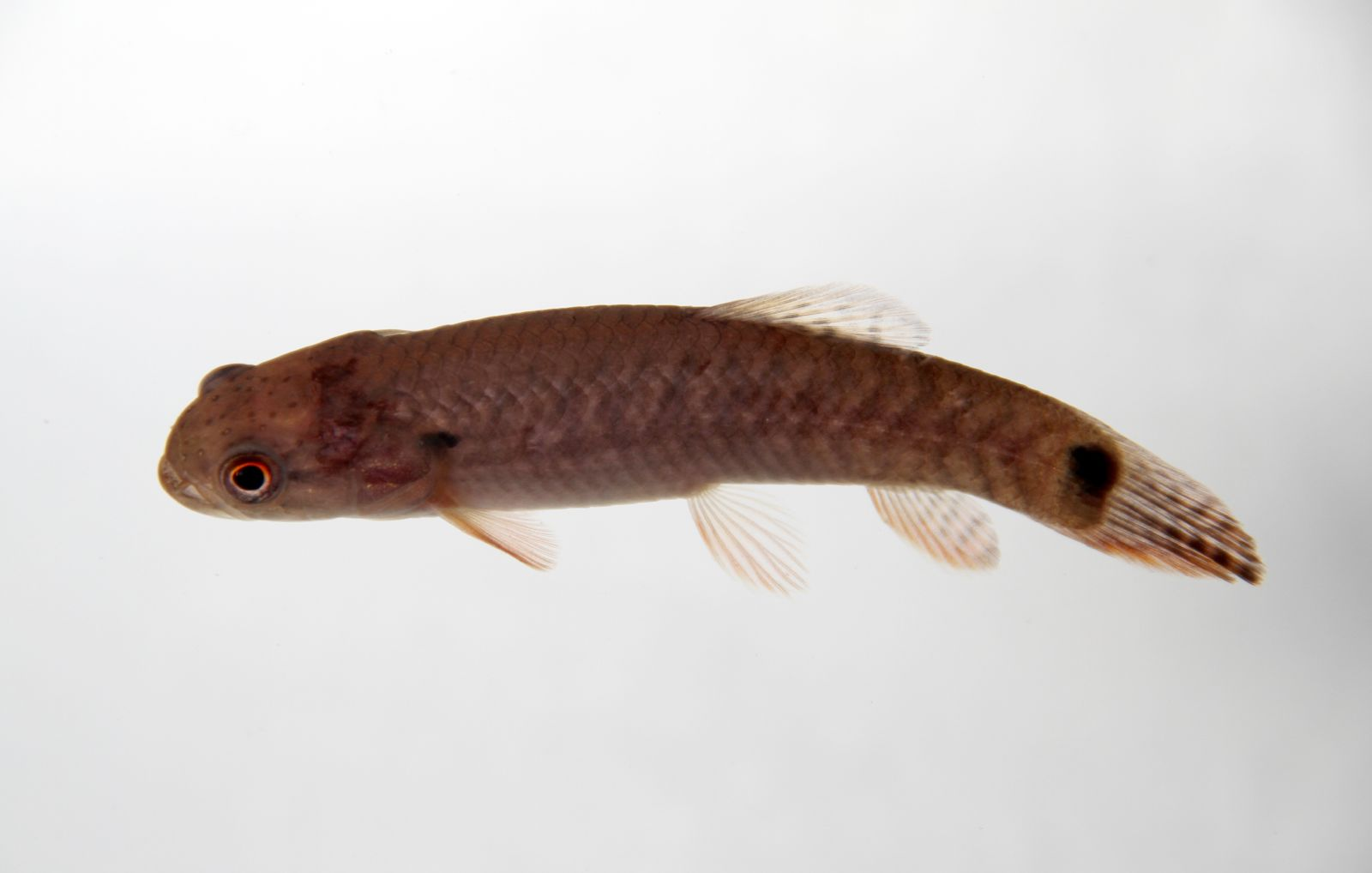

Conservation status
- Least Concern (IUCN 3.1)

Scientific classification
- Kingdom: Animalia
- Phylum: Chordata
- Class: Actinopterygii
- Order: Characiformes
- Family: Erythrinidae
- Genus: Erythrinus
- Species: E. erythrinus

Binomial name
- Erythrinus erythrinus (Bloch & Schneider, 1801)

Synonyms
- Synodus erythrinus Bloch & Schneider, 1801; Erythrinus brevicauda Günther, 1864; Erythrinus longipinnis Günther, 1864; Erythrinus salmoneus Gray, 1854

= Erythrinus erythrinus =

Species of fish

Erythrinus erythrinus, the red wolf fish, is a relatively small species of trahira (family Erythrinidae) from freshwater habitats in South America.

== Range and habitat ==
E. erythrinus is a South American freshwater fish that is native to the Amazon and Orinoco basins, as well as rivers in the Guianas. The species is also reported as native to the Paraná—Paraguay basin, including the Pantanal, but the population in the lower Paraná basin and Iguazu basin may be an undescribed species. E. erythrinus has been introduced to the upper Paraná basin where not native. It mainly lives in creeks and marshes where the water has a pH of 5.6–7.8.

== Appearance and behavior ==
E. erythrinus can reach a maximum standard length of 20 cm (7.9 in), although other reports suggest it can reach about 25 cm (10 in).

It feeds primarily on small fish, insects, and benthic crustaceans. Juveniles are aggressive mimics of female aplocheilid killifish, notably Laimosemion agilae, and they use this to catch male killifish that seek a mate.

E. erythrinus is not of major interest to fisheries, but is sometimes used as a bait fish and seen in the aquarium fish trade.

== Taxonomy ==
It was described by Marcus Elieser Bloch and Johann Gottlob Schneider in 1801, originally under the lizardfish genus Synodus. The species was first placed in Erythrinus in 1854 by Gray (under the name Erythrinus salmoneus, a junior synonym of Erythrinus erythrinus), and this treatment has been recognized by recent authorities such as Osvaldo Takeshi Oyakawa in 2003.
