= Hoplerythrinus =

Scientific classification
- Kingdom: Animalia
- Phylum: Chordata
- Class: Actinopterygii
- Order: Characiformes
- Family: Erythrinidae
- Genus: Hoplerythrinus; T. N. Gill, 1896

Type species
- Erythrinus unitaeniatus Spix & Agassiz, 1829

Synonyms
- Ophiocephalops Fowler, 1906; Pseuderythrinus Hoedeman, 1950

Genus of fishes

Hoplerythrinus is a genus of freshwater ray-finned fishes belonging to the family Erythrinidae, the trahiras. The fishes in this genus are found in Central and South America.

== Species ==
Hoplerythrinus contains the following valid species:

- Hoplerythrinus cinereus (T. N. Gill, 1858)
- Hoplerythrinus gronovii (Valenciennes, 1847)
- Hoplerythrinus unitaeniatus (Spix & Agassiz, 1829)
