= Formosa do Sul =

Coordinates: 26°38′55″S 52°47′47″W

Formosa do Sul, Santa Catarina
- Municipality
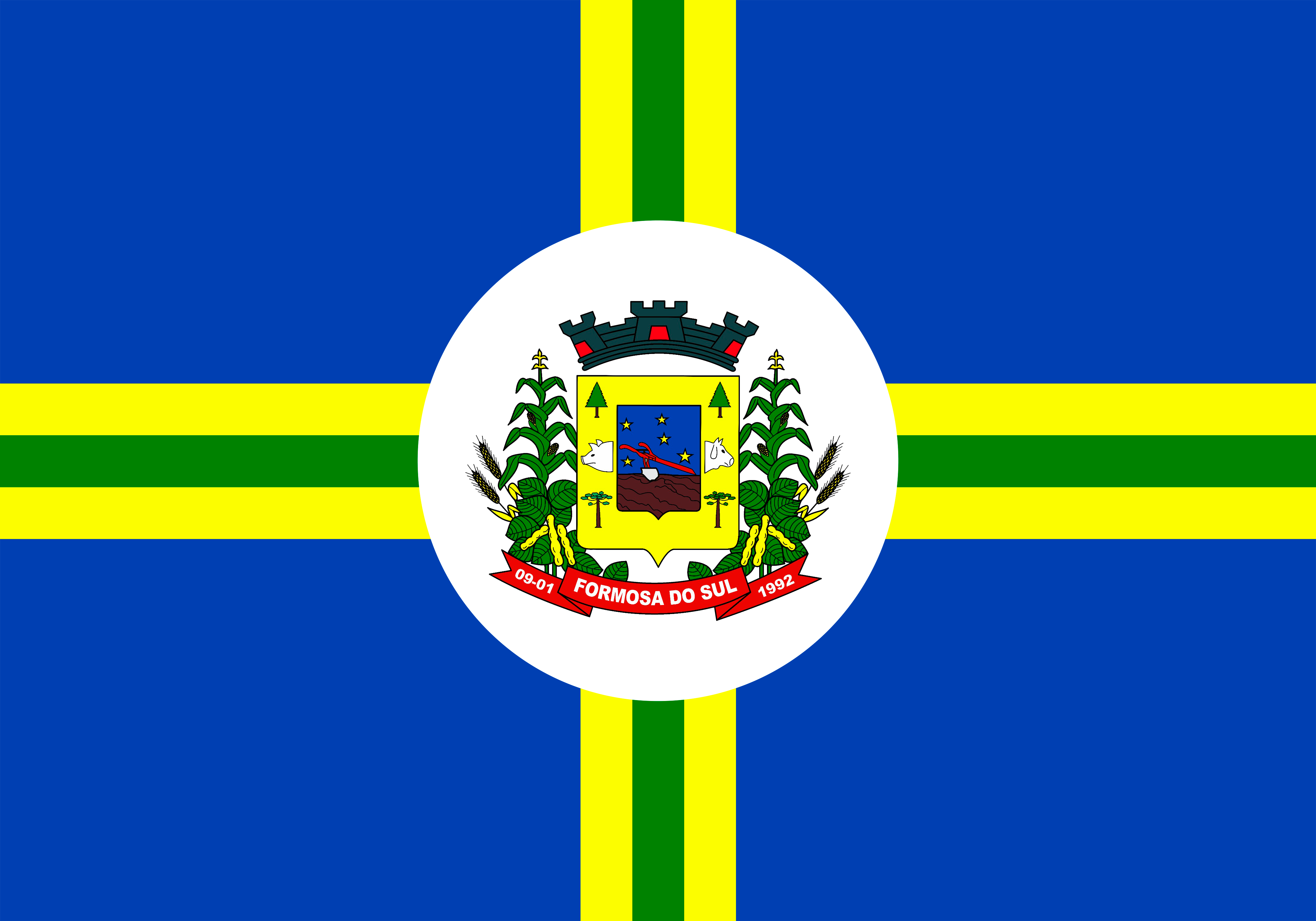
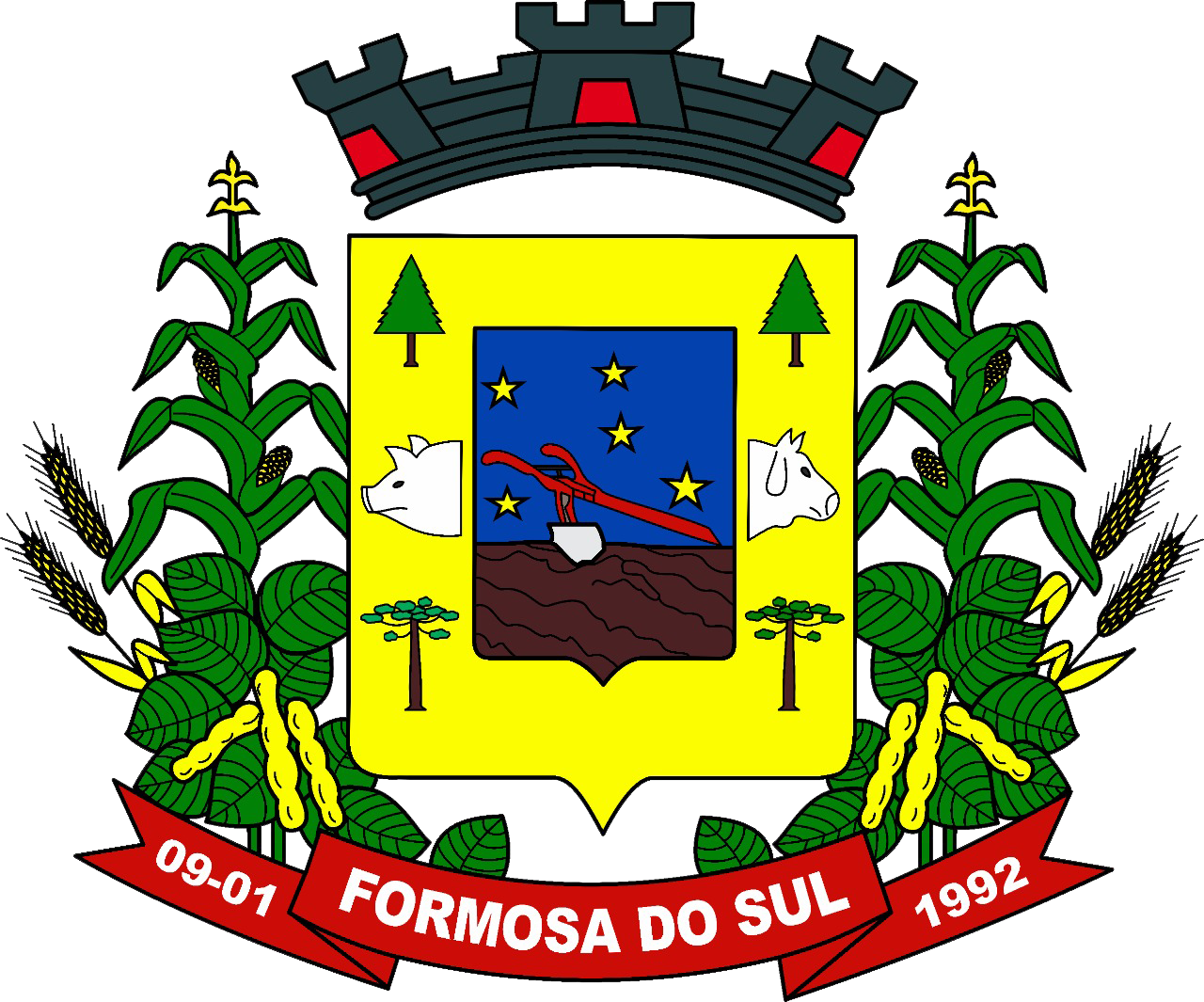
- Flag Coat of arms
- Nickname: Formosa
- Interactive map of Formosa do Sul, Santa Catarina
- Country: Brazil
- Region: South
- State: Santa Catarina
- Mesoregion: Oeste Catarinense

Government
  - Mayor: Rudimar Conte (PT)

Area
  - Total: 38,651 sq mi (100,105 km^{2})

Population (2020)
  - Total: 2,495
  - Density: 0.06455/sq mi (0.02492/km^{2})
- Time zone: UTC -3
- Postal code: 89859-000
- Area code: +55 49

Formosa do Sul is a Brazilian municipality in the state of Santa Catarina. The elevation is 500 m. The population in 2020 was 2,495. The area is 100 km².

== See also ==
- List of municipalities in Santa Catarina
