= Luís Antônio =

- Municipality
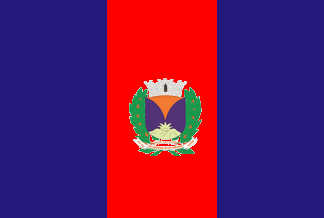
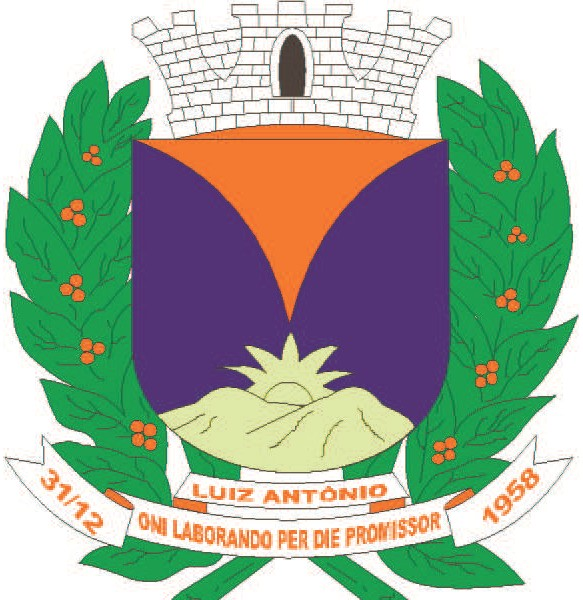
- Flag Coat of arms

- Location in São Paulo state

- Location in Brazil
- Coordinates: 21°33′18″S 47°42′16″W
- Country: Brazil
- Region: Southeast
- State: São Paulo

Area
  - Total: 598 km^{2} (231 sq mi)

Population (2020)
  - Total: 15,292
  - Density: 25.6/km^{2} (66.2/sq mi)
- Time zone: UTC−3 (BRT)

Luís Antônio is a municipality in the state of São Paulo in Brazil. The population is 15,292 (2020 est.) in an area of 598 km^{2}. The elevation is 675 m.

The municipality contains the 22,420 hectares (55,400 acres) Jataí Ecological Station, created in 1982.

== Media ==
In telecommunications, the city was served by Telecomunicações de São Paulo. In July 1998, this company was acquired by Telefónica, which adopted the Vivo brand in 2012. The company is currently an operator of cell phones, fixed lines, internet (fiber optics/4G) and television (satellite and cable).

== See also ==
- List of municipalities in São Paulo
- Interior of São Paulo
