= Cerradão =

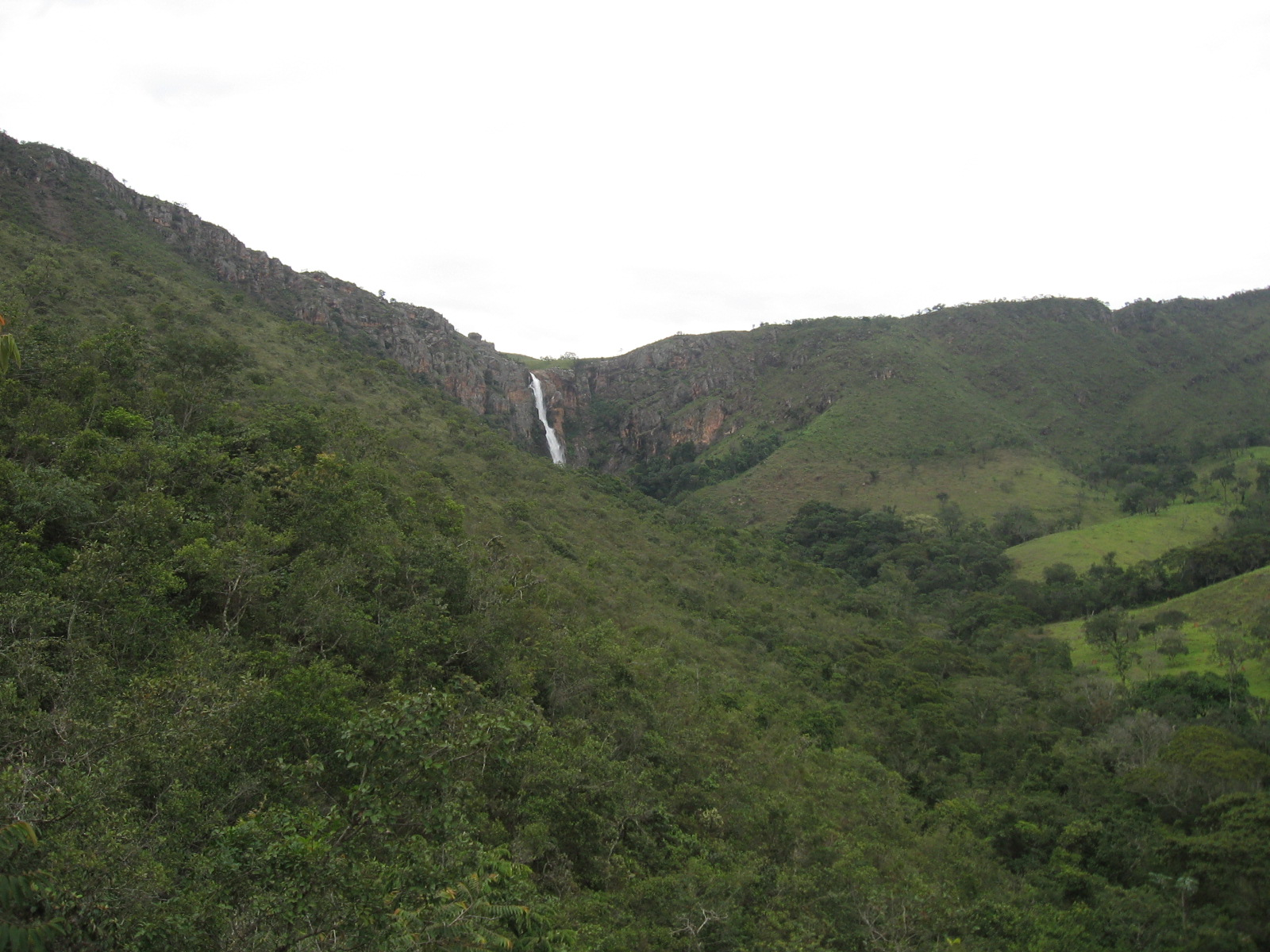
Cerradão in the Serra da Canastra National Park

Cerradão is a type of dry forest found in Brazil, associated with the cerrado savanna ecoregion.

== Structure ==
Cerradão is a drought-resistant ("xerophitic") type of forest, with relatively sparse and slender trees. It includes species that are found in the cerrado strict sense and others that are found in forest. It has a canopy that is mostly continuous with tree coverage of 50% to 90%. Trees have an average height of 8 to 15 metres (26 to 49 ft). Cerradão trees are taller and denser than cerrado, and have straighter trunks without lower branches. Although physiognomically cerradão is a forest, floristically it is closer to a cerrado. The lighting conditions allow formation of differentiated strata of shrubs and herbs. The undergrowth bushes average 2 to 5 metres (6 ft 7 in to 16 ft 5 in) in height. The ground layer consists of grasses that grow where there is most light.

Leaves are often small and succulent, capable of holding water, with dense hairs or thick skin that prevent loss of water. The falling leaves add organic matter to the soil. Typically the soils are deep, well-drained, slightly acidic and of low to medium fertility.

== Flora ==
Many species are evergreen, but deciduous trees are common, including Caryocar brasiliense (pequi), Kielmeyera coriacea (pau-santo) and Qualea grandiflora (pau-terra). Common species adapted to the poorer soils include Emmotum nitens (sobre), Xylopia aromatica (pimenta-de-macaco), Caryocar brasiliense (pequi), Maprounea guianensis (pinga-orvalho) and Copaifera langsdorffii (copaíba). Common species where the soil is richer include Anadenanthera colubrina (angico), Astronium fraxinifolium (gonçalo-alves), Dilodendron bippinatum (maria-pobre) and Callisthene fasciculata (jacaré-da-folha-grande).

== Threats ==
Originally about 1% of the cerrado was cerradão. Cerradão is one of the most vulnerable vegetation types in the cerrado. It covers a small area, is vulnerable to fires, and is exploited for charcoal, timber, agriculture and pasturage. Relatively little of the cerradão is in protected areas.

== Sources ==
- Cerradão (in Portuguese), Chico Mendes Institute for Biodiversity Conservation
- Monik da Silveira Susçuarana, "Cerradão", InfoEscola (in Portuguese), iG Educação
