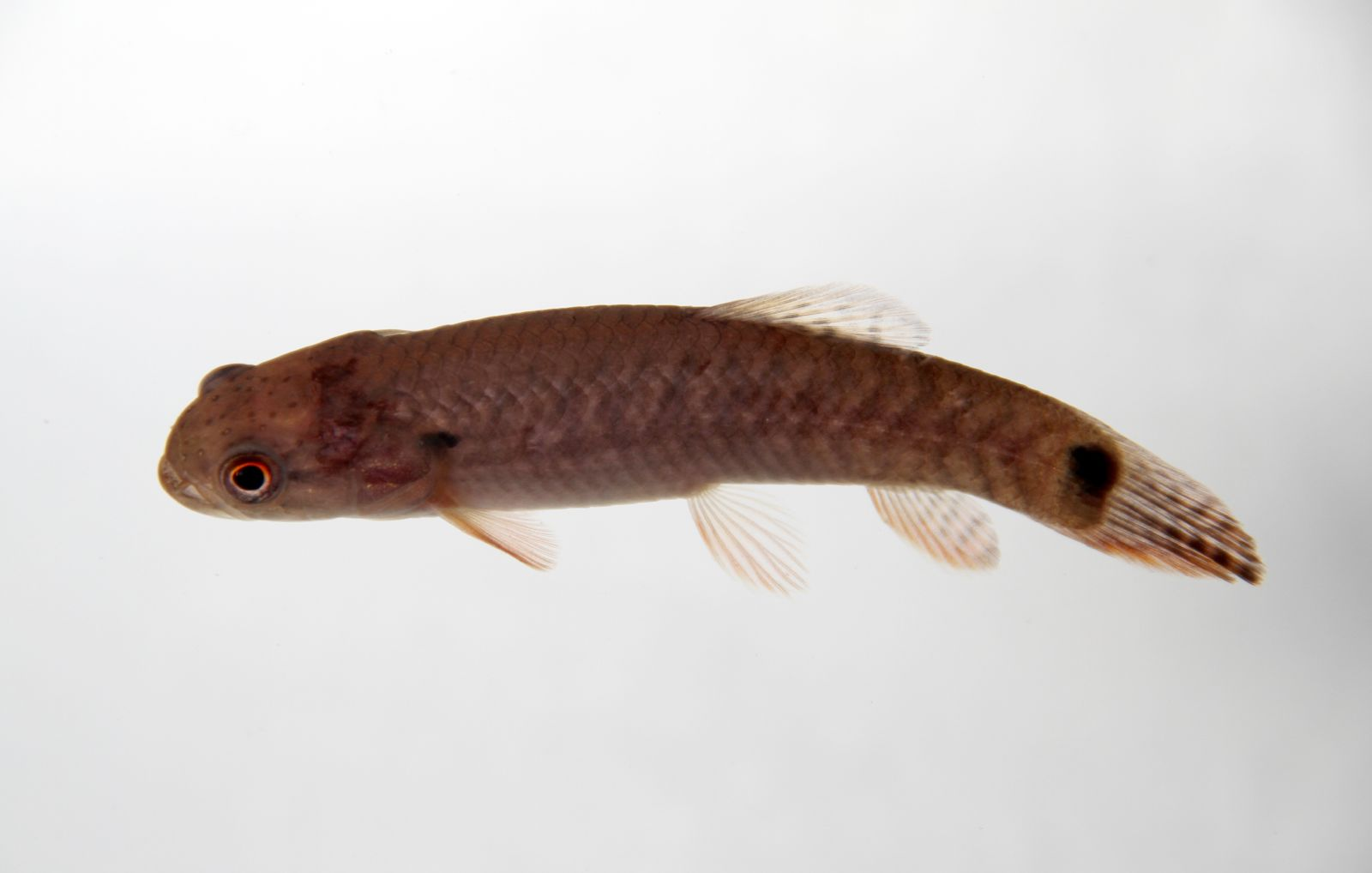
- Erythrinus erythrinus

Scientific classification
- Kingdom: Animalia
- Phylum: Chordata
- Class: Actinopterygii
- Order: Characiformes
- Family: Erythrinidae
- Genus: Erythrinus; Scopoli, 1777

Type species
- Synodus erythrinus Bloch & Schneider, 1801

Species
- See text

Synonyms
- Erythrichthys Bonaparte, 1831; Hetererythrinus Günther, 1864

= Erythrinus =

Genus of fishes

Erythrinus is a genus of relatively small trahiras, freshwater fish from tropical South America.

== Species ==
There are currently two recognized species in this genus, but a possibly undescribed species is known from the lower Paraná basin and Iguazu river basins.

- Erythrinus erythrinus (Bloch & Schneider, 1801)
- Erythrinus kessleri Steindachner, 1877
