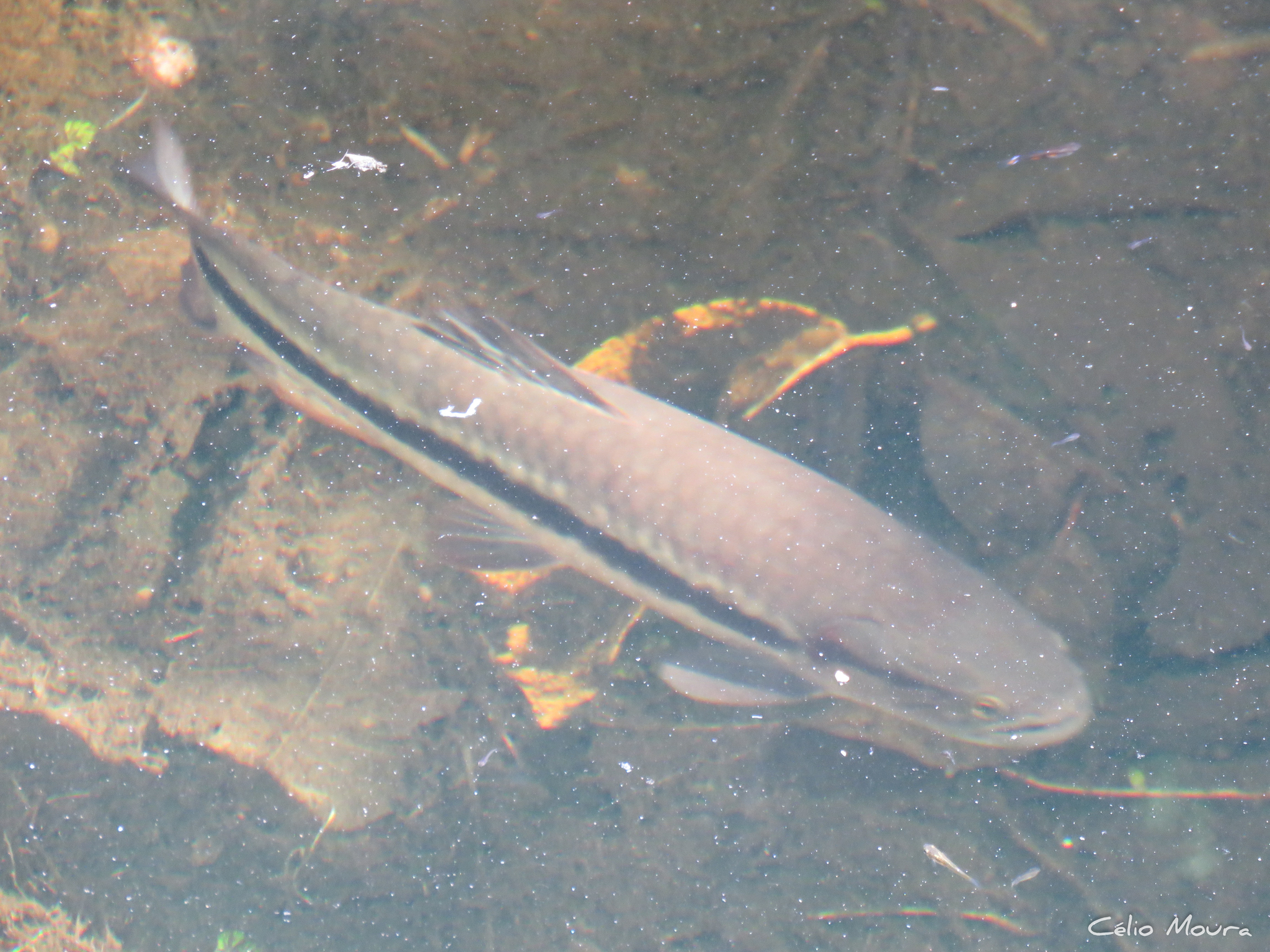

Conservation status
- Least Concern (IUCN 3.1)

Scientific classification
- Kingdom: Animalia
- Phylum: Chordata
- Class: Actinopterygii
- Order: Characiformes
- Family: Erythrinidae
- Genus: Hoplerythrinus
- Species: H. unitaeniatus

Binomial name
- Hoplerythrinus unitaeniatus (Spix & Agassiz, 1829)

Synonyms
- Erythrinus unitaeniatus Spix & Agassiz, 1829; Erythrinus vittatus Valenciennes, 1847; Pseuderythrinus rosapinnis Hoedeman, 1950

= Hoplerythrinus unitaeniatus =

Species of fish

Hoplerythrinus unitaeniatus, the gold wolffish, aimara or yarrow, is currently treated as a single species of freshwater ray-finned fish belonging to the family Erythrinidae, the trahiras. This is a widespread fish in tropical South America, and appears to be a species complex rather than a single species.

== Taxonomy ==
Hoplerythrinus unitaeniatus was first formally described as Erythrinus unitaeniatus in 1829. The type locality was the Rio São Francisco in Brazil, where the German biologist Johann Baptist von Spix collected the type, with the description being completed and published by the Swiss-American biologist Louis Agassiz. In 1896, Theodore Gill proposed the new monospecific genus Hoplerythrinus for this species, meaning it is the type species of that genus by monotypy. Molecular and phylogenetic research have led to the view that H. unitaeniatus is a species complex with a cryptic diversity of species within it. The genus Hoplerythrinus is classified in the family Erythrinidae, which is within the suborder Characoidei of the order Characiformes.

== Etymology ==
Hoplerythrinus unitaeniatus is the type species of the genus Hoplerythrinus. This name combines the Greek hoplon, meaning "shield" or "armour", a reference to the infraorbital bones being large and covering the cheeks, with the genus name Erythrinus. These enlarged infraorbital bones are not unique to this genus, and all trahiras have them. The specific name, unitaeniatus, "one banded", is thought to be a reference to the single longitudinal stripe along each flank.

== Description ==
Hoplerythrinus unitaeniatus has an elongate body with a terminal mouth. There is a single dark lateral stripe along the length of the body. There is a single dorsal fin, a single anal fin and paired pectoral and pelvic fins. There is a black ocellular spot on the gill cover. The gold wolffish attains a standard length of 28.5 cm (11.2 in) and a maximum weight of 520 g (18 oz).

== Distribution and habitat ==
Hoplerythrinus unitaeniatus is found in Central and South America. It occurs in the drainages of the Amazon, Magdalena, Orinoco, Paraná and São Francisco rivers, as well as in the coastal drainage systems of Guyana, Suriname and French Guiana. This fish's distribution stretches from Panama south to Argentina, Bolivia and Paraguay. The gold wolffish is found in swamps and creeks with low or no current, and can also be found in flooded savanna.

== Biology ==
Hoplerythrinus unitaeniatus has a highly vascularised swim bladder as an adaptation to air breathing. They gulp air at the surface, allowing them to survive in stagnant and anaerobic waters, and can even move short distances out of water. They can survive for long periods out of the water. The behaviour of gulping air at the surface means that these fishes are vulnerable to being preyed on by electric eels. They are predatory, preying on aquatic invertebrates and to a smaller extent, on fishes. Specimens measuring greater than 16 cm (6.3 in) were found to be sexually mature. Unlike other trahiras, this species is known to hunt in groups, pusruing fish and invertebrates either on the surface or along the substrate.

== Utilisation ==
Hoplerythrinus unitaeniatus is exploited as a food fish in some of the regions where it is found, and is exported by some countries for use in the aquarium trade.
