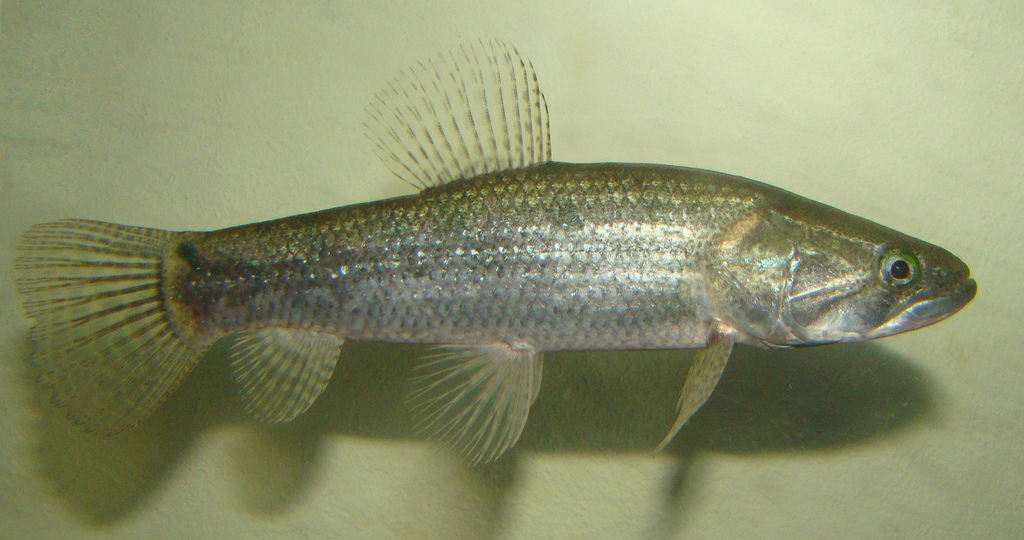
- Hoplias malabaricus

Scientific classification
- Kingdom: Animalia
- Phylum: Chordata
- Class: Actinopterygii
- Order: Characiformes
- Family: Erythrinidae
- Genus: Hoplias; T. N. Gill, 1903

Type species
- Esox malabaricus Bloch, 1794

Synonyms
- Macrodon Müller, 1843

= Hoplias =

Genus of fishes

Hoplias is a genus of freshwater ray-finned fishes in the family Erythrinidae, the trahiras. The fishes in this genus are found in Central and South America.

== Species ==
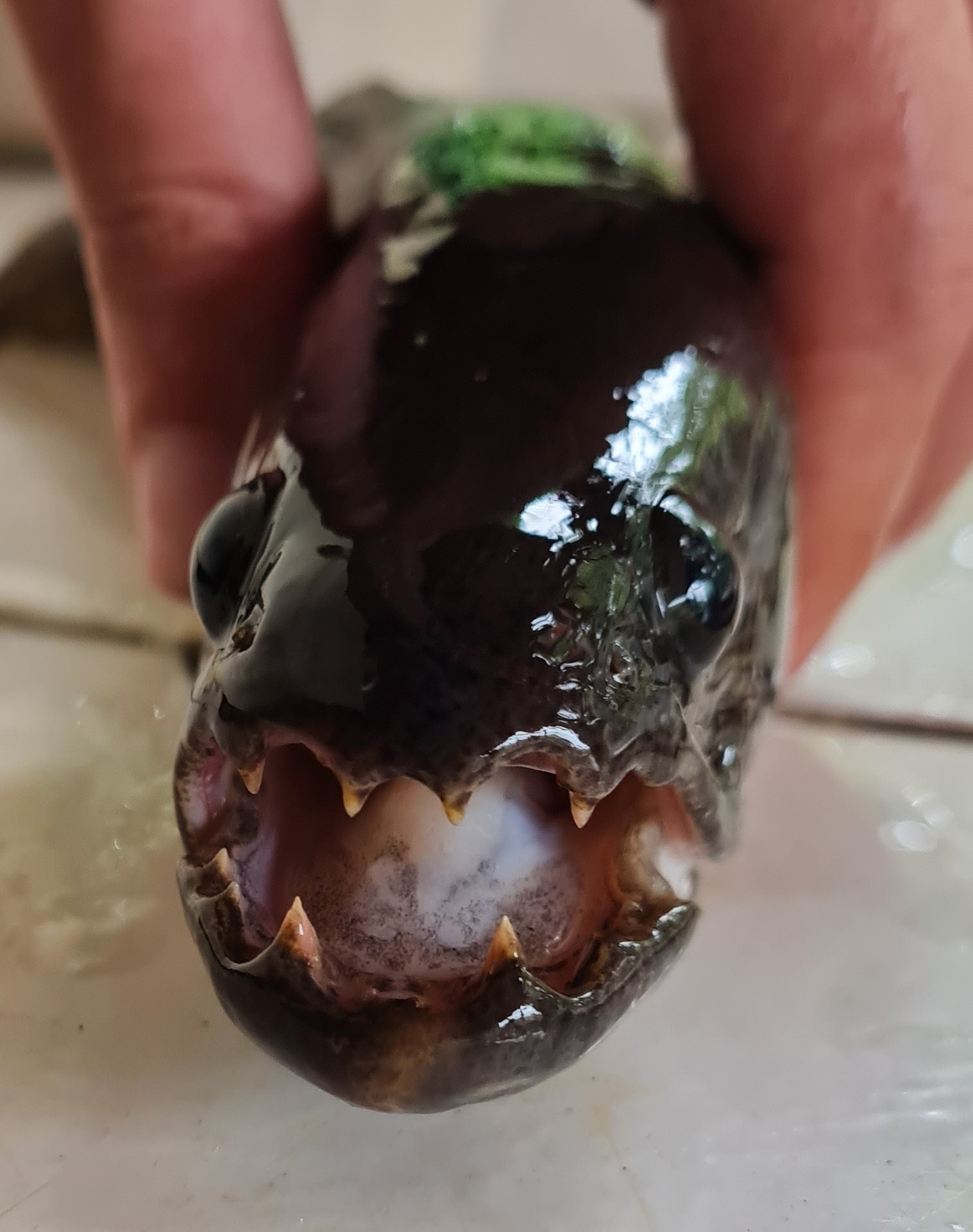
Hoplias malabaricus and its sharp teeth.

Hoplias contains the following valid species:

- Hoplias aimara (Valenciennes, 1847)
- Hoplias argentinensis Rosso, González-Castro, Bogan, Cardoso, Mabragaña, Delpiani et al., 2018
- Hoplias auri Guimarães, Rosso, González-Castro, Souza, Díaz de Astarloa & Rodrigues, 2021
- Hoplias australis Oyakawa & Mattox, 2009
- Hoplias brasiliensis (Spix & Agassiz, 1829)
- Hoplias cazumba Abreu, Pedroza, Oyakawa, Melo, Tchaicka & Piorski, 2025
- Hoplias curupira Oyakawa & Mattox, 2009
- Hoplias guri Bogan, Cardoso, Rosso & Díaz de Astarloa, 2025
- Hoplias intermedius (Günther, 1864)
- Hoplias lacerdae Miranda-Ribeiro, 1908
- Hoplias malabaricus (Bloch, 1794)
- Hoplias maranhensis Guimarães, Rosso, González-Castro, do Nascimento Andrade, Brito, Guimarães, Díaz de Astarloa & Rodrigues, 2025
- Hoplias mbigua Azpelicueta, Benítez, Aichino & Mendez, 2015
- Hoplias microlepis (Günther, 1864)
- Hoplias misionera Rosso, Mabragaña, González-Castro, Delpiani, Avigliano, Schenone & Díaz de Astar, 2016
- Hoplias patana (Valenciennes, 1847) (Nomen dubium)
- Hoplias teres (Valenciennes, 1847)
