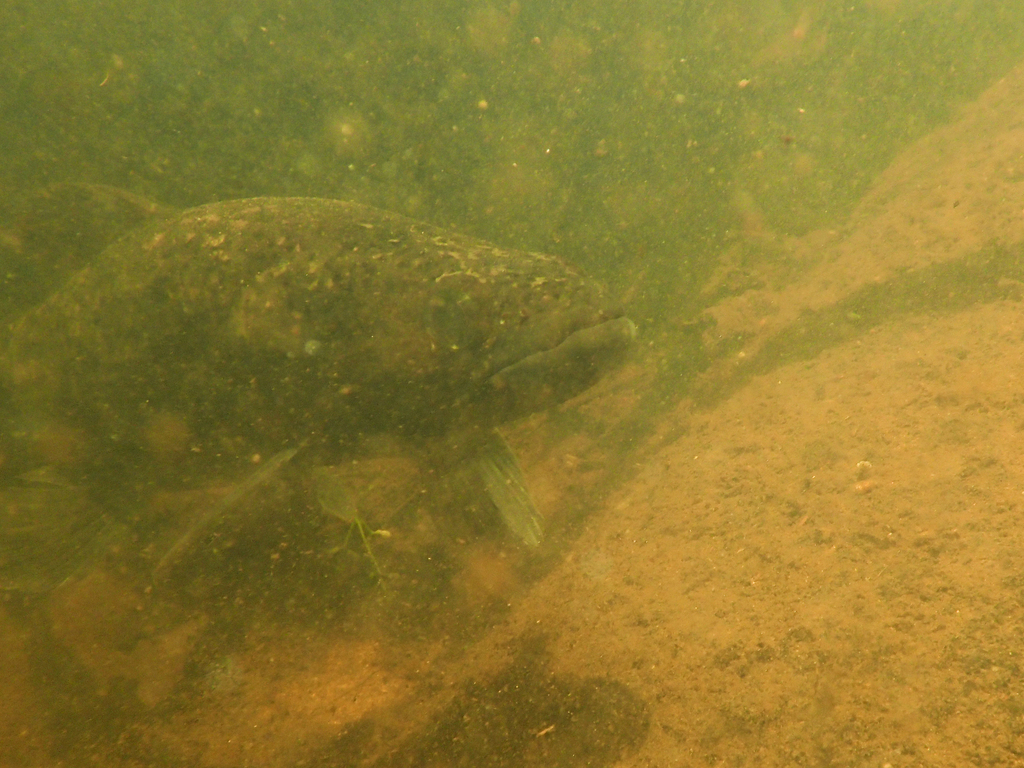

Conservation status
- Least Concern (IUCN 3.1)

Scientific classification
- Kingdom: Animalia
- Phylum: Chordata
- Class: Actinopterygii
- Order: Characiformes
- Family: Erythrinidae
- Genus: Hoplias
- Species: H. curupira

Binomial name
- Hoplias curupira Oyakawa & Mattox, 2009

= Hoplias curupira =

Species of fish

Hoplias curupira, also known as the black wolf-fish, has a wide distribution in the Amazon basin but was described as recently as 2009.

== Taxonomy ==
Hoplias curupira was first formally described in 2009 by the Brazilian zoologists Osvaldo Takeshi Oyakawa & George Mendes Taliaferro Mattox with the type locality given as the Rio Itacaiúas, Caldeirão, Serra dos Carajás, Tocantins basin, Pará State in Brazil. The fish is named after Curupira, a mythical creature of Brazilian folklore that protects the forest and its inhabitants, sometimes taking the form of a small Amerindian child whose feet are turned backwards, making it difficult to follow its tracks.

== Distribution ==
Hoplias curupira has an extensive distribution across the north of South America, Venezuela, Guyana, Surinam and Brazil in the Orinoco, Rio Negro (Amazon) and its tributaries, Rio Tocantins, Rio Xingu and Rio Negro (Amazon).

== Habitat ==
Hoplias curupire is found in large rivers and igarapés, i.e. routes that are navigable by canoes.

== Description ==
Hoplias curupira are medium-sized but relatively bulky in build compared to other Hoplias with a blunt head and broad body. The colour of the fish changes according to mood from a light brown patterning to an almost solid black colouring leading to the common English name of "black wolf-fish". In captivity the average size is 40 cm (16 in) but wild specimens have been reported at up to 75 cm (30 in) in length.

== Habits ==
Like other members of the genus Hoplias, H. curupira is an ambush predator on various insects, larvae, small fishes, shrimps, worms and fruits and is more diurnal than its cogeners. They appear to live as pairs, defending a territory together.
