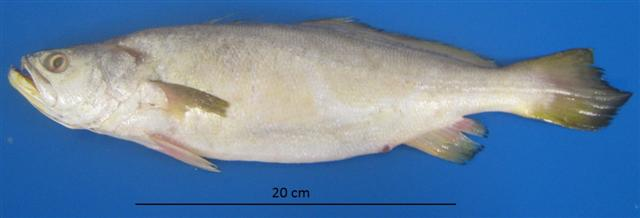
- King weakfish (Macrodon ancylodon)

Scientific classification
- Kingdom: Animalia
- Phylum: Chordata
- Class: Actinopterygii
- Order: Acanthuriformes
- Family: Sciaenidae
- Genus: Macrodon; Schinz, 1822

Type species
- Lonchurus ancylodon Bloch & Schneider 1801

Synonyms
- Ancylodon Oken, 1817; Nomalus Gistel, 1848; Sagenichthys C. Berg, 1895

= Macrodon =

Genus of fishes

Macrodon is a genus of marine ray-finned fishes belonging to the family Sciaenidae, the drums and croakers. These fishes are found in the eastern Pacific and western Atlantic Oceans.

== Taxonomy ==
Macrodon was first proposed as a genus by the Swiss physician and naturalist Heinrich Rudolf Schinz with Lonchurus ancylodon, a species described in 1801 by Marcus Elieser Bloch and Johann Gottlob Theaenus Schneider from Surinam, as its type species. Macrodon was a replacement name for Lorenz Oken's Ancylodon which was preoccupied by Ancylodon Illiger, 1811, a cetacean genus. This genus has been placed in the subfamily Cynoscioninae by some workers, but the 5th edition of Fishes of the World does not recognise subfamilies within the Sciaenidae which it places in the order Acanthuriformes.

== Etymology ==
Macrodon means "large tooth" and is an allusion to the large, backwards curving teeth in front of the upper jaw.

== Species ==
Macrodon contains three species:

- Macrodon ancylodon (Bloch & Schneider, 1801) (King weakfish)
- Macrodon atricauda (Günther, 1880) (Southern King Weakfish)
- Macrodon mordax (Gilbert & Starks, 1904) (Dogteeth weakfish)

== Characteristics ==
Macrodon weakfishes have elongated, compressed bodies. They have moderately large eyes and a large mouth which is diagonal and points upwards with a protruding lower jaw. There are no barbels on the chin and there are two pores, one on each side, of the snout. They have large, pointed teeth with the two in the front of the upper jaw are canine-like and recurved with barbed tips. The preoperculum is soft and has small serrations. The anal fin has a short base with two weakspines and eight or nine soft rays. The rear edge of the caudal fin has a S shape. The scales are small and the soft rayed part of the dorsal fin nd the anal fin are scaled. The maximum published total length of these fishes is 45 cm (18 in) for M. ancylodon and M. atricauda while in M. mordax it is 50 cm (20 in).

== Distribution and habitat ==
Macrodon weakfishes are found off the coasts of southern Central America and South America. Two species are found in the western Atlantic from Venezuela south to northern Argentina. One species, M. mordax is found in the eastern Pacific from Panama to Ecuador. They are coastal fishes of shallow waters including lagoons and estuaries.

== Fisheries and conservation ==
Macrodon weakfishes are either deliberately targeted or caught as bycatch by commercial and artisanal fisheries and they are valued as food fish. The two Atlantic species are classified by the IUCN as Least Concern while M. mordax is Data Deficient.
