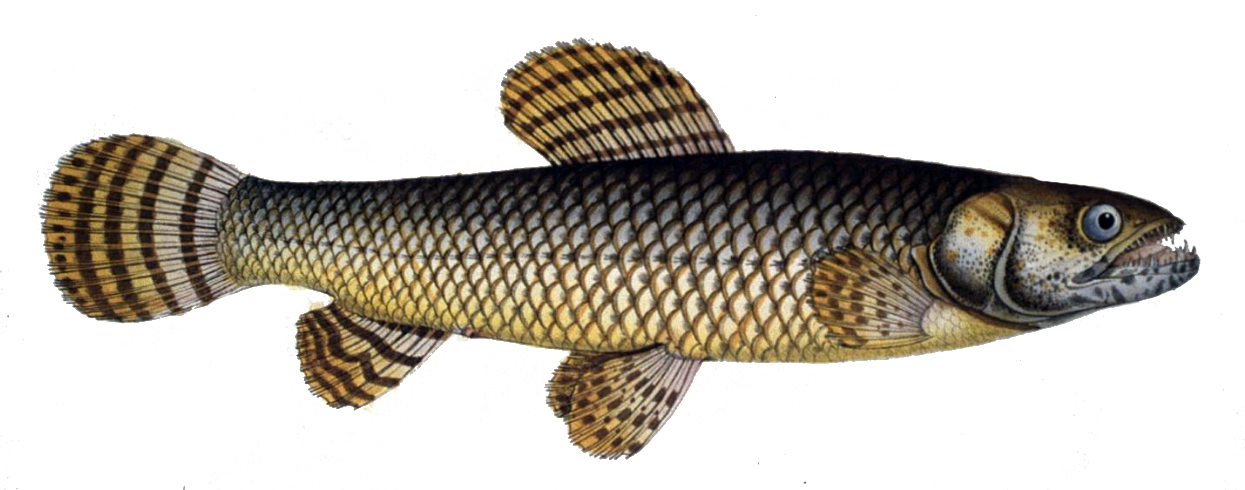
- Hoplias malabaricus

Conservation status
- Least Concern (IUCN 3.1)

Scientific classification
- Kingdom: Animalia
- Phylum: Chordata
- Class: Actinopterygii
- Order: Characiformes
- Family: Erythrinidae
- Genus: Hoplias
- Species: H. malabaricus

Binomial name
- Hoplias malabaricus (Bloch, 1794)

Synonyms
- Esox malabaricus Bloch, 1794; Macrodon malabaricus (Bloch, 1794); Synodus tareira Bloch & Schneider, 1801; Synodus palustris Bloch & Schneider, 1801; Erythrinus trahira Agassiz, 1829; Erythrinus macrodon Spix & Agassiz, 1829; Macrodon tareira Valenciennes, 1847; Macrodon ferox Gill, 1858; Esox tararira Larrañaga, 1923

= Hoplias malabaricus =

Trahira

Species of fish

Hoplias malabaricus, also known as the wolf fish, tiger fish, guabine or trahira, is a predatory Central and South American freshwater ray-finned fish of the characiform family Erythrinidae.

== Description ==
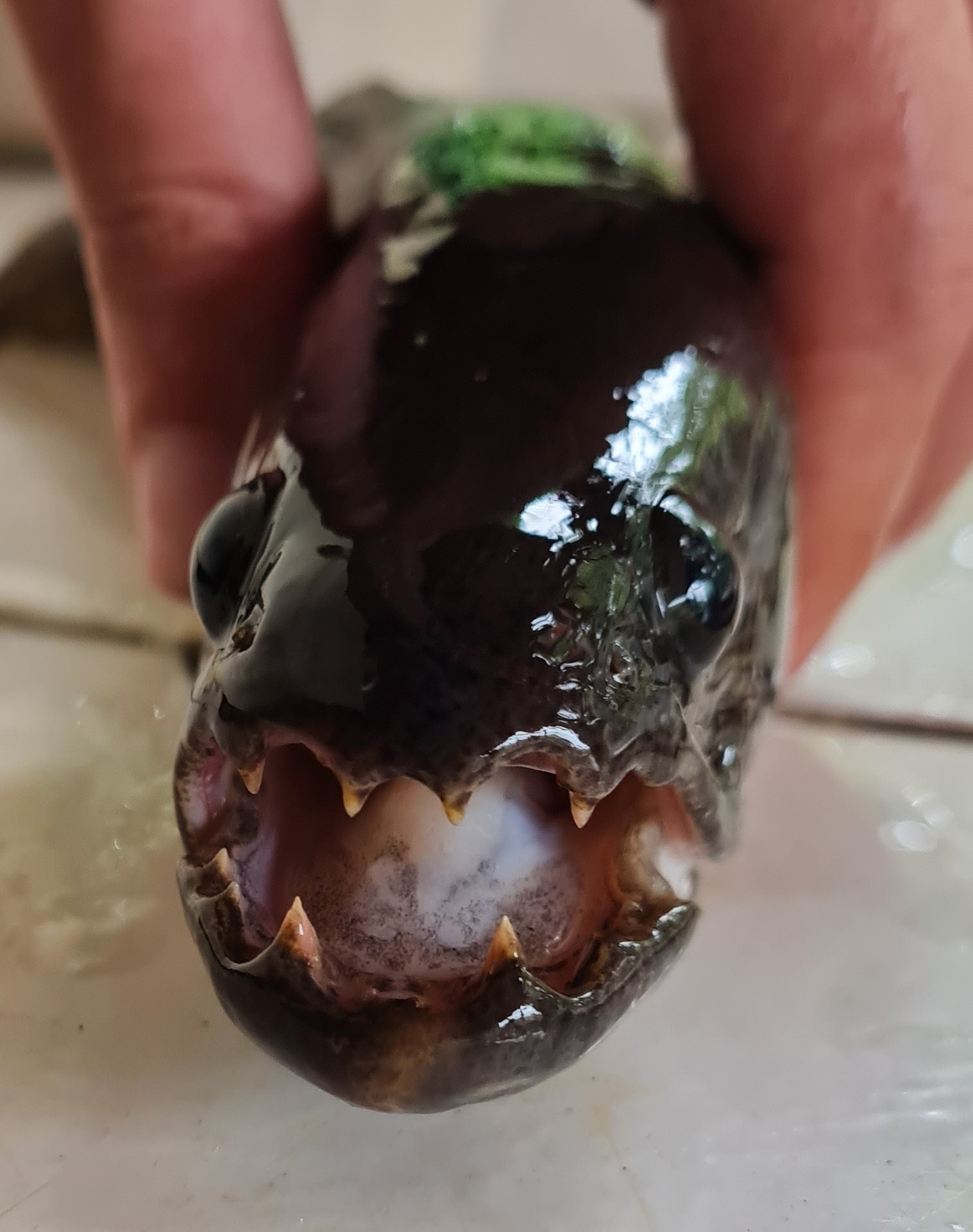
Hoplias malabaricus and its dog-like teeth.

The maximum known length for this species is about 65 centimetres (26 in) and the maximum known weight is about 3.8 kilograms (8.4 lb).

Like other members of the genus Hoplias this species has a cylindrical body shape with a large mouth equipped with prominent teeth. The dog-like teeth have given it some of its common names. Coloration is highly variable but is usually grey-brown with darker vertical stripes or a single horizontal stripe.

== Distribution ==
Southern Central America to Argentina. Found in most river systems and in the following countries; Argentina, Bolivia, Brazil, Colombia, Costa Rica, Ecuador, French Guiana, Guyana, Paraguay, Peru, Suriname, Trinidad and Tobago, Uruguay and Venezuela.

== Biology ==
They occur in a wide range of freshwater habitats from clear, fast flowing, upland streams, to slow, turbid lowland waters, canals, and irrigation and drainage ditches, to shallow, stagnant, and hypoxic lakes and ponds. They are adapted to spending the daylight hours resting in vegetation and are most active during the night. Adults are ambush predators of fish (such as guppies), crustaceans (such as shrimp and crayfish) and mussels; while juveniles prey consists of crustacean and other invertebrate prey. This species spawns in pits located in shallow water and the males guard the nests even after the eggs have hatched.

== Invasive species ==
Hoplias malabaricus are popular in the aquarium trade but are prohibited from being kept in California as a potentially invasive species. H. malabaricus was formerly established in Hillsborough County, Florida, from either deliberate releases or fish farm escapes. Since January 1977 no specimens have been collected or reported; presumably the species was extirpated as result of extremely cold temperatures during that month.

== Gallery ==
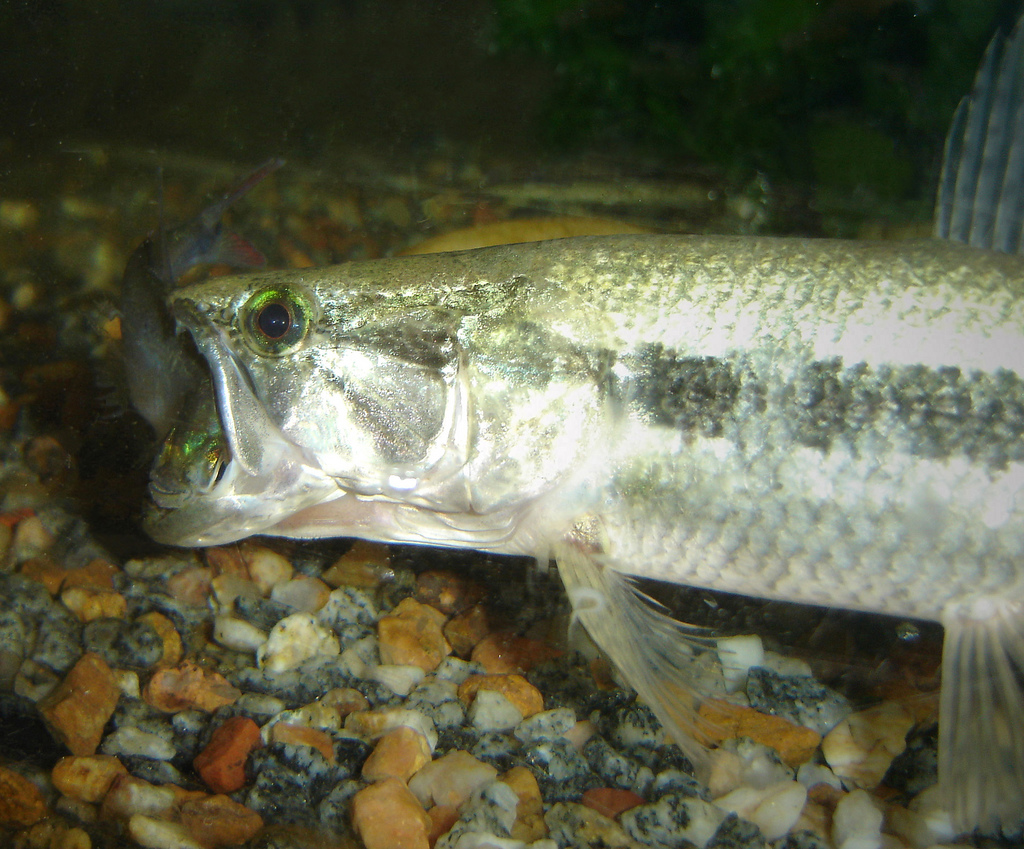

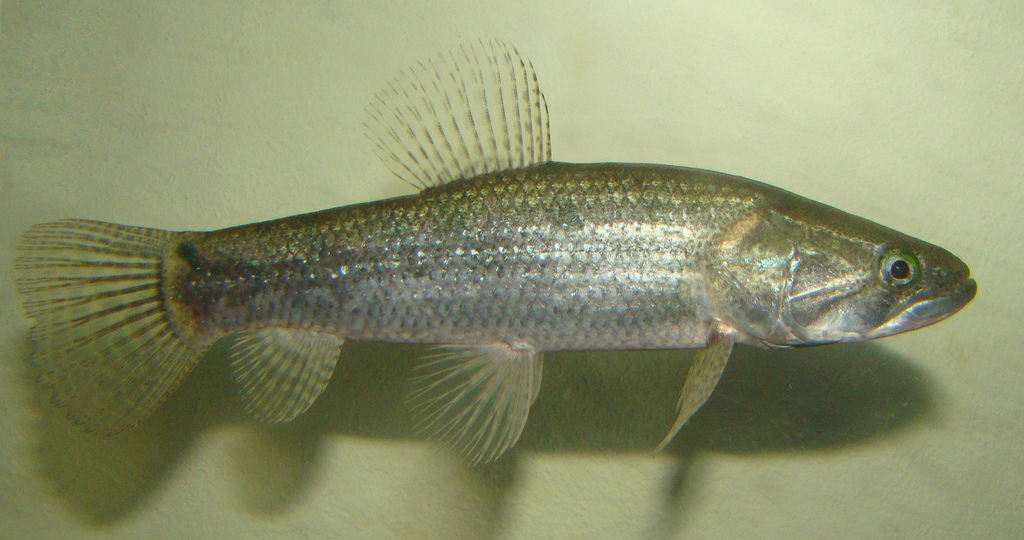

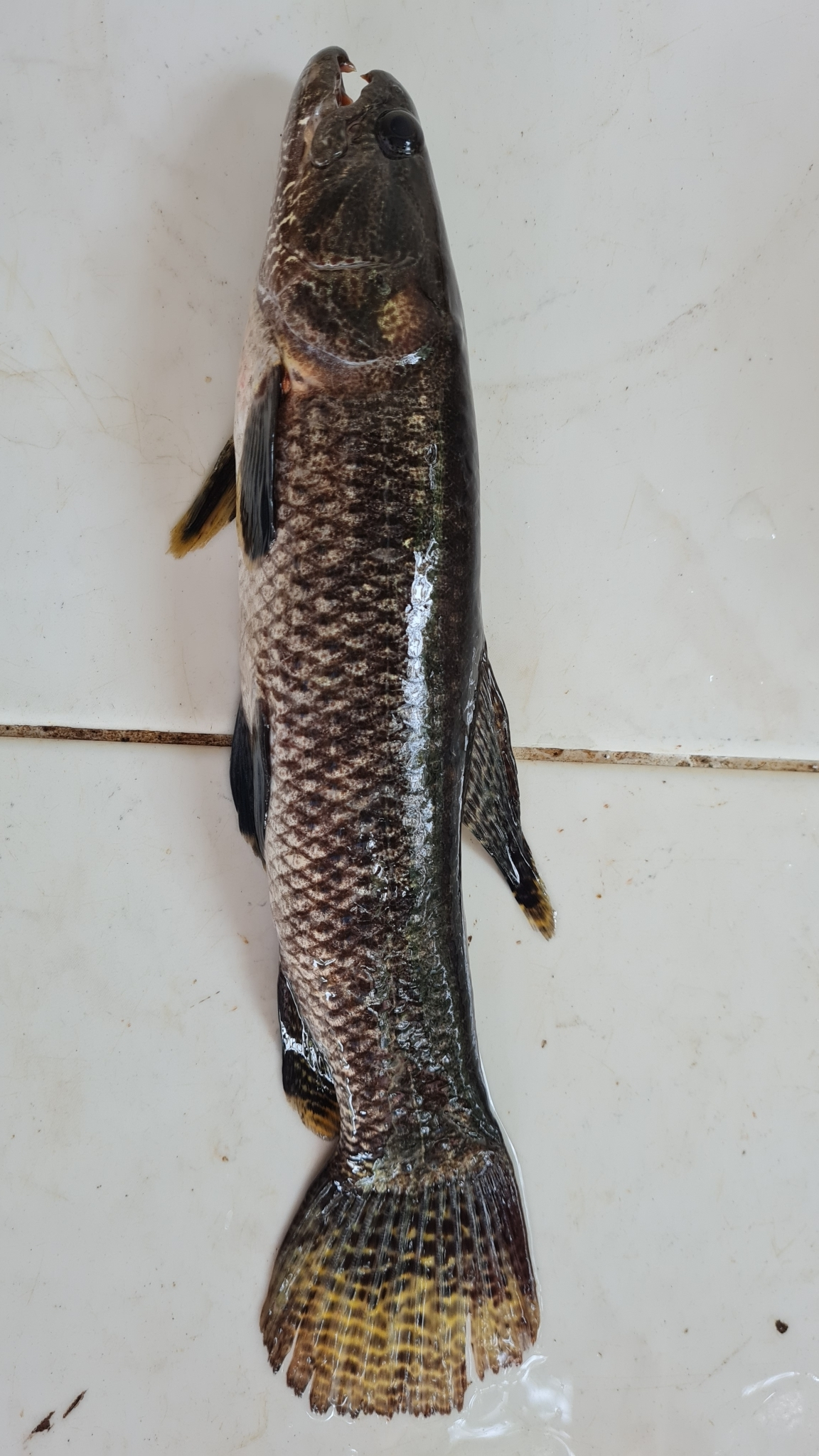

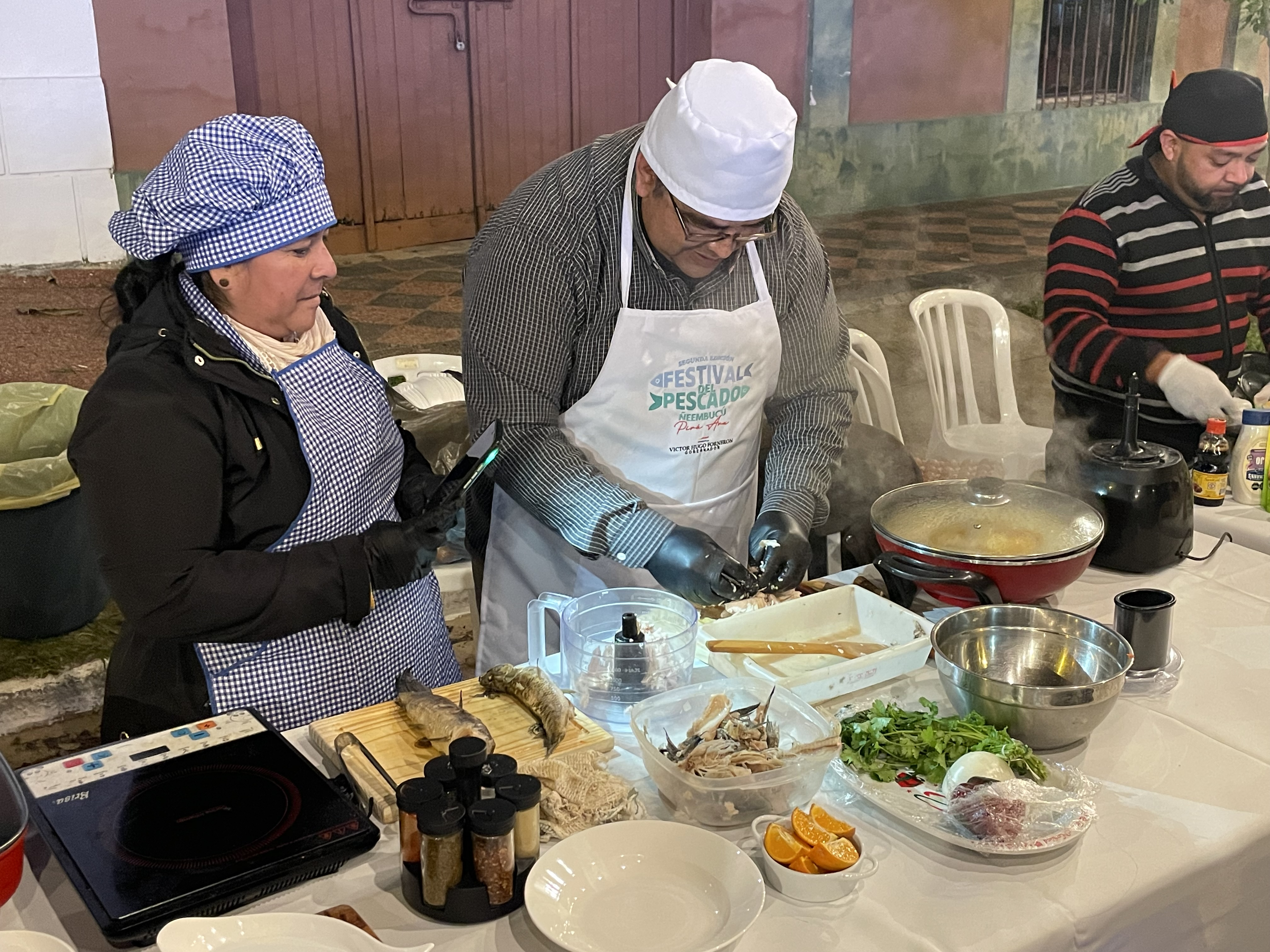
Fish being prepared at a cooking competition in Pilar, Paraguay
