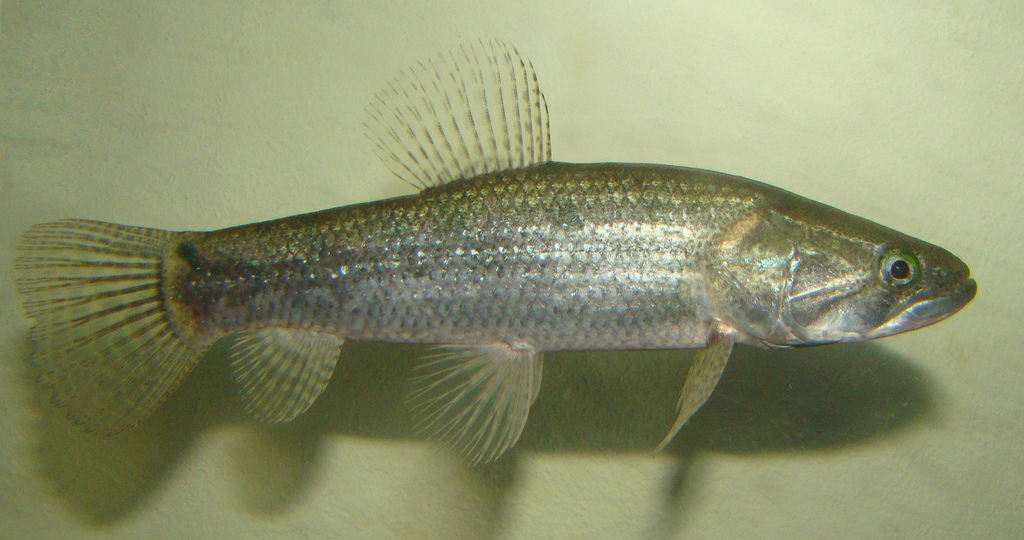
- Hoplias malabaricus

Scientific classification
- Kingdom: Animalia
- Phylum: Chordata
- Class: Actinopterygii
- Order: Characiformes
- Suborder: Characoidei
- Family: Erythrinidae; Valenciennes, 1847.

Genera
- Erythrinus; Hoplerythrinus; Hoplias; †Paleohoplias

= Erythrinidae =

Erythrinidae Temporal range: Middle Miocene to present Possible Early Paleocene record

Family of fishes

The Erythrinidae are a family of fishes found in rivers and other freshwater habitats from Costa Rica south as far as Argentina. They are common and are caught with hooks by fishermen, partially because of their voracious behaviour. They are sometimes called trahiras (also spelled trairas) or tarariras.

The Erythrinidae include cylindrical fish with blunt heads, and prey on other fish. They can reach lengths up to 90 cm (35 in). Some species can breathe air, enabling them to survive in low oxygen conditions; in Hoplerythrinus unitaeniatus this ability is well studied. Some may even be able to move over land between ponds.

The earliest definitive remains of the family are of Hoplias from the Middle Miocene of Colombia. Potential fossil remains are known from the Early Paleocene-aged Tenejapa-Lacandón Formation of Mexico. The three genera in this family appear to have diverged from one another over the Paleogene. However, most species within the family are relatively young, their evolution influenced by major tectonic changes in South America over the Neogene.

== Genera ==
The 16 species are contained in extant (living) genera, plus another extinct species in a separate genus:

- Erythrinus Scopoli, 1777
- Hoplerythrinus Gill, 1896
- Hoplias Gill, 1903 - giant trahiras
- †Paleohoplias Bocquentin & Negri, 2003 (fossil; Neogene of Brazil)
