= Fish measurement =

Measuring of individual fish and various parts of their anatomies

Fish and various parts of their anatomies are measured for data used in many areas of ichthyology, including taxonomy and fishery biology.

== Overall length ==
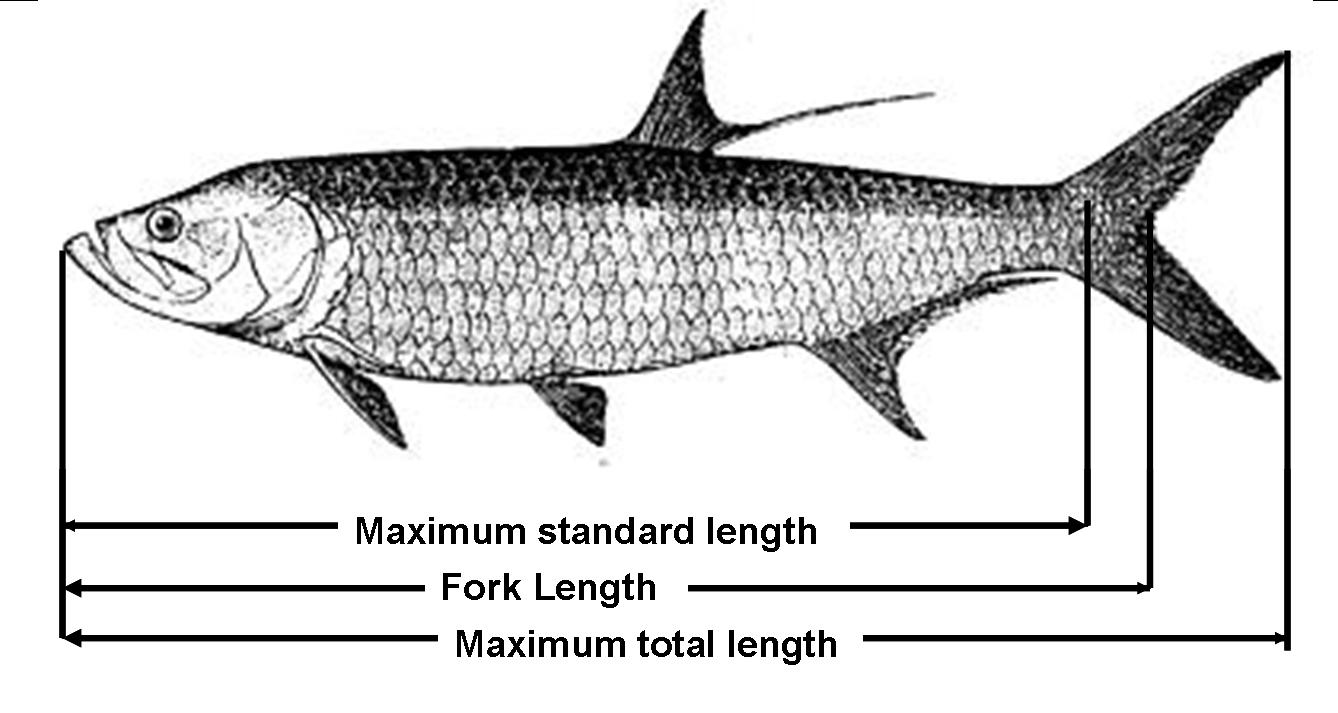
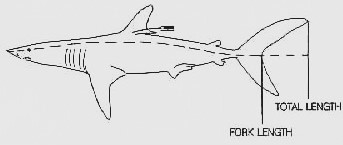
Examples of fish length measurements. For standard weight equations, the total length is used. The fishes depicted are a tarpon (top) and a requiem shark.

Standard length (SL) is the length of a fish measured from the tip of the snout to the posterior end of the last vertebra or to the posterior end of the midlateral portion of the hypural plate. This measurement excludes the length of the caudal (tail) fin.

Total length (TL) is the length of a fish measured from the tip of the snout to the tip of the longer lobe of the caudal fin, usually measured with the lobes compressed along the midline. It is a straight-line measure, not measured over the curve of the body.

Standard length measurements are used with Teleostei (most bony fish), while total length measurements are used with Myxini (hagfish), Petromyzontiformes (lampreys) and usually Elasmobranchii (sharks and rays), as well as some other fishes.

Total length measurements are used in slot limit and minimum landing size regulations.

Fishery biologists often use a third measure in fishes with forked tails, called fork length (FL), the length of a fish measured from the tip of the snout to the end of the middle caudal fin rays, and is used in fishes in which it is difficult to tell where the vertebral column ends.

== Fin lengths and eye diameter ==
Other possible measurements include the lengths of various fins, the lengths of fin bases and the diameter of the eye.

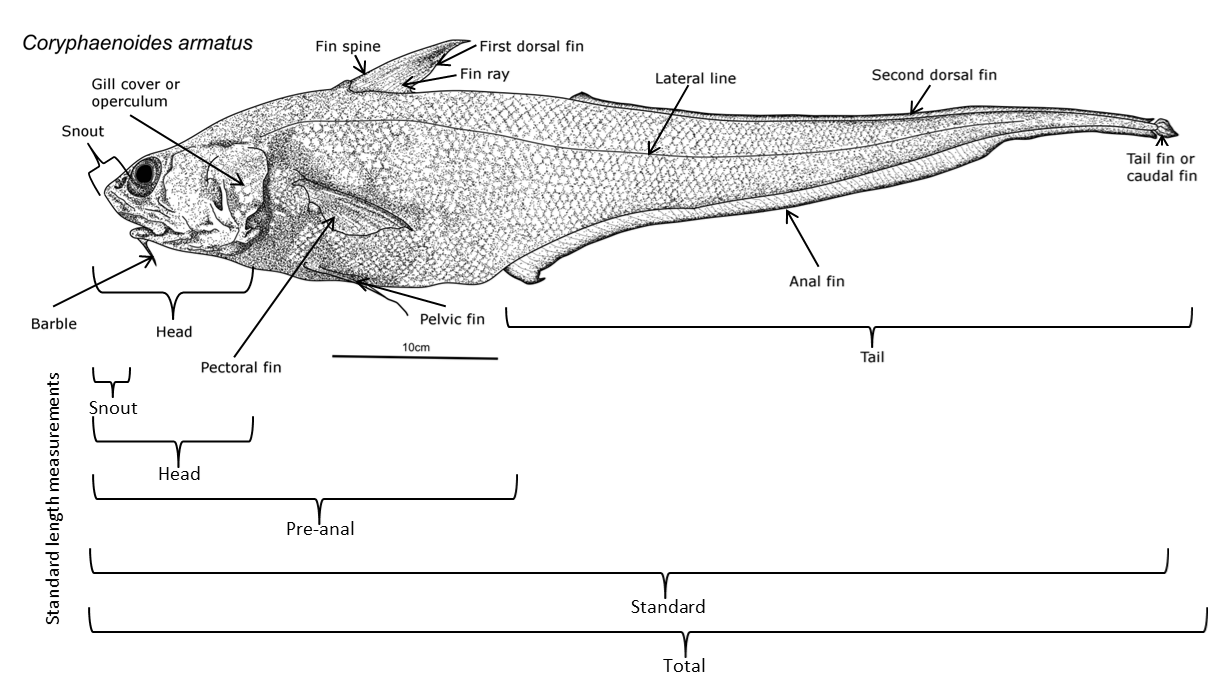
Abyssal grenadier

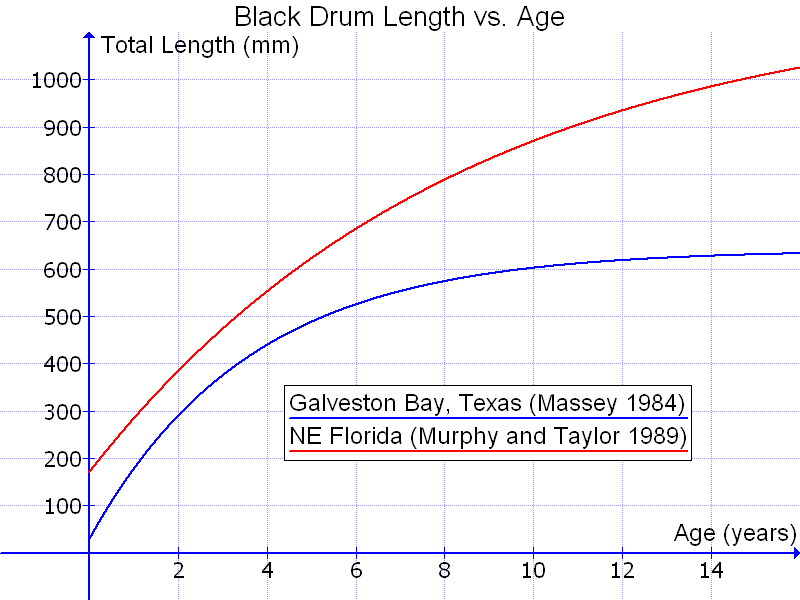
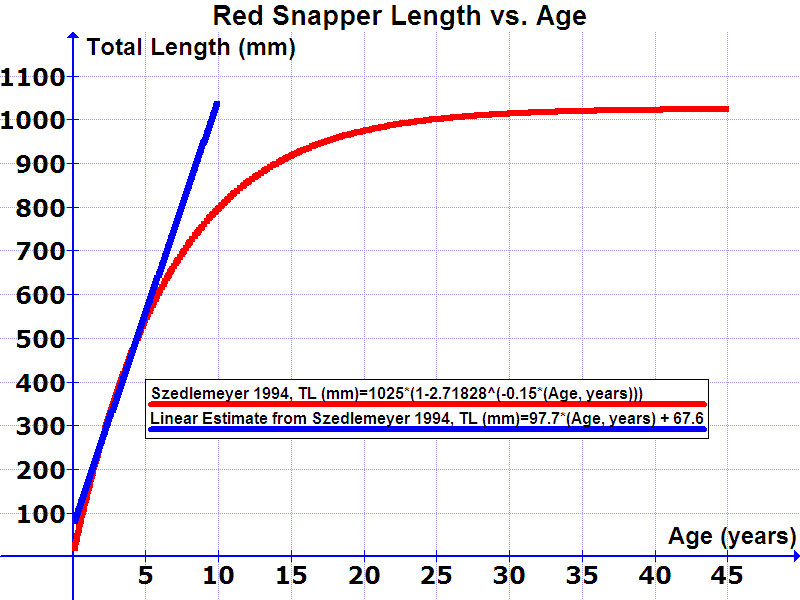
Two graphs correlating total length (TL) with age of black drum and red snapper.

== See also ==
- Ichthyology terms
- Standard weight in fish
