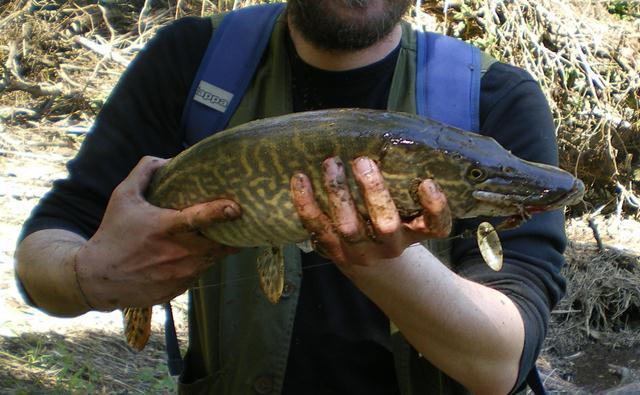

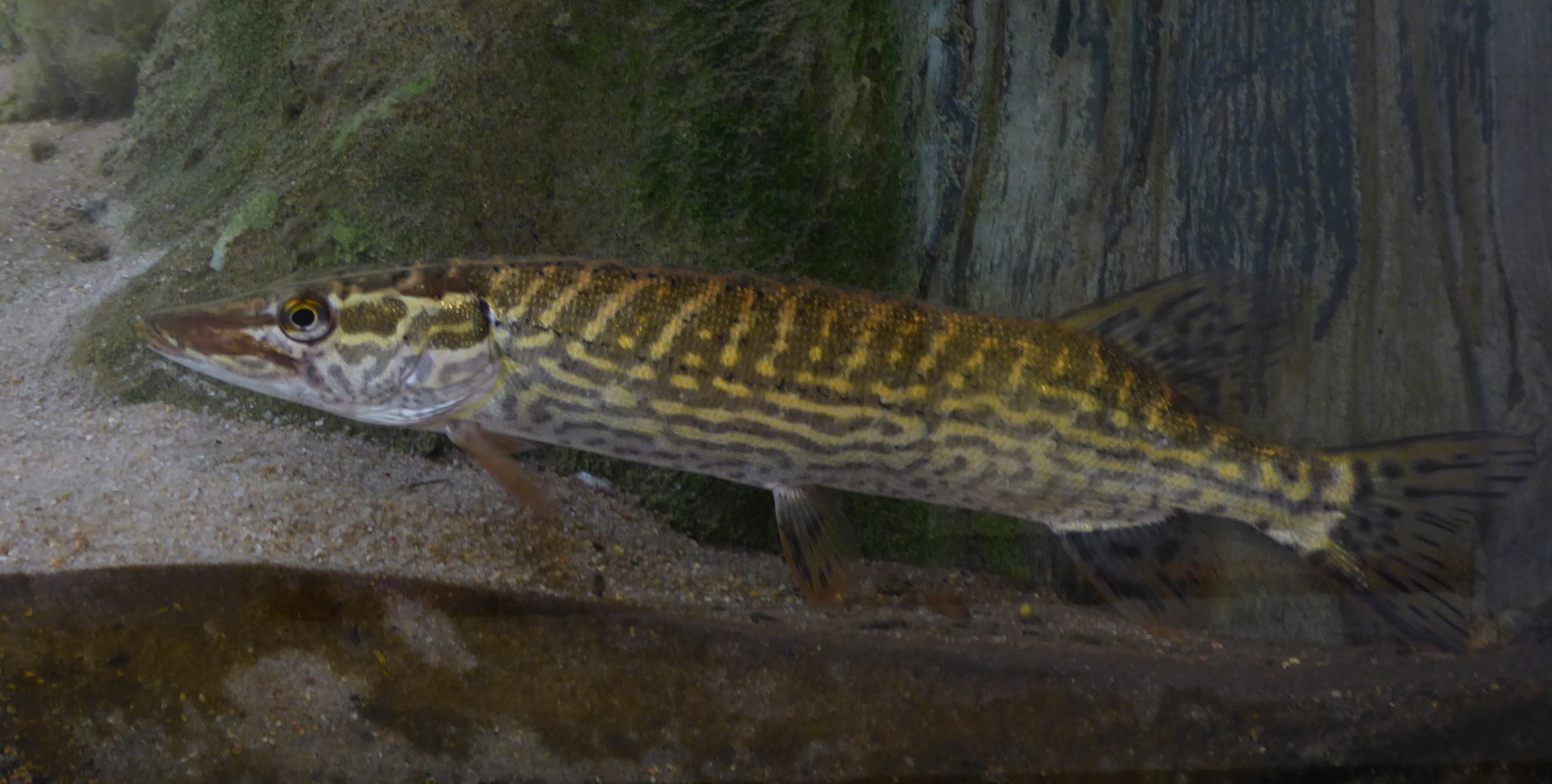

Conservation status
- Vulnerable (IUCN 3.1)

Scientific classification
- Kingdom: Animalia
- Phylum: Chordata
- Class: Actinopterygii
- Order: Salmoniformes
- Family: Esocidae
- Genus: Esox
- Species: E. cisalpinus

Binomial name
- Esox cisalpinus Bianco & Delmastro, 2011

Synonyms
- Esox flaviae Lucentini et al. 2011

= Esox cisalpinus =

Southern pike

Species of fish

Esox cisalpinus, the southern pike or cisalpine pike, is a species of freshwater fish known from central and northern Italy, southeastern France and Switzerland, and it might also occur in the western Balkans. It has traditionally been considered a southern European variant of the widespread northern pike (Esox lucius), but was described as a separate species in 2011. Like the northern pike, southern pike are an important species for recreational fisheries and for its role as a top predator in freshwater ecosystems.

== Taxonomy ==
Esox cisalpinus was distinguished from Esox lucius (northern pike) and described scientifically as a new species in 2011 independently by two research groups. The description by Bianco & Delmastro was printed earlier, and the name Esox cisalpinus is therefore accepted, whereas the alternative name published somewhat later by Lucentini et al., Esox flaviae, is considered a junior synonym.

Lucentini et al. explicitly tested the hypothesis that the different phenotypes of the pike, geographically isolated in Europe, represent two different evolutionary entities. They analysed phenotypic and genetic differences, e.g. in the skin colour pattern and in meristic characters such as the number of scales in the lateral line, which distinguish the two species. They applied a coalescent-based approach to mtDNA phylogeny and evaluated the degree of historical admixture, testing overall genetic differences from amplified fragment length polymorphism (AFLP). The Italian southern pike turned out distinct from the northern pike, whose range extends from central and northern Europe across Asia to North America.

The authors recommend stopping the stocking of pike in southern Europe using northern pike from other European countries, as this could greatly impact the survival of this newly discovered species in its native range.

== Description ==
Esox cisalpinus shows a variety of color patterns, consisting primarily of vertical, horizontal, diagonal or stellate stripe patterns, with dark markings on a lighter background. A color variant with lighter round spots on a darker background, which is almost ubiquitous among northern Esox lucius populations, also occurs. This is believed to have been introduced through interbreeding with European pike, due to being encountered primarily in areas where pike have been restocked from elsewhere in Europe and not being recorded to occur before the beginning of the restocking programs. Overall, stripes tend to be slanted and well-marked in juveniles, but undergo anastomosis and develop into a reticulated pattern in adults alongside a darkening of the body from whitish to green. E. cisalpinus also has a lower number of lateral line scales than E. lucius, averaging 92-107 to the northern species' 105-148, and four submandibular pores per side of the jaw instead of five.

== Distribution ==
The southern pike is distributed primarily in northern and central Italy, where its native range centers around Veneto, Emilia-Romagna, Tuscany and Lazio. Commercial stocking has introduced it to other areas of Italy, often alongside E. lucius. Historically recovered specimens from southeastern France and Lake Geneva have also been assigned to this species.

E. cisalpinus has also been introduced to areas outside of its native range. Italian pike populations have historically provided the majority of specimens exported to Spain, Portugal, Algeria, Ethiopia, Madagascar, Morocco, and Tunisia.

== Behavior and ecology ==
Southern pike, similarly to other Esox species, inhabit still or slow-flowing bodies of water with high visibility and dense aquatic vegetation. They are predators of other fish, as well as frogs and crayfish, and are known to engage in cannibalism. Central Italian populations spawn in February and March, while Northern Italian ones spawn in March and April. Males begin reproducing at one year of age, while females begin at two years.
