= Proteocephalidae =

Scientific classification
- Kingdom: Animalia
- Phylum: Platyhelminthes
- Class: Cestoda
- Order: Onchoproteocephalidea
- Family: Proteocephalidae

Family of flatworms

Proteocephalidae is a diverse family tapeworms with nearly 300 recognized species in 66 genera and 13 subfamilies, whose species are found in every continent. They are mainly parasites of siluriforms and other freshwater fishes, but also parasitize reptiles and amphibians. A typical proteocephalid life cycles include planktonic crustaceans, and small fish as intermediate hosts.

== Subfamilies and Genera ==
- Family Proteocephalidae
  - Subfamily Acanthotaeniinae Freze, 1963
    - Acanthotaenia von Linstow, 1903. Contains some 8 species of cestodes described from monitor lizards of the genus Varanus from India, Australia and the Philippines. As well as, Acanthotaenia overstreeti Brooks & Schmidt, 1978 from the rhinoceros iguana (Cyclura cornuta); Puerto Rico, and Acanthotaenia pythonis Wahid, 1968 described from a green tree python (Morelia viridis) at the London Zoo.
    - Australotaenia de Chambrier & de Chambrier, 2010. Contains 3 species that parasitize hylid frogs in Australia and a snake.
    - Kapsulotaenia Freze, 1965. Contains 6 species described from monitor lizards of the genus Varanus from Australia, Papua New Guinea, and Africa, including Kapsulotaenia sandgroundi (Carter, 1943) from the komodo dragon (Varanus komodoensis).
    - Rostellotaenia Freze, 1963. Contains 3 species parasitizing the nile monitor (Varanus niloticus) in North Africa and the Bengal monitor (Varanus bengalensis) in India.
    - Vandiermenia de Chambrier & de Chambrier, 2010; is a monotypic genus that contains Vandiermenia beveridgei described from the red-bellied black snake (Pseudechis porphyriacus) in Australia.
  - Subfamily Corallobothriinae Freze, 1965
    - Corallobothrium Fritsch, 1886; monotypic genus containing Corallobothrium solidum Fritsch, 1886 described from the Electric catfish (Malapterurus electricus) from North Africa.
    - Corallotaenia Freze, 1965; contains 3 species described from the brown bullhead (Ameiurus nebulosus) in USA and Canada.
    - Essexiella Scholz, de Chambrier, Mariaux & Kuchta, 2011; is a monotypic genus containing Essexiella fimbriata described from the channel catfish (Ictalurus punctatus) from the USA.
    - Megathylacoides Jones, Kerley & Sneed, 1956; contains 6 species occurring in The flathead catfish (Pylodictis olivaris), The brown bullhead (Ameiurus nebulosus) and the blue catfish (Ictalurus furcatus) among others in the US and Mexico.
    - Megathylacus Woodland, 1934; contains two species found in the gilded catfish or jau (Zungaro zungaro) and the Spotted sorubim (Pseudoplatystoma corruscans) in Brazil.
    - Paraproteocephalus Chen, 1962 is a monotypic genus containing Paraproteocephalus parasiluri described from the Amur catfish (Parasilurus asotus) from Russia.
    - Sciadocephalus Diesing, 1850 is a monotypic genus containing Sciadocephalus megalodiscus Diesing, 1850 described from the tucanare peacock bass (Cichla monoculus) in Brazil.
  - Subfamily Endorchiinae Woodland, 1934
    - Endorchis Woodland, 1934 is genus containing 2 species, Endorchis piraeeba Woodland, 1934 described from the giant catfish of the amazon or Paraiba (Brachyplatystoma filamentosum) and Endorchis auchenipteri de Chambrier & Vaucher, 1999 from the driftwood catfish (Auchenipterus osteomystax) from Paraguay.
  - Subfamily Ephedrocephalinae Mola, 1929
    - Ephedrocephalus Diesing, 1850 is a monotypic genus currently containing Ephedrocephalus microcephalus Diesing, 1850 described from the redtail catfish (Phractocephalus hemioliopterus) in Brazil.
  - Subfamily Gangesiinae Mola, 1929
    - Electrotaenia Nybelin, 1942 is a monotypic genus currently containing Electrotaenia malapteruri (Fritsch, 1886) from the electric catfish (Malapterurus electricus) from Egypt.
    - Gangesia Woodland, 1924 is a genus containing 8 recognized species parasitising catfish in south and east Asia, they include Gangesia margolisi Shimazu, 1994 from giant Lake Biwa catfish (Silurus biwaensis) in Japan, Gangesia oligonchis Roitman & Freze, 1964 from the yellowhead catfish (Tachysurus fulvidraco) from Russia, Gangesia vachai (Gupta & Parmar, 1988) described from the wallago catfish (Wallago attu) from India.
    - Pangasiocestus Scholz & de Chambrier, 2012 is a monotypic genus which contains Pangasiocestus romani Scholz & de Chambrier, 2012 from the Black-spotted catfish (Pangasius larnaudii) from Cambodia.
    - Ritacestus de Chambrier, Scholz, Ash & Kar, 2011 is a monotypic genus which contains Ritacestus ritaii (Verma, 1926) described from the Rita bagrid catfish (Rita rita) from India.
    - Silurotaenia Nybelin, 1942 is monotypic genus containing Silurotaenia siluri (Batsch, 1786) parasite of the Wels catfish (Silurus glanis) in Europe.
    - Vermaia Nybelin, 1942 is a monotypic genus with Vermaia pseudotropii (Verma, 1928) described from the Garua bachcha (Clupisoma garua) from India.
  - Subfamily Marsypocephalinae Woodland, 1933
    - Marsypocephalus Wedl, 1861 is a genus that contains around 5 species of tapeworms that have been described from airbreathing African catfish of the genus Heterobranchus and Clarias from Egypt, Sierra Leone, Sudan and Lake Tanganyika.
  - Subfamily Monticelliinae Mola, 1929
    - Ageneiella de Chambrier & Vaucher, 1999. Is a monotypic genus which includes Ageneiella brevifilis de Chambrier & Vaucher, 1999 described from the driftwood catfish (Ageneiosus brevifilis) from Paraguay.
    - Chambriella Rego, Chubb & Pavanelli, 1999 currently contains Chambriella megacephala (Woodland, 1934) described from the firewood catfish (Sorubimichthys planiceps) from Brazil.
    - Choanoscolex La Rue, 1911 is a monotypic genus containing Choanoscolex abscisus (Riggenbach, 1895) from the Spotted sorubim (Pseudoplatystoma corruscans) from Paraguay.
    - Goezeella Fuhrmann, 1916, is a genus currently accommodates two species, namely Goezeella siluri Fuhrmann, 1916 from the blue whale catfish (Cetopsis coecutiens) from Brazil, and Goezeella danbrooksi de Chambrier, Rego & Mariaux, 2004 described from the driftwood catfish (Ageneiosus caucanus) from Colombia.
    - Manaosia Woodland, 1935. This monotypic genus contains Manaosia bracodemoca Woodland, 1935, which parasitizes the duckbill catfish (Sorubim lima) in Brazil.
    - Monticellia La Rue, 1911 is genus containing 8 species of tapeworms described from freshwater fishes in South America and Mexico. It includes Monticellia ophisterni Scholz, de Chambrier & Salgado-Maldonado, 2001 described from the Swamp eel (Ophisternon aenigmaticum) from Mexico.
    - Regoella Arredondo, de Chambrier & Gil de Pertierra, 2013. Is a monotypic genus that contains Regoella brevis described from the Barred Sorubim (Pseudoplatystoma fasciatum) from Argentina.
    - Riggenbachiella Alves, de Chambrier, Luque & Scholz, 2017 contains two species, namely, Riggenbachiella amazonense Alves, de Chambrier, Luque & Scholz, 2017 described from the firewood catfish (Sorubimichthys planiceps) from Peru, and Riggenbachiella paranaensis (Pavanelli & Rego, 1989) from the porthole shovelnose catfish (Hemisorubim platyrhynchos) from Brazil.
    - Spasskyellina Freze, 1965 is a genus that contains three species including Spasskyellina lenha (Woodland, 1933) the firewood catfish (Sorubimichthys planiceps) from Brazil.
    - Spatulifer Woodland, 1934 is a genus that contains three species including Spatulifer surubim Woodland, 1934 described from the tiger sorubim (Pseudoplatystoma tigrinum) in Brazil.
    - Subfamily Nupeliinae Pavanelli & Rego, 1991
    - Nupelia Pavanelli & Rego, 1991 is a genus currently containing the species Nupelia portoriquensis Pavanelli & Rego, 1991 from the duckbill catfish (Sorubim lima) from Brazil, and Nupelia tomasi de Chambrier & Vaucher, 1999 from the (Trachelyopterus galeatus) in Paraguay.
  - Subfamily Peltidocotylinae Woodland, 1934
    - Amazotaenia de Chambrier, 2001 is a monotypic genus which accommodates Amazotaenia yvettae de Chambrier, 2001 described from the Goliath catfish (Brachyplatystoma capapretum) from Brazil.
    - Jauella Rego & Pavanelli, 1985 is a monotypic genus that contains Jauella glandicephalus Rego & Pavanelli, 1985 described from the gilded catfish (Zungaro jahu) native to Brazil.
    - Luciaella Gil de Pertierra, 2009 is a monotypic genus that contains Luciaella ivanovae Gil de Pertierra, 2009 described from a species of driftwood catfish (Ageneiosus inermis) from Argentina.
    - Mariauxiella de Chambrier & Rego, 1995, is genus that contains two species, Mariauxiella pimelodi de Chambrier & Rego, 1995 described from the ornate pim (Pimelodus ornatus) in Brazil; and Mariauxiella piscatorum de Chambrier & Vaucher, 1999 from the Porthole shovelnose catfish (Hemisorubim platyrhynchos) from Paraguay.
    - Peltidocotyle Diesing, 1850 is a genus containing two species Peltidocotyle rugosa Diesing, 1850 parasitizing the Spotted sorubim (Pseudoplatystoma corruscans) in Brazil and Peltidocotyle lenha Woodland, 1933 described from the firewood catfish (Sorubimichthys planiceps) from Brazil.
  - Subfamily Proteocephalinae Mola, 1929
    - Barsonella de Chambrier, Scholz, Beletew & Mariaux, 2009 is a monotypic genus containing Barsonella lafoni that parasitizes the African sharptooth catfish (Clarias gariepinus) in Ethiopia.
    - Brayela Rego, 1984 is a monotypic genus containing Brayela karuatayi (Woodland, 1934) described from the lince catfish (Platynematichthys notatus) from Brazil.
    - Cairaella Coquille & de Chambrier, 2008 is a monotypic genus containing Cairaella henrii Coquille & de Chambrier, 2008 described from the forest anole lizard (Norops trachyderma) from Ecuador.
    - Cangatiella Pavanelli & dos Santos, 1991 is a genus containing two species, Cangatiella arandasi Pavanelli & Dos Santos, 1991 from the common woodcat (Trachelyopterus galeatus) from Brazil, and Cangatiella macdonaghi (Szidat & Nani, 1951) from the Argentinian silverside (Odontesthes bonariensis) from Argentina.
    - Cichlidocestus de Chambrier, Pinacho-Pinacho, Hernández-Orts, & Scholz, 2017 is a monotypic genus containing Cichlidocestus gillesi de Chambrier, Pinacho-Pinacho, Hernández-Orts, & Scholz, 2017 recently described from the Cichilid (Cichlasoma amazonarum) in Peru, and Cichlidocestus janikae de Chambrier, Pinacho-Pinacho, Hernández-Orts, & Scholz, 2017 described from Nicaragua Cichlid (Hypsophrys nicaraguensis) from Costa Rica.
    - Crepidobothrium Monticelli, 1900 is a genus containing 5 species of tapeworms that parasitize snakes, they include Crepidobothrium gerrardii (Baird, 1860) described from the boa constrictor (Boa constrictor) from South America and Crepidobothrium garzonii de Chambrier, 1988 described from the crossed pit viper (Bothrops alternatus) from Paraguay.
    - Deblocktaenia Odening, 1963 is a monotypic genus containing Deblocktaenia ventosaloculata (Deblock, Rosé & Broussart, 1962) described from the tiny night snake (Ithycyphus miniatus) from Madagascar.
    - Euzetiella de Chambrier, Rego & Vaucher, 1999 is a monotypic genus containing Euzetiella tetraphylliformis de Chambrier, Rego & Vaucher, 1999 described from the gilded catfish (Zungaro jahu) native to Brazil.
    - Frezella Alves, de Chambrier, Scholz & Luque, 2015 is a monotypic genus containing Frezella vaucheri Alves, de Chambrier, Scholz & Luque, 2015 described from a species of driftwood catfish (Tocantinsia piresi) from Brazil.
    - Glanitaenia de Chambrier, Zehnder, Vaucher & Mariaux, 2004 is a monotypic genus containing Glanitaenia osculata (Goeze, 1782) parasite of the Wels catfish (Silurus glanis) in Europe.
    - Macrobothriotaenia Freze, 1965 is a monotypic genus containing Macrobothriotaenia ficta (Meggitt, 1931) described from the sunbeam snake (Xenopeltis unicolor) from Myanmar.
    - Margaritaella Arredondo & Gil de Pertierra, 2012 is a monotypic genus containing Margaritaella gracilis Arredondo & Gil de Pertierra, 2012 described from the cascarudo armored catfish (Callichthys callichthys) from Argentina.
    - Ophiotaenia La Rue, 1911 is one of the largest genera within the Protecephalidae, it contains nearly 90 species which parasitize amphibians, reptiles and birds. Among them Ophiotaenia adiposa Rudin, 1917 described from the African Puff Adder (Bitis arietans) from Cameroon, Ophiotaenia carpathica Sharpilo, Kornyushin & Lisitsina, 1979 described from the northern crested newt (Triturus cristatus) from Ukraine, Ophiotaenia kuantanensis Yeh, 1956 described from the king cobra (Ophiophagus hannah) from India, Ophiotaenia macrobothria Rudin, 1917 described from the painted coral snake (Micrurus corallinus) from Brazil, Ophiotaenia noei Wolffhugel, 1948 from the water helmeted toad (Calyptocephalus gayi) from Chile, Ophiotaenia schultzei (Hungerbühler, 1910) Dickley, 1921 described from the African bullfrog (Pyxicephalus adspersus) from South Africa.
    - Proteocephalus Weinland, 1858 is a species rich genus containing over 70 species which have been described mainly from freshwater fish and a few amphibians. They include Proteocephalus aberrans Brooks, 1978 described from the greater siren (Siren lacertina) in USA, Proteocephalus amphiumicola Brooks, 1978 from the two-toed amphiuma (Amphiuma means) from North America, Proteocephalus australis Chandler, 1935 occurs in the longnose gar (Lepisosteus osseus) in North America, Proteocephalus longicollis (Zeder, 1800) occurs in brown trout (Salmo trutta) in Europe, and Proteocephalus pentastomus (Klaptocz, 1906) described from the Nile bichir (Polypterus bichir) from Sudan.
    - Pseudocrepidobothrium Rego & Ivanov, 2001 is a genus containing 3 species that occur Brazil and Argentina. They include Pseudocrepidobothrium eirasi (Rego & de Chambrier, 1995) and Pseudocrepidobothrium ludovici Ruedi & de Chambrier, 2012 both described from the redtail catfish (Phractocephalus hemioliopterus) from Brazil.
    - Scholzia de Chambrier, Rego & Gil de Pertierra, 2005. Scholzia emarginata (Diesing, 1850) described from the redtail catfish (Phractocephalus hemioliopterus) from Brazil.
    - Tejidotaenia Freze, 1965 is monotypic genus containing Tejidotaenia appendiculatus (Baylis, 1947) described from the golden tegu (Tupinambis teguixin) from Surinam.
    - Thaumasioscolex Cañeda-Guzmán, de Chambrier & Scholz, 2001 is monotypic genus which includes Thaumasioscolex didelphidis Cañeda-Guzmán, de Chambrier & Scholz, 2001 described from the common opossum (Didelphis marsupialis) from Mexico, the only member of the Proteocephalidae which parasitizes a mammal.
    - Travassiella Rego & Pavanelli, 1987 is a monotypic genus containing Travassiella jandia (Woodland, 1934) described from the gilded catfish (Zungaro jahu) native to Brazil.
  - Subfamily Rudolphiellinae Woodland, 1935
    - Rudolphiella Fuhrmann, 1916 is a genus containing 5 species that occur in species of freshwater long-whiskered catfish, they include Rudolphiella piracatinga (Woodland, 1935) from vulture catfish (Calophysus macropterus) from Brazil.
  - Subfamily Sandonellinae Khalil, 1960
    - Sandonella Khalil, 1960 is a monotypic genus currently containing Sandonella sandoni (Lynsdale, 1960) described from the African arowana (Heterotis niloticus) from Sudan
  - Subfamily Testudotaeniinae de Chambrier, Coquille, Mariaux & Tkach, 2009
    - Testudotaenia Freze, 1965 is a monotypic genus currently containing Testudotaenia testudo (Magath, 1924) described from the spiny softshell turtle (Apalone spinifera) from USA.
  - Subfamily Zygobothriinae Woodland, 1933
    - Amphoteromorphus Diesing, 1850 is a genus containing 6 species that parasitize South American Silurids, they include Amphoteromorphus piraeeba Woodland, 1934 described from the Giant Catfish of the Amazon or Paraiba (Brachyplatystoma filamentosum) from Brazil.
    - Brooksiella Rego, Chubb & Pavanelli, 1999 Brooksiella praeputialis (Rego, Santos & Silva, 1974) described from the Blue Whale Catfish (Cetopsis coecutiens) from Brazil.
    - Gibsoniela Rego, 1984 is a genus containing 2 species, Gibsoniela mandube (Woodland, 1935) and Gibsoniela meursaulti de Chambrier & Vaucher, 1999, both species described from the driftwood catfish (Ageneiosus brevifilis) from Brazil.
    - Harriscolex Rego, 1987 is genus containing 3 species that parasitize long-whiskered catfish in Brazil, they include Harriscolex kaparari (Woodland, 1935) parasite of the tiger sorubim (Pseudoplatystoma tigrinum) in Brazil.
    - Houssayela Rego, 1987 is a monotypic genus containing Houssayela sudobim (Woodland, 1935) described from the Paraiba (Pseudoplatystoma fasciatum) from Brazil.
    - Nomimoscolex Woodland, 1934 is a genus that contains some 17 species, mostly parasitizing South American silurids, with the exception of Nomimoscolex touzeti de Chambrier & Vaucher, 1992 described from the Surinam horned frog (Ceratophrys cornuta) from Ecuador.
    - Postgangesia Akhmerov, 1969 is a genus containing two species Postgangesia orientalis Akhmerov, 1969 described from Northern Sheatfish (Silurus soldatovi) from Russia, and Postgangesia inarmata de Chambrier, Al-Kallak & Mariaux, 2003 the giant catfish (Silurus glanis) from Iraq.
    - Vaucheriella de Chambrier, 1987 is a monotypic genus containing Vaucheriella bicheti de Chambrier, 1987 described from the Taczanowski's dwarf boa (Tropidophis taczanowskyi) from Ecuador.
    - Zygobothrium Diesing, 1850 is a monotypic genus contains Zygobothrium megacephalum Diesing, 1850 the redtail catfish, (Phractocephalus hemioliopterus) from Brazil.
