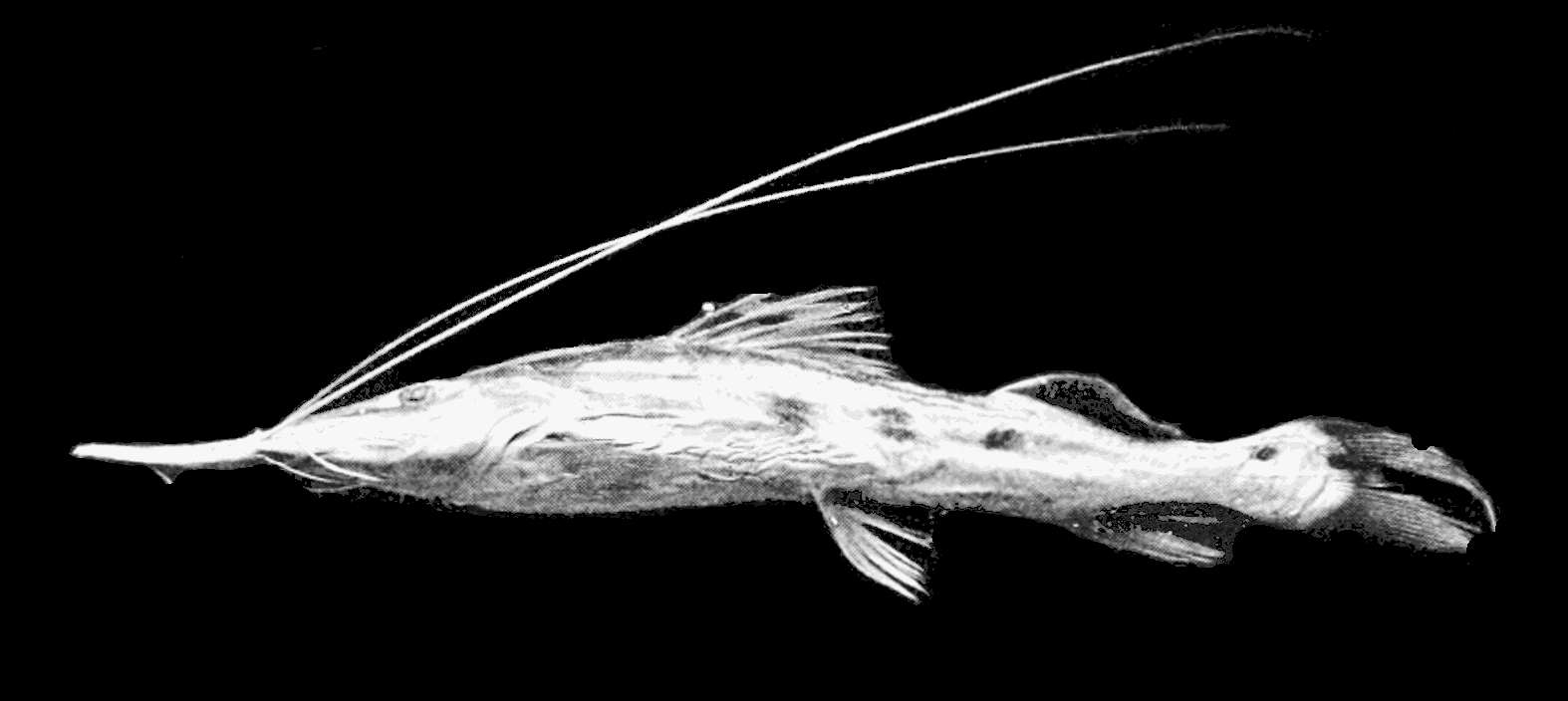
- specimen

Conservation status
- Least Concern (IUCN 3.1)

Scientific classification
- Kingdom: Animalia
- Phylum: Chordata
- Class: Actinopterygii
- Order: Siluriformes
- Family: Pimelodidae
- Genus: Platystomatichthys; Bleeker, 1862
- Species: P. sturio

Binomial name
- Platystomatichthys sturio (Kner, 1858)

Synonyms
- Platystoma sturio Kner, 1857

= Platystomatichthys =

Sturgeon catfish

Genus of fishes

Platystomatichthys sturio is the only species in the genus Platystomatichthys of the catfish (order Siluriformes) family Pimelodidae. It is sometimes called the sturgeon catfish. This species occurs in the Amazon Basin and reaches a length of about 40.0 centimetres (15.7 in) TL. Platystomatichthys is classified under the "Calophysus-Pimelodus clade". Within this clade, it is considered a part of the "Pimelodus-group" of Pimelodids, which also includes Pimelodus, Exallodontus, Duopalatinus, Cheirocerus, Iheringichthys, Bergiaria, Bagropsis, Parapimelodus, Platysilurus, and Propimelodus.
