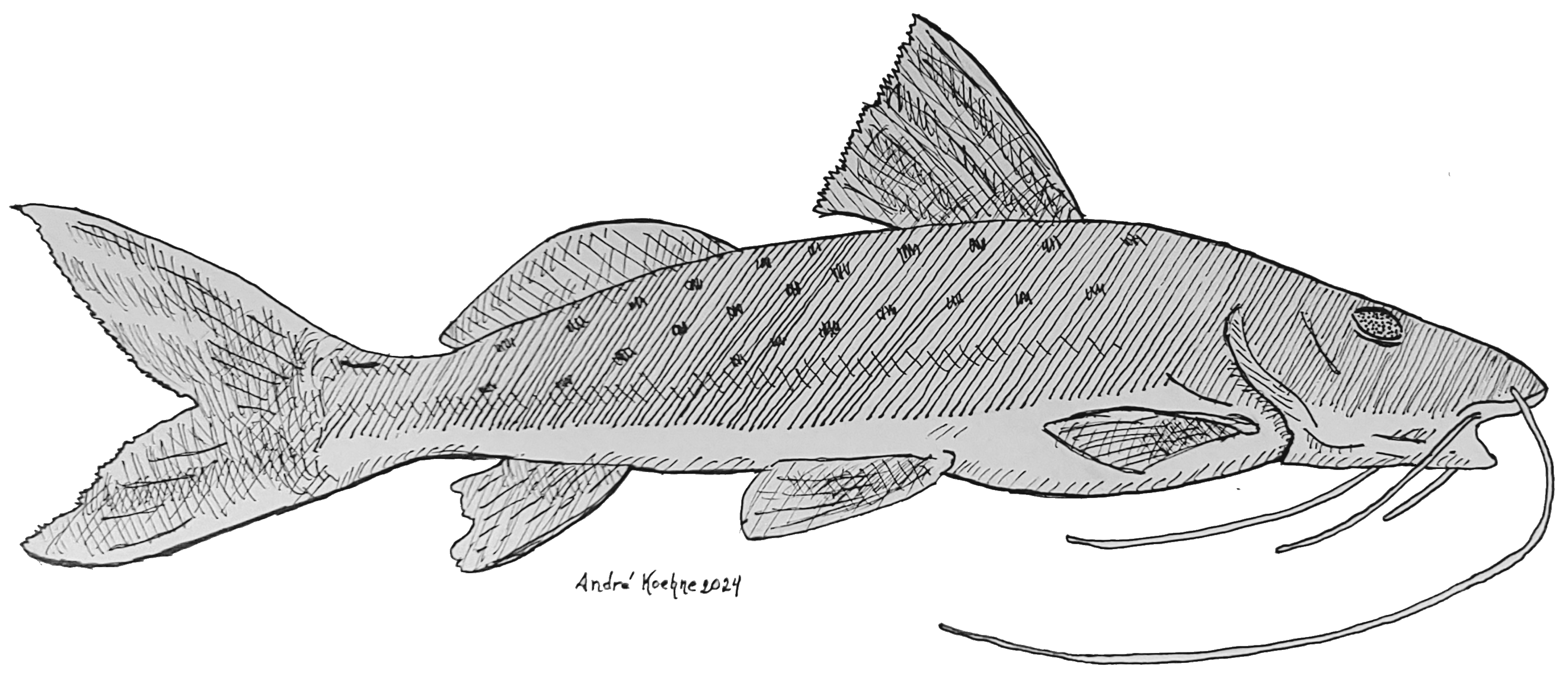
- Duopalatinus emarginatus

Scientific classification
- Kingdom: Animalia
- Phylum: Chordata
- Class: Actinopterygii
- Order: Siluriformes
- Family: Pimelodidae
- Genus: Duopalatinus; C. H. Eigenmann & Eigenmann, 1888

Type species
- Platystoma emarginatum Valenciennes, 1840

= Duopalatinus =

Genus of fishes

Duopalatinus is a small genus of long-whiskered catfishes native to South America.

== Species ==
There are currently two recognized species in this genus:

- Duopalatinus emarginatus (Valenciennes, 1840)
- Duopalatinus peruanus C. H. Eigenmann & Allen, 1942

Duopalatinus is classified under the "Calophysus-Pimelodus clade". Within this clade, it is considered a part of the "Pimelodus-group" of Pimelodids, which also includes Pimelodus, Exallodontus, Cheirocerus, Iheringichthys, Bergiaria, Bagropsis, Parapimelodus, Platysilurus, Platystomatichthys, and Propimelodus.

Duopalatinus species are distributed in South America. D. emarginatus inhabits the São Francisco River basin. D. peruanus is found in the Amazon and Orinoco River basins.

Duopalatinus species grow to about 14–15 centimetres (5.5–5.9 in) SL.
