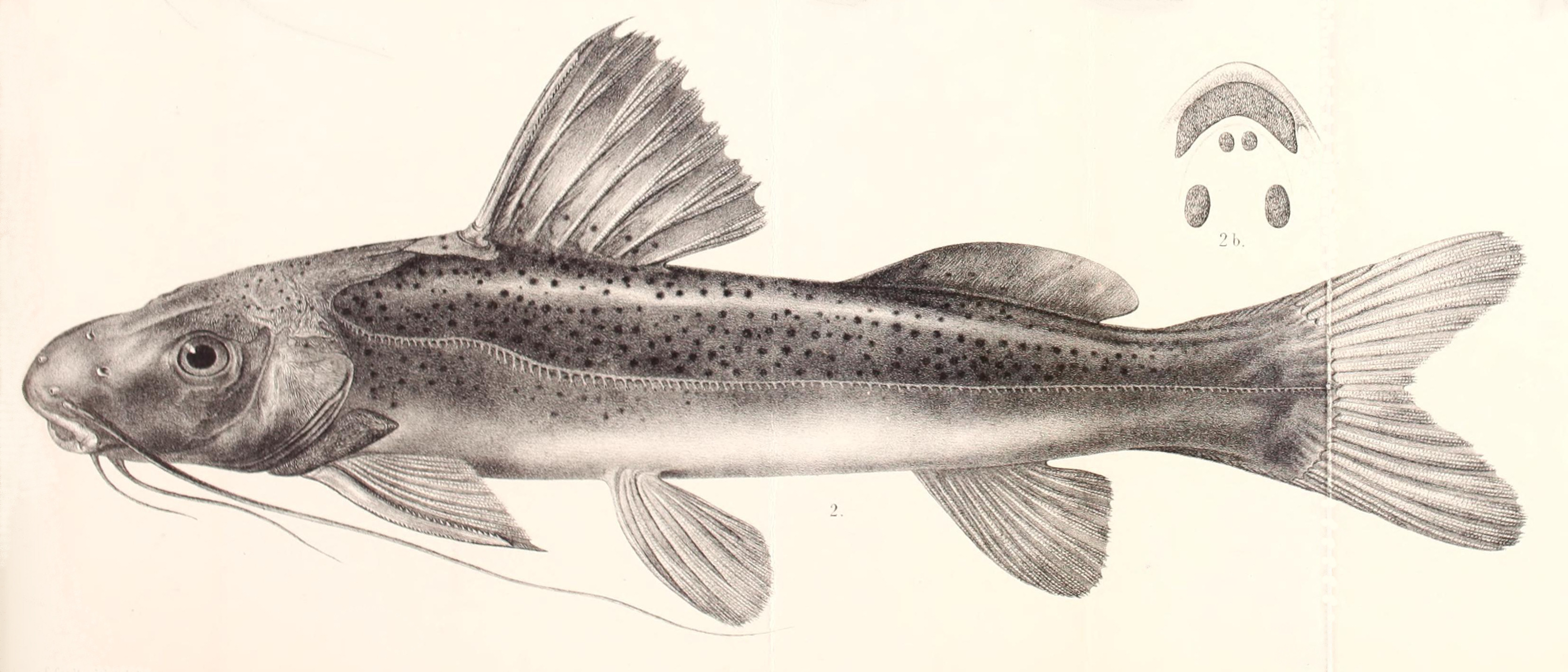
- Bagropsis reinhardti as depicted in 1875

Conservation status
- Least Concern (IUCN 3.1)

Scientific classification
- Kingdom: Animalia
- Phylum: Chordata
- Class: Actinopterygii
- Order: Siluriformes
- Family: Pimelodidae
- Genus: Bagropsis; Lütken, 1874
- Species: B. reinhardti

Binomial name
- Bagropsis reinhardti Lütken, 1874

= Bagropsis =

Species of fish

Bagropsis reinhardti is a species of long-whiskered catfish. This species reaches about 22.7 cm (8.9 in) in standard length and is endemic to Brazil where it is found in the Das Velhas River basin in São Francisco River drainage. It is considered a threatened species by Brazil's Ministry of the Environment.

Bagropsis is classified under the "Calophysus-Pimelodus clade". Within this clade, it is considered a part of the "Pimelodus-group" of Pimelodids, which also includes Pimelodus, Exallodontus, Duopalatinus, Cheirocerus, Iheringichthys, Bergiaria, Parapimelodus, Platysilurus, Platystomatichthys, and Propimelodus.
