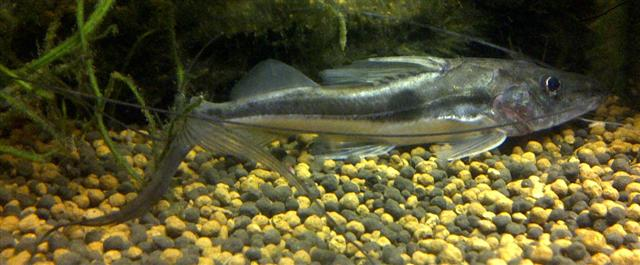
- Platysilurus mucosus

Scientific classification
- Kingdom: Animalia
- Phylum: Chordata
- Class: Actinopterygii
- Order: Siluriformes
- Family: Pimelodidae
- Genus: Platysilurus; Haseman, 1911

= Platysilurus =

Genus of fishes

Platysilurus is a genus of long-whiskered catfishes native to South America.

== Taxonomy ==
Platysilurus is classified under the "Calophysus-Pimelodus clade". Within this clade, it is considered a part of the "Pimelodus-group" of Pimelodids, which also includes Pimelodus, Exallodontus, Duopalatinus, Cheirocerus, Iheringichthys, Bergiaria, Bagropsis, Parapimelodus, Platystomatichthys, and Propimelodus.

== Species ==
There are currently three recognized species in this genus:

- Platysilurus malarmo Schultz, 1944
- Platysilurus mucosus (Vaillant, 1880)
- Platysilurus olallae (Orcés-V. (es), 1977)

== Distribution ==
P. malarmo is distributed in the Lake Maracaibo basin. P. mucosus inhabits the Amazon and Orinoco River basins. P. olallae is found in Ecuador.

== Description ==
P. malarmo reaches 70 centimetres (28 in) SL. P. mucosus grows to a length of at least 20 cm (7.9 in) SL.
