= Propimelodus =

Scientific classification
- Kingdom: Animalia
- Phylum: Chordata
- Class: Actinopterygii
- Order: Siluriformes
- Family: Pimelodidae
- Genus: Propimelodus; Lundberg & Parisi, 2002

Type species
- Pimelodus eigenmanni van der Stigchel, 1946

Genus of fishes

Propimelodus is a genus of South American catfish of the family Pimelodidae.

== Taxonomy ==
The type species of this genus, P. eigenmanni, was first described in 1946 under the genus Pimelodus. In 2002, the genus Propimelodus was described for this species. Shortly after, in 2006, the species P. caesius was described to this genus and in 2007 another new species, P. araguayae was described. Other species will be described in the future.

Propimelodus is classified under the "Calophysus-Pimelodus clade". Within this clade, it is considered a part of the "Pimelodus-group" of Pimelodids, which also includes Pimelodus, Exallodontus, Duopalatinus, Cheirocerus, Iheringichthys, Bergiaria, Bagropsis, Parapimelodus, Platysilurus, and Platystomatichthys.

== Species ==
There are currently four recognized species in this genus:

- Propimelodus araguayae Rocha, de Oliveira & Rapp Py-Daniel, 2007
- Propimelodus caesius Parisi, Lundberg & DoNascimiento, 2006
- Propimelodus eigenmanni (van der Stigchel, 1946)
- Propimelodus lobatus Torrico-Destre, Careaga & Carvajal-Vallejos, 2025

== Distribution ==
P. eigenmanni originate from the lower Amazon River as well as large tributaries such as the Xingu, Trombetas, Jari River, and lower Madeira River in Brazil, and the rivers Kourou and Oyapock in French Guiana. P. caesius has the largest range of the genus. P. caesius is also found in many of these regions, with tributary range including Tocantins, Pará, Jari, Xingu, Trombetas, Madeira, Negro, Purús, Japurá, Juruá, and Içá rivers. P. araguayae is only known from the middle Araguaia River.

== Appearance and anatomy ==
These fish have three pairs of barbels. As in other pimelodids, these whiskers are extremely long; the maxillary barbels extend past the base of the caudal fin. Propimelodus species have a rather long adipose fin. Unlike its congeners, P. araguayae has a black spot on its dorsal fin.

P. eigenmanni grows not much longer than 20 centimetres (8 in). P. eigenmanni is a pale blue-gray to tan. P. caesius also has an attractive blue coloration.

== Ecology ==
Propimelodus lives in swiftly flowing waters of open channels of the Amazon River and many of its large tributaries; P. caesius is one of the most common fish in these habitats.

P. eigenmanni associate with mud or detritus substrates. P. caesius is found in turbid, blackwater habitats over sand, clay, and detritus substrates. P. eigenmanni is nocturnal, found in tidally influenced freshwater habitats on mud substrate and near dense vegetation. P. araguayae has been found near the edge of rivers among macrophytes.
