= Exallodontus aguanai =

Conservation status
- Least Concern (IUCN 3.1)

Scientific classification
- Kingdom: Animalia
- Phylum: Chordata
- Class: Actinopterygii
- Order: Siluriformes
- Family: Pimelodidae
- Genus: Exallodontus; Lundberg, Mago-Leccia & Nass, 1991
- Species: E. aguanai

Binomial name
- Exallodontus aguanai Lundberg, Mago-Leccia & Nass, 1991

Species of fish

Exallodontus aguanai is a catfish species (order Siluriformes) of the monotypic genus Exallodontus of the family Pimelodidae. This genus and species was described in 1991. This species reaches 20 centimetres (7.9 in) SL. This species is native to the Amazon and Orinoco River basins of Brazil, Colombia, Peru and Venezuela. Exallodontus is classified under the "Calophysus-Pimelodus clade". Within this clade, it is considered a part of the "Pimelodus-group" of Pimelodids, which also includes Pimelodus, Duopalatinus, Cheirocerus, Iheringichthys, Bergiaria, Bagropsis, Parapimelodus, Platysilurus, Platystomatichthys, and Propimelodus.
