= Zungaropsis =

Scientific classification
- Kingdom: Animalia
- Phylum: Chordata
- Class: Actinopterygii
- Order: Siluriformes
- Family: Pimelodidae
- Genus: Zungaropsis; Steindachner, 1908
- Species: Z. multimaculatus

Binomial name
- Zungaropsis multimaculatus Steindachner, 1908

Genus of fishes

Zungaropsis is a genus of catfish in the family Pimelodidae- also called the long-whiskered catfishes. Zungaropsis is a monotypic genus, containing only the single species Zungaropsis multimaculatus, and is considered to be closely related to the genus Zungaro, which contains the Gilded catfish. In 2003, Zungaropsis was considered as a genus inquirendum of the Pimelodidae.

Z. multimaculatus is endemic to Brazil, where it occurs in the Xingu River.
