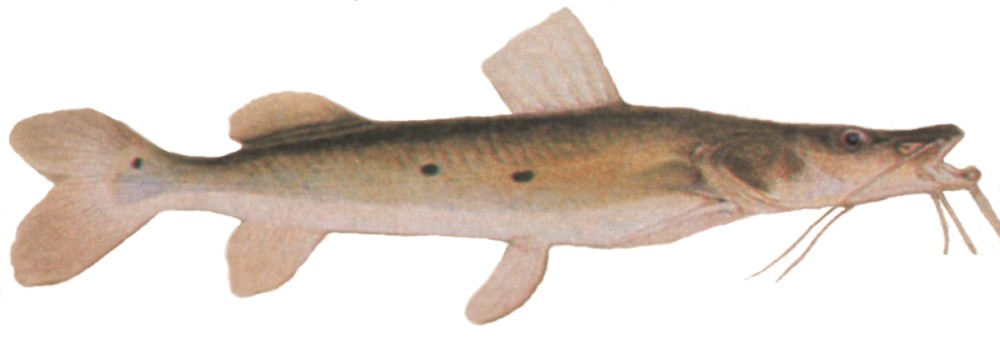

Conservation status
- Least Concern (IUCN 3.1)

Scientific classification
- Kingdom: Animalia
- Phylum: Chordata
- Class: Actinopterygii
- Order: Siluriformes
- Family: Pimelodidae
- Genus: Hemisorubim; Bleeker, 1862
- Species: H. platyrhynchos

Binomial name
- Hemisorubim platyrhynchos (Valenciennes, 1840)

Synonyms
- Platystoma platyrhynchos Valenciennes, 1840

= Porthole shovelnose catfish =

Species of fish

The porthole shovelnose catfish or spotted shovelnose catfish (Hemisorubim platyrhynchos) is the only species in the genus Hemisorubim of the catfish (order Siluriformes) family Pimelodidae.

== Taxonomy ==
This fish is considered one of the "sorubimine" catfishes, an informal group of catfish that includes genera such as Sorubim, Pseudoplatystoma, and Brachyplatystoma. This genus forms a monophyletic group with Sorubim, Sorubimichthys, Pseudoplatystoma, and Zungaro. Of these genera, Hemisorubim is most closely related to Pseudoplatystoma.

== Distribution ==
This species is native to South America and originates from the Amazon, Maroni, Orinoco, and Paraná River basins. It also occurs in the Pantanal.

== Appearance and anatomy ==
This fish reaches a length of 52.5 centimetres (20.7 in) SL and weighs up to 1,470 grams (3.24 lb). It is the sixth largest Pimelodid in the Pantanal. Its body shape and color pattern are perfectly adapted to the muddy bottom where they inhabit. These fish have a relatively slow growth rate, except during the first year of life when growth is rapid.

== Ecology ==
This species is rather rare, confined to the deeper and slow-moving parts of large rivers together with some Loricaria and Potamotrygon. The position of the eyes and the shape of the mouth of this piscivorous fish indicate its stalking mode of hunting; these fish feed on benthic organisms and other fish. During the receding period, these fish migrate and leave the flooded areas and return to the river channel.

== Relationship to humans ==
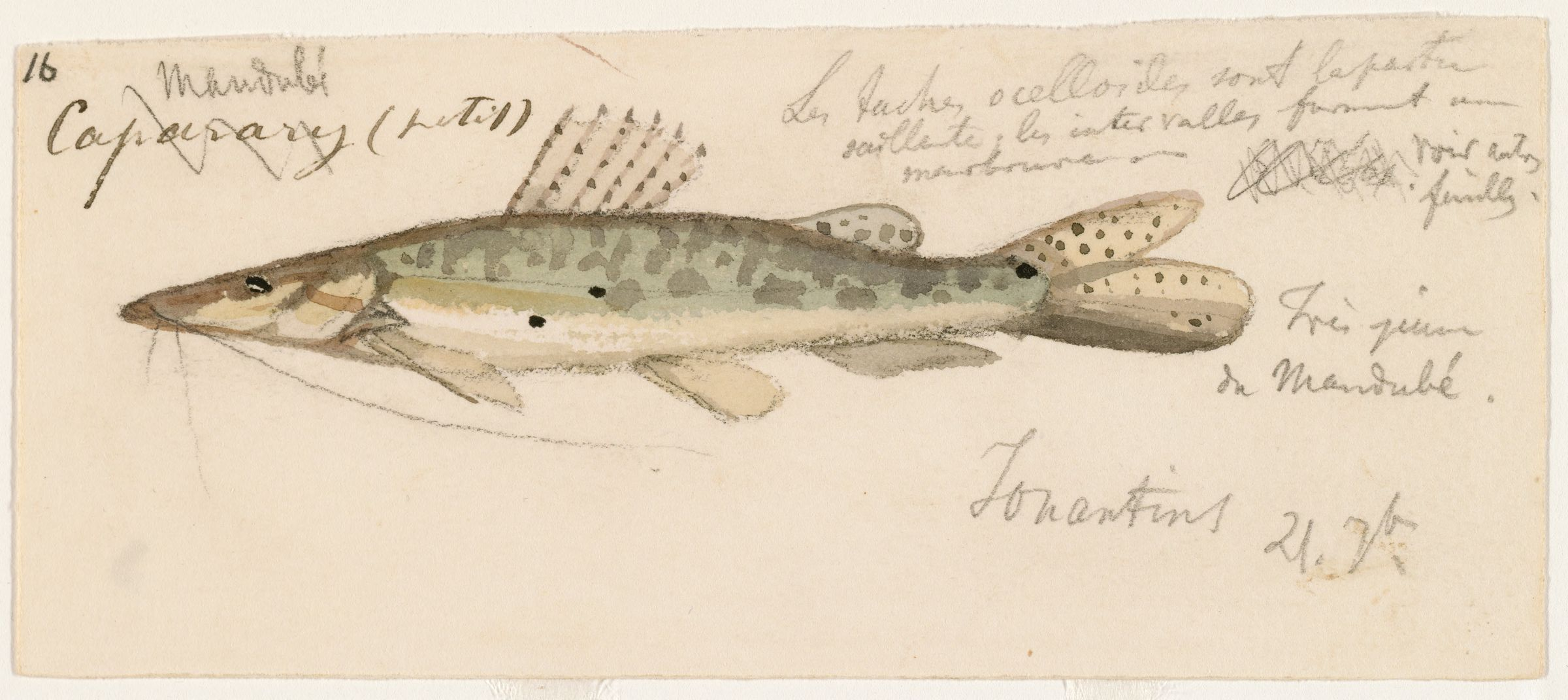
An 1865 watercolor painting of a Brazilian spotted shovelnose catfish by Jacques Burkhardt.

The meat of this species is highly valued. This animal is found in the fish market of Cuiabá River in March, April, September, and October. In the southern Pantanal, landing data, including professional and recreational fishing results for 1999, recorded 7.8 metric tons. The accumulated amount of fish landed from 1994 to 1999 was 50 metric tons.
