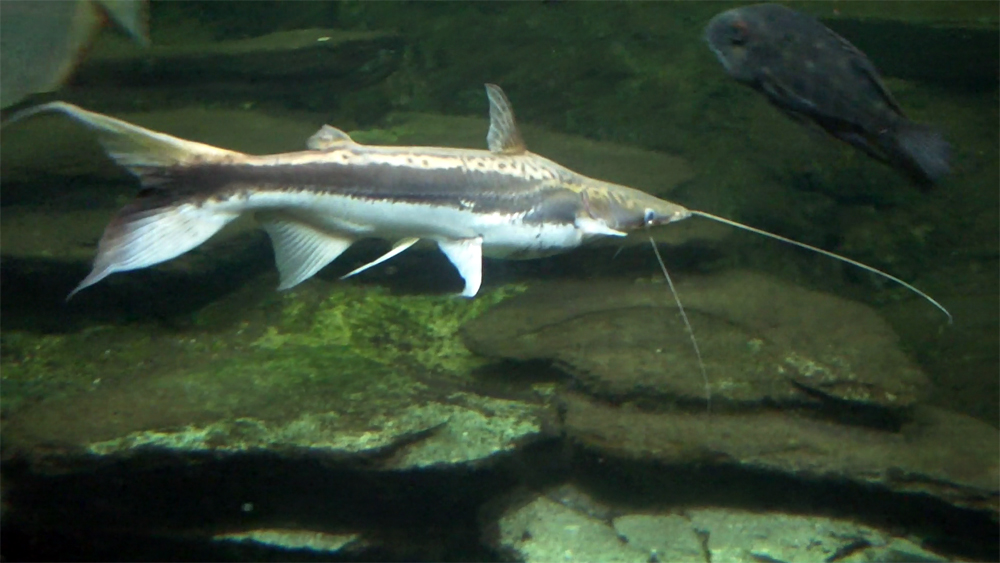

Conservation status
- Least Concern (IUCN 3.1)

Scientific classification
- Kingdom: Animalia
- Phylum: Chordata
- Class: Actinopterygii
- Division: Teleostei
- Order: Siluriformes
- Family: Pimelodidae
- Genus: Sorubim
- Species: S. lima

Binomial name
- Sorubim lima (Bloch & Schneider, 1801)

Synonyms
- Silurus lima Bloch & Schneider, 1801; Sorubim infraoculare Spix in Spix & Agassiz, 1829; Platystoma luceri Weyenbergh, 1877; Sorubim latirostris A. de Miranda Ribeiro, 1920

= Sorubim lima =

Species of fish

Sorubim lima is a species of fish of the Pimelodidae family in the order Siluriformes.

== Morphology ==
Males can reach 54.2 cm (21.3 in) in total length and 1.5 kg (3 lb 5 oz) in weight. Their body is devoid of scales and covered with bone plaques. It has an irregular gray line from the head to the caudal fin. The head is long and flat. The mouth is round and the upper jaw is larger than the jaw. The eyes are located laterally. Its back is dark brown on the front, yellowish and then whitish below the side line. Its fins are reddish to pink.

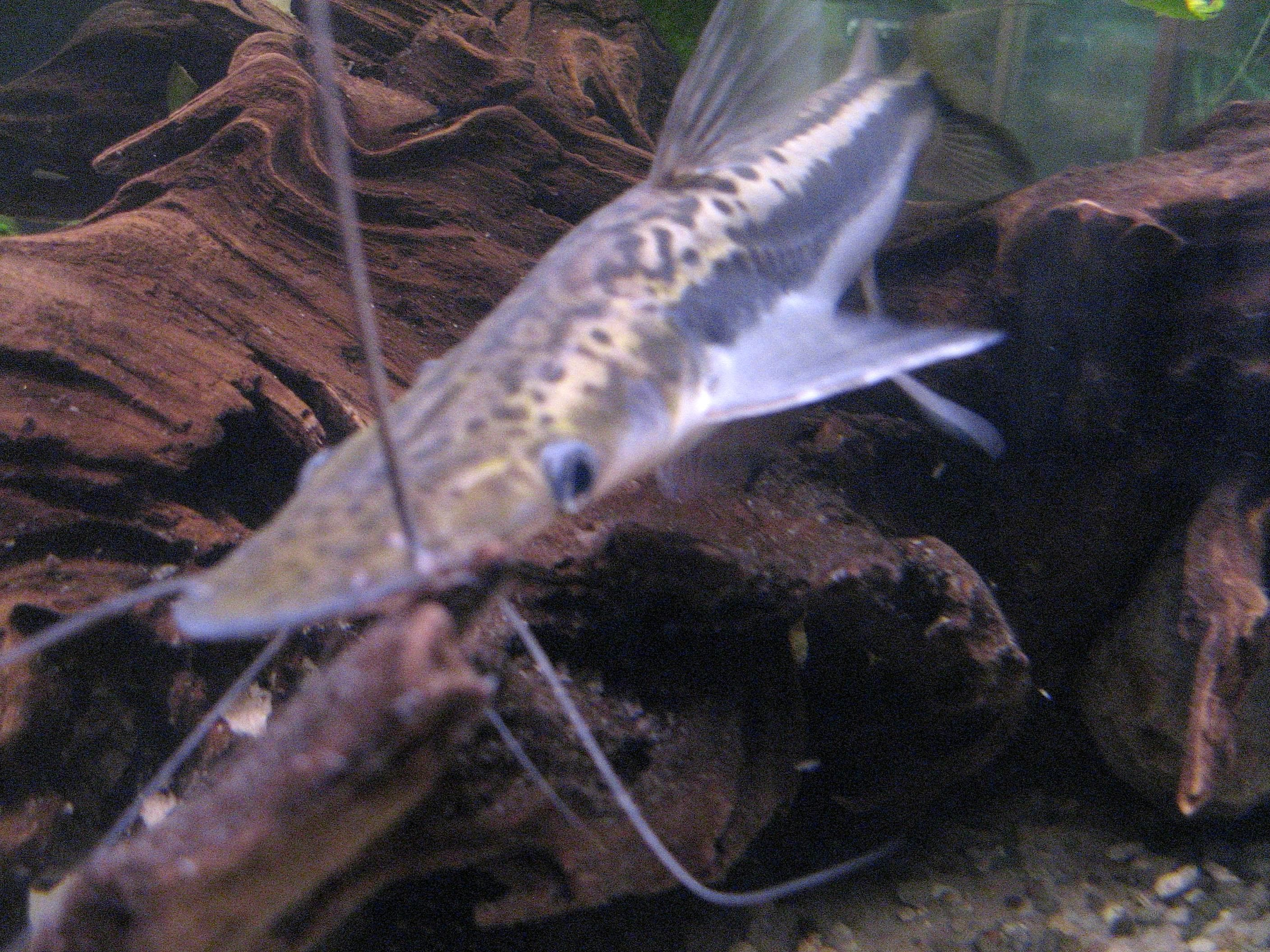

== Diet ==
It eats mainly fish and crustaceans.

== Habitat ==
It is a freshwater fish living in a tropical climate 23–30 °C (73–86 °F).

== Bibliography ==
- Fenner, Robert M.: The Conscientious Marine Aquarist. Neptune City, New Jersey, United States: T.F.H. Publications, 2001.
- Helfman, G., B. Collette and D. Facey: The diversity of fishes. Blackwell Science, Malden, Massachusetts, United States, 1997.
- Moyle, P. and J. Cech.: Fishes: An Introduction to Ichthyology, 4th edition, Upper Saddle River, New Jersey, United States: Prentice-Hall. Year 2000.
- Nelson, Joseph S.; Grande, Terry C.; Wilson, Mark V. H. (2016). Fishes of the World (5th ed.). Hoboken: John Wiley and Sons. doi:10.1002/9781119174844. ISBN 978-1-118-34233-6.
- Wheeler, A.: The World Encyclopedia of Fishes, 2nd edition, London: Macdonald. Year 1985.
