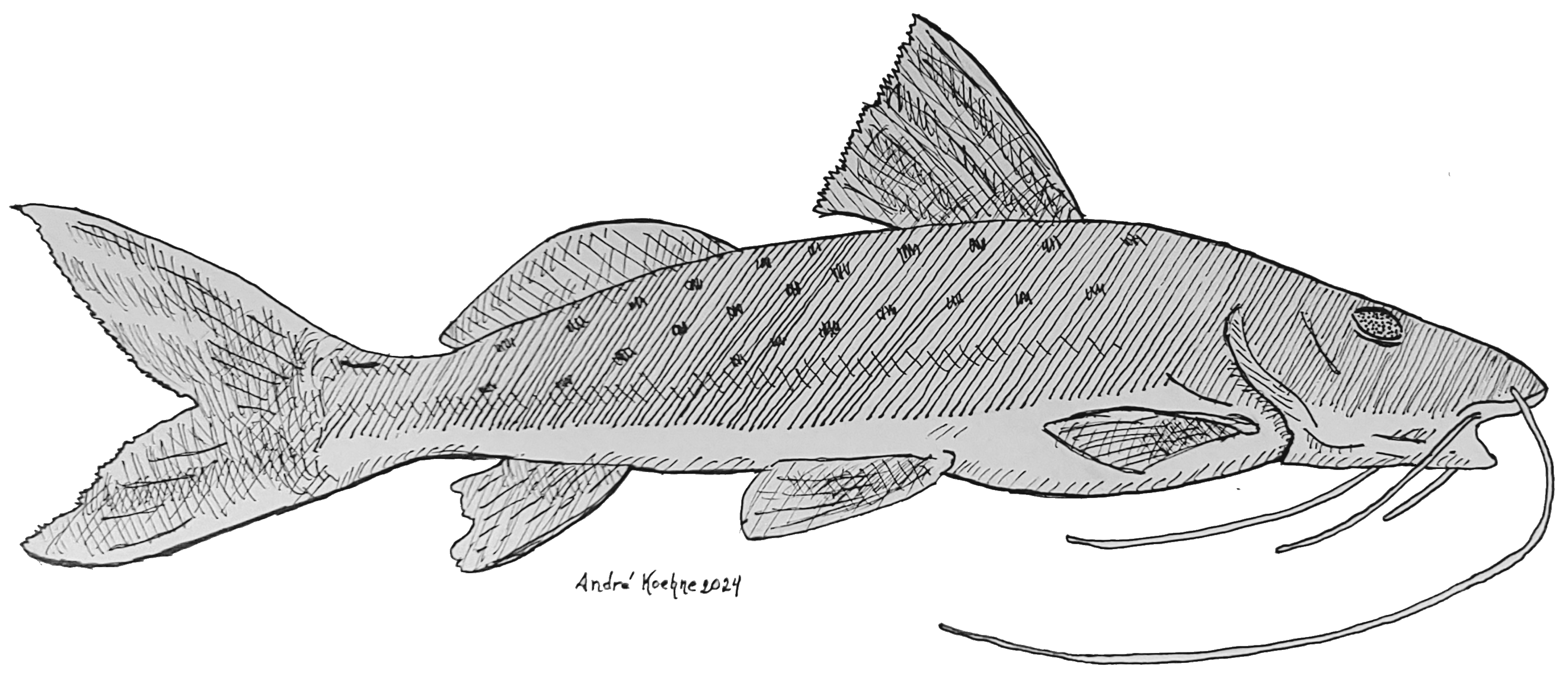
- Duopalatinus emarginatus

Conservation status
- Least Concern (IUCN 3.1)

Scientific classification
- Kingdom: Animalia
- Phylum: Chordata
- Class: Actinopterygii
- Order: Siluriformes
- Family: Pimelodidae
- Genus: Duopalatinus
- Species: D. emarginatus

Binomial name
- Duopalatinus emarginatus (Valenciennes, 1840)

= Duopalatinus emarginatus =

Species of fish

Duopalatinus emarginatus, is a species of demersal catfish of the family Pimelodidae that is native to São Francisco River basin of Brazil.
