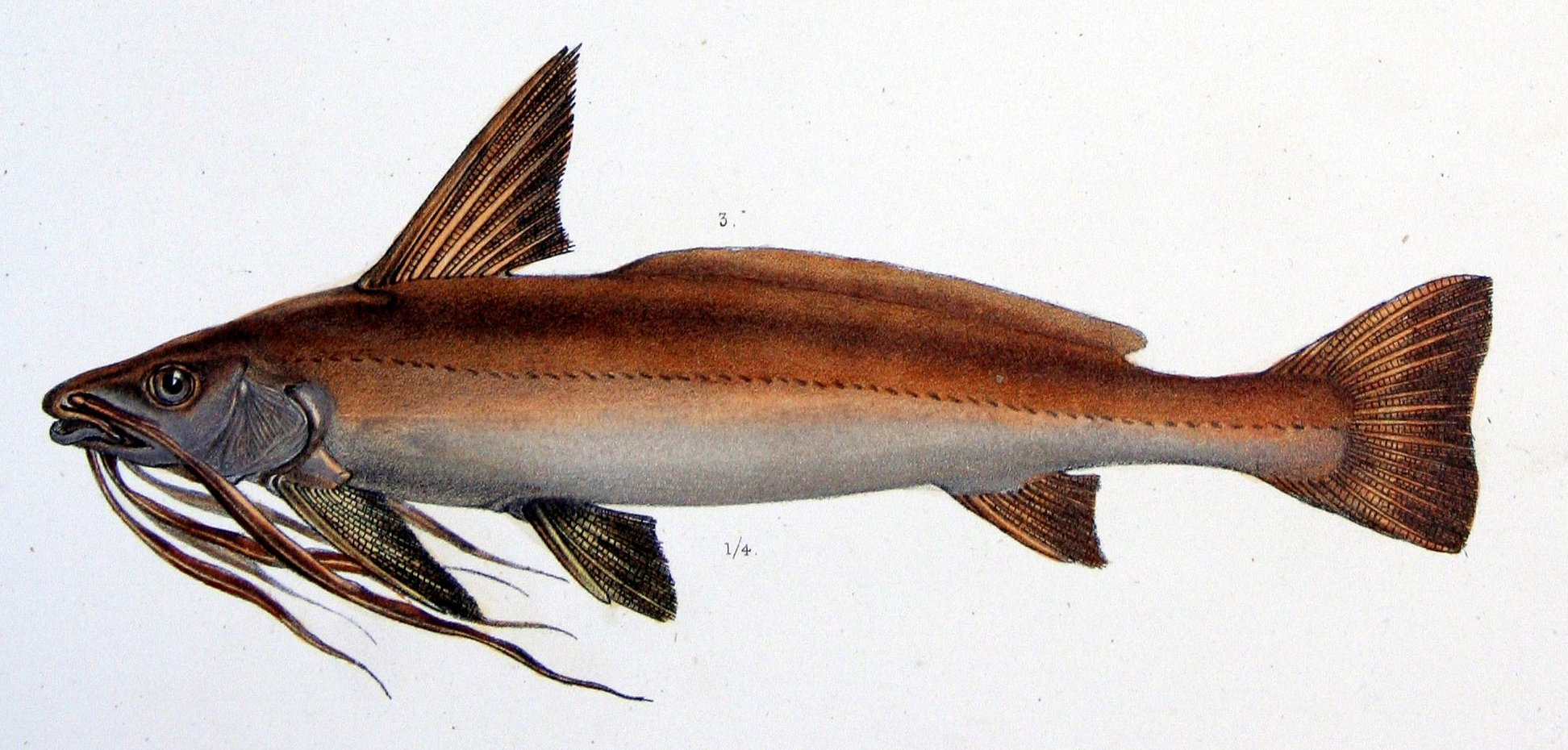

Conservation status
- Least Concern (IUCN 3.1)

Scientific classification
- Kingdom: Animalia
- Phylum: Chordata
- Class: Actinopterygii
- Division: Teleostei
- Order: Siluriformes
- Family: Pimelodidae
- Genus: Pinirampus; Bleeker 1858
- Species: P. pirinampu

Binomial name
- Pinirampus pirinampu (Spix & Agassiz, 1829)

Synonyms
- Pimelodus barbancho Humboldt, in Humboldt & Valenciennes, 1821; Pimelodus pirinampu Spix & Agassiz, 1829; Pimelodus insignis Jardine, in Schomburgk, 1841; Galeichthys araguayensis Castelnau, 1855; Pinirampus typus Bleeker, 1862; Pirinampus agassizii Steindachner, 1876

= Pinirampus =

Pinirampus pirinampu

Species of fish

Pinirampus pirinampu is a species of catfish (order Siluriformes) of the family Pimelodidae. P. pirinampu is also known as the flatwhiskered catfish.

== Taxonomy ==
This species was first described as Pimelodus barbancho; however, this is considered a nomen oblitum. It was then described as Pimelodus pirinampu in 1829. In 1858, the genus Pinirampus was described for this species, in which it is usually classified as the only species. However, Megalonema argentinum has sometimes been considered a part of this genus.

== Distribution ==
This species is found in the Amazon, Essequibo, Orinoco, and Paraná basins.

== Description ==
P. pirinampu may reach a length of 60–75 centimetres (24–30 in) and an average weight of 3–5 kilograms (6.6–11.0 lb). This species has a maximum published weight of 7.68 kg (16.93 lb). These fish reach sexual maturity at just under 60 cm (24 in) in length.

== Ecology ==
P. pirinampu occurs in schools. These catfish feed on benthic animals; they are nonspecialist feeders preying upon fish such as Iheringichthys labrosus and piranha Serrasalmus sp.. In the Amazon basin, these fish are preyed upon by Zungaro zungaro. These fish are known from temperatures ranging from 24 to 29 °C (75 to 84 °F), pH range of 6 to 8, and an alkalinity range of 42 to 142 mEq/L.

P. pirinampu is a species of migratory catfish. These fish gather in schools in the dry season to swim upstream to the headwaters, where they spawn at the onset of the rainy season in February. After spawning, the adults and juveniles drift downstream, reaching flooded areas or reservoirs used as foraging, growth sites and shelter against predation.

== Relationship to humans ==
P. pirinampu is important for the fishery yield in Amazonas, Mato Grosso, Mato Grosso do Sul, Paraná, and Roraima states. This species is included in the fishery statistics on the Paraguay River basin. Brazil's Mato Grosso do Sul state government has adopted the criterion of 60 cm (24 in) TL minimum capture size for P. pirinampu. P. pirinampu is an attractive fish for both leisure and professional sport fishers due to its tasteful meat and its fighting behavior.

This species is one of the top ten dominant species in professional landings in the Itaipu reservoir of the Paraná river, where it is captured with longlines and cast nets in the upper half of the reservoir. This species is also among the most important fishery resources in the Eng Souza Dias (Jupiá) Reservoir in the Upper Paraná river and the Águas Vermelhas reservoir in the Grande River.
