= Duopalatinus peruanus =

Conservation status
- Least Concern (IUCN 3.1)

Scientific classification
- Kingdom: Animalia
- Phylum: Chordata
- Class: Actinopterygii
- Order: Siluriformes
- Family: Pimelodidae
- Genus: Duopalatinus
- Species: D. peruanus

Binomial name
- Duopalatinus peruanus C. H. Eigenmann & Allen, 1942

Species of fish

Duopalatinus peruanus, is a species of demersal catfish of the family Pimelodidae that is native to Amazon and Orinoco river basins in Peru.

It grows to a length of 150 mm (5.9 in).
