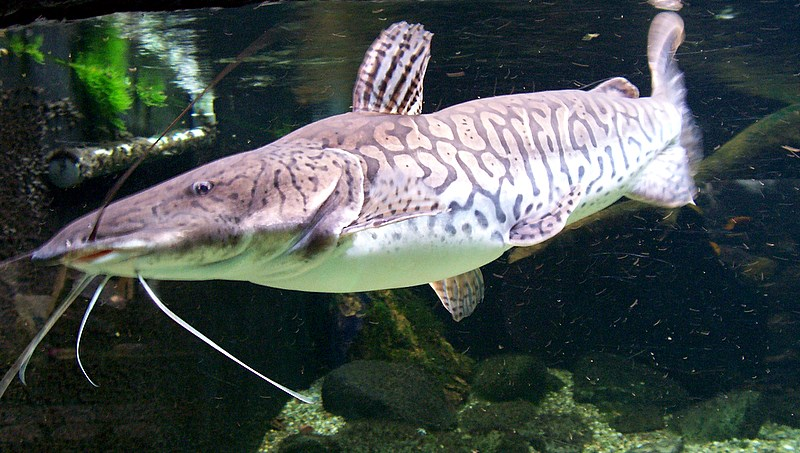

Conservation status
- Least Concern (IUCN 3.1)

Scientific classification
- Kingdom: Animalia
- Phylum: Chordata
- Class: Actinopterygii
- Order: Siluriformes
- Family: Pimelodidae
- Genus: Pseudoplatystoma
- Species: P. tigrinum

Binomial name
- Pseudoplatystoma tigrinum (Valenciennes, 1840)

Synonyms
- Platystoma tigrinum Valenciennes, 1840; Platystoma truncatum Agassiz, 1829; Platystoma punctatum Valenciennes, 1840

= Pseudoplatystoma tigrinum =

Tiger sorubim

Species of fish

Pseudoplatystoma tigrinum, the tiger sorubim, tiger shovelnose or caparari is a species of long-whiskered catfish native to the Amazon Basin in South America.

The largest individuals of this species grows to 130 cm (51 in) in total length. Although most specimens are smaller than this.
