= Proteocephalus =

Scientific classification
- Kingdom: Animalia
- Phylum: Platyhelminthes
- Class: Cestoda
- Order: Onchoproteocephalidea
- Family: Proteocephalidae
- Genus: Proteocephalus; Weinland, 1858

Synonyms
- Ichthyotaenia Lönnberg, 1894; Ichthyotaeonia Zschokke, 1903

Genus of flatworms

Proteocephalus is a genus of flatworms belonging to the family Proteocephalidae.

The genus has cosmopolitan distribution.

Species:

- Proteocephalus aberrans Brooks, 1978
- Proteocephalus ambiguus (Dujardin, 1845) Weinland, 1858
- Proteocephalus ambloplitis (Leidy, 1887)
- Proteocephalus amphiumicola Brooks, 1978
- Proteocephalus australis Chandler, 1935
- Proteocephalus bagri Spector & Garzon, 1988
- Proteocephalus beauchampi Furhmann & Baer, 1925
- Proteocephalus bivitellatus Woodland, 1937
- Proteocephalus brooksi García-Prieto, Rodríguez & Pérez-Ponce de León, 1996
- Proteocephalus buplanensis Mayes, 1976
- Proteocephalus cernuae (Gmelin, 1790) La Rue, 1911
- Proteocephalus chamelensis Pérez-Ponce de León, Brooks & Berman, 1995
- Proteocephalus chologasteri Whittaker & Hill, 1968
- Proteocephalus coregoni Wardle, 1932
- Proteocephalus culaeae Scholz, Choudhury & Nelson, 2020
- Proteocephalus cunningtoni Furhmann & Baer, 1925
- Proteocephalus demshini Scholz, de Chambrier, Shimazu, Ermolenko & Waeschenbach, 2017
- Proteocephalus dinotopteri Furhmann & Baer, 1925
- Proteocephalus elongatus Chandler, 1935
- Proteocephalus exiguus La Rue, 1911
- Proteocephalus filicollis (Rudolphi, 1802) Weinland, 1858
- Proteocephalus fluviatilis Bangham, 1925
- Proteocephalus fossatus (Riggenbach, 1895) La Rue, 1911
- Proteocephalus gaspari de Chambrier & Vaucher, 1984
- Proteocephalus gibsoni Rego & Pavanelli, 1991
- Proteocephalus glanduligerus (Janicki, 1928) Fuhrmann, 1933
- Proteocephalus gobiorum Dogiel & Bychowsky, 1939
- Proteocephalus hemioliopteri de Chambrier & Vaucher, 1997
- Proteocephalus hemispherous Rahemo & Al Niaeemi, 2001
- Proteocephalus hobergi de Chambrier & Vaucher, 1999
- Proteocephalus kashmirensis Dhar & Raina, 1983
- Proteocephalus kuyukuyu Woodland, 1935
- Proteocephalus longicollis (Zeder, 1800) Benedict, 1900
- Proteocephalus luciopercae Wardle, 1932
- Proteocephalus macrocephalus (Creplin, 1825) Nufer, 1905
- Proteocephalus macrophallus (Diesing, 1850) La Rue, 1914
- Proteocephalus mahnerti de Chambrier & Vaucher, 1999
- Proteocephalus manjuariphilus Vigueras, 1936
- Proteocephalus membranacei Troncy, 1978
- Proteocephalus microscopicus Woodland, 1935
- Proteocephalus midoriensis Shimazu, 1990
- Proteocephalus misgurni Scholz, de Chambrier, Shimazu, Ermolenko & Waeschenbach, 2017
- Proteocephalus osburni Bangham, 1925
- Proteocephalus parasiluri Yamaguti, 1934
- Proteocephalus pearsei La Rue, 1919
- Proteocephalus pentastomus (Klaptocz, 1906) La Rue, 1911
- Proteocephalus percae (Müller, 1780) Railliet, 1899
- Proteocephalus perplexus La Rue, 1911
- Proteocephalus pilarensis de Chambrier & Vaucher, 1999
- Proteocephalus pimelodi (Gil de Pertierra, 1995) de Chambrier & Vaucher, 1997
- Proteocephalus pinguis La Rue, 1911
- Proteocephalus platystomi Lynsdale, 1959
- Proteocephalus plecoglossi Yamaguti, 1934
- Proteocephalus poulsoni Whittaker & Zober, 1978
- Proteocephalus pugetensis Hoff & Hoff, 1929
- Proteocephalus regoi de Chambrier, Scholz & Vaucher, 1996
- Proteocephalus renaudi de Chambrier & Vaucher, 1994
- Proteocephalus rhamdiae Spector & Garzon, 1988
- Proteocephalus sagittus (Grimm, 1872) La Rue, 1911
- Proteocephalus serrasalmus Rego & Pavanelli, 1990
- Proteocephalus singularis La Rue, 1911
- Proteocephalus sinocyclocheili Nie, 1997
- Proteocephalus sireni Brooks & Buckner, 1976
- Proteocephalus soniae de Chambrier & Vaucher, 1994
- Proteocephalus sophiae de Chambrier & Rego, 1994
- Proteocephalus stizostethi Hunter & Bangham, 1933
- Proteocephalus sulcatus (Klaptocz, 1906) La Rue, 1911
- Proteocephalus synodontis Woodland, 1925
- Proteocephalus tetrastomus (Rudolphi, 1810) Willemse, 1969
- Proteocephalus thymalli (Annenkova-Chlopina, 1923) Gvosdev, 1950
- Proteocephalus torulosus (Batsch, 1786) Nufer, 1905
- Proteocephalus vazzolerae Pavanelli & Takemoto, 1995
- Proteocephalus vitellaris Verma, 1928
- Proteocephalus vladimirae de Chambrier & Vaucher, 1999
