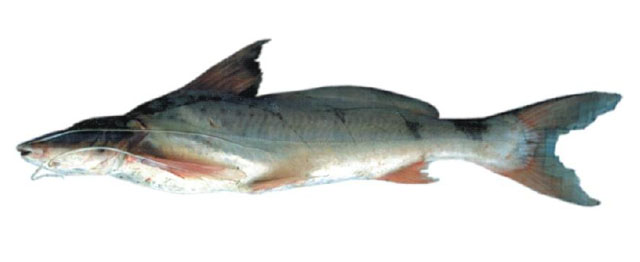

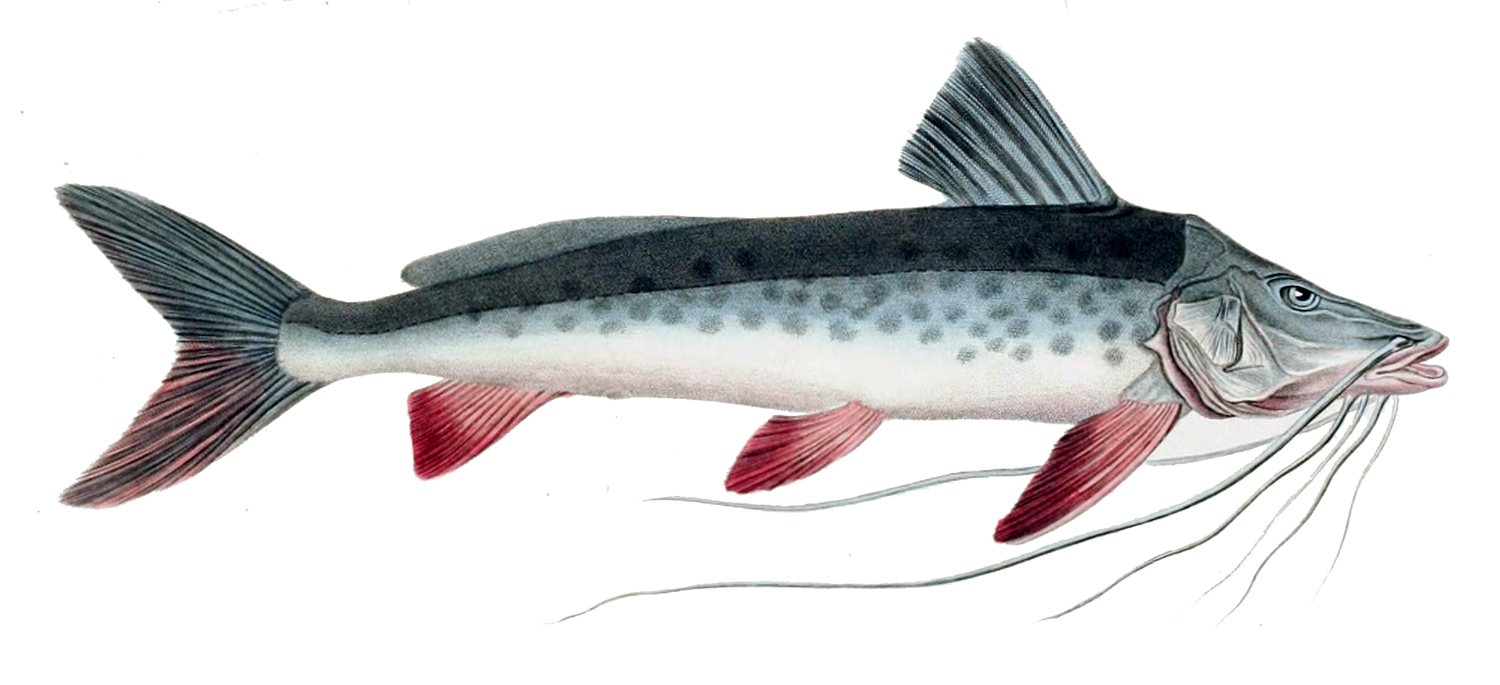

Conservation status
- Least Concern (IUCN 3.1)

Scientific classification
- Kingdom: Animalia
- Phylum: Chordata
- Class: Actinopterygii
- Order: Siluriformes
- Family: Pimelodidae
- Genus: Luciopimelodus; C. H. Eigenmann & Eigenmann, 1888
- Species: L. pati

Binomial name
- Luciopimelodus pati (Valenciennes, 1835)

Synonyms
- Bagrus tucumanus Burmeister, 1861; Pimelodus pati Valenciennes, 1835; Silurus pati Larrañaga, 1923; Silurus undecimradiatus Larrañaga, 1923

= Luciopimelodus =

Genus of fishes

Luciopimelodus pati is a South American species of freshwater long-whiskered catfish that inhabits the basin of the Río de la Plata and the Blanco River of Argentina, Brazil and Paraguay. Its scientific name originates from its common name patí, though it may be simply referred to as pez gato ("catfish") in Spanish. This species is the only recognized species in its genus.

It is found mostly in turbid and deep waters with moderate current. This fish can reach up to 103 centimetres (41 in) TL. This fish is sparingly seen as an aquarium fish.
