= Pimelabditus =

Conservation status
- Vulnerable (IUCN 3.1)

Scientific classification
- Kingdom: Animalia
- Phylum: Chordata
- Class: Actinopterygii
- Division: Teleostei
- Order: Siluriformes
- Family: Pimelodidae
- Genus: Pimelabditus; Parisi & Lundberg, 2009
- Species: P. moli

Binomial name
- Pimelabditus moli Parisi & Lundberg, 2009

Species of fish

Pimelabditus moli is a species of long-whiskered catfish native to French Guiana and Suriname where it is found in the Maroni River basin. This species grows to a length of 14.1 centimetres (5.6 in) SL.
