= Pimelodina flavipinnis =

Conservation status
- Least Concern (IUCN 3.1)

Scientific classification
- Kingdom: Animalia
- Phylum: Chordata
- Class: Actinopterygii
- Order: Siluriformes
- Family: Pimelodidae
- Genus: Pimelodina; Steindachner, 1876
- Species: P. flavipinnis

Binomial name
- Pimelodina flavipinnis Steindachner, 1876

Synonyms
- Pimelodina nasus C. H. Eigenmann & Eigenmann, 1888

Species of fish

Pimelodina flavipinnis is the only species of the genus Pimelodina of the family Pimelodidae of catfish (order Siluriformes).

== Distribution ==
P. flavipinnis occurs in the Amazon River from the Capim River to the Ucayali River and at least the lower reaches of Amazonian tributaries such as the Rio Negro and Madeira River. It also can be found from the Orinoco River basin. It may also be widely distributed in the Llanos of Venezuela.

== Description ==
P. flavipinnis grows to a length of about 34 centimetres (13 in) SL. There are three pairs of barbels, one pair maxillary and two pairs under the chin. This species has a highly variable coloration.

== Ecology ==
P. flavipinnis is found in lagoons. These fish migrate upriver during June and July. This species likely feeds through suction on the benthos. Seeds and coarse sand grains were found in the stomach of one specimen, while another had a stomach full of aquatic insects.

== Relationship to humans ==
P. flavipinnis is a food fish. In central Brazil they are caught by commercial fishermen through the use of lampara seines. They are also exploited as they migrate upstream during June and July.
