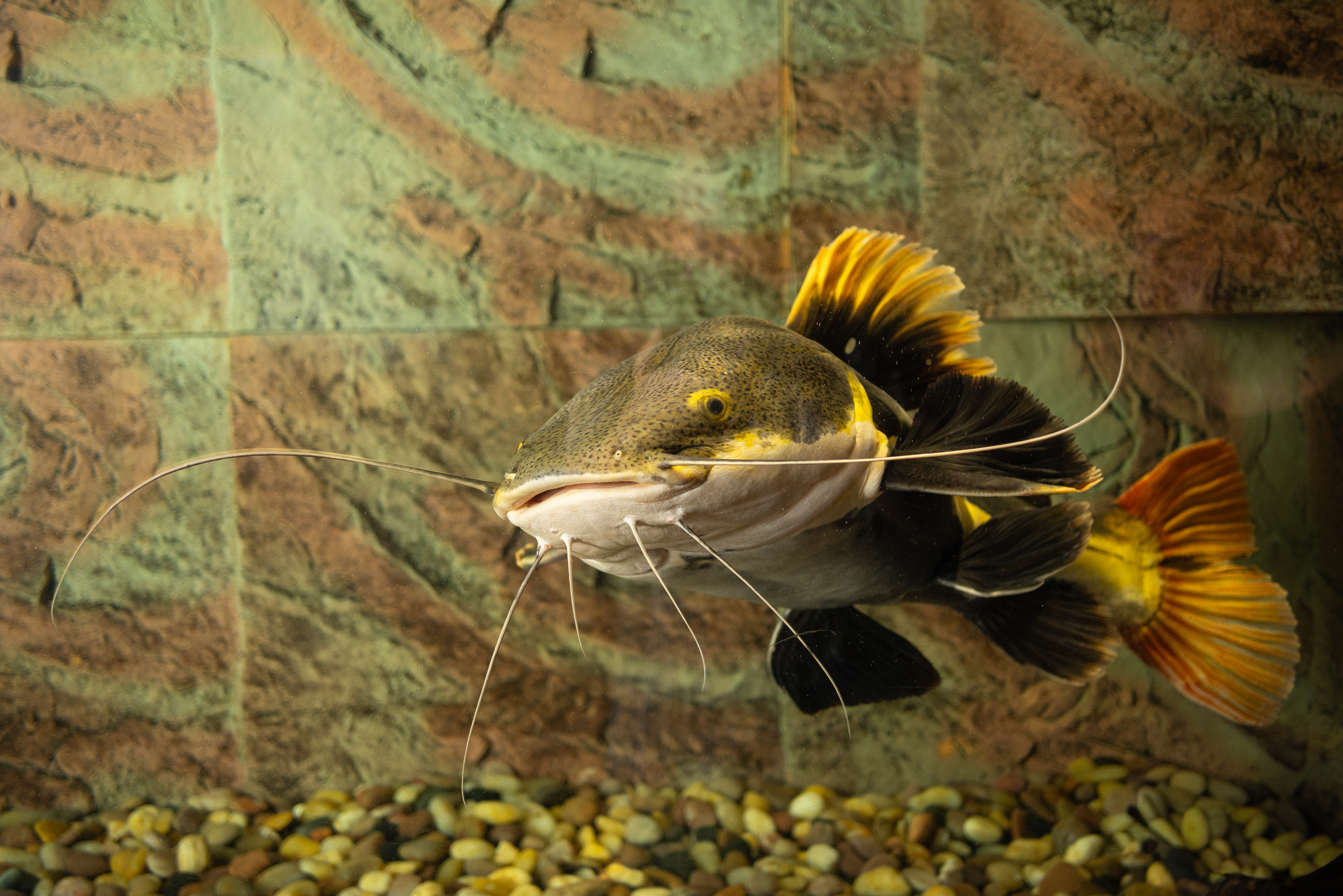

Conservation status
- Least Concern (IUCN 3.1)

Scientific classification
- Kingdom: Animalia
- Phylum: Chordata
- Class: Actinopterygii
- Division: Teleostei
- Order: Siluriformes
- Family: Pimelodidae
- Genus: Phractocephalus; Agassiz, 1829
- Species: P. hemioliopterus

Binomial name
- Phractocephalus hemioliopterus (Bloch & Schneider, 1801)

Synonyms
- Silurus hemioliopterus Bloch & Schneider, 1801; Pimelodus grunniens Humboldt, 1821; Rhamdia grunniens Humboldt, 1821; Phractocephalus bicolor Spix & Agassiz, 1829

= Redtail catfish =

Redtail catfish Temporal range: Miocene - Recent

Species of fish

The redtail catfish (Phractocephalus hemioliopterus) is a large species of South American pimelodid (long-whiskered) catfish. It is known in Venezuelan Spanish as cajaro; in Guyana, it is known as a banana catfish, and in Brazil it is known as pirarara, a fusion of words from the indigenous Tupi language: pirá and arara. It is the only extant species of its genus, Phractocephalus.

The redtail catfish is quite common in the aquarium trade, although it is often sold in its juvenile state, only measuring a few centimeters or inches at the time of sale. Additionally, they are often sold with little to no information for novice or uninformed buyers, with vague warnings, if any, regarding the fish's massive adult size. Thus, many redtail catfish are sold and subsequently purchased as very small specimens, soon outgrowing their new aquariums—something which makes them highly unsuitable for all but the largest, usually public, aquariums (or outdoor stock tanks, pools, ponds, lakes, etc). Unfortunately, many have likely been purchased when young, by uninformed shoppers, and later released by these same individuals when their true size and voracity became evident. In this way, humans have directly contributed to the species' spreading in areas outside of its natural range.

Hatchling (fry) and juvenile redtail catfish are most at-risk of being consumed by a range of predators, both aquatic and terrestrial. Larger adult specimens generally have little to fear, becoming voracious, opportunistic hunters themselves. Nevertheless, at any age or size, the redtail catfish is always at-risk of being consumed by humans, jaguars, giant otters, Orinoco and American crocodiles, and caimans, among other species.

Unlike other, bottom-dwelling catfish species, the redtail is an active swimmer, and does not lie in-wait on the river bottom to ambush passing prey. The redtail catfish is also not a picky eater, and is known for consuming anything that fits into its mouth. Meals range from other types of fishes, crustaceans, aquatic worms, and even amphibians, such as frogs, to fallen fruits, seeds and tree nuts, such as those of palms or Ficus. In captivity, it has been reported that the redtail catfish will eat dry cat food.

== Fossil species ==
Although the redtail catfish is the only living representative of this genus, there are other members that date back to the upper Miocene, and are only known from fossil remains. P. nassi was described in 2003, from the Urumaco Formation at Urumaco, Venezuela. Another fossil species, P. acreornatus, is known from the Solimões Formation, Acre, Brazil. This genus has a minimum age of about 13.5 million years.

(video) Juvenile redtail catfish swimming in an aquarium

== Description ==
Phractocephalus hemioliopterus can reach about 1.8 m (5 ft 11 in) in length, and about 80 kg (180 lb) in weight. However, this is exceptionally rare, and most do not approach this size. They average 42–54 inches (3 ft 6 in – 4 ft 6 in; 1.1–1.4 m) in length. These colorful large catfishes have a brownish back, with yellow sides, and characteristic orange-red dorsal fin and caudal fin (hence the common name). Sometimes the dorsal, pelvic and anal fins are also red. They have a broad head with long whiskers, dark black body and white underneath that extends from the mouth to the caudal fin. It has a pair of barbels on the upper jaw, and two pairs on the lower jaw. Their whiskers are sensitive and have chemical reception cells which are used as the sense of smell. They breed using external fertilization after laying their eggs. They communicate by making a clicking sound to warn off potential dangers.

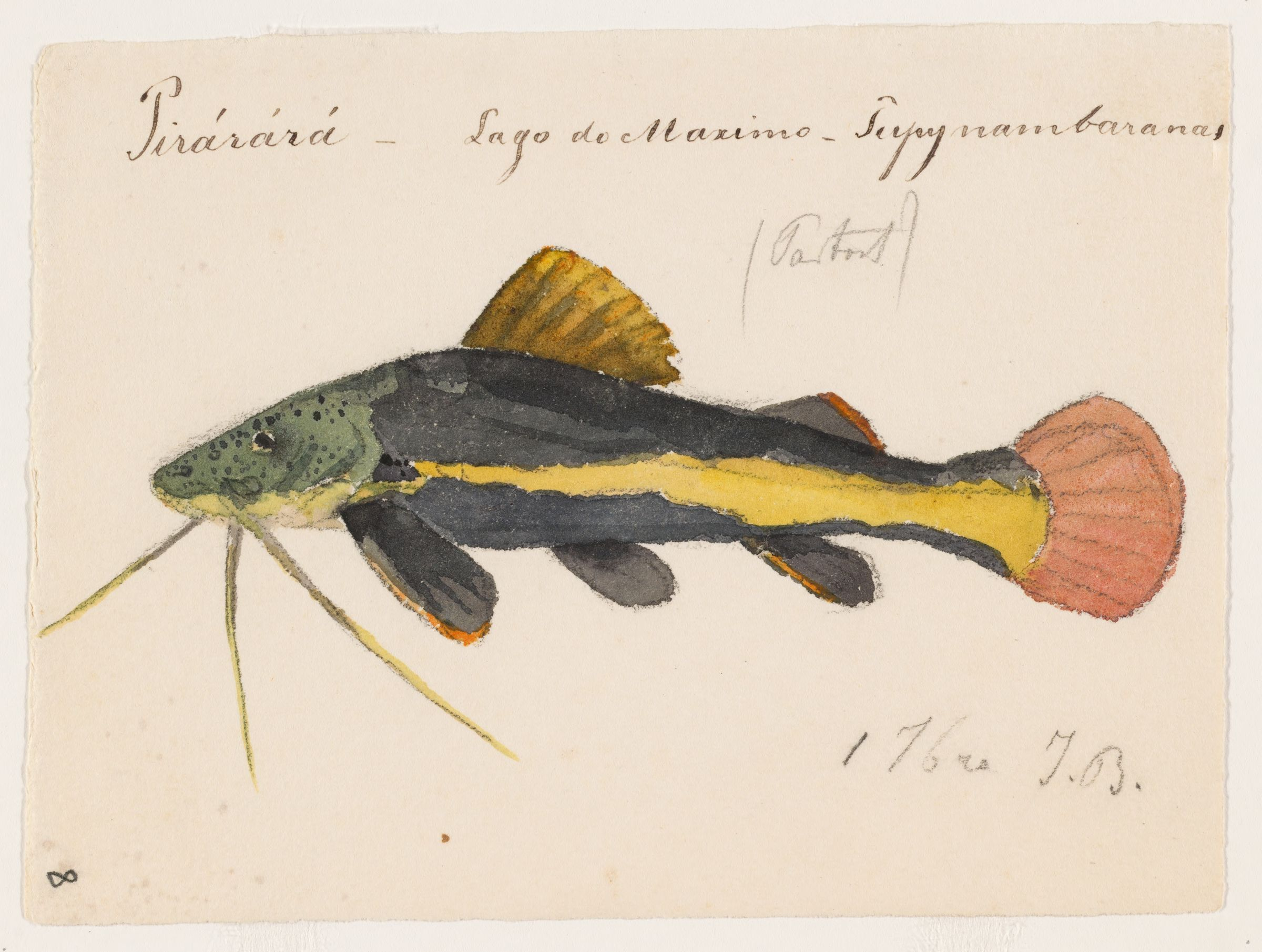
An 1865 watercolor painting of a Brazilian redtail catfish by Jacques Burkhardt

== Distribution and habitat ==
The redtail catfish is native to the Amazon, Orinoco, and Essequibo river basins of South America, in Ecuador, Venezuela, Guyana, Colombia, Peru, Suriname, Bolivia, and Brazil. It is found only in fresh water, and inhabits larger rivers, streams, and lakes. They eat during the evening and night and stay motionless during the day. They are bottom-dwellers and move about quite slowly. Red-tailed catfish are territorial fish. Redtail catfish is also an invasive species in Malaysia; they are now found mostly in the Perak River and Pahang River.

== Relationship with humans ==
Due to the potentially large size of this species, redtail catfish are considered a game fish by anglers. The current IGFA world-record for weight is from 2010 and belongs to Gilberto Fernandes, of Brazil, with a specimen that weighed-in at 56 kg (123 lb 7 oz).

It is said that the South American tribes living in the forests do not eat the meat of redtail catfish as it is "black" in coloration.

Globally, in places such as Thailand, Taiwan, Hong Kong, and Florida, the redtail catfish is an alien species that has likely been released into local waterways by humans, similarly to other large freshwater species (like the common pleco, zebra tilapia, or the alligator gar). In some regions, it is feared as a potential danger to human life; it is believed, by some, to be the cause of the many mysterious drownings of passengers aboard the ship Sobral Santos II when it sank.

=== In the aquarium ===
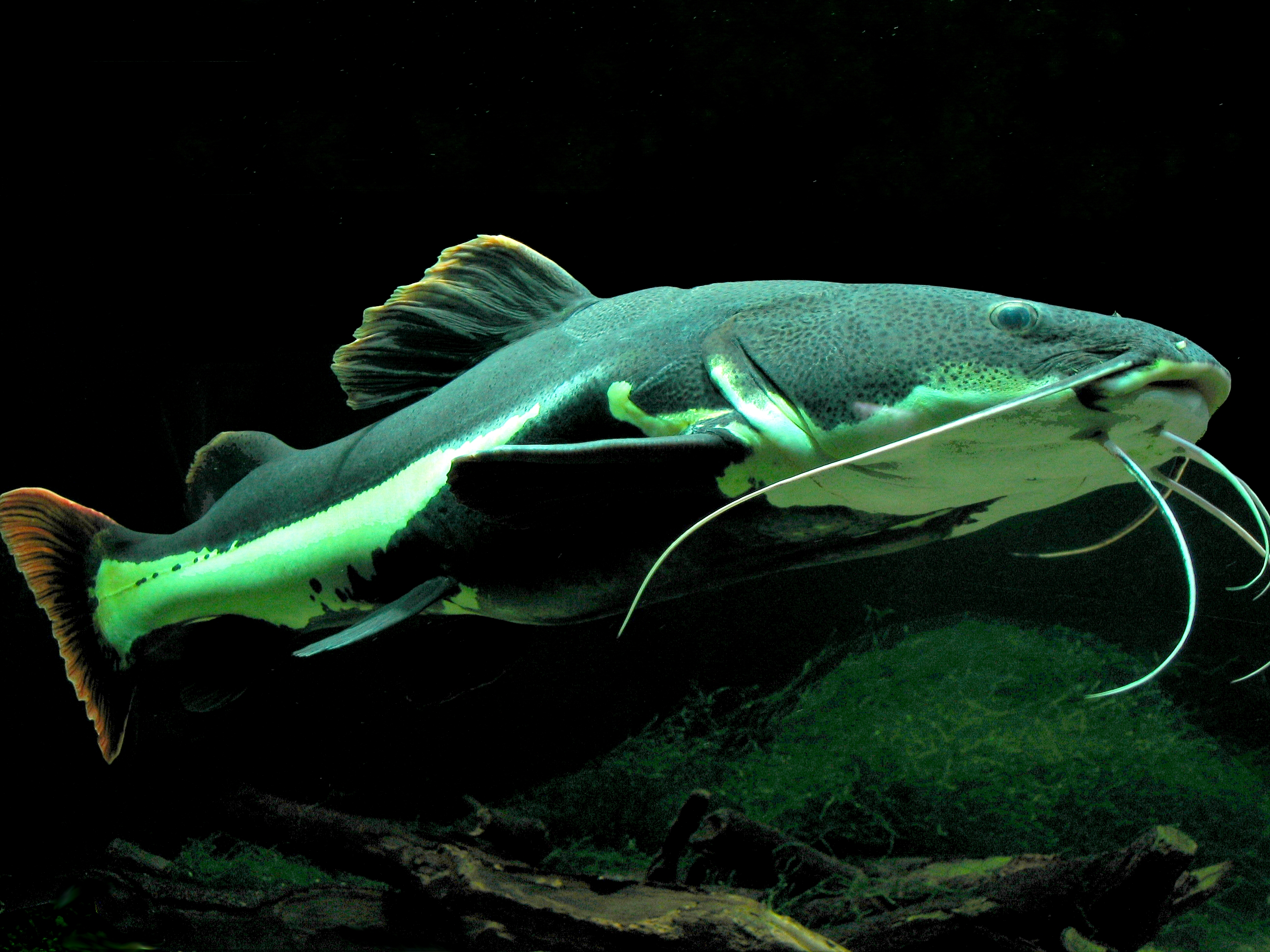
Phractocephalus hemioliopterus in an aquarium

The redtail catfish is an extremely popular fish in Amazonian-themed exhibits at public aquaria, where they are often housed with other large fish, such as Colossoma macropomum or pacu, and other large catfish.

Juveniles are often available as aquarium fish, despite their eventual large size. In an aquarium where they may be well-fed, these fish can grow quite rapidly, and require tanks of at least 10,000 L (2,600 US gal) when fully mature. Weekly feeding is appropriate for this catfish; overfeeding is a common cause of death in this species. It feeds heavily on live and dead fishes and other meat. Even as a juvenile of only a few inches in length, they are able to swallow many of the more common aquarium fish (such as tetras or guppies), and it is only appropriate to house this fish with other species of relatively large size. Redtail catfish also have a habit of swallowing inedible objects in the aquarium. Though these are often regurgitated, both the swallowing and the regurgitation can present a problem for the fish, and these objects are best kept out of the aquarium.

The redtail catfish has been hybridized with other fish, such as the Pseudoplatystoma or tiger shovelnose catfish, through the use of hormones, in attempts to create a viable food fish: the tiger redtail catfish. These hybrid fish sometimes make it into the aquarium hobby under a variety of common names.

== See also ==
- List of freshwater aquarium fish species
