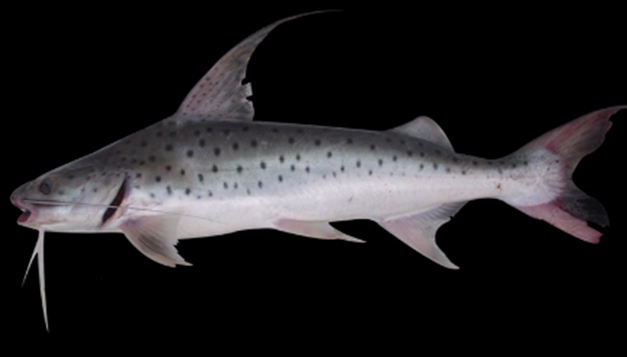
- Tocantins basin

Conservation status
- Least Concern (IUCN 3.1)

Scientific classification
- Kingdom: Animalia
- Phylum: Chordata
- Class: Actinopterygii
- Order: Siluriformes
- Family: Pimelodidae
- Genus: Platynematichthys; Bleeker, 1858
- Species: P. notatus

Binomial name
- Platynematichthys notatus (Jardine, 1841)

Synonyms
- Pimelodus notatus Jardine, 1841; Bagrus nigropunctatus Kner, 1858; Platypogon caerulorostris Starks, 1913

= Platynematichthys =

South American catfish

Platynematichthys notatus, the coroatá or striped catfish, is a species of catfish (order Siluriformes) of the monotypic genus Platynematichthys of the family Pimelodidae. It is native to the Amazon and Orinoco Basins in South America. In the Orinoco this distinctly spotted species reaches up to 1 m (3.3 ft) in standard length, but it reportedly only reaches about half that size in the Amazon.

Platynematichthys and its sister group Brachyplatystoma are the only genera in the tribe Brachyplatystomatini. These two genera are characterized by two synapomorphies; these include a gas bladder divided into an anterior portion and a triangular posterior portion, as well as a ventral crest under the cleithrum, the main bone supporting the pectoral fins.
