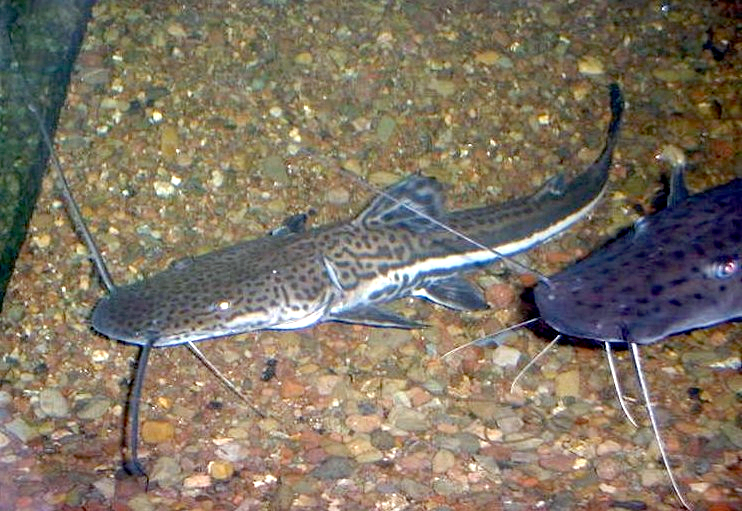

Conservation status
- Least Concern (IUCN 3.1)

Scientific classification
- Kingdom: Animalia
- Phylum: Chordata
- Class: Actinopterygii
- Division: Teleostei
- Order: Siluriformes
- Family: Pimelodidae
- Genus: Sorubimichthys; Bleeker, 1862
- Species: S. planiceps

Binomial name
- Sorubimichthys planiceps (Spix & Agassiz, 1829)
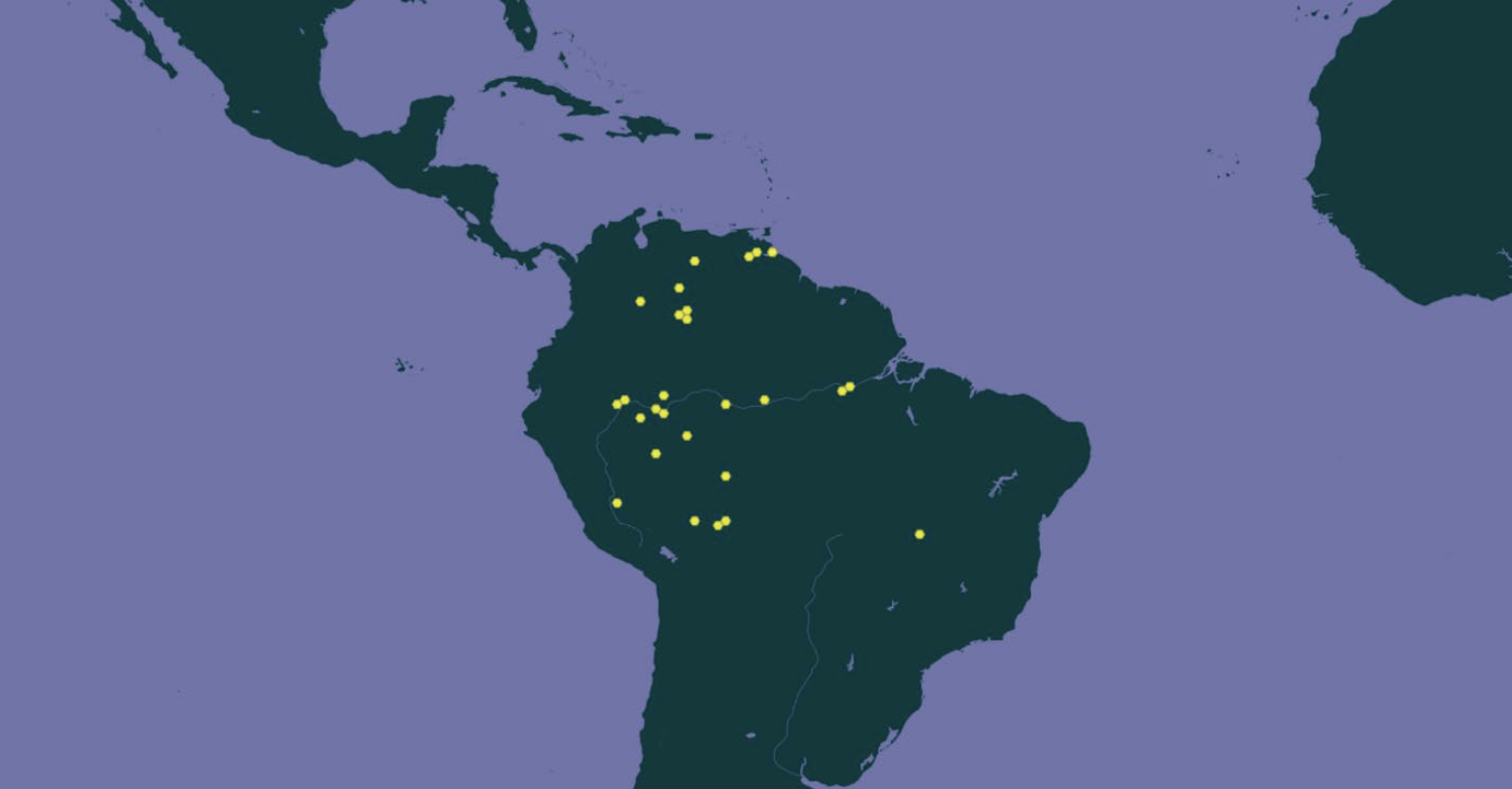
- Firewood catfish range

Synonyms
- Platystoma planiceps Spix & Agassiz, 1829; Platystoma spatula Spix & Agassiz, 1829; Pteroglanis manni Eigenmann & Pearson, 1924; Sorubim jandia Spix, 1829; Sorubimichthys ortoni Gill, 1870; Sorubimichthys spatula (Spix & Agassiz, 1829)

= Firewood catfish =

Species of fish

The firewood catfish (Sorubimichthys planiceps) is a species of South American pimelodid catfish, the sole member of the genus Sorubimichthys. Firewood catfish are one of the hundreds of freshwater fish in the Amazon Basin that play important ecological and economic roles. Known by locals along the Amazon Basin as peixe-lenha, the firewood catfish is so called because it is of little eating value and is often dried and used for firewood. Firewood catfish are imported to areas outside their native range as in-demand aquarium fish.

== Description ==
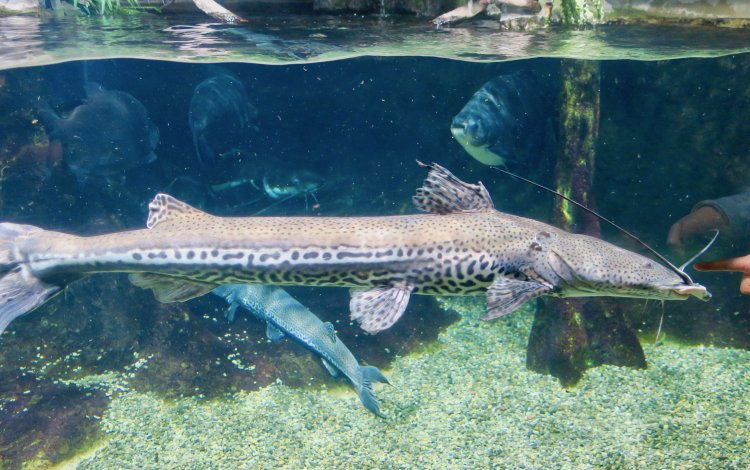
Lateral view of the firewood catfish

The largest recorded specimen of adult firewood catfish was reported at 150 centimetres (59 in) in standard length (a measurement from the tip of the snout to the posterior end of the last vertebrae). Juveniles have been measured ranging from 10–39 millimetres (0.39–1.54 in), and other adult specimens have been measured ranging from 209–475 millimetres (8.2–18.7 in).

Juveniles Standard adult and subadult appearance includes a flat head (the species name, planiceps, comes from the Latin for flathead or flat-headed) with a long upper jaw and a snout adorned by long barbels attached to the jawbone that provide them with sensory information that aids prey-seeking and navigation in deep, murky water. The dorsum is ash-gray with darker spots. The sides have a white band, bordered below by a dark gray or brown band. The venter is usually white with some large spots. The dorsal fin and adipose fin are spotted, and the anal fins are hyaline. They have long, large, deeply forked caudal fins. Like most catfish, they have sharp dorsal and pectoral fins useful for predator defense and abrasive pads on the surface of their mouths.

== Distribution and habitat ==
The firewood catfish occurs in the Amazon Basin, a tropical area which exhibits the greatest diversity of fish species in the world, and in the Orinoco Basin, another tropical habitat rich in rivers, floodplains, and wetlands. It is normally found in whitewater high in suspended sediments. Firewood catfish have been introduced to areas outside of their native range, including Lake Superior through live trade in 2005 and the San Francisco Bay via aquarium release in 2019. Both of these introductions were unsuccessful. The full extent of their occurrence outside of their native distribution as well as the impact on other species of introductions outside of their native ranges are unknown or undocumented, due to a lack of research analyzing their potential effects on non-native ecosystems.

== Ecology ==
Firewood catfish are demersal fish that live in freshwater environments with tropical climates and dense vegetation. Habitats they have been recorded in, such as the Mamoré River, are characterized by meandering, silty rivers and expansive floodplains, capable of providing nurseries for species the firewood catfish predates upon. Like most other members of Pimelodidae, the firewood catfish is a benthic fish. This fish is mainly nocturnal. Firewood catfish are highly predatory and feed on nekton, primarily other fish. As a result of their position at the top of aquatic food chains, many predatory catfish have frequently shown the highest mercury concentrations of measured fish in the Amazon Basin. While not much research has been done on unique roles of the firewood catfish within their ecosystems, one study found that firewood catfish may host a tapeworm parasite described as "new to science".

== Conservation ==
They have been listed as "vulnerable to extinction" in the Orinoco River basin due to habitat loss as a result of urbanization and development. Like many other fish species in South America, firewood catfish live in an area of significant concern due to the impacts of habitat loss, introduced exotic species, and overfishing, and have not been significantly researched with the intention of documenting their ecological roles.
