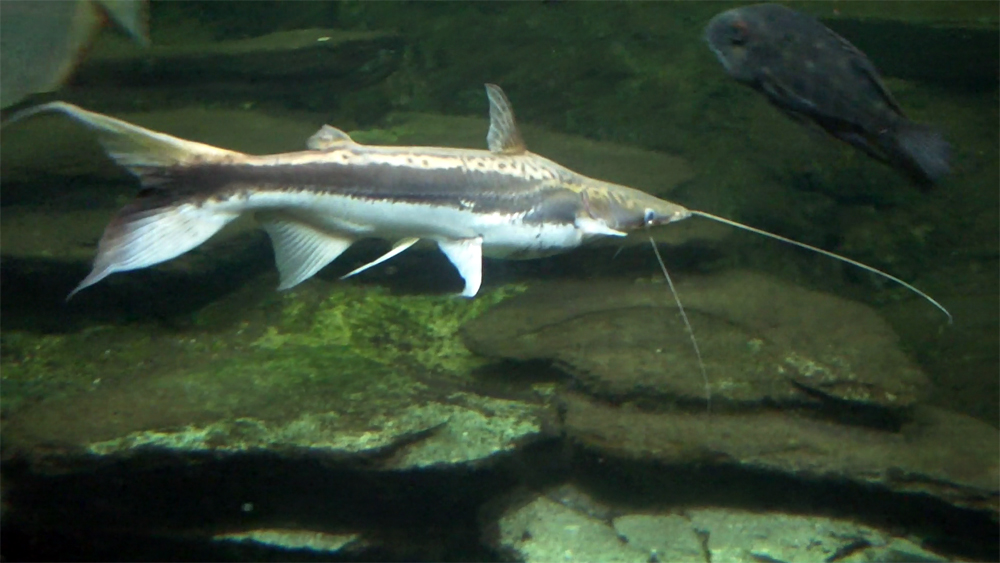
- Sorubim lima

Scientific classification
- Kingdom: Animalia
- Phylum: Chordata
- Class: Actinopterygii
- Order: Siluriformes
- Family: Pimelodidae
- Genus: Sorubim; G. Cuvier, 1829

Type species
- Silurus lima Bloch & Schneider, 1801

Synonyms
- Platystoma Spix & Agassiz, 1829; Sorubium Swainson, 1838; Abron Gistel, 1848

= Sorubim =

Genus of fishes

Sorubim is a small genus of long-whiskered catfish native to tropical South America. A number of characteristics allows the differentiation of each species in the genus. Sorubim species are important food fish in South America and are highly significant to fisheries of some areas; however, harvests of these fish are not identified as much as other, more popular food fishes such as Colossoma, Arapaima, and Brachyplatystoma. Some species of this family are popular aquarium fish.

== Taxonomy ==
The genus name is derived from a Brazilian local name, sorubí. The description of Sorubim has been attributed to both Cuvier and Agassiz in 1829, but because Cuvier's description predates that of Agassiz by two months, Cuvier's is valid. Later, Sorubim lima, originally described as Siluris lima in 1801, was designated as the type species by Bleeker in 1862.

In 2007, this genus was reviewed, validating five species. S. lima and S. trigonocephalus are redescribed in this paper. This genus is monophyletic.

== Species ==
The currently recognized species in this genus are:

- Sorubim cuspicaudus Littmann, Burr & Nass, 2000 (trans-Andean shovelnose catfish)
- Sorubim elongatus Littmann, Burr, Schmidt & Isern, 2001 (slender shovelnose catfish)
- Sorubim lima (Bloch & Schneider, 1801) (duckbill catfish)
- Sorubim maniradii Littmann, Burr & Buitrago-Suárez, 2001
- Sorubim trigonocephalus Miranda-Ribeiro, 1920 (arrowhead shovelnose catfish)

== Distribution and habitat ==
Sorubim is a widely distributed genus, collected from many major river basins in 10 countries. S. lima is the most widely distributed species of the genus, found east of the Andes in the Amazon, Orinoco, Paraná, and Parnaíba basins. Initially it did not occur in the upper Paraná basin above the Guaíra Falls, but these disappeared after the construction of the Itaipu Dam, allowing this species (and several others) to spread. It is syntopic with S. elongatus in the Orinoco basin and with S. elongatus and S. maniradii in the upper Amazon drainage of Brazil, Ecuador, Peru, and Bolivia. S. maniradii was discovered in the Napo and Yasuni River drainages of Ecuador, but also occurs in other tributaries of the Amazon. S. elongatus is found in the Amazon, Orinoco, and Essequibo River basins. S. cuspicaudus is found in northern Colombia and inhabits Lake Maracaibo, Sinu River, Cauca River, and Magdalena River basins. S. trigonocephalus was initially considered very rare as only three specimens were known by 2007. Later many more specimens have been collected and the species is relatively common. It is found only in the Tapajós and Xingu basins in Brazil. The type locality of S. trigonocephalus has been reported as the Madeira River, but the species does not occur there and the correct locality is now recognized to be the Arinos River, a part of the Tapajós basin.

Sorubim species are found in fast-moving and slow-moving waters, including lakes, rivers, and bays. Typically, the substrate is either sand, clay, or mud, associated with reeds, grasses, and roots. They are not found as often over substrates of strictly sand or mud. They are also not found as commonly in clearer blackwater habitats. S. elongatus occurs in both whitewater and blackwater, found in floodplain lakes and small creeks to large rivers. S. lima is commonly found in schools.

== Anatomy and appearance ==
Sorubim species, like other catfish, possess dorsal and pectoral fin spines. They have a triangular adipose fin. As Pimelodidae, these fish have very long barbels, especially maxillary barbels, which range in length from reaching the pectoral fin to extending past the pelvic fins. Like some other pimelodid genera, these fish may have long filaments on their dorsal, pectoral, and caudal fins; in juveniles, these filaments may be even longer than the body. Sorubim is characterized by a shovel-like, projecting upper jaw with an exposed, villiform (brush-like) premaxillary tooth patch. The head is depressed and usually three times longer than it is wide. The eyes are set laterally and usually visible from below. They have a characteristic black, lateral stripe, variable in width, that extends from the snout to the end of the caudal fin; though this may seem minor, no other pimelodid has a lateral stripe that reaches down the entire length of the head and body.

Along with the lateral stripe, Sorubim species have a darkened dorsal surface, which is sometimes separated by a thinner, lighter-colored band. The dorsal surface may change its shade quickly with its surroundings. S. lima may also display dark blotches or spots on its dorsal surface. The ventral part of the body is white or cream-colored. Light areas may appear golden or slate gray, often appearing iridescent. Young fish are more heavily pigmented than adults. Posterior-most rays on dorsal, anal, and pelvic fins are elongated, darker, and heavily speckled with chromatophores; however, this speckling is reduced in the adults. This could provide camouflage when the fish are young and hiding among plant materials, and is lost when the adults live in more open water habitats.

S. lima appears similar to S. trigonocephalus; however, the latter has a long snout, pointed (triangular) head, and an exposed patch of premaxillary teeth that is as wide as it is long. S. cuspicaudus has a markedly different tail (straight, pointed, and long) in contrast to the other Sorubim with more rounded caudal fin lobes. S. maniradii is differentiated from the other species by a high number of gill rakers, ranging from 31–37, compared to the 13–23 of the other Sorubim species, as well as a more diffused lateral stripe. S. elongatus has an elongated head and body, and appears rather slender in comparison to the other members of this genus.

S. cuspicaudus is the largest species in the genus, reaching up to 80 cm (31 in) in standard length. S. trigonocephalus and S. lima reach a length of almost 55 cm (22 in). By contrast, S. elongatus and S. maniradii only reach about half that length, about 32 cm (13 in) in the former and 26 cm (10 in) in the latter.

== Ecology ==
Because of the natural whitewater habitats of these fish, which makes natural observation difficult, most observations of the behavior of this fish is largely known from study of fish in aquaria. Natural history and reproduction of this fish are not well known. When inactive, these fish often swim in a vertical posture, probably to help blend into stems of reeds and other aquatic plants; when active, they swim in a normal, horizontal manner. They may use this camouflage either to hide from predators or as part of ambush predation. These fish feed on fish and crustaceans, and as adults are largely piscivorous. Sorubim species have been observed in captivity to excavate a small pit as a nest and even to guard freshly hatched young (unfortunately, none of these young survived).

These fish are nocturnal and occur in groups or schools.

== In the aquarium ==
S. lima has been in the aquarium trade for many years, and is the most common species found in the aquarium trade. S. elongatus also appears rather often, and is sold as S. lima.

This fish is lazy and slow-moving; being nocturnal, it will usually hide during the day. It will accept most food, but also can consume smaller fish. It is hardy, and the pH is not of great importance, but slightly acidic is best. This fish requires a large aquarium. This fish prefers a current as well as clean water. It has not yet been bred in captivity.
