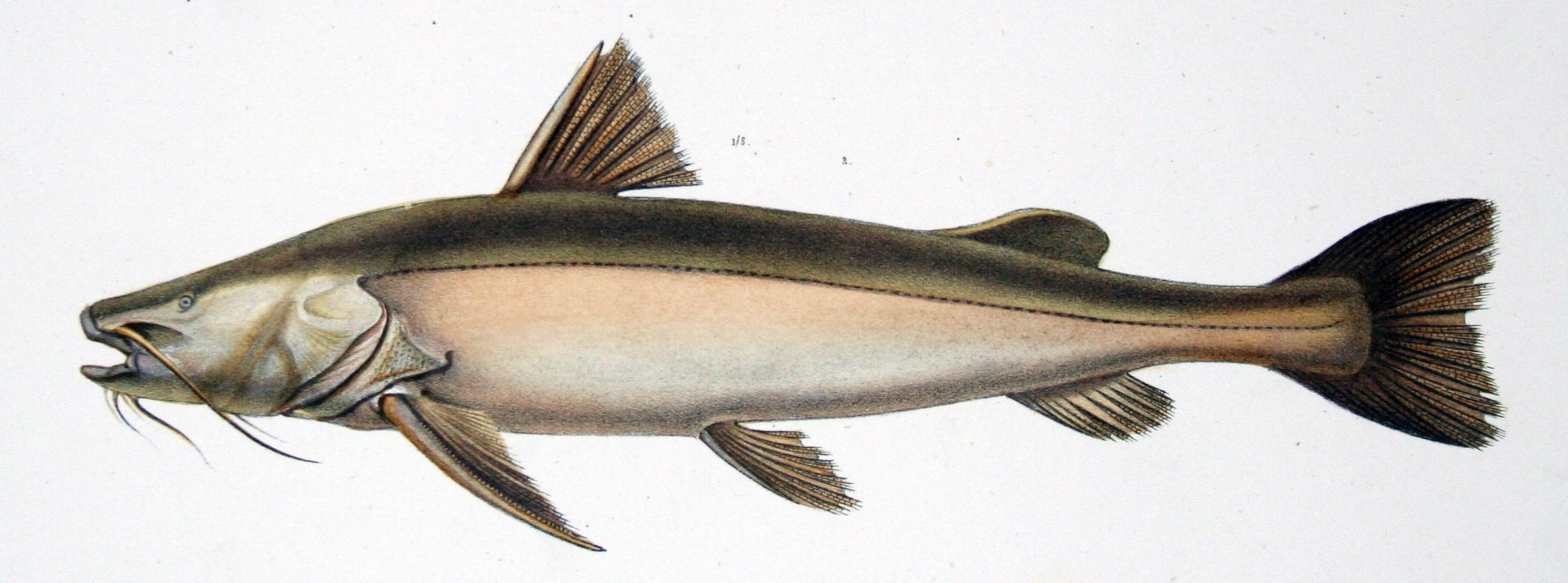
- Zungaro zungaro

Scientific classification
- Kingdom: Animalia
- Phylum: Chordata
- Class: Actinopterygii
- Order: Siluriformes
- Family: Pimelodidae
- Genus: Zungaro; Bleeker, 1858

Type species
- Zungaro humboldtii Bleeker, 1858

Synonyms
- Paulicea Ihering, 1898

= Zungaro =

Genus of fishes

Zungaro is a small genus of long-whiskered catfishes native to South America, with two recognized species as of 2018:

- Zungaro jahu (H. von Ihering, 1898)
- Zungaro zungaro (Humboldt, 1821) (gilded catfish)
