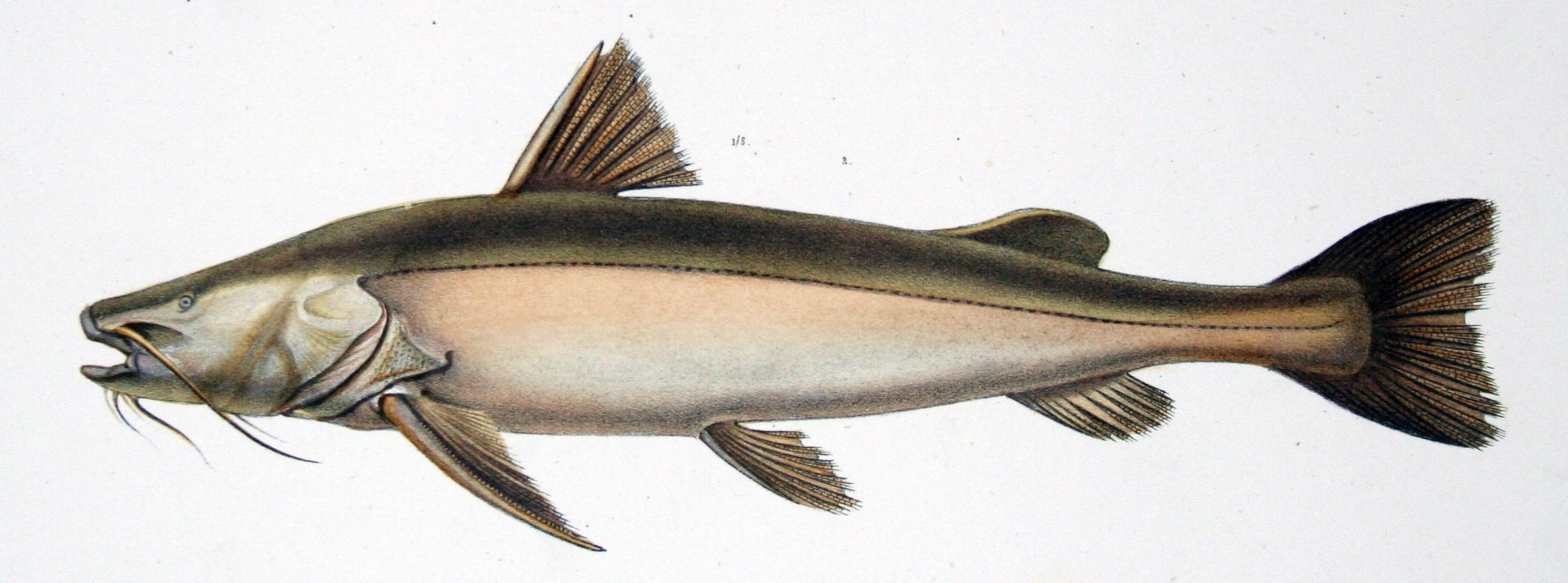
- de Castelnau, 1821
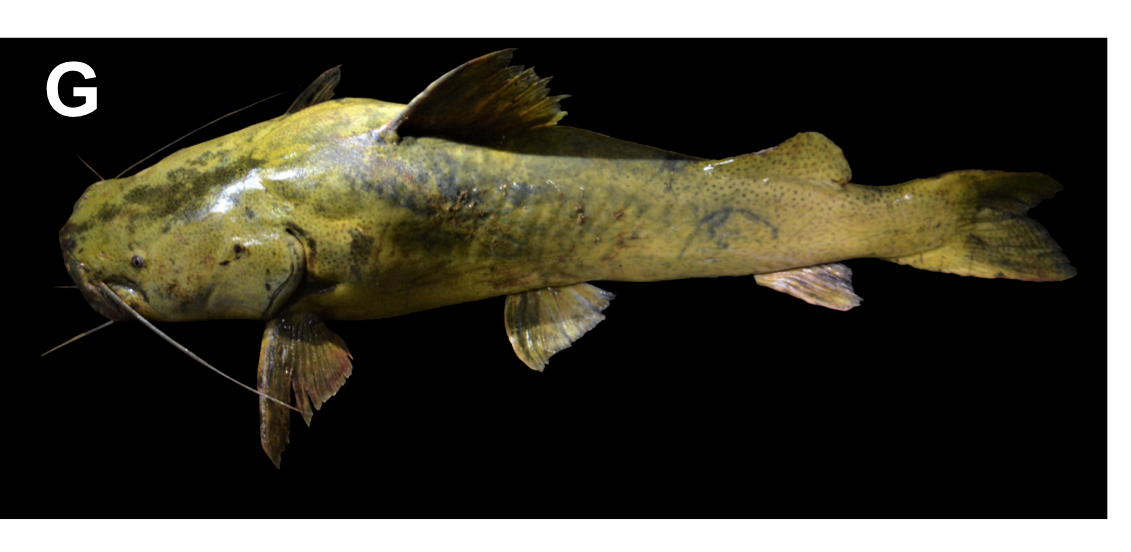
- Napo River basin

Conservation status
- Least Concern (IUCN 3.1)

Scientific classification
- Kingdom: Animalia
- Phylum: Chordata
- Class: Actinopterygii
- Division: Teleostei
- Order: Siluriformes
- Family: Pimelodidae
- Genus: Zungaro
- Species: Z. zungaro

Binomial name
- Zungaro zungaro (Humboldt in Humboldt and Valenciennes, 1821)

Subspecies
- Zungaro zungaro mangurus (Valenciennes, 1835); Zungaro zungaro zungaro (Humboldt, 1821)

Synonyms
- Pimelodus zungaro Humboldt, 1821; Bagrus flavicans Castelnau, 1855; Brachyplatystoma flavicans (Castelnau, 1855); Zungaro humboldtii Bleeker, 1858; Paulicea luetkeni (Steindachner, 1877)

= Gilded catfish =

Species of fish

The gilded catfish, Jau catfish or dourado catfish, (Zungaro zungaro) is a South American catfish (order Siluriformes) of the family Pimelodidae. It is also known as manguruyu or black manguruyu.

== Taxonomy ==
By some sources, it is the only species of the monotypic genus Zungaro. However, some sources list other species as valid, such as Zungaro jahu. This species may be referred to by one of its synonyms, Brachyplatystoma flavicans. This species contains two subspecies, Z. z. mangurus and Z. z. zungaro.

== Distribution and habitat ==
They are sexually mature upon reaching 10 kg (22 lb) weight. This fish native to the Orinoco and Amazon basins; in the Amazon, this fish is found quite upstream, in the main bed of the big tributaries with muddy bottoms.

== Description ==
This fish reaches 140 cm (55 in) in total length, and specimens measuring 130 cm (51 in) and weighing 50 kg (110 lb) are not rare. These fish are mainly piscivorous, hunt at night, and sometimes go into flood-prone areas of rivers. Some migrations in pursuit of migrating Triportheus and Anodus have been reported. The nursery ground is at the mouths of rivers.
