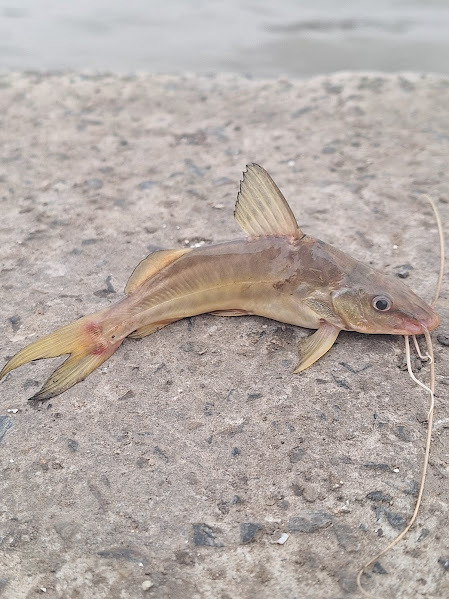
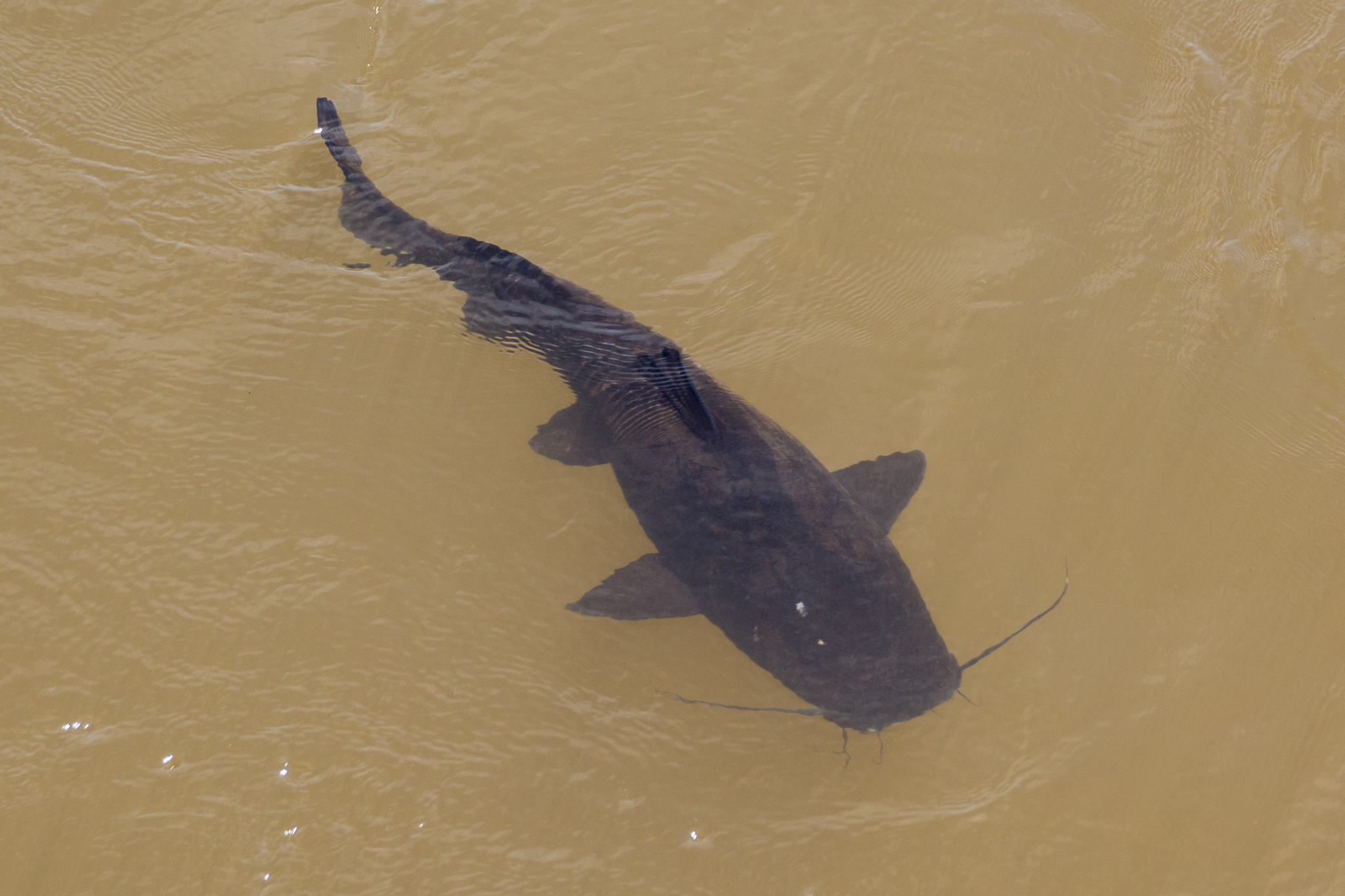
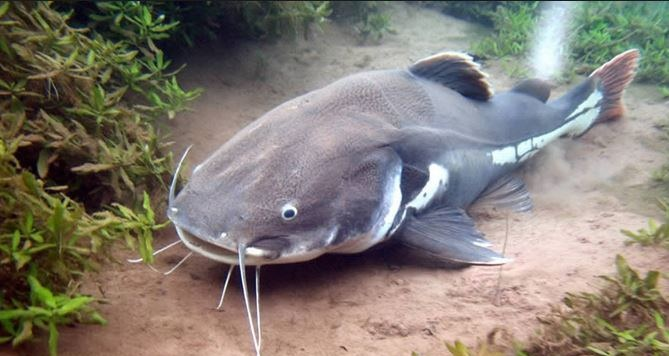
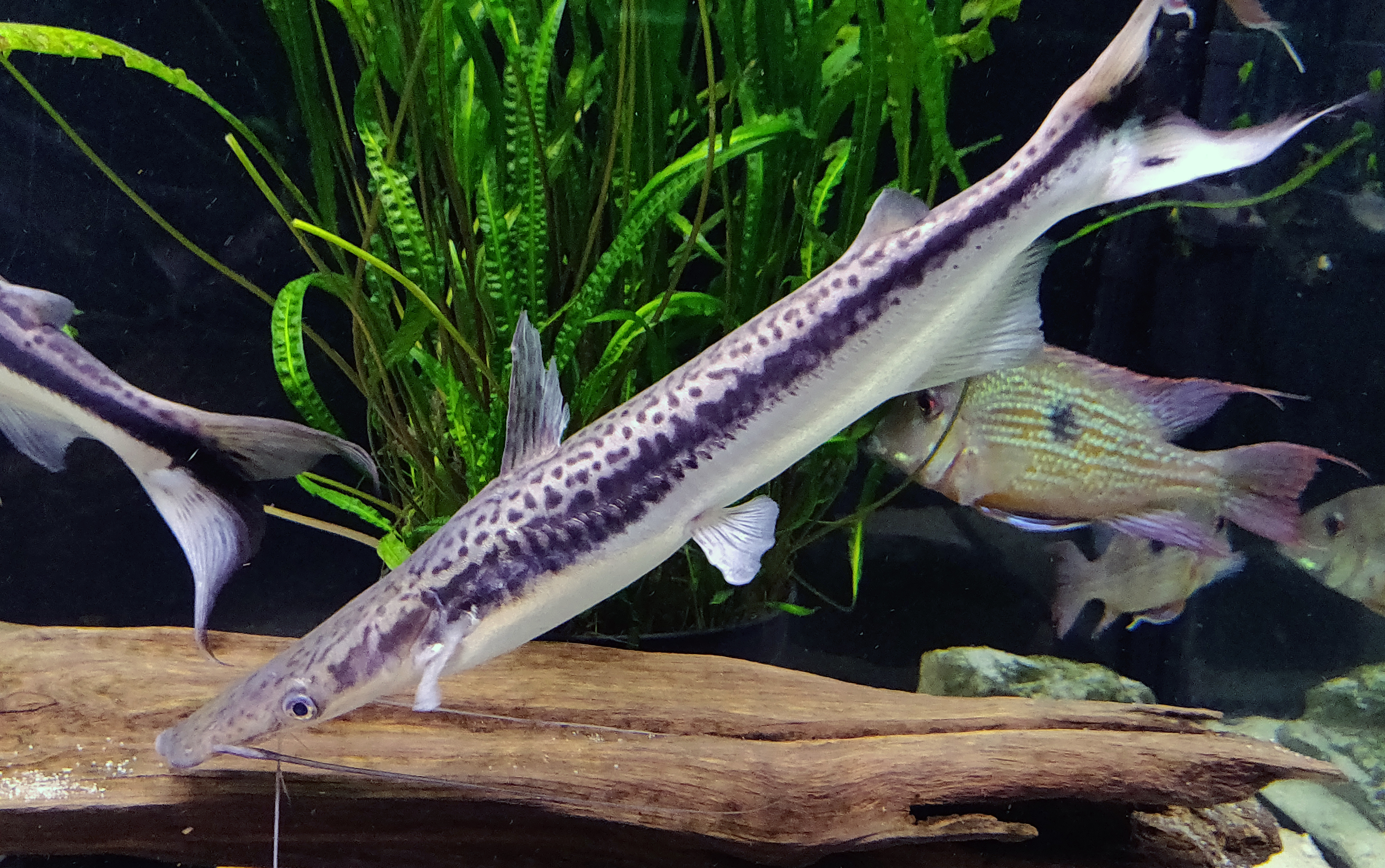
- Representatives of Pimelodidae's clades

Scientific classification
- Kingdom: Animalia
- Phylum: Chordata
- Class: Actinopterygii
- Division: Teleostei
- Order: Siluriformes
- Superfamily: Pimelodoidea
- Family: Pimelodidae; Swaison, 1838

Genera
- See text

= Pimelodidae =

Pimelodidae Temporal range: Oligocene–Recent

Family of fishes

The Pimelodidae, commonly known as the long-whiskered catfishes, are a family of catfishes (order Siluriformes) native to South America. The family has a wide variety of body plans, and includes the largest South American catfish species, the piraíba. Many species, including the piraíba, are locally valued as food, and even more species are of interest to aquaria.

== Description ==
Akin to other catfish, pimelodids are scaleless, and have three pairs of barbels, with the maxillary pair often reaching the length of the fish's body. Members of the family are characterized by the combination of naked skin (without scales and bony plates), branched or anastomosing lateral line canals on the head and front of the body, separate nostrils without barbels, well-developed adipose fins, and a tail/caudal fin deeply emarginated, lobed, or forked. Many long-whiskered catfishes grow larger than 50 cm (20 in); the largest is the piraíba (Brachyplatystoma filamentosum), which is reported to reach about 3.6 metres (12 ft) in length and 200 kilograms (440 lb) in weight..

Many species of Pimelodidae have distinct juvenile forms, differing to the adults in color pattern as well as body shape. For example, Brachyplatystoma species have specialized pelagic young with greatly elongated barbels and fin filaments, along with strongly ornamented pectoral fin spines. Other large pimelodids, such as Pseudoplatystoma, Sorubim, and Sorubimichthys, whose young inhabit vegetated, marginal waters, have distinctive cryptic coloration patterns and much enlarged caudal and pectoral fins.

== Taxonomy ==
The family Pimelodidae has undergone much taxonomic revision. Historically, this family included the families Pseudopimelodidae (previously subfamily Pseudopimelodinae) and Heptapteridae (previously subfamily Rhamdiinae). This family also previously included Conorhynchos conirostris, currently considered incertae sedis. However, a 2006 molecular analysis has shown unequivocal support for monophyly of the individual families and the genus Conorhynchos into a clade called Pimelodoidea, which includes Pimelodidae + Pseudopimelodidae and Heptapteridae + Conorhynchos. Conversely, the low-eye catfish (Hypophthalmus, previously in the family Hypophthalmidae), is now considered a pimelodid.

Eschmeyer's Catalog of Fishes (ECoF) lists 30 genera and 121 species in this family. The following genera are considered valid by the World Register of Marine Species, which follows ECoF:

- Aguarunichthys
- Bagropsis
- Bergiaria
- Brachyplatystoma
- Calophysus
- Cheirocerus
- Duopalatinus
- Exallodontus
- Hemisorubim
- Hypophthalmus
- Iheringichthys
- Leiarius
- Luciopimelodus
- Megalonema
- Parapimelodus
- Perrunichthys
- Phractocephalus
- Pimelabditus
- Pimelodina
- Pimelodus
- Pinirampus
- Platynematichthys
- Platysilurus
- Platystomatichthys
- Propimelodus
- Pseudoplatystoma
- Sorubim
- Sorubimichthys
- Steindachneridion
- Zungaro
- Zungaropsis

Interfamilial classification of the group has been attempted a number of times by different teams: a 2002 study found six main clades within Pimelodidae, these being Steindachneridion, the Phractocephalus-Leiarius group, the Pimelodus group, the Calophysus group, Zungaro, and the Sorubim group. The Pimelodus group includes Pimelodus, Exallodontus, Duopalatinus, Cheirocerus, Iheringichthys, Bergiaria, Bagropsis, Parapimelodus, Platysilurus, Platystomatichthys, and Propimelodus. The Calophysus group includes the five genera Aguarunichthys, Pimelodina, Calophysus, Luciopimelodus, and Pinirampus. Another study reexamined this relationship using nuclear and mitochondrial gene sequences.

The following cladogram is based on a 2024 phylogenetic study using Bayesian inference; notably, this study agrees with the groups proposed in 2002 (as discussed above), though Calophysus and Zungaro were subsumed into the proposed groups, here considered subfamilies:

- - Doradidae
  - Auchenipteridae
- - Pseudopimelodidae
  - - Heptapteridae
    - Pimelodidae
      - Steindachneridion
      - - - Phractocephalus
          - Leiarius
        - - Sorubiminae
            ⊞
            ⊟
            - Zungaro
            - - - Sorubim
                - - Sorubimichthys
                  - Pseudoplatystoma
              - - - Hemisorubim
                  - - Platysilurus
                    - Platystomatichthys
                - - Brachyplatystoma
                  - - Brachyplatystoma flavicans
                    - Hypophthalmus
          - Pimelodinae
            ⊞
            ⊟
            - Pimelodus ornatus
            - - - - Cheirocerus
                  - Megalonema
                - - Pimelodina
                  - - Calophysus
                    - - Luciopimelodus
                      - Pinirampus
              - - - Pimelodus altissimus
                  - - Propimelodus
                    - Exallodontus
                - - Duopalatinus
                  - - Pimelodus grosskopfii
                    - - Pimelodus maculatus clade
                      - Pimelodus blochii clade

The relationships within each genus are also still being studied; many genera may not be monophyletic, possibly being "unnatural" groupings that do not accurately reflect common descent.

== Distribution ==
All species of Pimelodidae are found in South America and the lower Isthmian region, being present in Panama and north to southernmost Mexico. The southern limits of the family's range is the Paraná River basin.

== Ecology ==
They are generally bottom-living fish, though a number of species are benthopelagic, and a few species, such as Parapimelodus, are thought to filter feed, straining water with their elongated close-set gill rakers. They do not guard their young.

== Relationship to humans ==
Because of their large size in many species, pimelodids are an important food fish in their native South America. Some species have been hybridized through the use of hormone-induced spawning in an effort to get even larger fish; one such example is the common Phractocephalus × Pseudoplatystoma hybrid, which is also bred as an ornamental. This same size factor also makes them very popular for sport fishing.

=== In aquaria ===
Pimelodids are a common addition to Amazonian-themed exhibits in zoos and public aquaria. Despite the looming danger of size in many species, pimelodids remain a popular home aquarium fish. Controversy exists over whether or not many of the larger species should be sold in the hobby because of their adult size. Also, some disagreement occurs over hybrids appearing in the hobby, as well. Many species are hardy and easy to take care of. However, it should be taken into consideration what other fish to house pimelodids with, as they do not hesitate to eat other fish that are small enough.

== See also ==
- List of fish families
