= Bergiaria =

Scientific classification
- Kingdom: Animalia
- Phylum: Chordata
- Class: Actinopterygii
- Order: Siluriformes
- Family: Pimelodidae
- Genus: Bergiaria; C. H. Eigenmann & Norris, 1901

Type species
- Pimelodus westermanni Lütken, 1874

Synonyms
- Bergiella; Eigenmann & Norris, 1900

Genus of fishes

Bergiaria is a small genus of long-whiskered catfishes native to South America.

== Species ==
There are currently two recognized species in this genus:

- Bergiaria platana (Steindachner, 1908)
- Bergiaria westermanni (Lütken, 1874)
