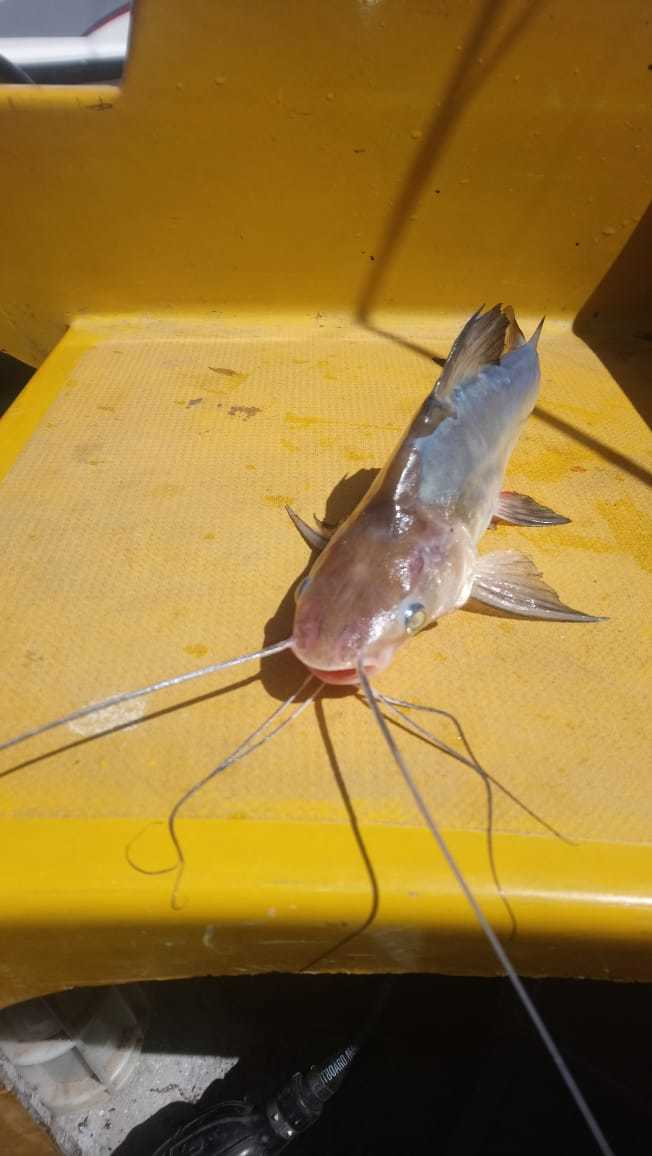
- Parapimelodus valenciennis

Scientific classification
- Domain: Eukaryota
- Kingdom: Animalia
- Phylum: Chordata
- Class: Actinopterygii
- Order: Siluriformes
- Family: Pimelodidae
- Genus: Parapimelodus; La Monte, 1933

Type species
- Pimelodus valenciennis Lütken, 1874

= Parapimelodus =

Genus of fishes

Parapimelodus is a small genus of long-whiskered catfishes native to South America.

== Species ==
There are currently two recognized species in this genus:

- Parapimelodus nigribarbis (Boulenger, 1889)
- Parapimelodus valenciennis (Lütken, 1874)

== Distribution ==
The two species of Parapimelodus are isolated from each other. P. valenciennis is known from the Uruguay, La Plata, Paraguay, and the lower to middle Paraná Rivers. P. nigribarbis is restricted to the Lagoa dos Patos system.

== Description ==
The body is compressed and becomes strongly compressed at the tail. The head is slightly depressed and the mouth is slightly inferior, with the upper jaw longer than the lower jaw. There is one pair of maxillary barbels and two mental. The dorsal and pectoral fin spines are strong and pungent.

These fish have a silvery-grey dorsal surface and a whitish or slightly yellowish ventral surface. The barbels are usually dark. Unpaired fins are usually strongly pigmented with melanophores, while paired fins are less strongly pigmented.

== Ecology ==
Species of Parapimelodus have extremely long gill rakers and more than 55 gill rakers on the first branchial arch, which is related to feeding on plankton. They also have very large eyes on the sides of the head that can be seen both from above and below, which is related to independence from the bottom in locomotion and feeding; though a common trait in many other catfish, it is rare in Pimelodids.

P. valenciennis has a possible greater abundance in lagoons than other catfish. P. nigribarbis is the most abundant species in beam trawling at the Saco de Tapes, Lagoa dos Patos.
