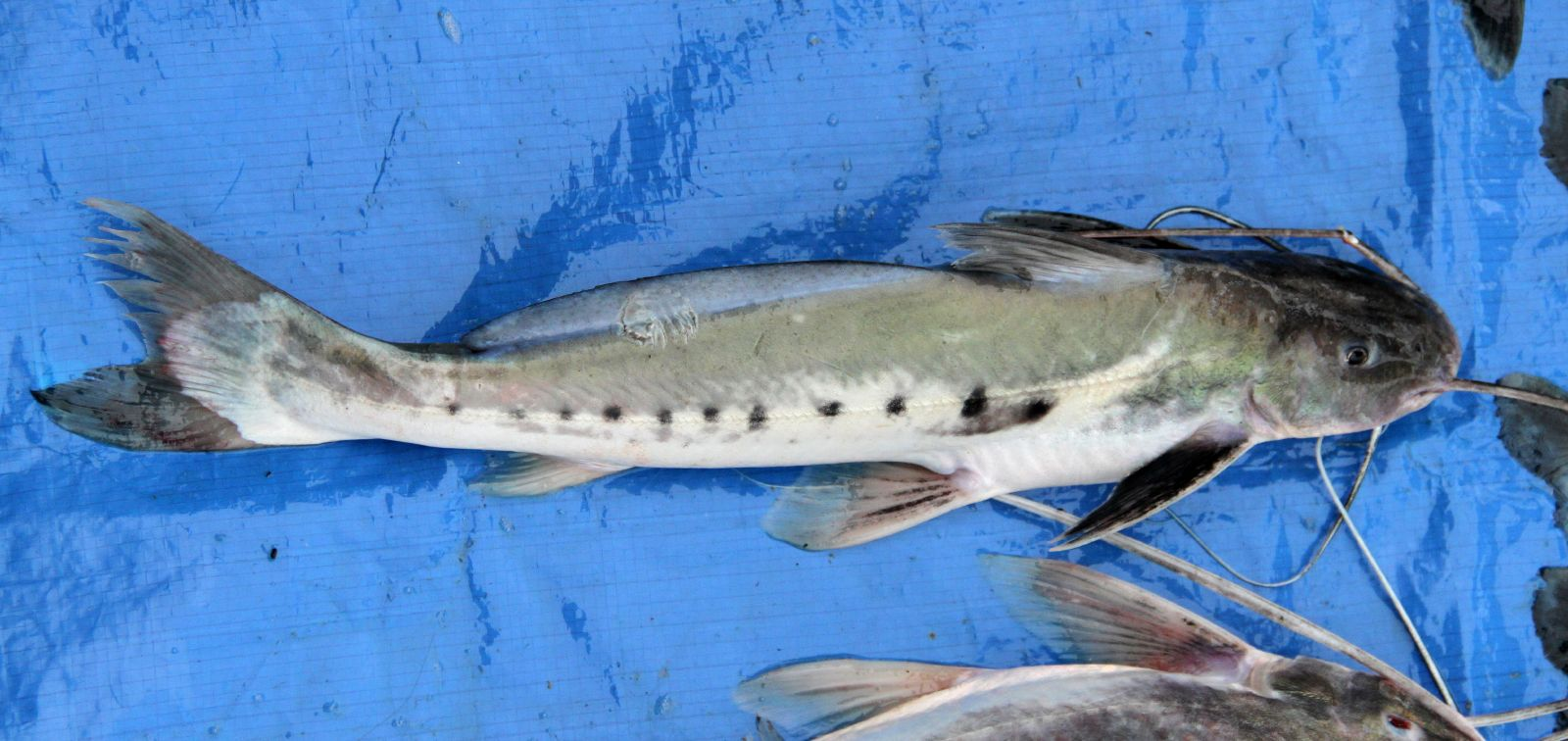

Conservation status
- Least Concern (IUCN 3.1)

Scientific classification
- Kingdom: Animalia
- Phylum: Chordata
- Class: Actinopterygii
- Order: Siluriformes
- Family: Pimelodidae
- Genus: Calophysus; Müller & Troschel in Müller, 1843
- Species: C. macropterus

Binomial name
- Calophysus macropterus (Lichtenstein, 1819)

Synonyms
- Pimelodes macropterus Lichtenstein, 1819; Pimelodus ctenodus Spix & Agassiz, 1829; Pimeletropis lateralis Gill, 1859

= Calophysus macropterus =

Species of fish

Calophysus macropterus, known natively as the piracatinga/pirácatina, piranambú, pintadinho, zamurito, water buzzard, or by its popular English name vulture catfish, is a species of catfish (order Siluriformes) of the monotypic genus Calophysus of the family Pimelodidae. It is sometimes placed in its own family, Calophysidae.

== Description ==
This species reaches 40 centimetres (16 in) SL, though lengths of 71 centimetres (28 in) have been reported. It originates from the Amazon and Orinoco basins, which encompasses waterways in Brazil, Bolivia, Colombia, Peru, and Venezuela.

The vulture catfish is so named because it is an active scavenger, seeking carcasses in its native waterways to consume in shoals; its feeding action promotes the skeletonization of its food items - they are able to consume all the muscles and viscera from an 80 kilograms (180 lb) cadaver within half an hour - though it apparently avoids feeding on cartilage elements, eyeballs, scalps, and limb extremities. Its voracious nature has led to it becoming an important species in forensic pathology, especially concerning those victims whose corpses ended up in rivers; C. macropterus is often found in association with the cadaver even after it is extracted from the water, often being found under the victim's clothing. This species is also stated to commonly attack fish caught in fishermen's nets and seines as well as those hooked on trotlines or gaffed. They also seem to congregate in areas where fishermen and fishmongers dispose of fish offal.

== In the aquarium ==
This fish is one of the smaller pimelodids available in the trade, and may be appropriate for a large aquarium. It is an adaptable and hardy species. Tankmates should be chosen with great care as this fish has the ability to bite and tear off pieces of flesh, although many who have actually kept the fish report no apparent signs of aggression.
