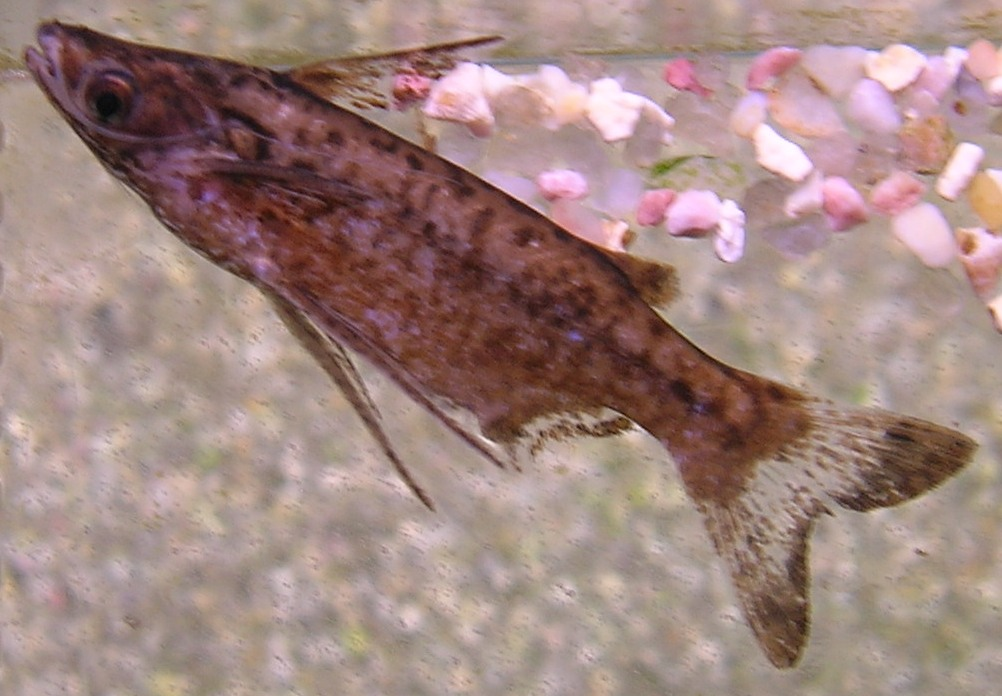
- Transformed male Entomocorus radiosus

Scientific classification
- Kingdom: Animalia
- Phylum: Chordata
- Class: Actinopterygii
- Order: Siluriformes
- Family: Auchenipteridae
- Subfamily: Auchenipterinae
- Genus: Entomocorus; C. H. Eigenmann, 1917

Type species
- Entomocorus benjamini C. H. Eigenmann, 1917

= Entomocorus =

Genus of fishes

Entomocorus is a genus of catfishes (order Siluriformes) of the family Auchenipteridae.

== Taxonomy and phylogeny ==
Entomocorus was first described by Carl H. Eigenmann in 1917 with E. benjamini as type species by monotypy. Only a few phylogenetic diagnoses have been presented since.

Entomocorus is included as the basal member in the Auchenipterus-Group by Carl H. Ferraris; this group also includes Auchenipterus and the sister groups Epapterus and Pseudepapterus. This group is sister to the Ageneiosus-Group, which includes the genera Ageneiosus and Tetranematichthys. These groups, along with the genus Trachelyopterus, form the tribe Auchenipterini. However, the placement of Entomocorus is problematic due to the loss of some characteristics of that diagnose Auchenipteridae and Auchenipterini. Relationships between species of Entomocorus are unknown.

== Species ==
There are currently four described species in this genus:

- Entomocorus benjamini C. H. Eigenmann, 1917
- Entomocorus gameroi Mago-Leccia, 1984
- Entomocorus melaphareus Akama & Ferraris, 2003
- Entomocorus radiosus R. E. dos Reis & Borges, 2006

== Distribution ==
Entomocorus species are all found in lowlands east of the Andes in South America.

== Description ==
Entomocorus species are small fish, growing to 5.3–7.0 centimetres SL. Sexual dimorphism is evident in all species except for E. benjamini; in this species, transformed males have yet to be found. In the other species, transformed males have stiff, ossified maxillary barbels, an elongated dorsal-fin spine, ventrally-directed pectoral-fin spine hooks, very elongated pelvic-fin unbranched rays, and a rotated anal-fin base.

The four different Entomocorus species are not easily distinguished by differences in meristics or morphometrics; however, they can easily be distinguished by pigmentation, especially in caudal fin markings. In E. benjamini, the distal half of dorsal caudal fin lobe and the edge of the ventral lobe is pigmented. In E. gameroi, an oblique band crossing from the dorsal profile of the caudal peduncle to the middle-upper rays of the caudal fin. In E. melaphareus, an inconspicuous patch exists on the dorsal lobe of the caudal fin. In E. radiosus, the distal half of both the dorsal and ventral caudal fin lobes is pigmented. E. melaphareus also has pigmented pectoral and pelvic fins, while these fins in the other three species are unpigmented. E. radiosus is the only species that can be diagnosed by meristics; its anal-fin base is longer and has more branched anal-fin rays.

== Ecology ==
Entomocorus are nocturnal, pelagic catfish that feed near the surface on invertebrates (primarily insects) and on zooplankton (mainly microcrustaceans).
