= Trachelyopterus insignis =

Conservation status
- Least Concern (IUCN 3.1)

Scientific classification
- Kingdom: Animalia
- Phylum: Chordata
- Class: Actinopterygii
- Order: Siluriformes
- Family: Auchenipteridae
- Genus: Trachelyopterus
- Species: T. insignis

Binomial name
- Trachelyopterus insignis (Steindachner, 1878)
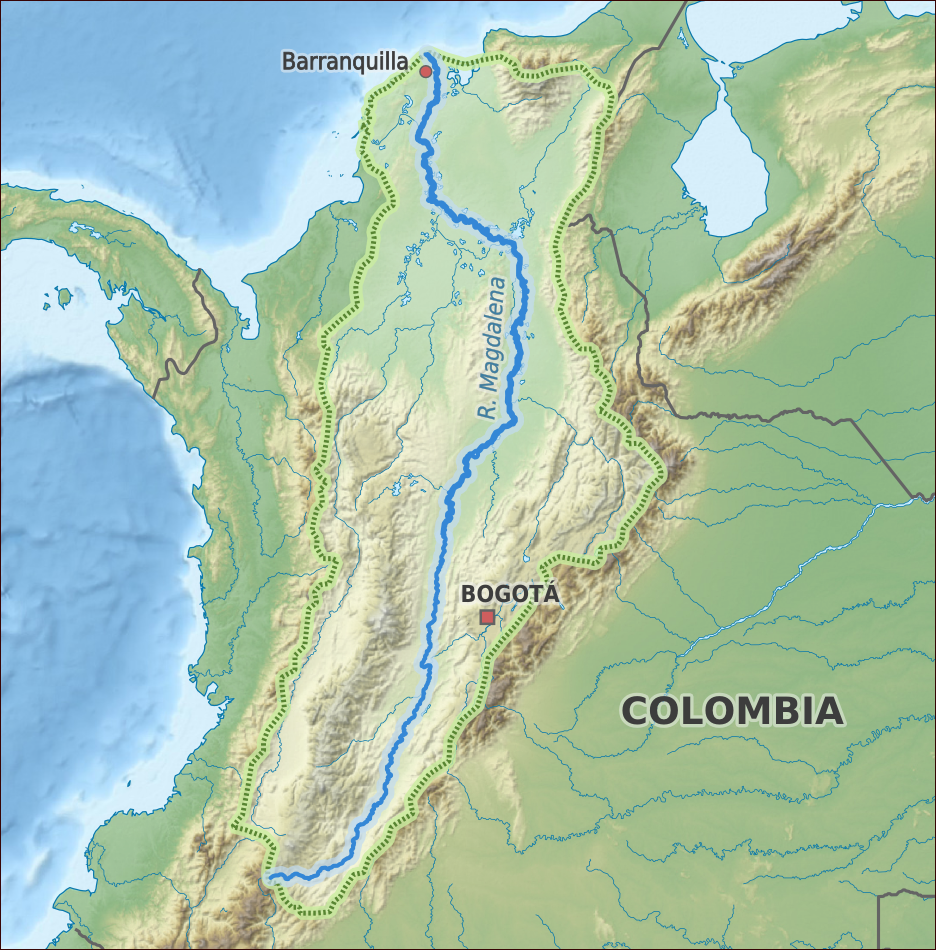
- T. insignis is only found in the Rio Magdalena watershed (outlined).

Synonyms
- Parauchenipterus insignis (Steindachner, 1878); Auchenipterus enae (Steindachner, 1878); Auchenipterus insignis (Steindachner, 1878)

Species of fish

Trachelyopterus insignis is a species of catfish from the freshwater driftwood catfish family, Auchenipteridae. It is commonly found in rivers of northern South America, where it is called the chivo (lit. "goat"), the rengue, or the doncella (lit. "maiden").

== Taxonomy and naming ==
The species was formally described in 1878 by the Austrian zoologist Franz Steindachner from Colombia's Rio Magdelena. Steindachner originally placed T. insignis in the genus Auchenipterus, another group of driftwood catfishes, and it has also been moved into Parauchenipterus, which is no longer considered valid.

== Description ==
This catfish is sexually dimorphic. At a young age the sexes differ mainly in coloration; males are mottled, females are plain. Once sexual maturity is reached, however, males grow a large dorsal spine. Males can reach a 20 cm total length.

== Distribution and habitat ==
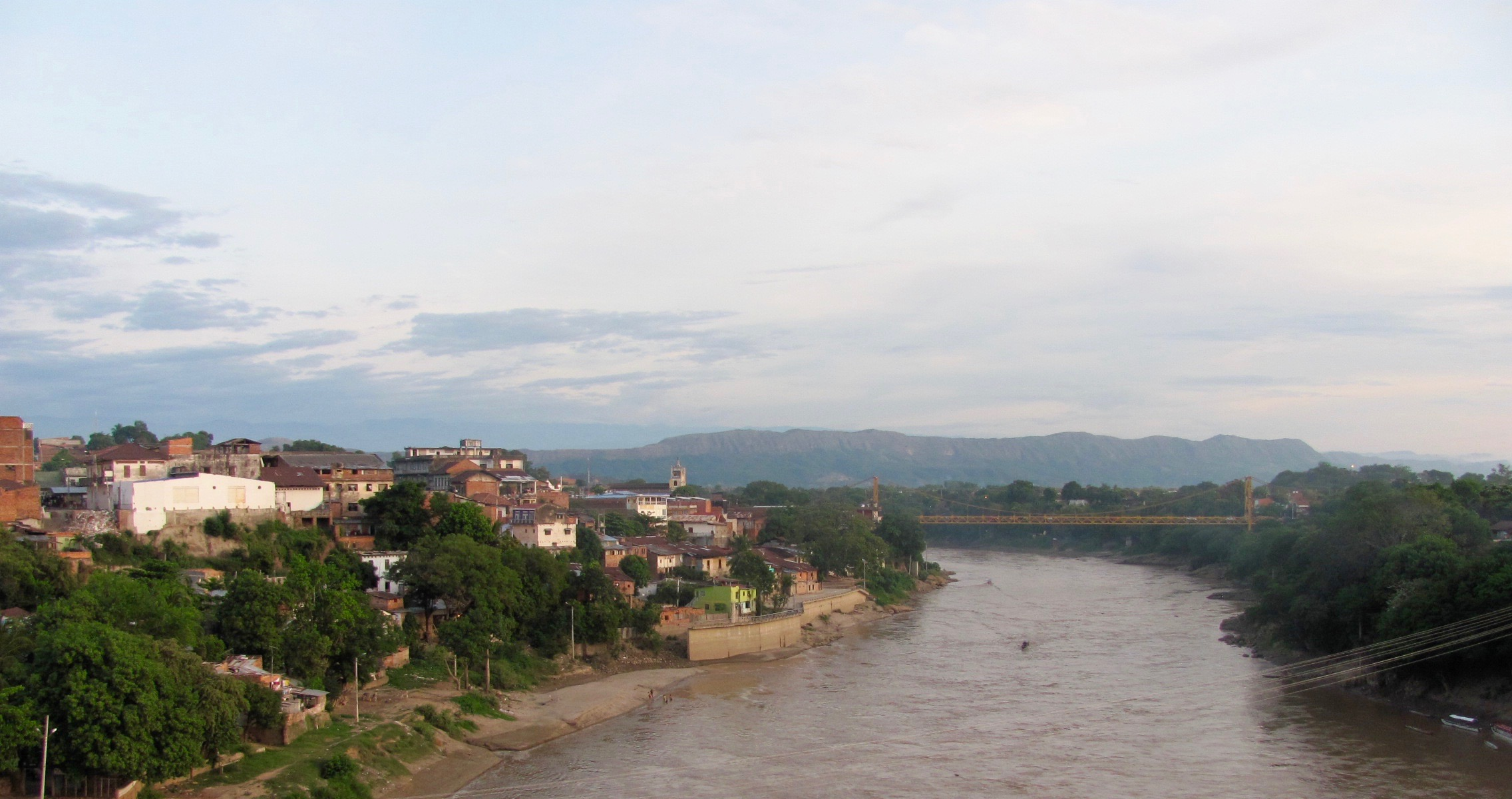
The Rio Magalena near Girardot, Colombia

T. insignis is exclusively freshwater and is endemic to the lower Rio Magdalena river basin of Colombia. It lives close to the bottom of whatever body of water it inhabits and prefers as pH range of 6.0–7.2 as well as water between 23 and 38 °C (73 and 100 °F), temperatures common for waters at tropical latitudes It can be found in rivers of all sizes, as well as smaller creeks and floodplains.

== Behavior ==
Like many other members of the driftwood catfishes, T. insignis is nocturnal, hiding in logs during the daytime, and venturing outside at night to feed.

== Relationship with humans ==
According to the IUCN, T. insignis is not currently threatened in any specific way, nor have any actions been taken to ensure its survival. Other studies have found it to have a low to moderate risk of extinction.

While not present in the freshwater aquarium trade, these fishes have been bred in captivity: with a gravel substrate and floating watersprite plants.

== See also ==
- Trachelyopterus lucenai
