= Trachelyichthys decaradiatus =

Scientific classification
- Kingdom: Animalia
- Phylum: Chordata
- Class: Actinopterygii
- Order: Siluriformes
- Family: Auchenipteridae
- Genus: Trachelyichthys
- Species: T. decaradiatus

Binomial name
- Trachelyichthys decaradiatus Mees, 1974

Species of fish

Trachelyichthys decaradiatus is a species of driftwood catfish endemic to Guyana where it is found in the Rupununi River basin. It grows to a length of 8.0 cm and grows in fresh water.
