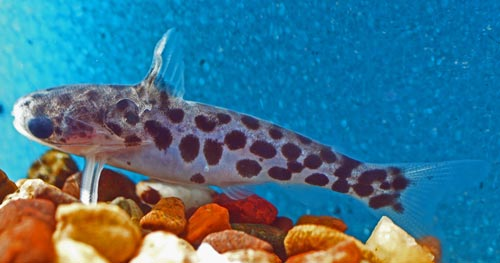
- Centromochlus schultzi

Scientific classification
- Kingdom: Animalia
- Phylum: Chordata
- Class: Actinopterygii
- Order: Siluriformes
- Family: Auchenipteridae
- Subfamily: Centromochlinae
- Genus: Centromochlus; Kner, 1858

Type species
- Centromochlus megalops Kner, 1858

Synonyms
- Balroglanis (subgenus of Centromochlus) Grant, 2015; Sauronglanis (subgenus of Centromochlus) Grant, 2015

= Centromochlus =

Genus of fishes

Centromochlus is a genus of fish in the family Auchenipteridae native to South America.

== Species ==
There are currently 9 recognized species in this genus:

- Centromochlus akwae Coelho, Chamon & Sarmento-Soares, 2021
- Centromochlus carolae (Vari & Ferraris, 2013)
- Centromochlus existimatus Mees, 1974
- Centromochlus heckelii (De Filippi, 1853)
- Centromochlus macracanthus Soares-Porto, 2000
- Centromochlus melanoleucus (Vari & Calegari, 2014)
- Centromochlus musaicus (Royero-L., 1992)
- Centromochlus orca Sarmento-Soares, Lazzarotto, Rapp Py-Daniel & Leitão, 2016
- Centromochlus schultzi Rössel, 1962

In addition to the described species, an undescribed species of Centromochlus that closely resembles Centromochlus orca is often sold in the tropical fish hobby. This undescribed form is known as Ninja tatia or Ninja woodcat. This "Tatia" fish has some white spots on the upper black-colored body and more white on the tail fin, compared to Centromochlus musaicus.
