= Ageneiosus uranophthalmus =

Conservation status
- Least Concern (IUCN 3.1)

Scientific classification
- Kingdom: Animalia
- Phylum: Chordata
- Class: Actinopterygii
- Order: Siluriformes
- Family: Auchenipteridae
- Genus: Ageneiosus
- Species: A. uranophthalmus

Binomial name
- Ageneiosus uranophthalmus F. R. V. Ribeiro & Rapp Py-Daniel, 2010

Species of fish

Ageneiosus uranophthalmus is a species of driftwood catfish of the family Auchenipteridae. It can be found on the Amazon basin.

== Bibliography ==
- Eschmeyer, William N., ed. 1998. Catalog of Fishes. Special Publication of the Center for Biodiversity Research and Information, num. 1, vol. 1–3. California Academy of Sciences. San Francisco, California, United States. 2905. ISBN 0-940228-47-5.
