= Epapterus dispilurus =

Epapaterus dispilurus

Scientific classification
- Kingdom: Animalia
- Phylum: Chordata
- Class: Actinopterygii
- Order: Siluriformes
- Family: Auchenipteridae
- Genus: Epapterus
- Species: E. dispilurus

Binomial name
- Epapterus dispilurus Cope, 1878

Species of fish

Epapterus dispilurus is a species of driftwood catfish distributed in the central and western parts of the Amazon River basin along and south of the main channel of the Amazon River, and Paraguay River basin in Paraguay, northern Argentina and southern Brazil. E. dispilurus grows to 13.0 cm SL. It inhabits the lower part of larger rivers. They are nocturnal, but are also active during dusk and dawn. They feed on smaller fish.
