= Trachelyopterichthys anduzei =

Scientific classification
- Domain: Eukaryota
- Kingdom: Animalia
- Phylum: Chordata
- Class: Actinopterygii
- Order: Siluriformes
- Family: Auchenipteridae
- Genus: Trachelyopterichthys
- Species: T. anduzei

Binomial name
- Trachelyopterichthys anduzei Ferraris & Fernández, 1987

Species of fish

Trachelyopterichthys anduzei is a species of driftwood catfish endemic to Venezuela where it is found in the upper Orinoco River basin. It grows to a length of 14.0 cm.
