= Entomocorus melaphareus =

Scientific classification
- Kingdom: Animalia
- Phylum: Chordata
- Class: Actinopterygii
- Order: Siluriformes
- Family: Auchenipteridae
- Genus: Entomocorus
- Species: E. melaphareus

Binomial name
- Entomocorus melaphareus Akama & Ferraris, 2003

Species of fish

Entomocorus melaphareus is a species of driftwood catfish endemic to Brazil where it is found in the Amazon River. It grows to a length of 5.9 cm and can be distinguished from its congeners by an inconspicuous patch exists on the dorsal lobe of the caudal fin. It also has pigmented pectoral and pelvic fins, while these fins in the other three species are unpigmented.
