= Tympanopleura piperata =

Conservation status
- Least Concern (IUCN 3.1)

Scientific classification
- Kingdom: Animalia
- Phylum: Chordata
- Class: Actinopterygii
- Order: Siluriformes
- Family: Auchenipteridae
- Genus: Tympanopleura
- Species: T. piperata

Binomial name
- Tympanopleura piperata (C. H. Eigenmann, 1912)

Synonyms
- Ageneiosus piperatus Eigenmann, 1912

Species of fish

Tympanopleura piperata is a species of driftwood catfish of the family Auchenipteridae. It can be found on the Essequibo River, Guyana.
