= Trachycorystes trachycorystes =

Conservation status
- Least Concern (IUCN 3.1)

Scientific classification
- Kingdom: Animalia
- Phylum: Chordata
- Class: Actinopterygii
- Order: Siluriformes
- Family: Auchenipteridae
- Genus: Trachycorystes
- Species: T. trachycorystes

Binomial name
- Trachycorystes trachycorystes (Valenciennes in Cuvier and Valenciennes, 1840)

Synonyms
- Auchenipterus trachycorystes Valenciennes, 1840; Trachycorystes typus Bleeker, 1862; Auchenipterus obscurus Günther, 1863; Trachycorystes obscurus (Günther, 1863)

Species of fish

Trachycorystes trachycorystes, the black catfish, is a species of driftwood catfish found in Brazil, Guyana and Venezuela. It is also sold in the aquarium trade. It grows to a length of 35 cm (14 in).
