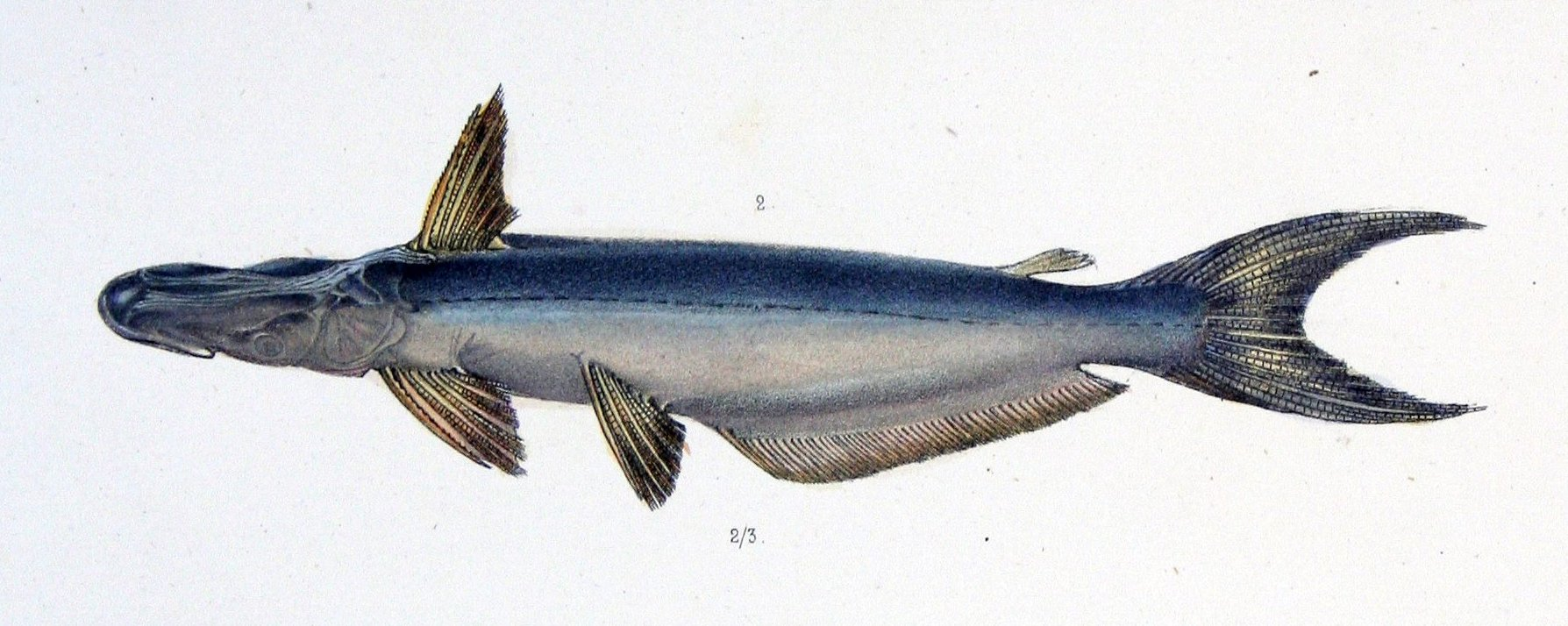

Conservation status
- Least Concern (IUCN 3.1)

Scientific classification
- Kingdom: Animalia
- Phylum: Chordata
- Class: Actinopterygii
- Order: Siluriformes
- Family: Auchenipteridae
- Genus: Ageneiosus
- Species: A. ucayalensis

Binomial name
- Ageneiosus ucayalensis Castelnau, 1855

Synonyms
- Ageneiosus porphyreus Cope, 1867

= Ageneiosus ucayalensis =

Species of fish

Ageneiosus ucayalensis is a species of driftwood catfish of the family Auchenipteridae. It can be found in South America.

== Bibliography ==
- Eschmeyer, William N., ed. 1998. Catalog of Fishes. Special Publication of the Center for Biodiversity Research and Information, num. 1, vol. 1–3. California Academy of Sciences. San Francisco, California, United States. 2905. ISBN 0-940228-47-5.
