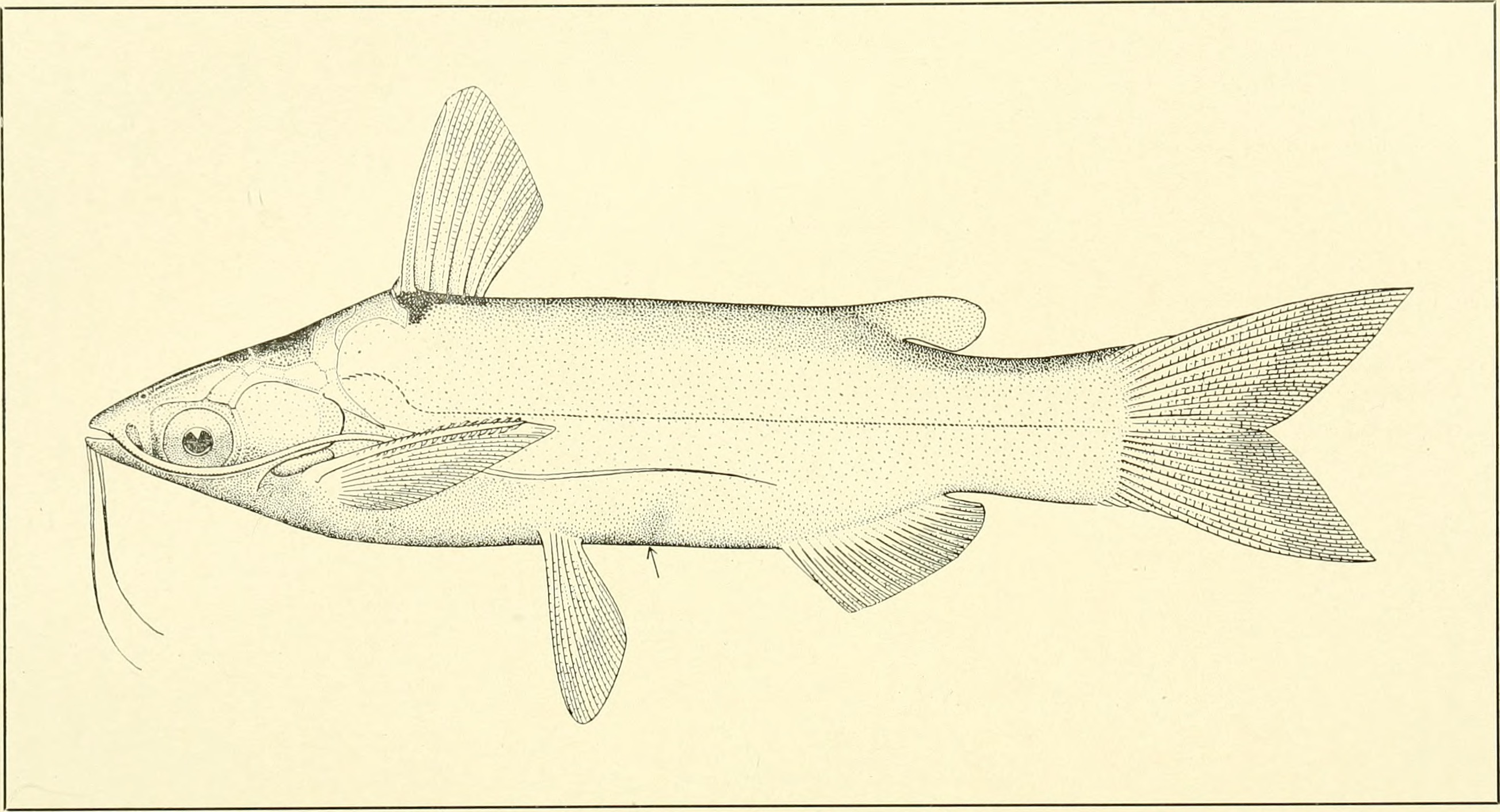

Scientific classification
- Kingdom: Animalia
- Phylum: Chordata
- Class: Actinopterygii
- Order: Siluriformes
- Family: Auchenipteridae
- Genus: Entomocorus
- Species: E. benjamini

Binomial name
- Entomocorus benjamini C. H. Eigenmann, 1917

= Entomocorus benjamini =

Species of fish

Entomocorus benjamini is a species of driftwood catfish found in the Madeira River system in Bolivia and Brazil. This species grows to a length of 7.0 cm and can be distinguished from it congeners in that the distal half of dorsal caudal fin lobe and the edge of the ventral lobe is pigmented.

E. benjamini is an invertivore that feeds on aquatic and terrestrial invertebrates (primarily insects), zooplankton (including cladocerans, copepods, and rotiferans), and both aquatic and terrestrial vegetation. A single fish could ingest as many as 1700 planktonic crustaceans in a single night, when this species feeds near the water surface.
