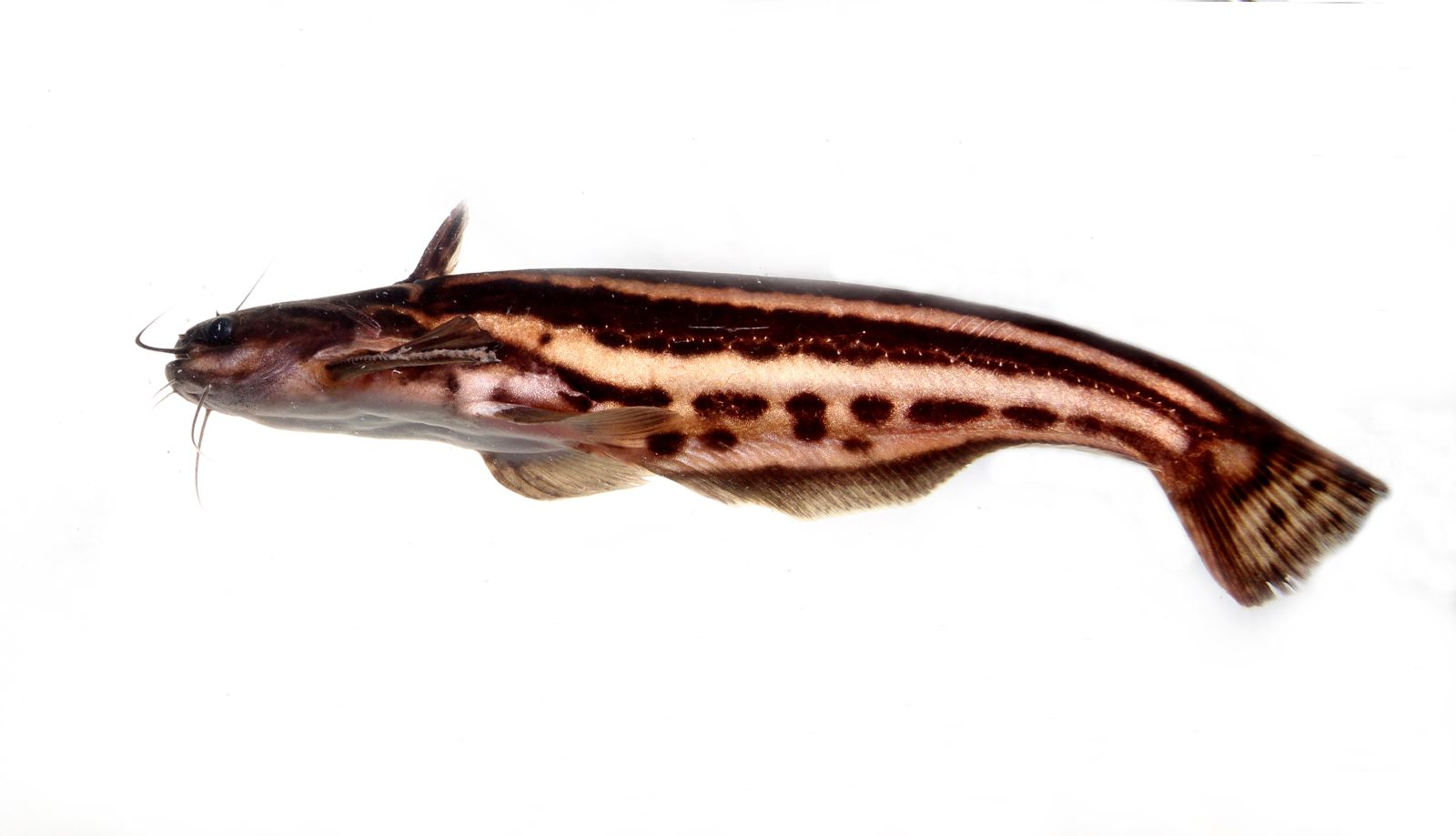

Scientific classification
- Domain: Eukaryota
- Kingdom: Animalia
- Phylum: Chordata
- Class: Actinopterygii
- Order: Siluriformes
- Family: Auchenipteridae
- Genus: Trachelyopterichthys
- Species: T. taeniatus

Binomial name
- Trachelyopterichthys taeniatus (Kner, 1858)

Synonyms
- Trachelyopterus taeniatus Kner, 1858

= Trachelyopterichthys taeniatus =

Species of fish

Trachelyopterichthys taeniatus, the striped woodcat, is a species of driftwood catfish found in the upper Amazon River basin in the countries of Brazil, Peru and Venezuela. It is also found as an aquarium fish. It reaches a length of 15.0 cm.
