= Glanidium catharinensis =

Conservation status
- Data Deficient (IUCN 3.1)

Scientific classification
- Kingdom: Animalia
- Phylum: Chordata
- Class: Actinopterygii
- Order: Siluriformes
- Family: Auchenipteridae
- Genus: Glanidium
- Species: G. catharinensis

Binomial name
- Glanidium catharinensis P. Miranda-Ribeiro, 1962

Synonyms
- Glanidium catherinensis Miranda Ribeiro, 1962

Species of driftwood catfish

Glanidium catharinensis is a species of driftwood catfish in the family Auchenipteridae. It is found in the Tubarão River basin in Santa Catarina, Brazil.

== Description ==
Glanidium catharinensis reaches a standard length of 15.8 cm (6.2 in).
