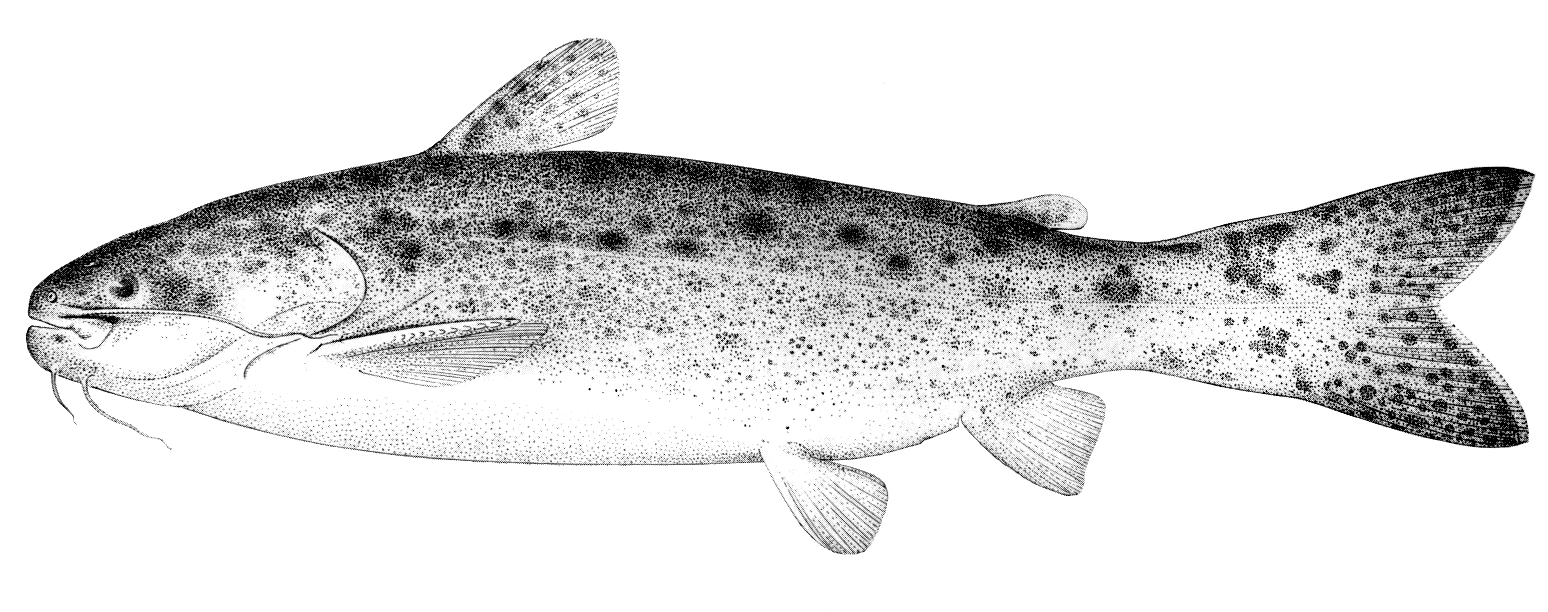

Conservation status
- Least Concern (IUCN 3.1)

Scientific classification
- Kingdom: Animalia
- Phylum: Chordata
- Class: Actinopterygii
- Order: Siluriformes
- Family: Auchenipteridae
- Genus: Glanidium
- Species: G. ribeiroi

Binomial name
- Glanidium ribeiroi Haseman, 1911

Synonyms
- Glanidium riberoi Haseman, 1911

= Glanidium ribeiroi =

Species of driftwood catfish

Glanidium ribeiroi is a species of driftwood catfish in the family Auchenipteridae. It is found in the Iguaçu River basin in South America.

== Description ==
Glanidium ribeiroi reaches a standard length of 22.0 cm (8.7 in).

== Etymology ==
The catfish is named in honor of Brazilian ichthyologist-herpetologist Alípio de Miranda Ribeiro (1874-1939), who was Secretary of the National Museum in Rio de Janeiro.
