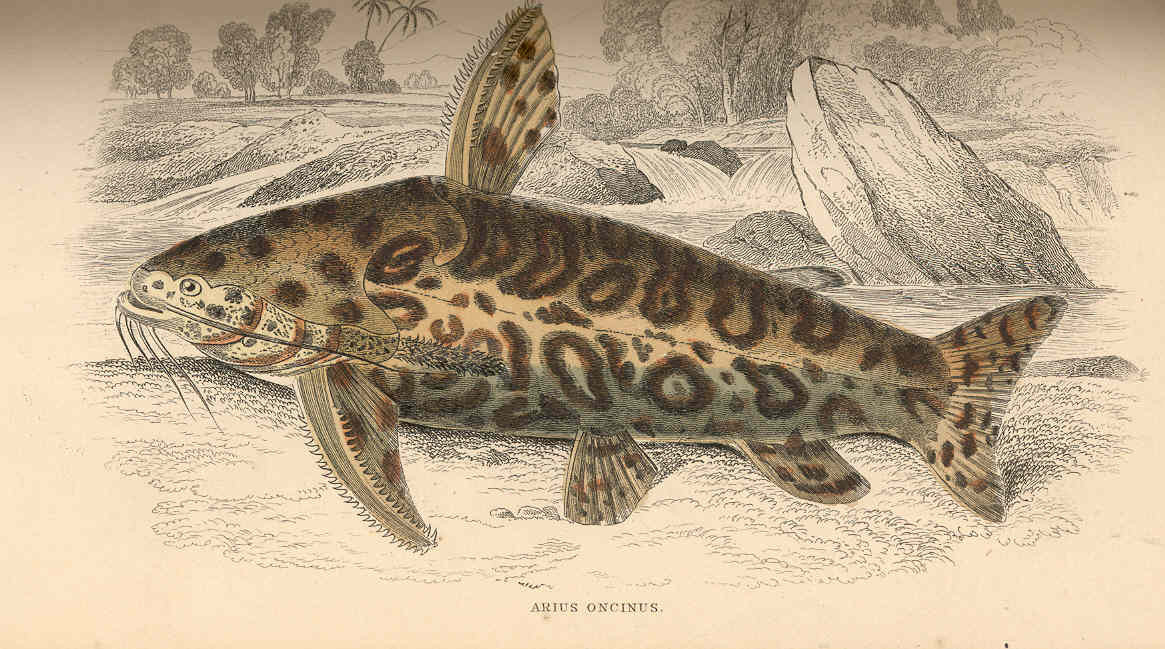

Conservation status
- Least Concern (IUCN 3.1)

Scientific classification
- Kingdom: Animalia
- Phylum: Chordata
- Class: Actinopterygii
- Order: Siluriformes
- Family: Auchenipteridae
- Genus: Liosomadoras
- Species: L. oncinus

Binomial name
- Liosomadoras oncinus (Jardine in Schomburgk, 1841)

Synonyms
- Arius oncinus Jardine, 1841

= Liosomadoras oncinus =

Jaguar catfish

Species of fish

The jaguar catfish (Liosomadorsa oncinus) is a species of driftwood catfish endemic to Brazil where it is found in the Branco River and in the Trombetas River. It is also found in the aquarium trade.
