= Spinipterus acsi =

Scientific classification
- Kingdom: Animalia
- Phylum: Chordata
- Class: Actinopterygii
- Order: Siluriformes
- Family: Auchenipteridae
- Genus: Spinipterus; Akama & Ferraris, 2011
- Species: S. acsi

Binomial name
- Spinipterus acsi Akama & Ferraris, 2011

Species of fish

Spinipterus acsi is a species of driftwood catfish known only from the Amazon River basin in Peru.
