= Entomocorus gameroi =

Scientific classification
- Domain: Eukaryota
- Kingdom: Animalia
- Phylum: Chordata
- Class: Actinopterygii
- Order: Siluriformes
- Family: Auchenipteridae
- Genus: Entomocorus
- Species: E. gameroi

Binomial name
- Entomocorus gameroi Mago-Leccia, 1984

Species of fish

Entomocorus gameroi is a species of driftwood catfish native (possibly endemic) to Venezuela and questionably present in Colombia. It is found in the Apure River basin. It grows to a length of 7.0 cm and can be distinguished from its congeners by an oblique band crossing from the dorsal profile of the caudal peduncle to the middle-upper rays of the caudal fin. E. gameroi is classified as an omnivore with a tendency towards insectivory; it has been found to eat cladocerans, copepods, and water mites, as well as ostracods, insects including coleopterans, dipterans, ephemeropterans, hemipterans, and seeds and other vegetal matter.

During the day, E. gameroi rests motionlessly. This species has been found to hide among the submerged roots of water hyacinth during the day, but may also use alternative sources of shelter such as wood, rocks, and other benthic substrata in hyacinth-free locations.

The reproductive cycle of E. gameroi has been studied, and it is believed that this species is short-lived. Fish of this species reach sexual maturity within a year and perish soon after. Members of a given cohort are never found in the studied lake the next year.
