= Auchenipterichthys coracoideus =

Conservation status
- Least Concern (IUCN 3.1)

Scientific classification
- Kingdom: Animalia
- Phylum: Chordata
- Class: Actinopterygii
- Order: Siluriformes
- Family: Auchenipteridae
- Genus: Auchenipterichthys
- Species: A. coracoideus

Binomial name
- Auchenipterichthys coracoideus (C. H. Eigenmann & W. R. Allen, 1942)

Synonyms
- Trachycorystes coracoideus Eigenmann & Allen. 1942

Species of fish

Auchenipterichthys coracoideus, the leguia, is a species of driftwood catfish endemic to Peru where it is found in the upper Amazon River basin. It grows to a length of 10 cm (3.9 in).

== In the aquarium ==
A. coracoideus appears in the aquarium hobby, named the zamora woodcat or the midnight catfish. These fish usually do not venture out into light and will prefer to spend the day tightly sheltered in small spaces. It is a robust species that is suitable for community aquaria, but can't be trusted with small fish that it may consume.
