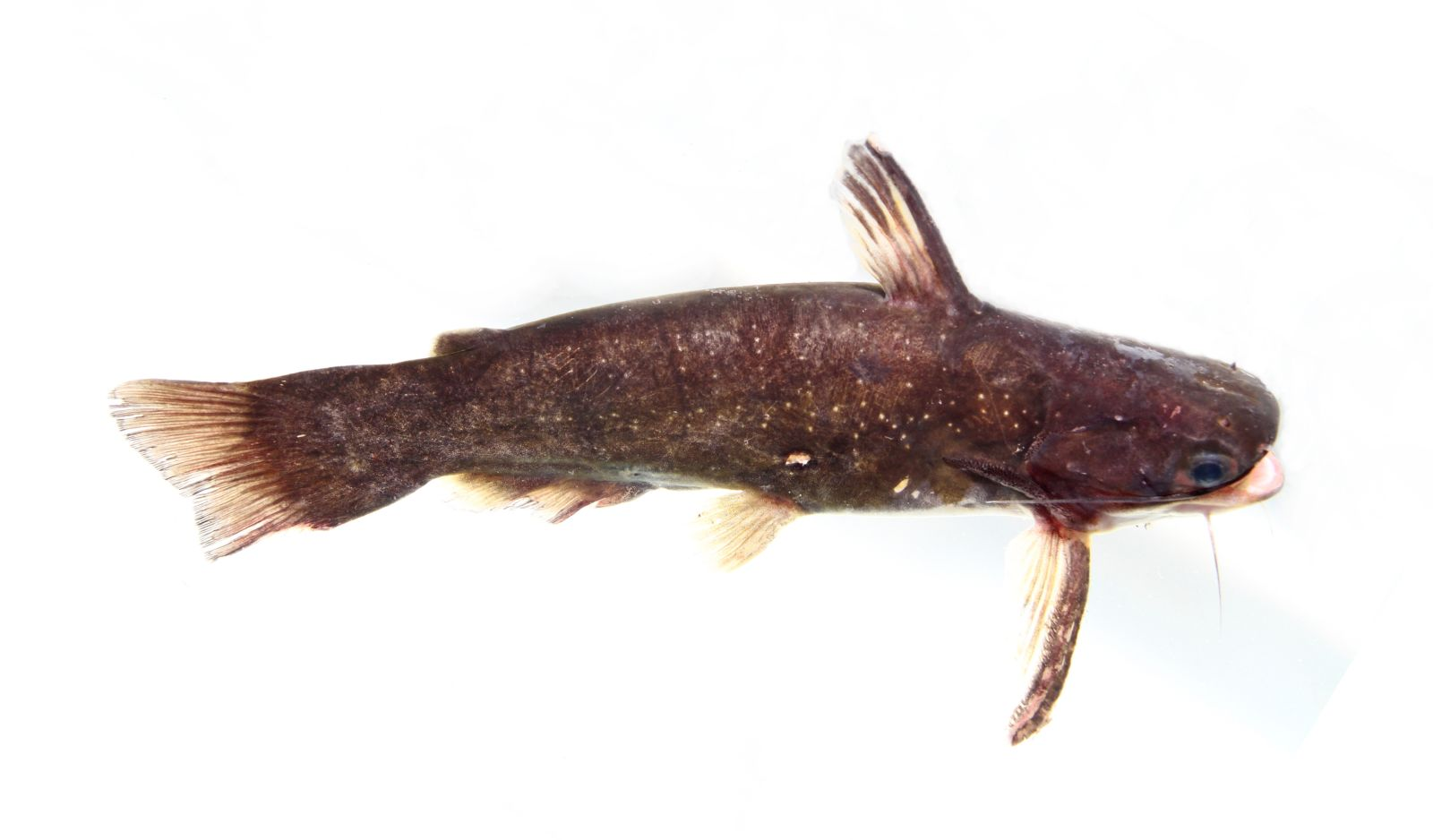
- Auchenipterichthys

Scientific classification
- Kingdom: Animalia
- Phylum: Chordata
- Class: Actinopterygii
- Order: Siluriformes
- Family: Auchenipteridae
- Genus: Auchenipterichthys
- Species: A. thoracatus

Binomial name
- Auchenipterichthys thoracatus (Kner, 1858)

Synonyms
- Auchenipterus thoracatus Kner, 1858; Auchenipterus thoracicus Günther, 1864

= Auchenipterichthys thoracatus =

Species of fish

Auchenipterichthys thoracatus is a species of driftwood catfish endemic to Peru where it is found in the Amazon River basin. It grows to a length of 11.0 cm.
