= Auchenipterichthys punctatus =

Scientific classification
- Kingdom: Animalia
- Phylum: Chordata
- Class: Actinopterygii
- Order: Siluriformes
- Family: Auchenipteridae
- Genus: Auchenipterichthys
- Species: A. punctatus

Binomial name
- Auchenipterichthys punctatus (Valenciennes in Cuvier and Valenciennes, 1840)

Synonyms
- Auchenipterus punctatus Valenciennes, 1840; Auchenipterichthys dantei Soares-Porto, 1994

Species of fish

Auchenipterichthys punctatus is a species of driftwood catfish endemic to Brazil where it is found in the upper Amazon River basin. It grows to a length of 15.1 cm.
