= Tympanopleura rondoni =

Conservation status
- Least Concern (IUCN 3.1)

Scientific classification
- Kingdom: Animalia
- Phylum: Chordata
- Class: Actinopterygii
- Order: Siluriformes
- Family: Auchenipteridae
- Genus: Tympanopleura
- Species: T. rondoni

Binomial name
- Tympanopleura rondoni (A. Miranda-Ribeiro, 1914)

Synonyms
- Ageneiosus rondoni Miranda-Ribeiro, 1914

Species of fish

Tympanopleura rondoni is a species of driftwood catfish of the family Auchenipteridae. It can be found on the Amazon basin.
