= Tympanopleura brevis =

Conservation status
- Least Concern (IUCN 3.1)

Scientific classification
- Kingdom: Animalia
- Phylum: Chordata
- Class: Actinopterygii
- Order: Siluriformes
- Family: Auchenipteridae
- Genus: Tympanopleura
- Species: T. brevis

Binomial name
- Tympanopleura brevis (Steindachner, 1881)

Synonyms
- Ageneiosus brevis Steindachner, 1881

Species of fish

Tympanopleura brevis is a species of driftwood catfish of the family Auchenipteridae. It can be found on the Amazon basin.
