= Liosomadoras morrowi =

Scientific classification
- Kingdom: Animalia
- Phylum: Chordata
- Class: Actinopterygii
- Order: Siluriformes
- Family: Auchenipteridae
- Genus: Liosomadoras
- Species: L. morrowi

Binomial name
- Liosomadoras morrowi Fowler, 1940

Species of fish

Liosomadoras morrowi is a species of driftwood catfish endemic to Peru where it is found in the Ucayali River.
