= Ageneiosus magoi =

Conservation status
- Least Concern (IUCN 3.1)

Scientific classification
- Kingdom: Animalia
- Phylum: Chordata
- Class: Actinopterygii
- Order: Siluriformes
- Family: Auchenipteridae
- Genus: Ageneiosus
- Species: A. magoi

Binomial name
- Ageneiosus magoi Castiilo & Brull, 1989

Species of fish

Ageneiosus magoi is a species of driftwood catfish of the family Auchenipteridae. It occurs only in the Orinoco Basin.

== Bibliography ==
- Eschmeyer, William N., ed. 1998. Catalog of Fishes. Special Publication of the Center for Biodiversity Research and Information, num. 1, vol. 1–3. California Academy of Sciences. San Francisco, California, United States. 2905. ISBN 0-940228-47-5.
