= Spinipterus moijiri =

Scientific classification
- Kingdom: Animalia
- Phylum: Chordata
- Class: Actinopterygii
- Order: Siluriformes
- Family: Auchenipteridae
- Genus: Spinipterus
- Species: S. moijiri

Binomial name
- Spinipterus moijiri Rocha, Rossoni, Akama & Zuanon, 2019

Species of fish

Spinipterus moijiri (moijiri Paumari) is a species of driftwood catfish found in the Juruá River, Brazil and Nanay River in Peru, on an expedition in around 2012. At 10 cm long the catfish is roughly four times the size of the other only known member of the genus.

Specimens spend the day in a tight space in rocks and wood, emerging at night to feed. The fish is about 10 cm long, thumb-shaped and has skin patterned with jaguar like rosettes. It has a stumpy face similar to a salamander, prickles on its head. The dorsal and two front fins have saw-like serrations.
