= Glanidium botocudo =

Conservation status
- Data Deficient (IUCN 3.1)

Scientific classification
- Kingdom: Animalia
- Phylum: Chordata
- Class: Actinopterygii
- Order: Siluriformes
- Family: Auchenipteridae
- Genus: Glanidium
- Species: G. botocudo

Binomial name
- Glanidium botocudo Sarmento-Soares & Martins-Pinheiro, 2013

Species of driftwood catfish

Glanidium botocudo is a species of driftwood catfish in the family Auchenipteridae. It is found in coastal rivers systems, such as the Rio Doce and the Rio Mucuri in Brazil.

== Description ==
Glanidium botocudo reaches a standard length of 9.6 cm (3.8 in).
