= Ageneiosus pardalis =

Conservation status
- Least Concern (IUCN 3.1)

Scientific classification
- Kingdom: Animalia
- Phylum: Chordata
- Class: Actinopterygii
- Order: Siluriformes
- Family: Auchenipteridae
- Genus: Ageneiosus
- Species: A. pardalis

Binomial name
- Ageneiosus pardalis (Lütken, 1874)

Synonyms
- Ageneiosus caucanus Steindachner, 1880; Ageneiosus virgo Posada, 1909; Ageneiosus freiei Schultz, 1944

Species of fish

Ageneiosus pardalis is a species of driftwood catfish of the family Auchenipteridae. It can be found in the Maracaibo Lake.

== Bibliography ==
- Eschmeyer, William N., ed. 1998. Catalog of Fishes. Special Publication of the Center for Biodiversity Research and Information, num. 1, vol. 1–3. California Academy of Sciences. San Francisco, California, United States. 2905. ISBN 0-940228-47-5.
