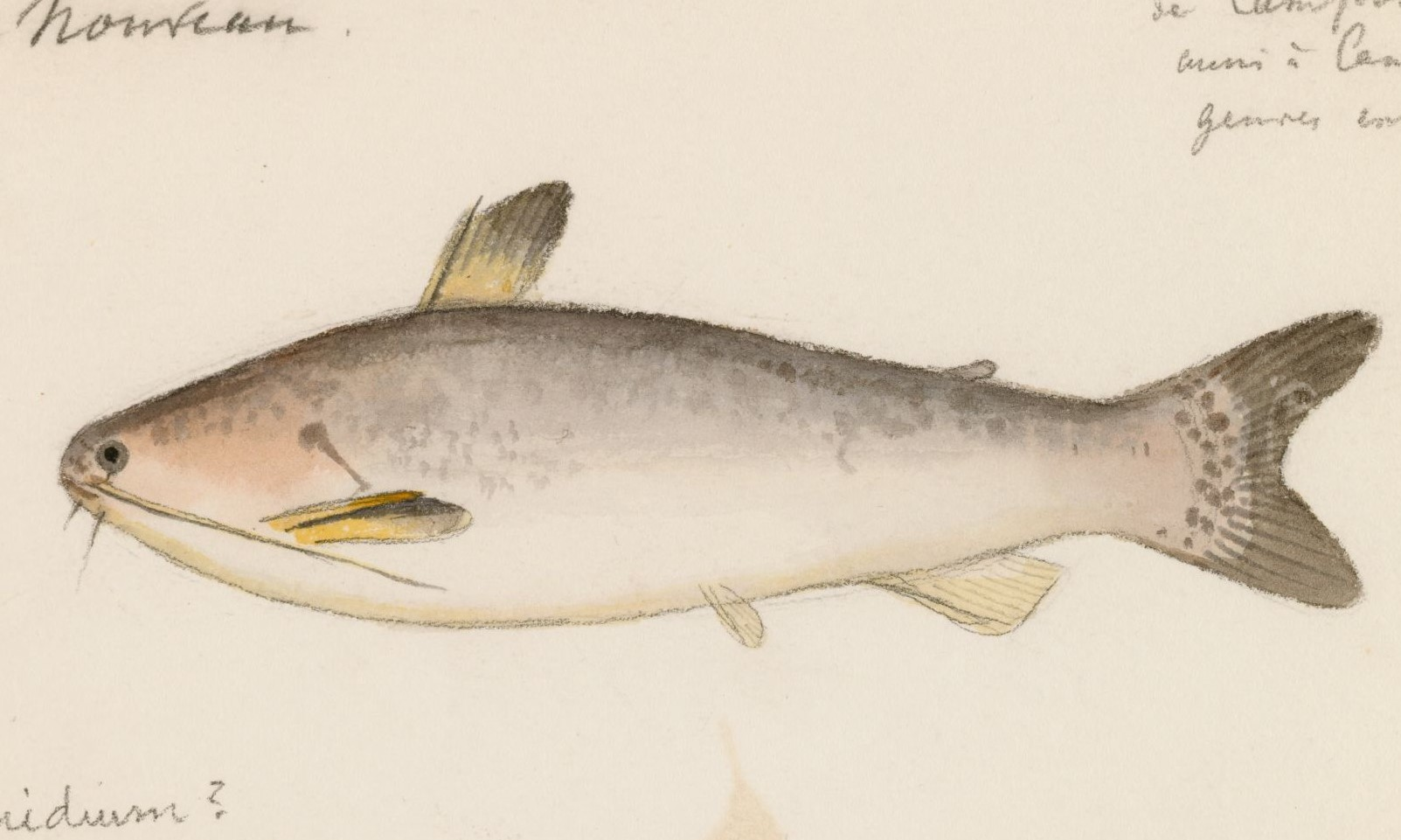

Conservation status
- Least Concern (IUCN 3.1)

Scientific classification
- Kingdom: Animalia
- Phylum: Chordata
- Class: Actinopterygii
- Order: Siluriformes
- Family: Auchenipteridae
- Genus: Glanidium
- Species: G. melanopterum

Binomial name
- Glanidium melanopterum A. Miranda-Ribeiro, 1918

= Glanidium melanopterum =

Species of driftwood catfish

Glanidium melanopterum is a species of driftwood catfish in the family Auchenipteridae. It is found in the Piquete of São Paulo, Brazil.

== Description ==
Glanidium melanopterum reaches a standard length of 19.0 cm (7.5 in).
