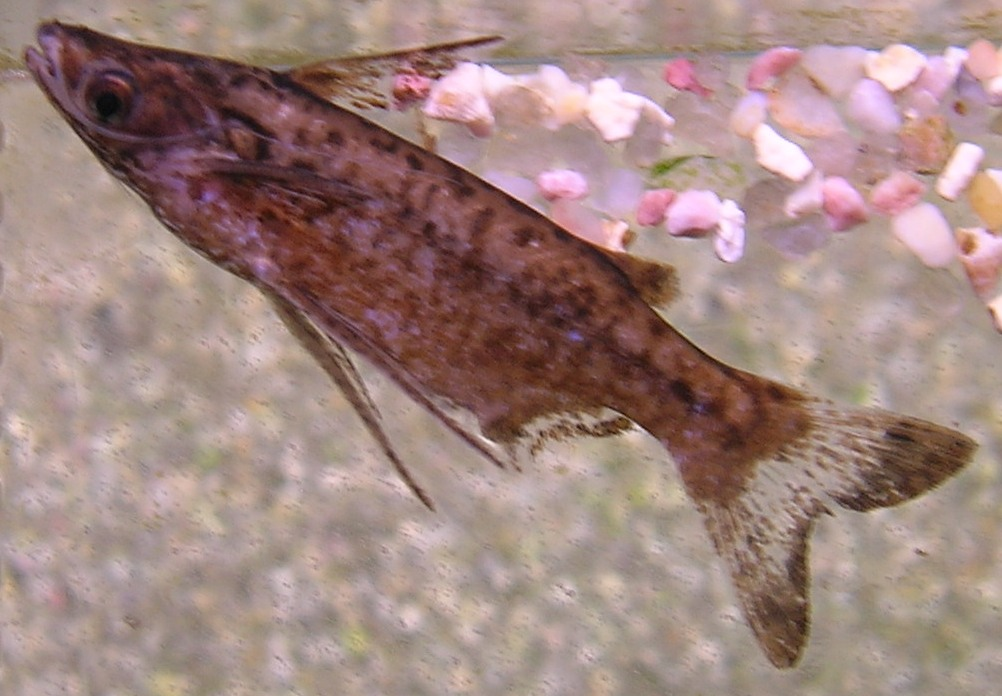

Scientific classification
- Kingdom: Animalia
- Phylum: Chordata
- Class: Actinopterygii
- Order: Siluriformes
- Family: Auchenipteridae
- Subfamily: Auchenipterinae
- Genus: Entomocorus
- Species: E. radiosus

Binomial name
- Entomocorus radiosus R. E. dos Reis & Borges, 2006

= Entomocorus radiosus =

Species of fish

Entomocorus radiosus is a species of driftwood catfish endemic to Brazil where it is found in the Rio Paraguay in the Pantanal region of Mato Grosso. It is the smallest known member of its genus growing to a length of 5.3 cm. It can be distinguished from its congeners because its anal fin base is longer and has more branched anal fin rays. E. radiosus is a zooplanktivore which also eats insects; this species predominantly consumes microcrustaceans (cladocerans, copepods, and ostracods), but also fed on insects (ephemeropterans, coleopterans, and hemipterans).
