= Tympanopleura atronasus =

Conservation status
- Least Concern (IUCN 3.1)

Scientific classification
- Kingdom: Animalia
- Phylum: Chordata
- Class: Actinopterygii
- Order: Siluriformes
- Family: Auchenipteridae
- Genus: Tympanopleura
- Species: T. atronasus

Binomial name
- Tympanopleura atronasus (C. H. Eigenmann & R. S. Eigenmann), 1888

Synonyms
- Ageneiosus atronasus Eigenmann & Eigenmann, 1888

Species of fish

Tympanopleura atronasus is a species of catfish of the family Auchenipteridae. It can be found in the Amazonas River.
