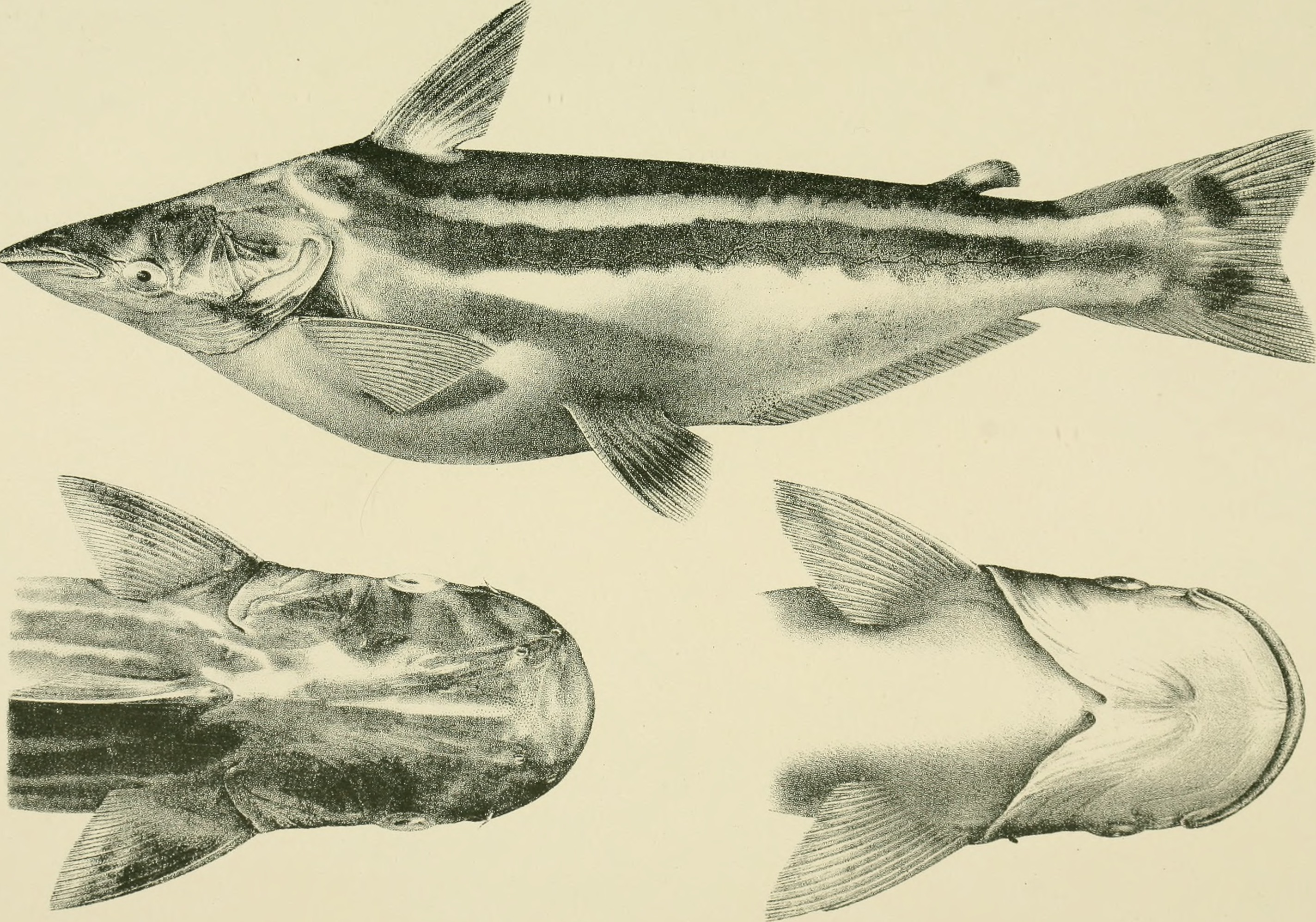

Conservation status
- Least Concern (IUCN 3.1)

Scientific classification
- Kingdom: Animalia
- Phylum: Chordata
- Class: Actinopterygii
- Order: Siluriformes
- Family: Auchenipteridae
- Genus: Ageneiosus
- Species: A. vittatus

Binomial name
- Ageneiosus vittatus Steindachner, 1908

= Ageneiosus vittatus =

Species of fish

Ageneiosus vittatus is a species of driftwood catfish of the family Auchenipteridae. It can be found in the Amazon basin and the Orinoco River.
