= Glanidium albescens =

Conservation status
- Least Concern (IUCN 3.1)

Scientific classification
- Kingdom: Animalia
- Phylum: Chordata
- Class: Actinopterygii
- Order: Siluriformes
- Family: Auchenipteridae
- Genus: Glanidium
- Species: G. albescens

Binomial name
- Glanidium albescens Lütken, 1874

Species of driftwood catfish

Glanidium albescens is a species of driftwood catfish in the family Auchenipteridae. It is found in the Das Velhas River basin in Brazil.

== Description ==
Glanidium albescens reaches a standard length of 12.2 cm (4.8 in).
