= Trachelyichthys =

Scientific classification
- Kingdom: Animalia
- Phylum: Chordata
- Class: Actinopterygii
- Order: Siluriformes
- Family: Auchenipteridae
- Subfamily: Auchenipterinae
- Genus: Trachelyichthys; Mees, 1974

Type species
- Trachelyichthys decaradiatus Mees, 1974

Genus of fishes

Trachelyichthys is a genus of driftwood catfishes found in tropical South America.

== Species ==
There are currently two described species in this genus:

- Trachelyichthys decaradiatus Mees, 1974
- Trachelyichthys exilis D. W. Greenfield & Glodek, 1977
