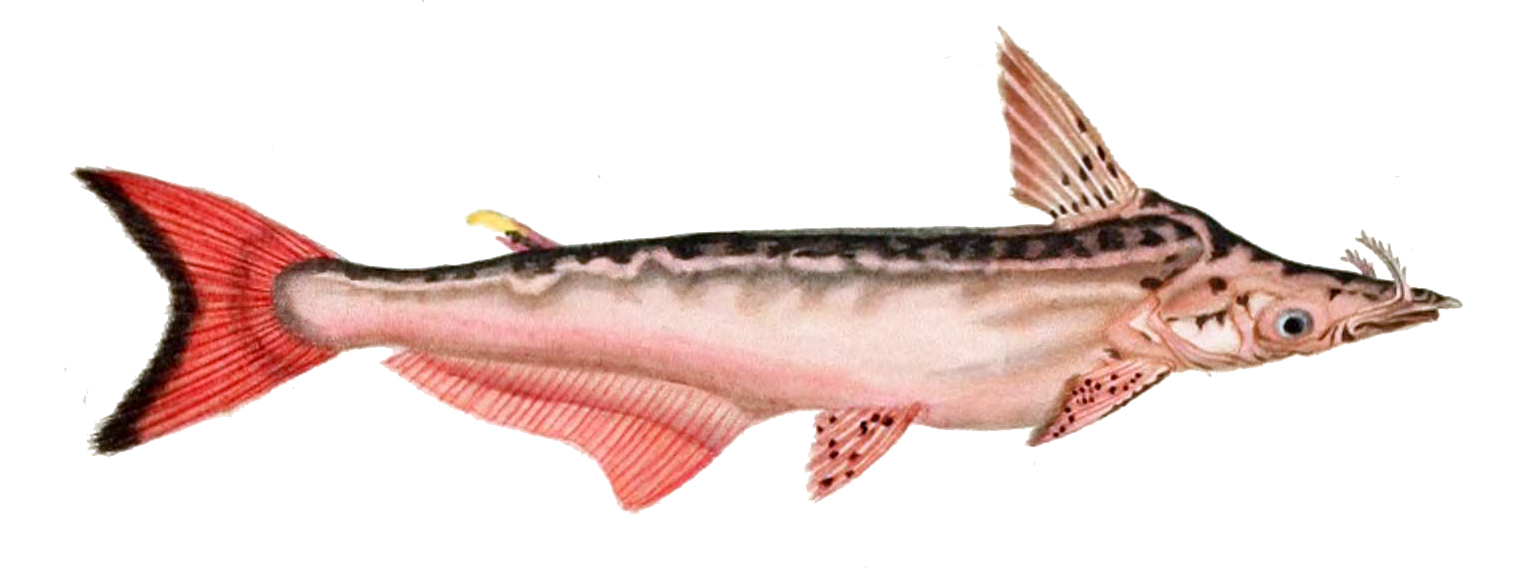

Conservation status
- Least Concern (IUCN 3.1)

Scientific classification
- Kingdom: Animalia
- Phylum: Chordata
- Class: Actinopterygii
- Order: Siluriformes
- Family: Auchenipteridae
- Genus: Ageneiosus
- Species: A. militaris

Binomial name
- Ageneiosus militaris (Valenciennes, 1836)

Synonyms
- Ageneiosus valenciennesi Bleeker, 1864; Silurus imberbis Larrañaga, 1923; Silurus trigintaoctoradiatus Larrañaga, 1923; Ageneiosus uruguayensis Devincenzi, 1933; Ageneiosus marquesi Risso & Risso, 1964

= Ageneiosus militaris =

Species of fish

Ageneiosus militaris is a species of driftwood catfish of the family Auchenipteridae. It can be found in the La Plata River basin in South America.

== Bibliography ==
- Eschmeyer, William N., ed. 1998. Catalog of Fishes. Special Publication of the Center for Biodiversity Research and Information, num. 1, vol. 1–3. California Academy of Sciences. San Francisco, California, United States. 2905. ISBN 0-940228-47-5.
