= Trachelyopterus cratensis =

Conservation status
- Data Deficient (IUCN 3.1)

Scientific classification
- Kingdom: Animalia
- Phylum: Chordata
- Class: Actinopterygii
- Order: Siluriformes
- Family: Auchenipteridae
- Genus: Trachelyopterus
- Species: T. cratensis

Binomial name
- Trachelyopterus cratensis (A. Miranda-Ribeiro, 1937)

Synonyms
- Trachycorystes cratensis Miranda Ribeiro, 1937

Species of fish

Trachelyopterus cratensis is a species of driftwood catfish endemic to Brazil where it is found in the state of Ceará in the Granjeiro River basin. It grows to a length of 6.1 cm (2.4 in).
