= Epapterus blohmi =

Epapaterus blohmi

Scientific classification
- Kingdom: Animalia
- Phylum: Chordata
- Class: Actinopterygii
- Order: Siluriformes
- Family: Auchenipteridae
- Genus: Epapterus
- Species: E. blohmi

Binomial name
- Epapterus blohmi Vari, S. L. Jewett, Taphorn & C. R. Gilbert, 1984

Species of fish

Epapterus blohmi is a species of driftwood catfish distributed in the Orinoco River basin and Tuy River of the Caribbean coast of Venezuela. E. blohmi grows to 8.5 cm (3.3 in) SL. It is found in a variety of habitats where there is poor visibility and the water is still or slow-flowing. It feeds on filamentous algae and other plant material during the dry season.
