= Auchenipterichthys longimanus =

Scientific classification
- Domain: Eukaryota
- Kingdom: Animalia
- Phylum: Chordata
- Class: Actinopterygii
- Order: Siluriformes
- Family: Auchenipteridae
- Genus: Auchenipterichthys
- Species: A. longimanus

Binomial name
- Auchenipterichthys longimanus (Günther, 1864)

Synonyms
- Auchenipterus longimanus Günther, 1864

Species of fish

Auchenipterichthys longimanus is a species of driftwood catfish endemic to Brazil where it is found in the Amazon River basin. It grows to a length of 15 cm.
