= Glanidium cesarpintoi =

Conservation status
- Least Concern (IUCN 3.1)

Scientific classification
- Kingdom: Animalia
- Phylum: Chordata
- Class: Actinopterygii
- Order: Siluriformes
- Family: Auchenipteridae
- Genus: Glanidium
- Species: G. cesarpintoi

Binomial name
- Glanidium cesarpintoi R. Ihering, 1928

Species of driftwood catfish

Glanidium cesarpintoi is a species of driftwood catfish in the family Auchenipteridae. It is found in the Mogi-guassú River basin of São Paulo, Brazil.

== Description ==
Glanidium cesarpintoi reaches a standard length of 9.6 cm (3.8 in).

== Etymology ==
The catfish is named in honor of colleague Cesar Pinto (1896-1964), a helminthologist, in gratitude for his assistance and his hospitality during Ihering's studies in São Paulo, Brazil.
