= Tocantinsia piresi =

Conservation status
- Near Threatened (IUCN 3.1)

Scientific classification
- Kingdom: Animalia
- Phylum: Chordata
- Class: Actinopterygii
- Order: Siluriformes
- Family: Auchenipteridae
- Genus: Tocantinsia; Mees, 1974
- Species: T. piresi

Binomial name
- Tocantinsia piresi (A. Miranda-Ribeiro, 1920)

Synonyms
- Glanidium piresi A. Miranda Ribeiro, 1920; Tocantinsia depressa Mees, 1974

Species of fish

Tocantinsia piresi is a species of driftwood catfish (order Siluriformes), and is the only species of the genus Tocantinsia. T. piresi grows to a length of about 10 centimetres (3.9 in) SL and originates from the upper Tocantins River basin. During the rainy season, T. piresi is an omnivore that feeds mainly on allochthonous food items such as fruits, seeds, flowers, and animals from the igapo, permanently flooded land where roots of vegetation are always submerged. Reproduction occurs between November and January, when the water level of the river is rising.

== Etymology ==
The fish is named in honor of Miranda Ribeiro’s good friend Antenor Pires, a taxidermist on the expedition during which the holotype was collected.
