= Trachelyichthys exilis =

Scientific classification
- Kingdom: Animalia
- Phylum: Chordata
- Class: Actinopterygii
- Order: Siluriformes
- Family: Auchenipteridae
- Genus: Trachelyichthys
- Species: T. exilis

Binomial name
- Trachelyichthys exilis D. W. Greenfield & Glodek, 1977

Species of fish

Trachelyichthys exilis is a species of driftwood catfish endemic to Peru where it is found in the Nanay River basin. It grows to a length of 8.0 cm.
