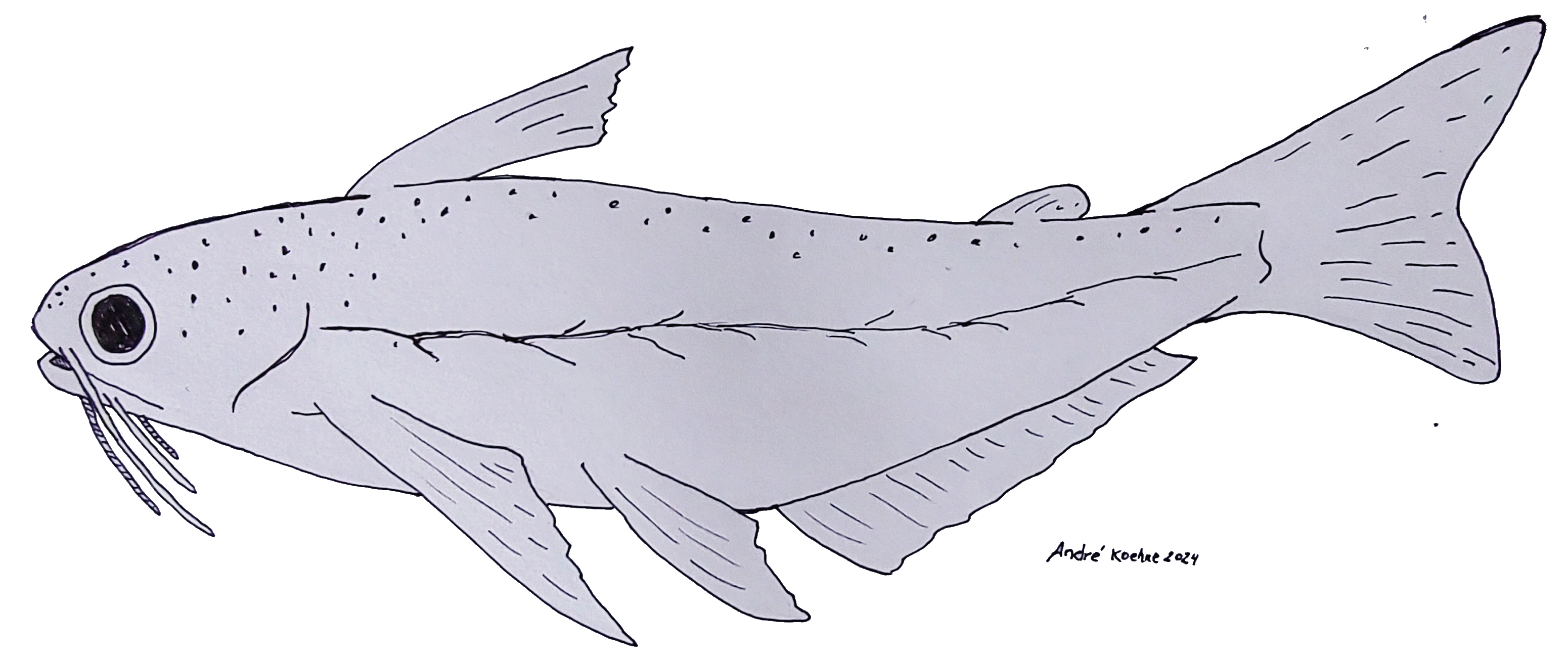

Conservation status
- Data Deficient (IUCN 3.1)

Scientific classification
- Kingdom: Animalia
- Phylum: Chordata
- Class: Actinopterygii
- Order: Siluriformes
- Family: Auchenipteridae
- Genus: Pseudotatia; Mees, 1974
- Species: P. parva

Binomial name
- Pseudotatia parva Mees, 1974

= Pseudotatia parva =

Species of fish

Pseudotatia parva is a species of catfish (order Siluriformes) of the family Auchenipteridae. It is the only species of the genus Pseudotatia. This species originates from the São Francisco River basin of Brazil.
