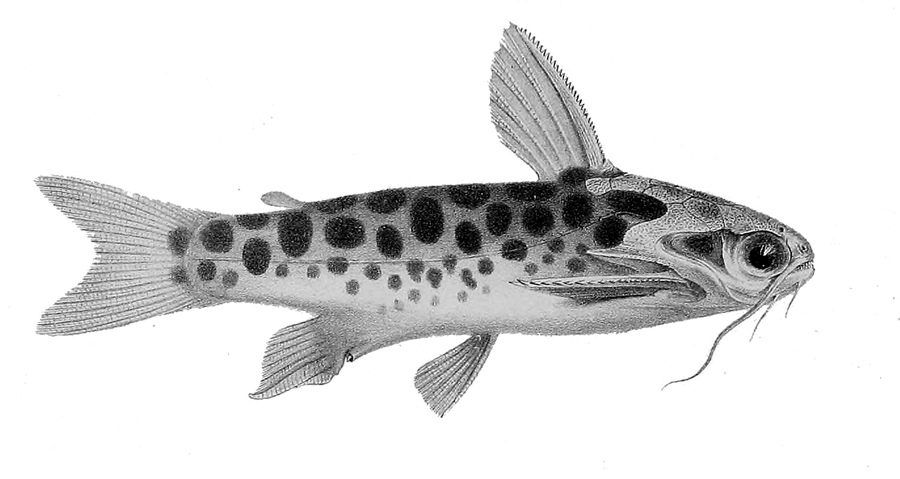
- Tatia intermedia

Scientific classification
- Kingdom: Animalia
- Phylum: Chordata
- Class: Actinopterygii
- Order: Siluriformes
- Family: Auchenipteridae
- Subfamily: Centromochlinae
- Genus: Tatia; A. Miranda-Ribeiro, 1911

Type species
- Centromochlus intermedius Steindachner, 1877

= Tatia =

Genus of fishes

Tatia is a genus of small South American catfishes belonging to Auchenipteridae, the driftwood catfish family.

== Species ==
These are the currently recognized species in this genus:

- Tatia akroa Souza, Sarmento-Soares, Canto & Ribeiro, 2020
- Tatia aulopygia (Kner, 1858)
- Tatia bockmanni (Sarmento-Soares & Buckup, 2005)
- Tatia boemia W. R. Koch & R. E. dos Reis, 1996
- Tatia britskii (Sarmento-Soares & Birindelli, 2015)
- Tatia brunnea Mees, 1974
- Tatia caudosignata DoNascimiento, Albornoz-Garzón & García-Melo, 2019
- Tatia caxiuanesis Sarmento-Soares & Martins-Pinheiro, 2008
- Tatia concolor Mees, 1974
- Tatia creutzbergi (Boeseman, 1953)
- Tatia dunni (Fowler, 1945)
- Tatia galaxias Mees, 1974
- Tatia gyrinus (C. H. Eigenmann & W. R. Allen, 1942)
- Tatia intermedia (Steindachner, 1877)
- Tatia jaracatia Pavanelli & Bifi, 2009
- Tatia luisae Ribeiro, Silva-Oliveira, da Silva & Canto, 2022
- Tatia marthae Vari & Ferraris, 2013
- Tatia meesi Sarmento-Soares & Martins-Pinheiro, 2008
- Tatia neivai R. Ihering (pt), 1930
- Tatia nigra Sarmento-Soares & Martins-Pinheiro, 2008
- Tatia punctata Mees, 1974
- Tatia reticulata Mees, 1974
- Tatia strigata Soares-Porto, 1995
