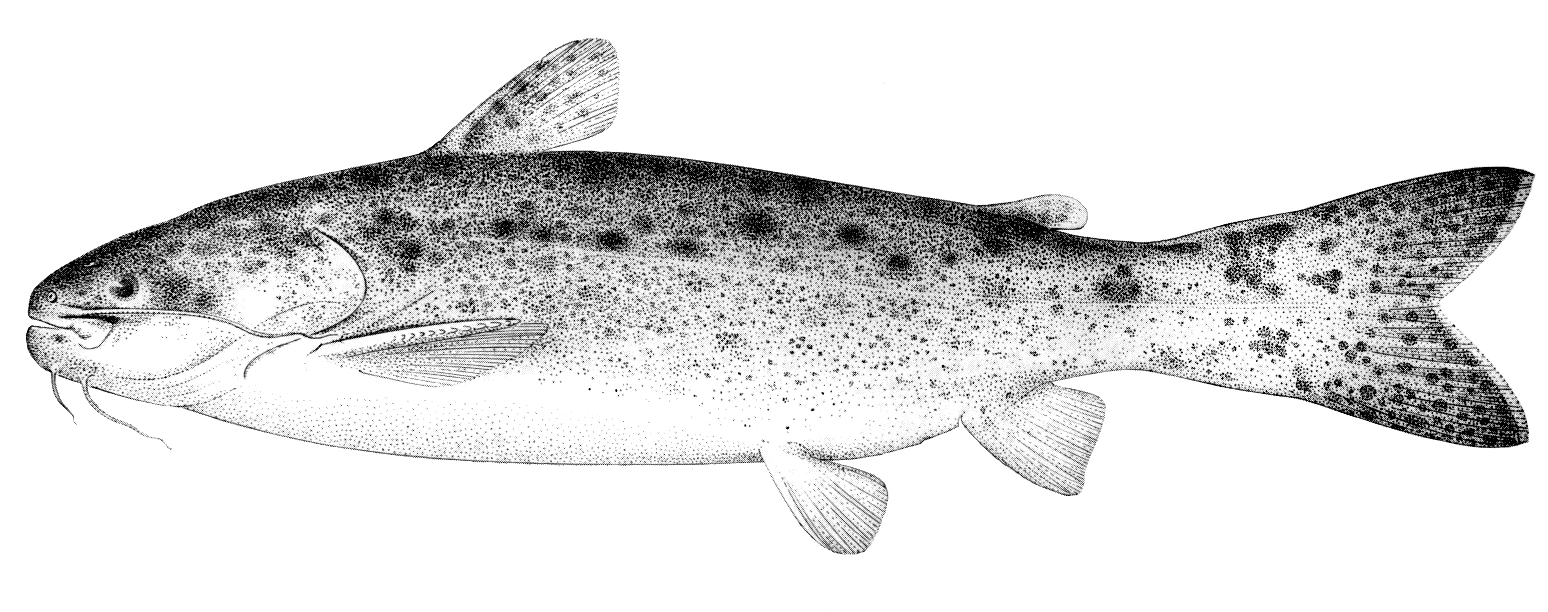
- Glanidium ribeiroi

Scientific classification
- Kingdom: Animalia
- Phylum: Chordata
- Class: Actinopterygii
- Order: Siluriformes
- Family: Auchenipteridae
- Subfamily: Centromochlinae
- Genus: Glanidium; Lütken, 1874

Type species
- Glanidium albescens Lütken, 1874

= Glanidium =

Genus of fishes

Glanidium is a genus of driftwood catfishes found in South America.

== Species ==
There are currently 6 recognized species in this genus:

- Glanidium albescens Lütken, 1874
- Glanidium botocudo Sarmento-Soares & Martins-Pinheiro, 2013
- Glanidium catharinensis P. Miranda-Ribeiro, 1962
- Glanidium cesarpintoi R. Ihering (pt), 1928
- Glanidium melanopterum A. Miranda-Ribeiro, 1918
- Glanidium ribeiroi Haseman, 1911
