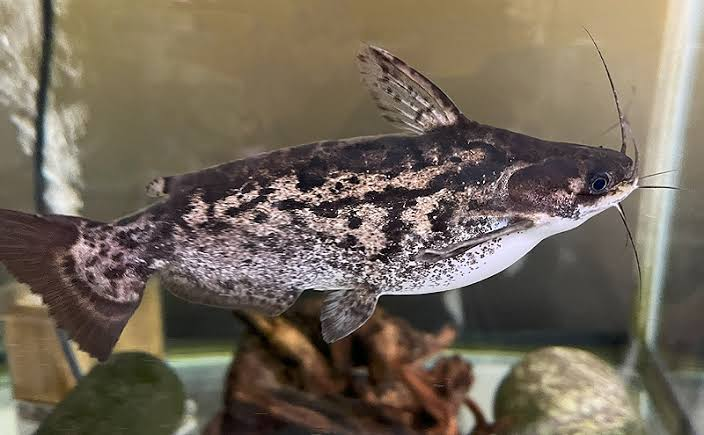

Conservation status
- Least Concern (IUCN 3.1)

Scientific classification
- Kingdom: Animalia
- Phylum: Chordata
- Class: Actinopterygii
- Order: Siluriformes
- Family: Auchenipteridae
- Genus: Trachelyopterus
- Species: T. fisheri

Binomial name
- Trachelyopterus fisheri Eigenmann, 1916

= Trachelyopterus fisheri =

Species of fish

Trachelyopterus fisheri is a freshwater demersal fish native to the Sucio River in Colombia. Synonyms are Parauchenipterus fisheri and Trachycorystes fisheri. Common names are Driftwood catfish or fisher wood catfish.

It is the most slender of all of the Trachelyopterus species. Another feature that helps identity it is the terminal mouth, other Trachelyopterus species have a slightly high-level mouth.

The species is found in the tropical aquarium fish trade, though is not popular. It is listed in the "least concern" category of the IUCN Red List.
