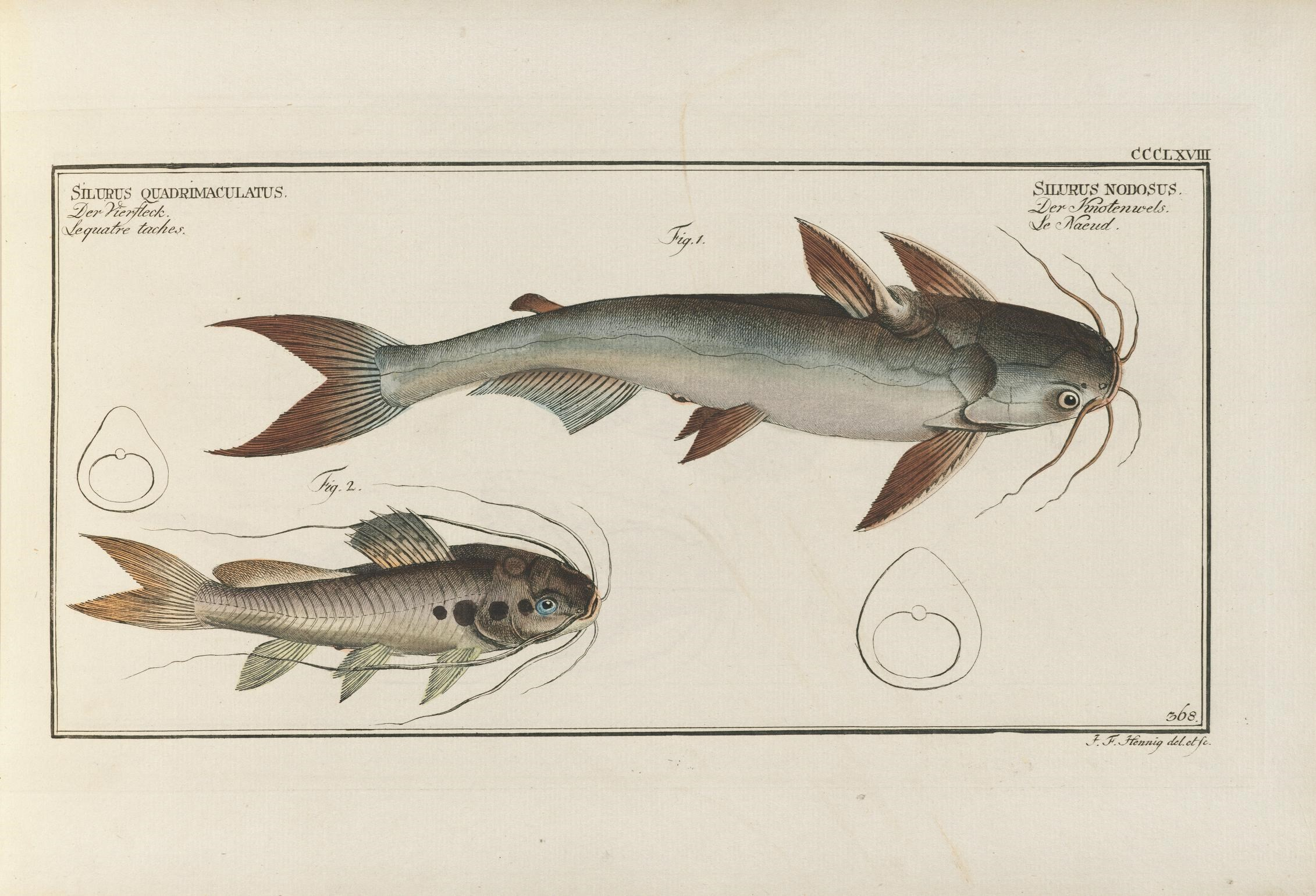
- Pseudauchenipterus nodosus above

Scientific classification
- Domain: Eukaryota
- Kingdom: Animalia
- Phylum: Chordata
- Class: Actinopterygii
- Order: Siluriformes
- Family: Auchenipteridae
- Subfamily: Auchenipterinae
- Genus: Pseudauchenipterus; Bleeker, 1862

Type species
- Silurus nodosus Bloch, 1794

= Pseudauchenipterus =

Genus of fishes

Pseudauchenipterus is a genus of driftwood catfish that occur in tropical South America.

== Species ==
There are currently four described species in this genus:

- Pseudauchenipterus affinis (Steindachner, 1877)
- Pseudauchenipterus flavescens (C. H. Eigenmann & R. S. Eigenmann, 1888)
- Pseudauchenipterus jequitinhonhae (Steindachner, 1877)
- Pseudauchenipterus nodosus (Bloch, 1794) (Cocosoda catfish)
