= Spinipterus =

Scientific classification
- Kingdom: Animalia
- Phylum: Chordata
- Class: Actinopterygii
- Order: Siluriformes
- Family: Auchenipteridae
- Subfamily: Auchenipterinae
- Genus: Spinipterus; Akama & Ferraris, 2011

Type species
- Spinipterus acsi Akama & Ferraris, 2011

Genus of fish

Spinipterus is a genus of catfishes of the family Auchenipteridae.

== Species ==
There are currently two described species in this genus:

- Spinipterus acsi Akama & Ferraris, 2011
- Spinipterus moijiri Rocha, Rossoni, Akama & Zuanon, 2019
