= Gephyromochlus =

Conservation status
- Near Threatened (IUCN 3.1)

Scientific classification
- Kingdom: Animalia
- Phylum: Chordata
- Class: Actinopterygii
- Order: Siluriformes
- Family: Auchenipteridae
- Subfamily: Centromochlinae
- Genus: Gephyromochlus; Hoedeman, 1961
- Species: G. leopardus

Binomial name
- Gephyromochlus leopardus (Hoedeman, 1961)

Synonyms
- Centromochlus (Gephyromochlus) leopardus Hoedeman, 1961; Glanidium leopardum (Hoedeman, 1961); Glanidium leopardus (Hoedeman, 1961)

Species of driftwood catfish

Gephyromochlus is a monospecific genus of driftwood catfish in the family Auchenipteridae. It is found in the coastal rivers of the Guianas in South America. Its only species is Gephyromochlus leopardus.

== Description ==
Gephyromochlus leopardus reaches a standard length of 10.9 cm (4.3 in).
