= Trachycorystes =

Scientific classification
- Kingdom: Animalia
- Phylum: Chordata
- Class: Actinopterygii
- Order: Siluriformes
- Family: Auchenipteridae
- Subfamily: Auchenipterinae
- Genus: Trachycorystes; Bleeker, 1858

Type species
- Auchenipterus trachycorystes Valenciennes, 1840

Genus of fishes

Trachycorystes is a genus of driftwood catfishes found in tropical South America.

== Species ==
There are currently two described species in this genus:

- Trachycorystes menezesi Britski & Akama, 2011
- Trachycorystes trachycorystes (Valenciennes, 1840) (Black catfish)
