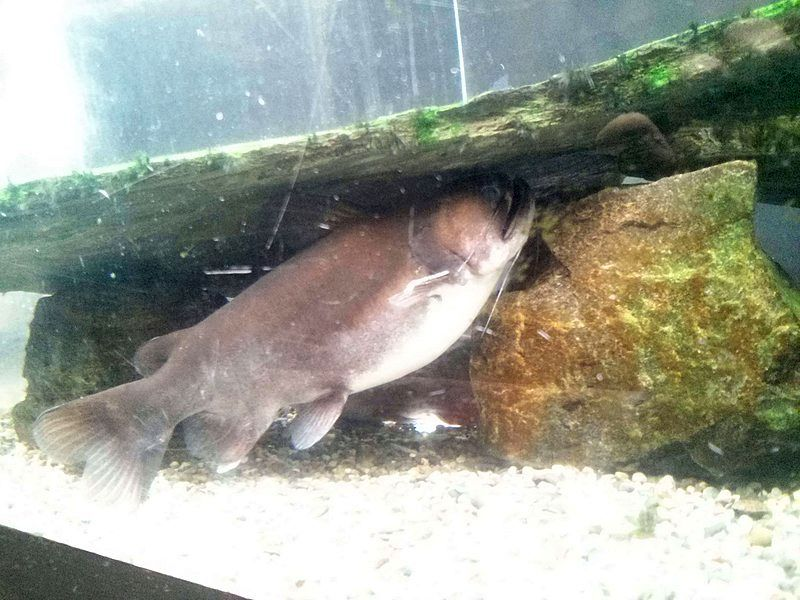

Conservation status
- Least Concern (IUCN 3.1)

Scientific classification
- Kingdom: Animalia
- Phylum: Chordata
- Class: Actinopterygii
- Order: Siluriformes
- Family: Auchenipteridae
- Genus: Asterophysus; Kner, 1858
- Species: A. batrachus

Binomial name
- Asterophysus batrachus Kner, 1858

= Asterophysus =

Species of fish

Asterophysus batrachus, the gulper catfish or ogre catfish, is a species of catfish in the family Auchenipteridae. It is native to the Rio Negro and Orinoco basins in Brazil, Colombia and Venezuela, where it is mostly found in slow-moving waters with many submerged structures.

== Taxonomy ==
The gulper catfish is currently the only recognized species in the genus Asterophysus, but around 2005, a specimen that possibly represents an undescribed species in the genus was collected in Marajó about 1,200 km (750 mi) from the traditionally recognized range of the gulper catfish.

== Description ==
The gulper catfish grows to a standard length of 25 cm (9.8 in) and a total length of 28.5 cm (11.2 in). It has a short, thick-set build and is dark-colored with a whitish belly. Its mouth is quite large, and hence the common name of "gulper catfish".

== Feeding ==
=== Adaptations facilitating feeding ===
The gulper catfish is a strict carnivore and swallows its prey, mostly other fish, whole. This prey can be exceptionally large for its size, sometimes even larger than the gulper catfish itself (although such feeding attempts can be unsuccessful). This is made possible by its ability to greatly expand the oropharyngeal opening, which is in turn facilitated by a variety of specialized features, including the loosely connected dentary symphysis, slight mobility of the premaxillae along the symphysis, and the highly flexible midpoint connection at the ventral side of the pectoral girdle.

=== Feeding techniques ===
Potential prey fish are apparently unable to recognize the gulper catfish as dangerous, as fish will not generally consider other fish of roughly the same size as a major threat; its slow, unobtrusive approach also helps convince potential prey of its harmlessness. A commonly observed attacking approach involves the gulper catfish quickly turning to the side and biting on the head of the targeted fish. Even if the first attempt fails, the gulper catfish will not try to pursue the prey: it will typically still not realize that the gulper catfish represents a threat, and the same approach can be reused. If the gulper catfish succeeds in engulfing the prey (head-first), it stimulates the prey to slide into its oropharyngeal chamber. Escape out of the mouth is generally prevented by the fine, backwards-pointing teeth, and the struggles of the prey cause it to be sent further down the digestive tract, until it eventually ends up folded (with both its head and tail pointing towards the head of the gulper catfish) in the greatly extendable stomach. The fully extended stomach may result in an abnormal appearance of the gulper catfish and impair swimming.

Another attacking approach was observed by a snorkeler in the Atabapo River: in this case, the gulper catfish in question hides in crevices between rocks and darts out to catch passing prey (such as freshwater angelfish). Hence, it may be said that the gulper catfish knows how to set up an ambush attack. It has also been observed to swallow large amounts of water only to expel it later along with the remains of earlier prey.

=== Feeding times ===
In aquariums, gulper catfish will feed during both day and night, but it is suspected that the species is nocturnal and/or crepuscular in the wild, giving it an additional advantage when hunting along river banks for its often sleeping prey.

== Human interactions ==
People in its native range do not typically eat it, as it is considered very ugly. It is, however, sought after in the aquarium trade.
