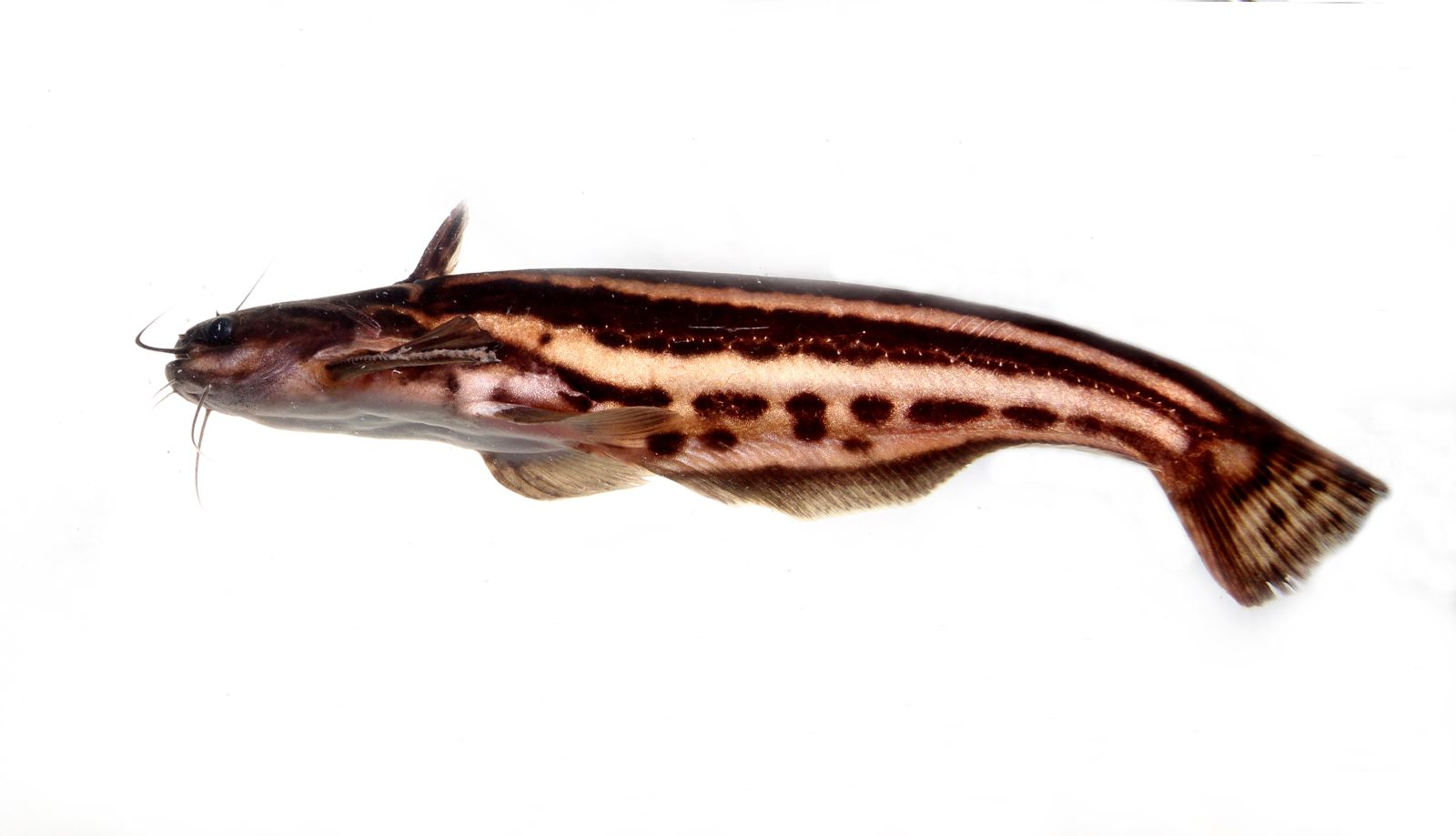
- Trachelyopterichthys taeniatus

Scientific classification
- Kingdom: Animalia
- Phylum: Chordata
- Class: Actinopterygii
- Order: Siluriformes
- Family: Auchenipteridae
- Subfamily: Auchenipterinae
- Genus: Trachelyopterichthys; Bleeker, 1862

Type species
- Trachelyopterus taeniatus Kner, 1857

= Trachelyopterichthys =

Genus of fishes

Trachelyopterichthys is a genus of driftwood catfishes found in tropical South America.

== Species ==
There are currently two described species in this genus:

- Trachelyopterichthys anduzei Ferraris & Fernández, 1987
- Trachelyopterichthys taeniatus (Kner, 1858) (Striped woodcat)
