= Tympanopleura =

Scientific classification
- Kingdom: Animalia
- Phylum: Chordata
- Class: Actinopterygii
- Division: Teleostei
- Order: Siluriformes
- Family: Auchenipteridae
- Subfamily: Auchenipterinae
- Genus: Tympanopleura; C. H. Eigenmann, 1912

Type species
- Tympanopleura piperata C. H. Eigenmann, 1912

Genus of fishes

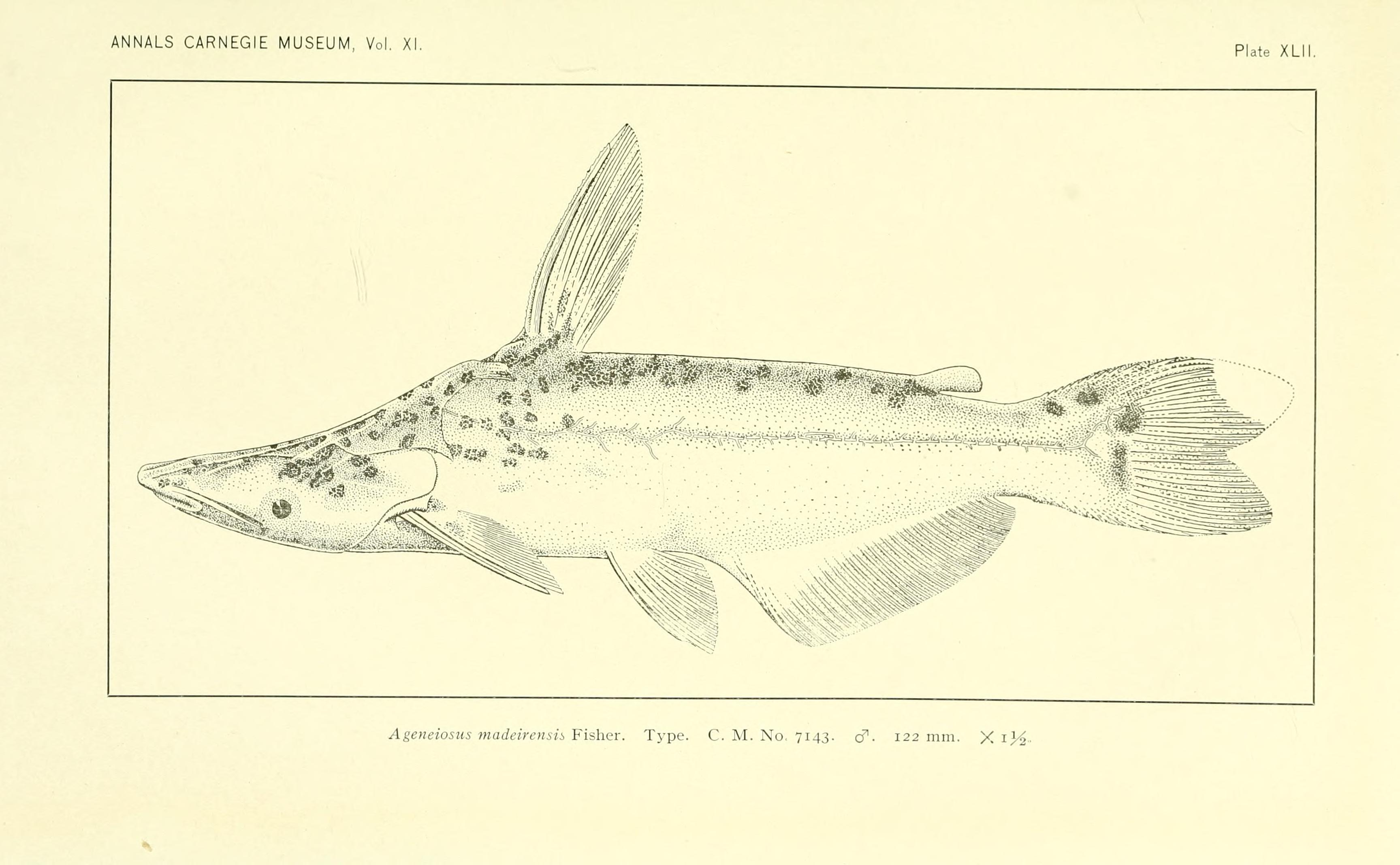

Tympanopleura is a genus of driftwood catfishes found mostly in South America with one species extending into Central America.

== Species ==
There are currently 7 recognized species in this genus:

- Tympanopleura atronasus (C. H. Eigenmann & R. S. Eigenmann, 1888)
- Tympanopleura brevis (Steindacnher, 1881)
- Tympanopleura cryptica S. J. Walsh, F. R. V. Ribeiro & Rapp Py-Daniel, 2015
- Tympanopleura longipinna S. J. Walsh, F. R. V. Ribeiro & Rapp Py-Daniel, 2015
- Tympanopleura personata Ribeiro, Silva-Oliveira, Magalhães, Gama & Rapp Py-Daniel, 2026
- Tympanopleura piperata C. H. Eigenmann, 1912
- Tympanopleura rondoni (A. Miranda-Ribeiro, 1914)
