= Gelanoglanis =

Scientific classification
- Kingdom: Animalia
- Phylum: Chordata
- Class: Actinopterygii
- Order: Siluriformes
- Family: Auchenipteridae
- Subfamily: Centromochlinae
- Genus: Gelanoglanis; J. E. Böhlke, 1980

Type species
- Gelanoglanis stroudi Böhlke 1980

Genus of fishes

Gelanoglanis is a genus of fish in the family Auchenipteridae native to South America.

== Species ==
There are currently 5 recognized species in this genus:

- Gelanoglanis nanonocticolus Soares-Porto, S. J. Walsh, Nico & Netto, 1999
- Gelanoglanis pan Calegari, R. E. dos Reis & Vari, 2014
- Gelanoglanis stroudi J. E. Böhlke, 1980
- Gelanoglanis travieso Rengifo & Lujan, 2008
- Gelanoglanis varii Calegari & R. E. dos Reis, 2016
