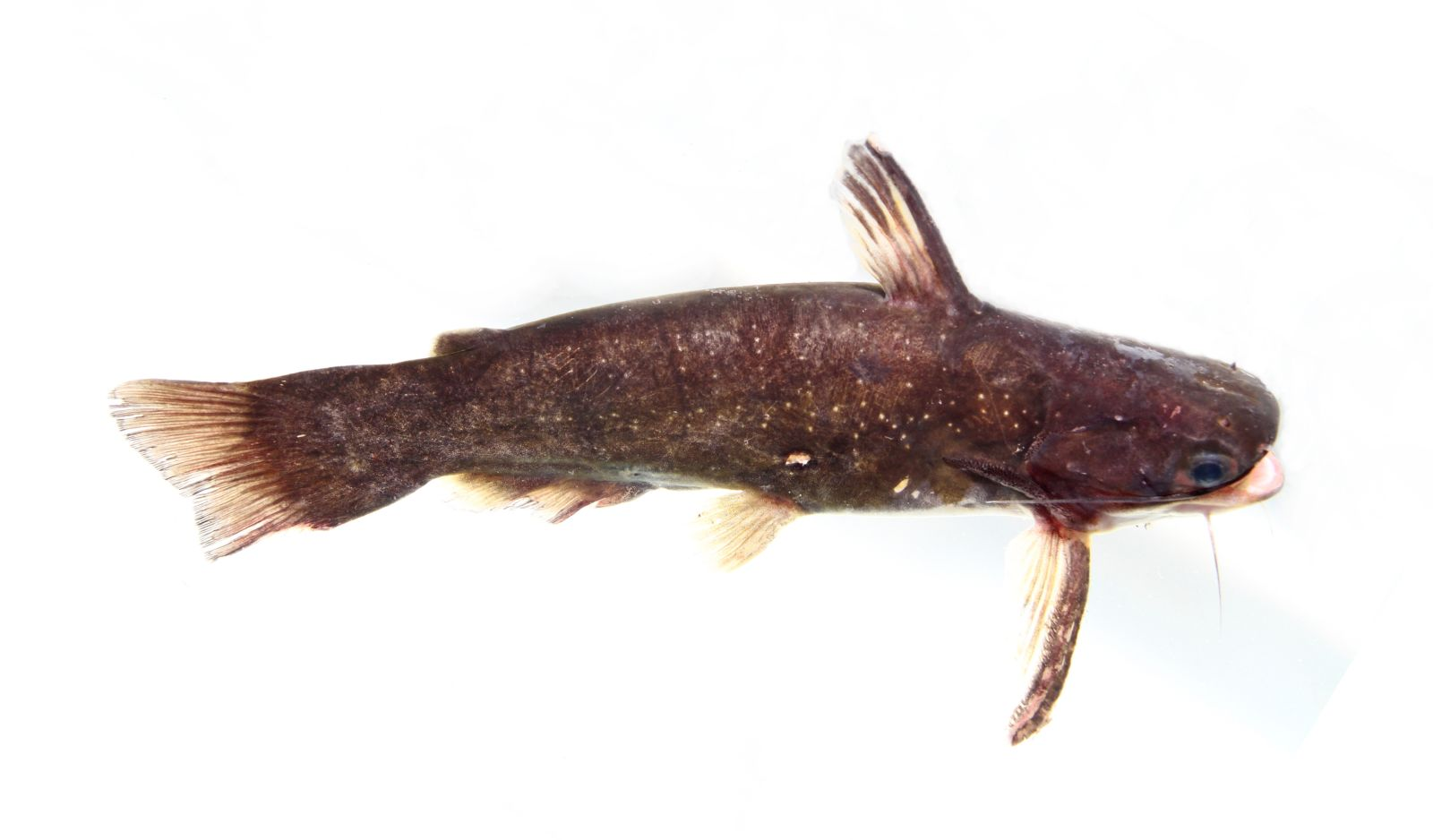
- Auchenipterichthys sp

Scientific classification
- Domain: Eukaryota
- Kingdom: Animalia
- Phylum: Chordata
- Class: Actinopterygii
- Order: Siluriformes
- Family: Auchenipteridae
- Subfamily: Auchenipterinae
- Genus: Auchenipterichthys; Bleeker, 1862

Type species
- Auchenipterus thoracatus Kner, 1858

= Auchenipterichthys =

Genus of fishes

Auchenipterichthys is a genus of driftwood catfishes found in South America.

== Taxonomy ==
Auchenipterichthys was first described by Pieter Bleeker in 1862, who designated A. thoracatus (originally described by Kner in 1857 as Auchenipterus thoracatus) as the type species. There are no derived states that is unique to this genus; however, there is no evidence that has been advanced to indicate that this genus is not monophyletic.

== Species ==
There are currently four described species in this genus:

- Auchenipterichthys coracoideus (C. H. Eigenmann & W. R. Allen, 1942)
- Auchenipterichthys longimanus (Günther, 1864)
- Auchenipterichthys punctatus (Valenciennes, 1840)
- Auchenipterichthys thoracatus (Kner, 1858)

== Description ==
The eyes of these catfish are large and can be seen from both above and below the fish. The anal fin has a long base and at least 18 branched fin rays. The side of the body is decorated with vertical rows of spots above the lateral line. The adipose fin is present.

The lateral line has an irregular zigzag pattern. The head is flattened anteriorly with a terminal mouth. There are three pairs of thread-like barbels, one pair maxillary and two pairs mandibular. The dorsal fin and pectoral fins have large spines; the dorsal fin spine has a lower degree of serration than the pectoral fin spines, which is always serrated strongly on the entire length of both margins.

Based on similarities, the species fall into two groups. One group consists of A. coracoideus and A. thoracatus which have a coracoid covered by a thin layer of integument (allowing the coracoid to be seen from below) and an obliquely truncated caudal fin. The other includes A. longimanus and A. punctatus which has a thick layer of skin covering the coracoid and an emarginate or symmetrical caudal fin. A. coracoideus typically has 25 or fewer branched anal fin rays, while A. thoracatus typically has 26 or more branched anal-fin rays. A. punctatus has a body with variably sized dark spots scattered over the body and the fins, while A. longimanus does not.

Species of Auchenipterichthys are sexually dimorphic. Breeding males of A. coracoideus have an elongated dorsal fin spine. In A. longimanus and A. thoracatus, serrae on the end of the dorsal fin spine are proportionally longer in breeding males than in juveniles and females. Also, females have an enlarged urogenital opening. Males have their urogenital opening located at the end of a tube bound by integument to the anterior margin of the anal fin. The males use their modified anal fin as a means of internal insemination; the female can later lay the eggs in isolation.

== Ecology ==
Auchenipterichthys species are insectivores. A. longimanus has been reported to feed primarily on terrestrial invertebrates. There is also evidence that A. longimanus is involved in seed dispersal. Auchenipterichthys species are also capable of producing sound.
