= Ferrarissoaresia =

Scientific classification
- Kingdom: Animalia
- Phylum: Chordata
- Class: Actinopterygii
- Order: Siluriformes
- Family: Auchenipteridae
- Subfamily: Centromochlinae
- Genus: Ferrarissoaresia; Grant, 2015

Type species
- Centromochlus meridionalis Sarmento-Soares, Cabeceira, Carvalho, Zuanon & Akama, 2013

Genus of fishes

Ferrarissoaresia is a genus of fish in the family Auchenipteridae native to South America.

== Species ==
There are currently 2 recognized species in this genus:

- Ferrarissoaresia ferrarisi (Birindelli, Sarmento-Soares & Lima, 2015)
- Ferrarissoaresia meridionalis (Sarmento-Soares, Cabeceira, Carvalho, Zuanon & Akama, 2013)
