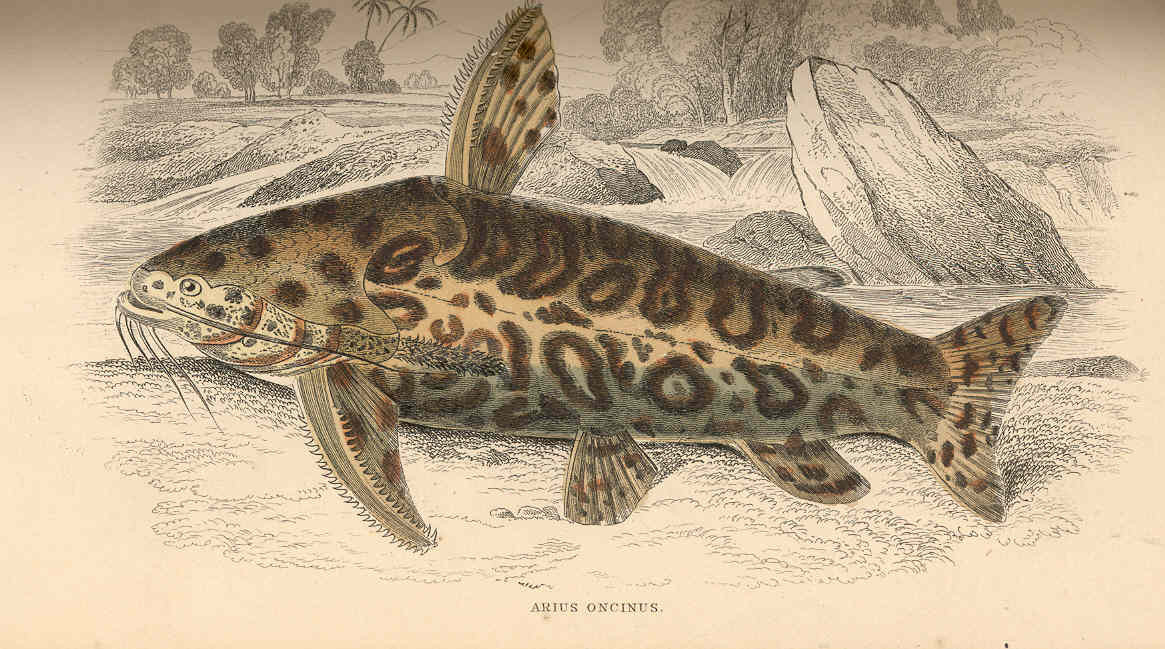
- Liosomadoras oncinus

Scientific classification
- Domain: Eukaryota
- Kingdom: Animalia
- Phylum: Chordata
- Class: Actinopterygii
- Order: Siluriformes
- Family: Auchenipteridae
- Subfamily: Auchenipterinae
- Genus: Liosomadoras; Fowler, 1940

Type species
- Liosomadoras morrowi Fowler, 1940

= Liosomadoras =

Genus of fishes

Liosomadoras is a genus of driftwood catfishes found in tropical South America.

== Species ==
There are currently two described species in this genus:

- Liosomadoras morrowi Fowler, 1940
- Liosomadoras oncinus (Jardine, 1841) (Jaguar catfish)
