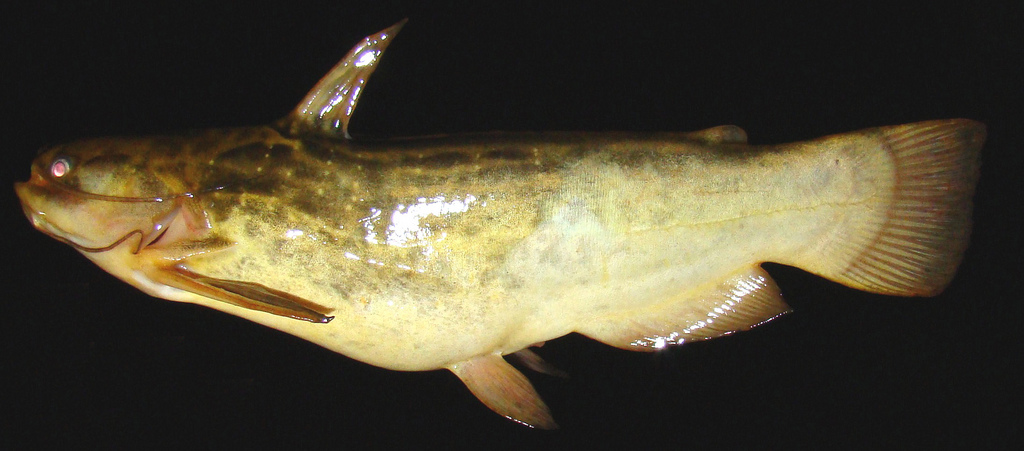

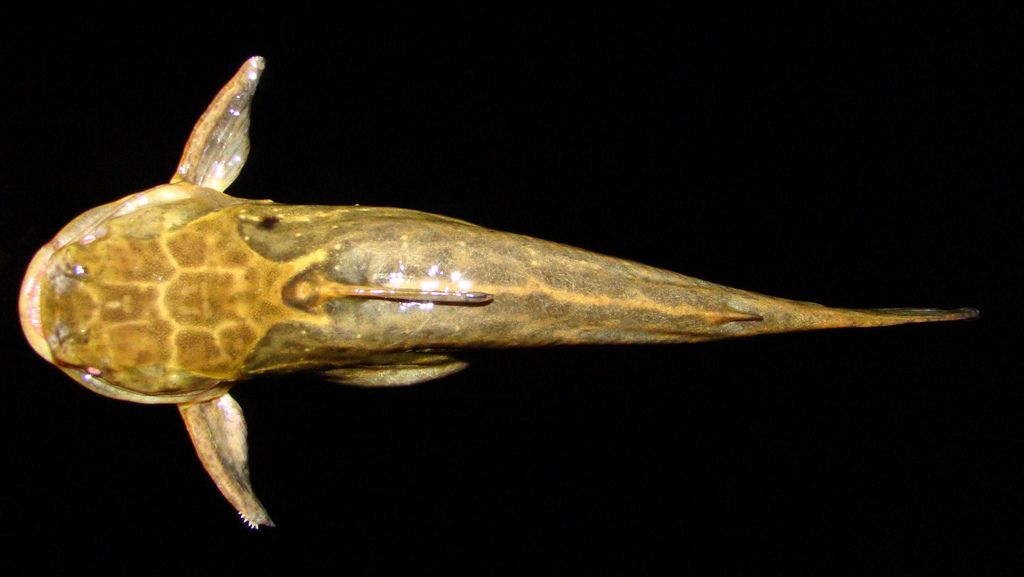

Scientific classification
- Kingdom: Animalia
- Phylum: Chordata
- Class: Actinopterygii
- Order: Siluriformes
- Family: Auchenipteridae
- Genus: Trachelyopterus
- Species: T. lucenai

Binomial name
- Trachelyopterus lucenai Bertoletti (pt), J. F. P. da Silva & E. H. L. Pereira, 1995

= Trachelyopterus lucenai =

Species of fish

Trachelyopterus lucenai is a freshwater member of the family Auchenipteridae that is native to Brazil. It has only been found in the Jacuí River basin in Rio Grande do Sul. Like many Siluriformes it is demersal, which is one of the reasons it has only been recently identified.
