= Tetranematichthys =

Scientific classification
- Kingdom: Animalia
- Phylum: Chordata
- Class: Actinopterygii
- Order: Siluriformes
- Family: Auchenipteridae
- Subfamily: Auchenipterinae
- Genus: Tetranematichthys; Bleeker, 1858

Type species
- Ageneiosus quadrifilis Kner 1858

Genus of fishes

Tetranematichthys is a genus of driftwood catfishes found in tropical South America.

== Species ==
There are currently three described species in this genus.

- Tetranematichthys barthemi L. A. W. Peixoto & Wosiacki, 2010
- Tetranematichthys quadrifilis (Kner, 1858)
- Tetranematichthys wallacei Vari & Ferraris, 2006
