= Pseudepapterus =

Scientific classification
- Kingdom: Animalia
- Phylum: Chordata
- Class: Actinopterygii
- Order: Siluriformes
- Family: Auchenipteridae
- Subfamily: Auchenipterinae
- Genus: Pseudepapterus; Steindachner, 1915

Type species
- Auchenipterus hasemani Steindachner, 1915

Genus of fishes

Pseudepapterus is a genus of driftwood catfishes found in tropical South America.

== Species ==
There are three described species in this genus:

- Pseudepapterus cucuhyensis J. E. Böhlke, 1951
- Pseudepapterus gracilis Ferraris & Vari, 2000
- Pseudepapterus hasemani (Steindachner, 1915)
