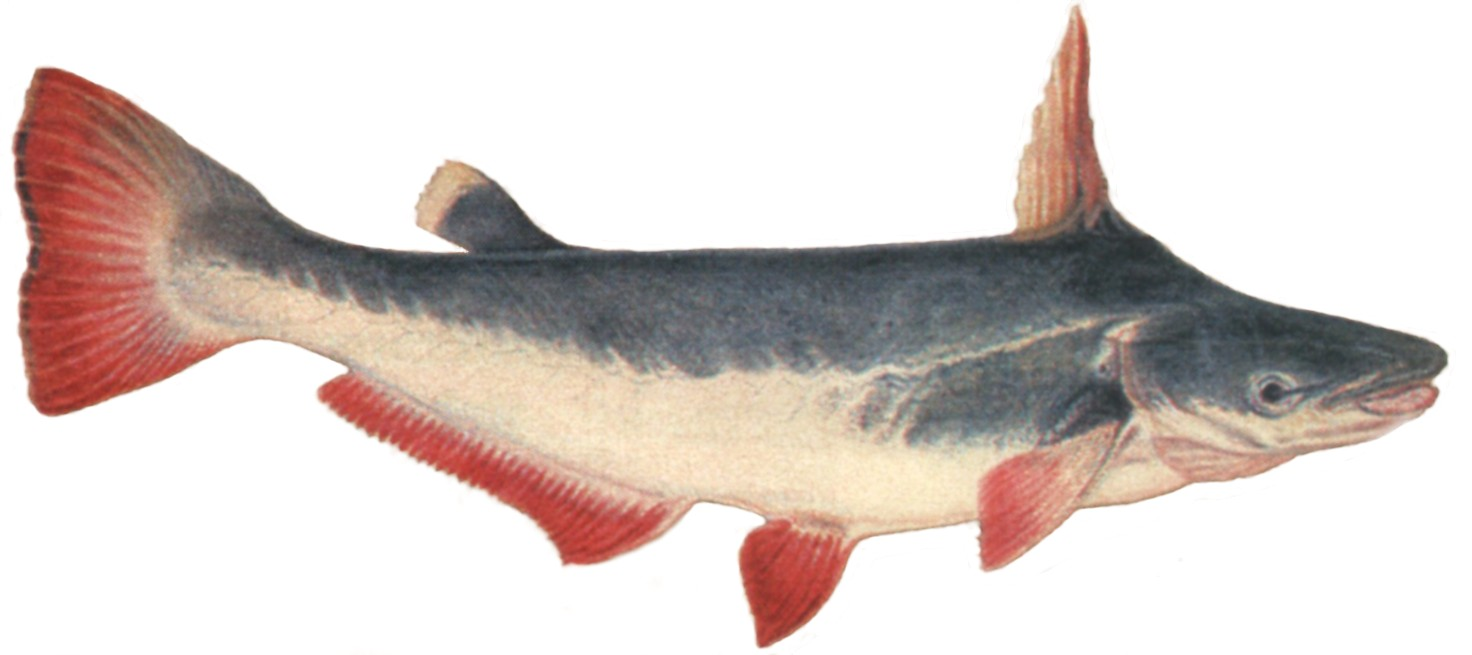
- Ageneiosus militaris

Scientific classification
- Kingdom: Animalia
- Phylum: Chordata
- Class: Actinopterygii
- Division: Teleostei
- Order: Siluriformes
- Family: Auchenipteridae
- Subfamily: Auchenipterinae
- Genus: Ageneiosus; Lacépède, 1803

Type species
- Ageneiosus armatus Lacépède, 1803

Synonyms
- Ceratorhynchus Spix & Agassiz, 1829; Agenius Agassiz, 1846; Davalla Bleeker, 1858; Pseudageneiosus Bleeker, 1862

= Ageneiosus =

Genus of fishes

Ageneiosus is a genus of driftwood catfishes found mostly in South America with one species extending into Central America.

== Species ==
Thirteen species in this genus are recognized:

- Ageneiosus akamai Ribeiro, Rapp Py-Daniel & Walsh, 2017
- Ageneiosus apiaka Ribeiro, Rapp Py-Daniel & Walsh, 2017
- Ageneiosus dentatus Kner, 1857
- Ageneiosus inermis (Linnaeus, 1766) (manduba)
- Ageneiosus intrusus Ribeiro, Rapp Py-Daniel & Walsh, 2017
- Ageneiosus lineatus Ribeiro, Rapp Py-Daniel & Walsh, 2017
- Ageneiosus magoi Castillo G. & Brull G., 1989
- Ageneiosus militaris Valenciennes, 1836
- Ageneiosus pardalis Lütken, 1874
- Ageneiosus polystictus Steindachner, 1915
- Ageneiosus ucayalensis Castelnau, 1855
- Ageneiosus uranophthalmus Ribeiro & Rapp Py-Daniel, 2010
- Ageneiosus vittatus Steindachner, 1908
