= Epapterus =

Epapaterus

Scientific classification
- Kingdom: Animalia
- Phylum: Chordata
- Class: Actinopterygii
- Division: Teleostei
- Order: Siluriformes
- Family: Auchenipteridae
- Subfamily: Auchenipterinae
- Genus: Epapterus; Cope, 1878

Type species
- Epapterus dispilurus Cope, 1878

Genus of fishes

Epapterus is a genus of driftwood catfishes that occur in South America. There are currently two described species in this genus.

== Species ==
- Epapterus blohmi Vari, S. L. Jewett, Taphorn & C. R. Gilbert, 1984
- Epapterus dispilurus Cope, 1878
