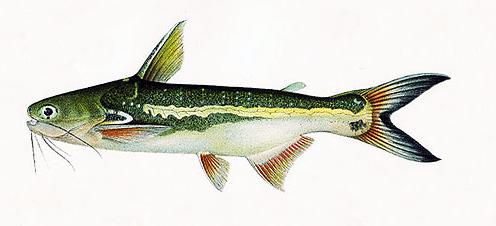
- Trachelyopterus galeatus

Scientific classification
- Kingdom: Animalia
- Phylum: Chordata
- Class: Actinopterygii
- Division: Teleostei
- Order: Siluriformes
- Family: Auchenipteridae
- Subfamily: Auchenipterinae
- Genus: Trachelyopterus; Valenciennes, 1840

Type species
- Trachelyopterus coriaceus Valenciennes, 1840

Species
- See text.

Synonyms
- Parauchenipterus Bleeker, 1862

= Trachelyopterus =

Genus of fishes

Trachelyopterus is a genus of driftwood catfishes. They have been found in South American environments, including Venezuela, Colombia, Peru, Argentina, and several places in Brazil. They have a body pattern that follows bilateral symmetry and reproduce sexually. In terms of sensory systems, Trachelypterus' have otoliths for hearing and lens eyes for seeing; they also have capabilities of electroreception. The size and appearance of different species within the Trachelyopterus genus varies, with sizes ranging from 5.5 inches in T. albicrux to 7.9 inches in T. insignis to 8.4 inches in T. lucenai. These small catfishes are marketed towards aquariums.

== Feeding and diet ==
The Trachelyopterus lucenai catfishes feed primarily on autochthonous materials in the ecosystem but do consume allochthonous particulate as well. A study by Becker found that the stomach contents of these catfishes varied widely among trophic levels; organisms ranging from fish to crabs to insects. Given this diversity found in the stomach content of T. lucenai, it is reasonable to conclude that these animals navigate throughout the whole water column in search of food, rather than limiting their niche to only surface waters or only benthic habitats. Furthermore, this variability in eating behavior lends to the characterization of the driftwood catfishes as omnivorous organisms, since they feed at more than one trophic level. Additionally, this genus may be considered to follow opportunistic feeding behaviors. Opportunistic feeding behaviors are characterized by a varied food selection which ultimately contributes to increased adaptability as animals rely on more than one source of energy. There were no significant differences in feeding habits observed between males and females.

== Reproductive period and strategies ==
Trachelyopterus lucenai has a reproductive season from October through March. These reproductive months correspond to species abundance; the highest prevalence of the driftwood catfishes falls from October to March, while they are least abundant from April through December. Maia, et al also found that temperature may be an important consideration when determining reproductive season for these individuals. In another study, Fontoura, et al. also examined reproductive details and found that the gonadosomatic index (GSI) values were highest in November through February. These data correspond to one another in that Fontoura, et al.'s findings fit within the expected reproductive period given by Maia, et al. In terms of fecundity, T. lucenai females produce about 1536 oocytes each. Additionally, there was a correlation noticed between female length and number of oocytes; the longer the length of the female, the more oocytes were produced, indicating a positive relationship.

Trachelyopterus striatulus was studied in terms of reproductive strategies. Paired testes in males were observed. The testes are composed of two regions: the interstitial region, which is responsible for steroid hormone genesis, and the tubular region, which is responsible for the production of sperm. In their work, Santos, et al., found that T. striatus fishes were about 15 cm long, with a whole-body weight of about 81.17 +/- 34.51 grams. The weight of the testes was 9.16 +/- 6.11 grams with an average length of about 35.23 +/- 6.94 mm. The researchers found that sperm of T. striatulus developed in cysts, which would then burst, ultimately leading to the release of the sperm that were housed within. The process of sperm formation occurs in steps. The first form developed is the primary spermatogonia, which is the largest of the cells in the process of spermatogenesis. Following the formation of the primary spermatogonia, the secondary spermatogonia is developed, then the primary spermatocyte, the secondary spermatocyte, the spermatid, and finally the spermatozoa; there is a decrease in the size of these cells as they are developed throughout the process.

Further support that Trachelyopterus catfishes reproduce via insemination was gathered from work done by Burns, et al., who studied the ultrastructure of sperm in these animals. They found that the sperm cells of T. lucenai have a single flagellum and are characterized by both elongated nuclear and middle section. The elongation of the middle section of the sperm cell was associated with higher levels of mitochondria; this could suggest that the mitochondria were supplying energy to the cell to aid in the transport to the female reproductive tract. Furthermore, the presence of other structures, like microtubules, suggest the importance of structural integrity needed to move through fluids.

== Threats ==
Research within the Trachelyopterus genus on the species T. striatulus focused on these organisms as hosts for parasitic activity. Researchers found that T. striatulus individuals host a variety of parasites at somewhat high levels, with about 40.6 parasites found per fish. No significant relationship was concluded between parasitic frequency in respect to sex nor with parasitism in respect to length of fish body. Perhaps this could be interpreted to mean that the fish maintain similar eating habits, regardless of sex or age. Furthermore, the article suggests that one type of parasite, the monogeneans, might lead to increased production and development of mucus on the fish skin, leading to difficulties in respiration for these individuals. Furthermore, in a different study, done by Santos, et al., looked at the parasite Kudoa orbicularis and its relationship to T. galeatus. The individuals of the T. galeatus species that were observed for this study were found in Marajó Island of northern Brazil. They described the K. orbicularis species to appear as pseudocysts in the muscle tissue of T. galeatus. The parasite apparently took over in such a way as to replace the sarcoplasmic reticulum within the musculature tissue, disrupting the integrtiey of the muscle's structure. Despite this change in structure to muscle, T. galeatus did not exhibit signs of an inflammatory response.

== Genetics ==
When B chromosomes were studied in some species within the Trachelyopterus genus, specifically T. galeatus and T. porosus, it was determined that both of these species had 58 chromosomes, following a diploid structure. This finding was the same for both males and females.

== Species ==
Trachelyopterus currently contains 18 described species:

- Trachelyopterus albicrux (C. Berg (es), 1901)
- Trachelyopterus amblops (Meek & Hildebrand, 1913)
- Trachelyopterus analis (C. H. Eigenmann & R. S. Eigenmann, 1888)
- Trachelyopterus brevibarbis (Cope, 1878)
- Trachelyopterus ceratophysus (Kner, 1858)
- Trachelyopterus coriaceus Valenciennes, 1840
- Trachelyopterus cratensis (Miranda Ribeiro, 1937)
- Trachelyopterus fisheri (C. H. Eigenmann, 1916) (Driftwood catfish)
- Trachelyopterus galeatus (Linnaeus, 1766)
- Trachelyopterus insignis (Steindachner, 1878)
- Trachelyopterus isacanthus (Cope, 1878)
- Trachelyopterus lacustris (Lütken, 1874)
- Trachelyopterus leopardinus (Borodin, 1927)
- Trachelyopterus lucenai Bertoletti (pt), J. F. P. da Silva & E. H. L. Pereira, 1995 (Southern driftwood catfish)
- Trachelyopterus peloichthys (L. P. Schultz, 1944)
- Trachelyopterus porosus (C. H. Eigenmann & R. S. Eigenmann, 1888)
- Trachelyopterus striatulus (Steindachner, 1877) (Singing catfish)
- Trachelyopterus teaguei (Devincenzi, 1942)
