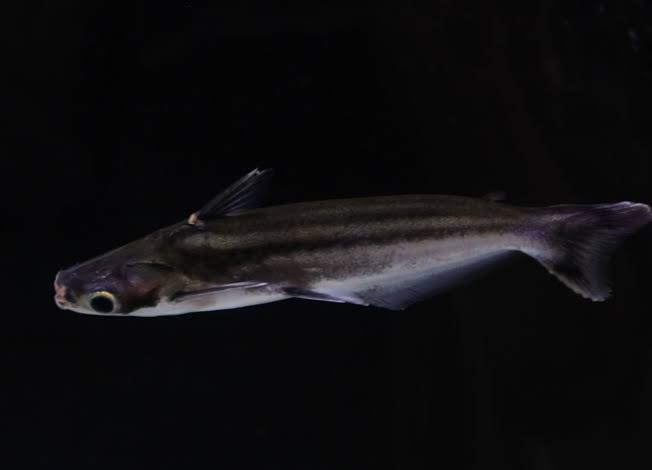
- Auchenipterus nuchalis

Scientific classification
- Kingdom: Animalia
- Phylum: Chordata
- Class: Actinopterygii
- Order: Siluriformes
- Family: Auchenipteridae
- Subfamily: Auchenipterinae
- Genus: Auchenipterus; Valenciennes, 1840

Type species
- Hypophthalmus nuchalis Spix & Agassiz, 1829

Species
- See text.

Synonyms
- Euanemus Müller & Troschel, 1842; Auchenopterus Agassiz, 1846; Ceratocheilus Miranda Ribeiro, 1918; Osteomystax Whitley, 1940

= Auchenipterus =

Genus of fishes

Auchenipterus is a genus of driftwood catfishes (order Siluriformes).

== Taxonomy ==
The genus is hypothesized to be monophyletic, diagnosed by the shared presence of grooves in the ventral surface of the head that accommodate adducted mental barbels. The presence of papillae on the dorsal and medial surface of the ossified maxillary barbel of mature males is also a possible synapomorphy, but in three species this cannot be confirmed as there are no adult male specimens yet discovered.

This genus contains 11 species:

- Auchenipterus ambyiacus Fowler, 1915
- Auchenipterus brachyurus (Cope, 1878)
- Auchenipterus brevior C. H. Eigenmann, 1912
- Auchenipterus britskii Ferraris & Vari, 1999
- Auchenipterus demerarae C. H. Eigenmann, 1912
- Auchenipterus dentatus Valenciennes, 1840
- Auchenipterus fordicei C. H. Eigenmann & R. S. Eigenmann, 1888
- Auchenipterus menezesi Ferraris & Vari, 1999
- Auchenipterus nigripinnis (Boulenger, 1895)
- Auchenipterus nuchalis (Spix & Agassiz, 1829)
- Auchenipterus osteomystax (A. Miranda-Ribeiro, 1918)

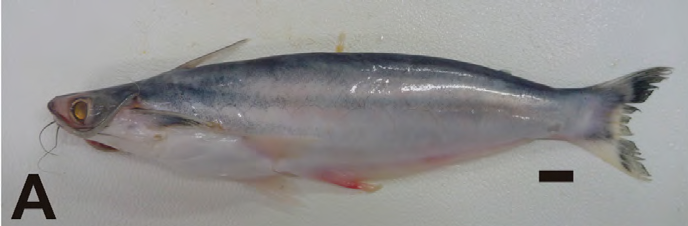
A. nuchalis, scale bar = 1 cm

== Distribution ==
The neotropical genus Auchenipterus is widely distributed in most of the river systems east of the Andean Cordilleras. The species are found through the Orinoco River, Amazon River, and Rio de La Plata basins, and the coastal drainages of the Guianas; one species, A. menezesi, originates from the Rio Pindark-Mirim and Rio Parnaiba basins of northeastern Brazil. In some regions they are abundant enough to be commercially important.

== Description ==
Auchenipterus species have a number of pronounced sexually dimorphic features of the head, maxillary barbels, and anal fin.
