= Gerlof Mees =

Dutch ichthyologist, ornithologist and museum curator

Gerlof Fokko Mees (16 June 1926 – 31 March 2013) was a Dutch ichthyologist, ornithologist and museum curator. During 1946 to 1949 he took part as a conscript in the military actions to reestablish rule in the Dutch East Indies. During that time he became interested in the avian family Zosteropidae, comprising the white-eyes.

Mees was born at Bloemendaal in the Netherlands. He was introduced to natural history by his parents and was introduced to birds by his uncle Jan Verwey. He attended the University of Leiden where he studied biology, obtaining his doctorate in 1956 with a break in Java as part of the Dutch forces during the Indonesian war of independence. It was during his time in Java that he took a special interest in white-eyes (Zosterops) and also an introduction to George Junge. During 1953-54 he visited Trinidad and Tobago and collected bird specimens. He was an assistant at the department birds of the Rijksmuseum van Natuurlijke Historie in Leiden from May 1955 to June 1957. His doctoral thesis was on the Indo-Australian Zosteropidae. Thereafter he became Curator of Vertebrates at the Western Australian Museum from 1958 to 1963. While in Australia he met and married Veronica. The death of Junge led to his appointment back in the Netherlands as Curator of Birds at the Rijksmuseum in Leiden. He held the position until his retirement, after which he returned to Western Australia in 1991, and lived in Perth and Northcliffe. He died in Busselton, Western Australia.

He gave the first description of the unusual fish species, the salamander fish of Western Australia.

Mees's nightjar, the proposed name for the new species Caprimulgus meesi, is named for him.
