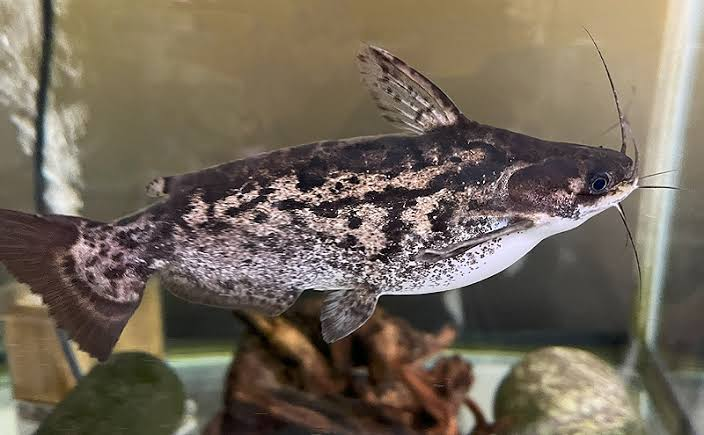
- Trachelyopterus fisheri

Scientific classification
- Kingdom: Animalia
- Phylum: Chordata
- Class: Actinopterygii
- Order: Siluriformes
- Superfamily: Siluroidea
- Family: Auchenipteridae; Bleeker, 1862

Subfamilies and genera
- Auchenipterinae; Ageneiosus; Asterophysus; Auchenipterichthys; Auchenipterus; Entomocorus; Epapterus; Liosomadoras; Pseudauchenipterus; Pseudepapterus; Pseudotatia; Spinipterus; Tetranematichthys; Tocantinsia; Trachelyichthys; Trachelyopterichthys; Trachelyopterus; Trachycorystes; Tympanopleura; Centromochlinae; Centromochlus; Duringlanis; Ferrarissoaresia; Gelanoglanis; Gephyromochlus; Glanidium; Tatia

= Driftwood catfish =

Driftwood catfishes

Family of fishes

The driftwood catfishes are catfishes of the family Auchenipteridae. The two genera of the former family Ageneiosidae have been placed here, resulting in a grouping of about 125 species in about 22 genera. These fish are found in rivers from Panama to Argentina, commonly in river flood plains.

As in many other catfish, Auchenipteridae are mainly defined by features of their skeleton and swim bladder. All but one species have three pairs of barbels, with the nasal barbels absent. Most species have very small adipose fins. Additionally, many driftwood catfish possess prominent serrations on their dorsal and pectoral fin-spines; in many species, these serrations occur on both the outer (anterior) and inner (posterior) face of their fin-spines. While the fidalgo (Ageneiosus inermis) is known to reach 59 cm (23 in) in length, most are smaller, with some species not known at any longer than 3 cm (1.2 in). The eggs are fertilised internally.

Driftwood catfishes are nocturnal. Some of the smaller species are known to hide in logs and crevices during the day, and come out to feed at night. Some larger species can consume fruits and insects, and are probably omnivorous. Fish of this family seem to feed primarily on insects, but also eat fish, shrimp, fruit, and even filamentous algae and other plant material, at least occasionally.

The following cladogram is based on a 2014 study of catfish morphology:

- Auchenipteridae
  - Centromochlinae
    - Glanidium
    - - Centromochlus
      - Gelanoglanis
      - Tatia
  - Auchenipterinae
    - Tocantinsia
    - - - Asterophysus
        - Liosomadoras
      - - - Pseudotatia
          - Pseudauchenipterus
        - - - Trachelyichthys
            - - Auchenipterichthys
              - - Trachelyopterichthys
                - - Trachycorystes
                  - Trachelyopterus
          - - Spinipterus
            - - - Tetranematichthys
                - Ageneiosus
              - - Entomocorus
                - - Auchenipterus
                  - - Pseudepapterus
                    - Epapterus
