= Ranae =

Ranae may refer to:

- The Frogs (or Ranae in Latin), an ancient Greek comedy by Aristophanes
- Besla ranae, a species of sea snail
- Ophiotaenia ranae, a species of tapeworm
- Hydrocharis morsus-ranae, a species of flowering plants
- RaNae Bair, American javelin thrower
- McCall RaNae Zerboni, American soccer player
