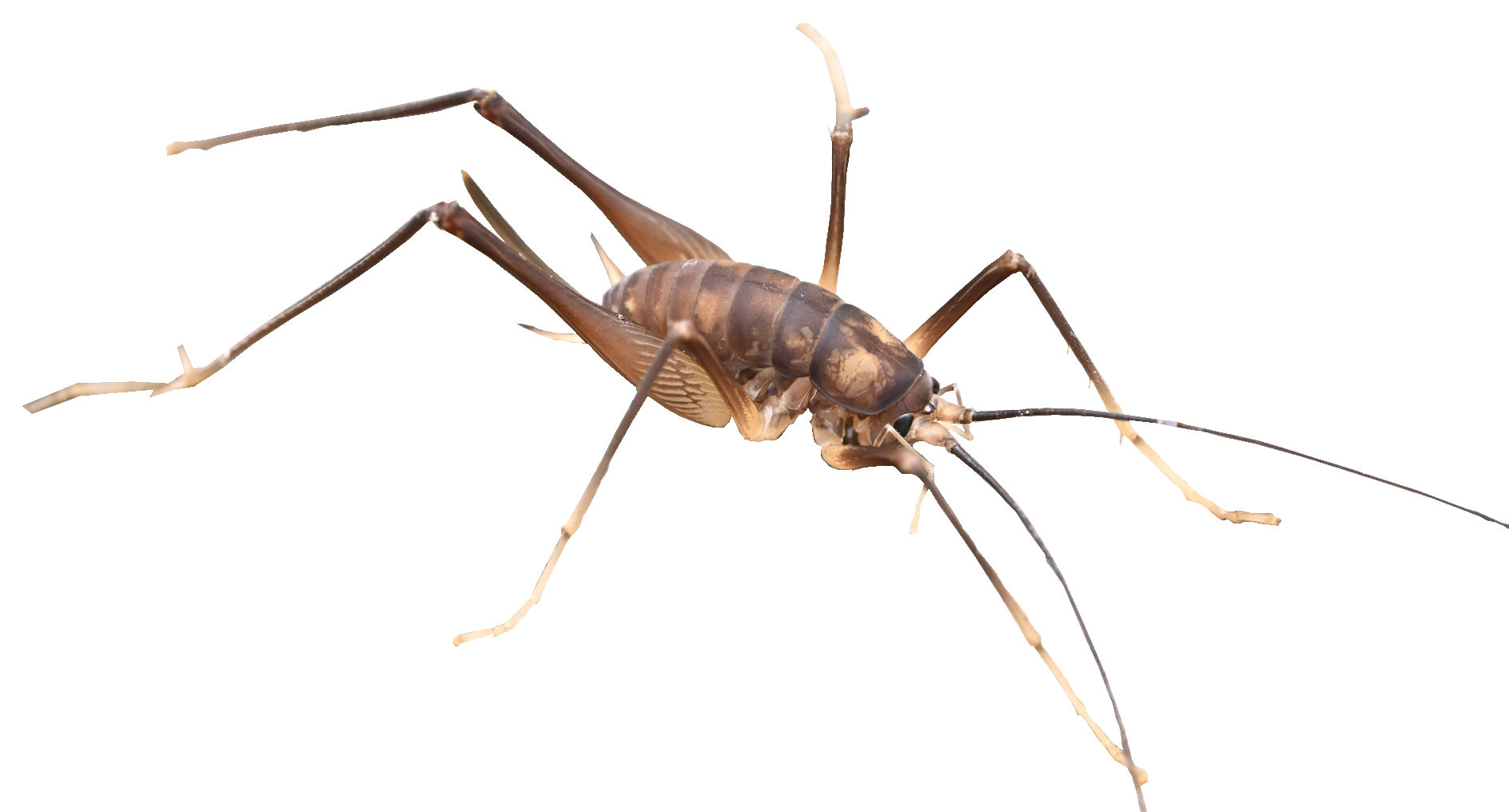
- Female from Abel Tasman National Park

Scientific classification
- Kingdom: Animalia
- Phylum: Arthropoda
- Clade: Pancrustacea
- Class: Insecta
- Order: Orthoptera
- Suborder: Ensifera
- Family: Rhaphidophoridae
- Genus: Macropathus
- Species: M. filifer

Binomial name
- Macropathus filifer Walker, 1869

= Macropathus filifer =

Species of insect

Macropathus filifer is a species of jumping wētā found in caves of the northwest South Island of New Zealand.

== Taxonomy ==
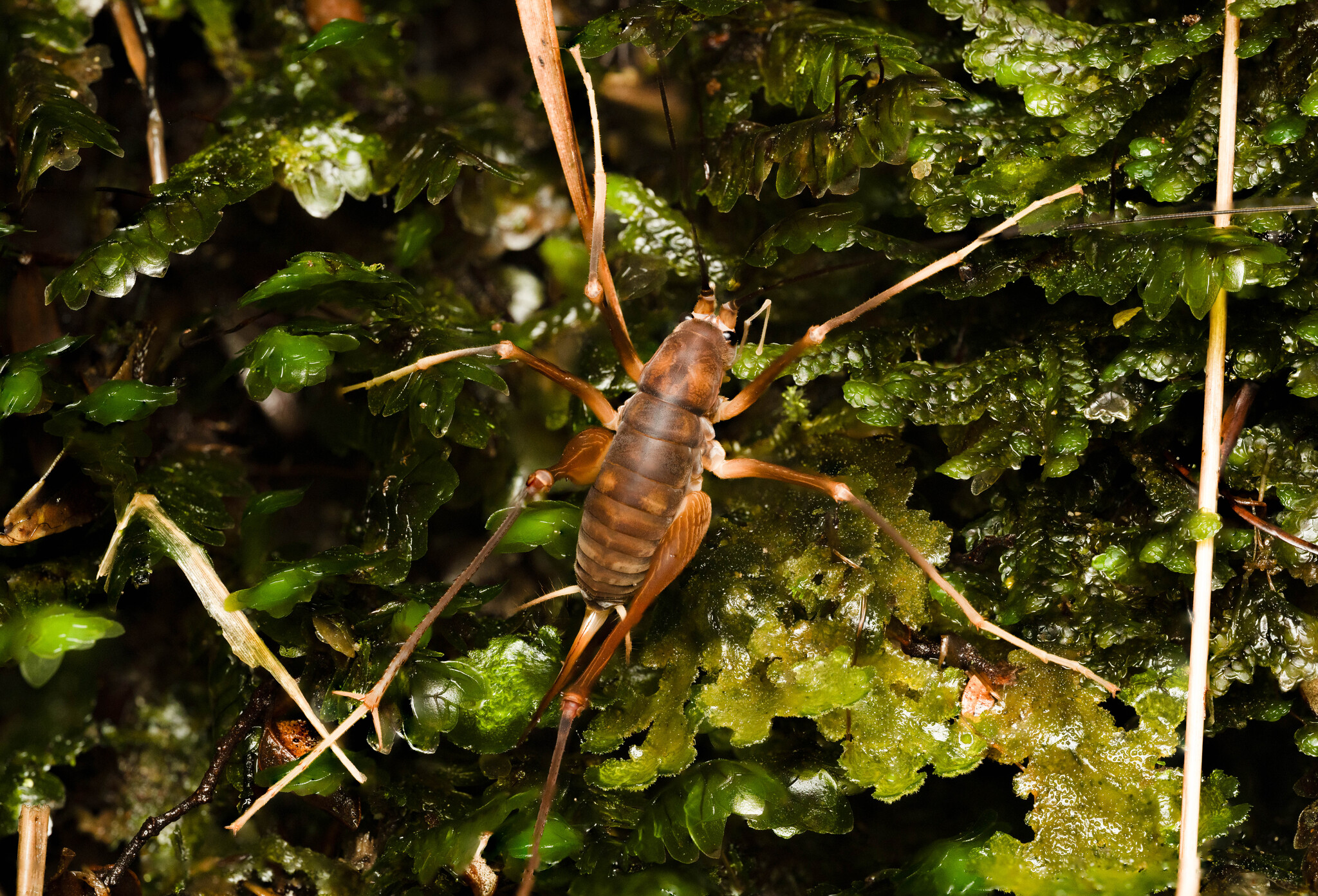
Macropathus filifer observed at Denniston.

Macropathus filifer was described under its present name by Francis Walker in 1869. Walker created the genus Macropathus at the same time, placing two other species into it, M. fascifer and M. altus. He made M. filifer the type species for the genus Macropathus. However, the species soon became in taxonomic confusion. The genus Pachyrhamma was erected in 1888 by Brunner von Wattenwyl. However, according to Aola Richards, his description of the generic characteristics closely matched those of Macropathus, and she synonymized the two Pachyrhamma species Brunner described with M. filifer. (Note: There is in fact a chain of synonymy: Richards found that Brunner's P. edwardsii matched Walker's M. filifer and that Brunner's P. novae-seelandiae matched Walker's M. fascifer, which was in turn a synonym of M. filifer, the most senior name of the group.) Richards noted in her 1954 revision of the genus Macropathus:

Examination of over one hundred and twenty specimens of Macropathus filifer has shown me the wide range of variability which occurs within the species, especially in the number of spines of the legs, and because of this, I have no hesitation in grouping all these species under the name Macropathus filifer Walker, 1869.

In 1897, Hutton redescribed both genera in an attempt to distinguish them, as part of an effort to clarify the taxonomy of New Zealand's cave wētās. Hutton noted, "the cave-wetas are in the greatest confusion, and we do not know whether there are six or only two species". However, as Richards drily noted in 1954, "his description of Macropathus is completely different from that given by Walker". According to her, Hutton apparently swapped or transposed the two genera. In 1954, Richards revised and redescribed the genus Macropathus, providing a description of the past taxonomic confusion and synonymizing fascifer and altus with filifer, giving the latter name priority. She also added a new species to the genus, Macropathus delli, which has since been reclassified into the genus Pachyrhamma.

== Distribution ==
Aola Richards found specimens of M. filifer from around Wellington and islands in the Marlborough Sounds. Other researchers have recorded the species from Golden Bay in Tasman, while records from the citizen science platform iNaturalist show the species extending through the Tasman and West Coast regions as far south as Aoraki.

== Bibliography ==
- Allegrucci, Giuliana; Trewick, Steve A.; Fortunato, Angela; Carchini, Gianmaria; Sbordoni, Valerio (2010). "Cave crickets and cave weta (Orthoptera, Rhaphidophoridae) from the southern end of the World: a molecular phylogeny test of biogeographical hypotheses". Journal of Orthoptera Research. 19 (1): 121–130. ISSN 1082-6467.
- Richards, Aola M. (November 1954a). "Notes on Food and Cannibalism in Macropathus filifer Walker, 1869 (Rhaphidophoridae, Orthoptera)" (PDF). Transactions of the Royal Society of New Zealand. 82 (3): 733–737.
- ――― (November 1954b). "Notes on Behaviour and Parasitism in Macropathus filifer Walker, 1869" (PDF). Transactions of the Royal Society of New Zealand. 82 (3): 821–822.
- ——— (November 1954c). "The Systematics and Ecology of the Genus Macropathus Walker, 1869 (Orthoptera, Rhaphidophoridae)" (PDF). Transactions of the Royal Society of New Zealand. 82 (3): 739–762.
- ——— (September 1955). "The Anatomy and Morphology of the Cave-Orthopteran Macropathus filifer Walker, 1869" (PDF). Transactions of the Royal Society of New Zealand. 83 (2): 405–452.
- ——— (August 1958). "Revision of the Rhaphidophoridae (Orthoptera) of New Zealand. Part II. The Genus Macropathus Walker in the British Museum (Nat. Hist.) Collection" (PDF). Transactions of the Royal Society of New Zealand. 85 (3): 465–470.
- Walker, Francis (1869–71). Catalogue of the specimens of Dermaptera Saltatoria in the collection of the British Museum. Part V. London: E. Newman, Devonshire Street.
