= Ophiotaenia =

Scientific classification
- Kingdom: Animalia
- Phylum: Platyhelminthes
- Class: Cestoda
- Order: Onchoproteocephalidea
- Family: Proteocephalidae
- Subfamily: Proteocephalinae
- Genus: Ophiotaenia

Species
- See text

Synonyms
- Adenobrechmos Bursey, Goldberg & Kraus, 2006; Batrachotaenia Rudin, 1917; Solenotaenia Beddard, 1913

Genus of flatworms

Ophiotaenia is a genus of tapeworms in the Proteocephalidae family.

== Species ==
- Ophiotaenia adiposa Rudin, 1917
- Ophiotaenia agkistrodontis Harwood, 1933
- Ophiotaenia alessandrae Marsella & de Chambrier, 2008
- Ophiotaenia alternans Riser, 1942
- Ophiotaenia amphiumae (Zeliff, 1932) Riser, 1942
- Ophiotaenia andersoni Jensen, Schmidt & Kuntz, 1983
- Ophiotaenia atretiumi (Devi, 1973) de Chambrier, Scholz, Mariaux & Kuchta, 2017
- Ophiotaenia azevedoi (de Chambrier & Vaucher, 1992) Ammann & de Chambrier, 2008
- Ophiotaenia barbouri Vigueras, 1934
- Ophiotaenia bonariensis Szidat & Soria, 1954
- Ophiotaenia bonneti de Chambrier, Coquille & Brooks, 2006
- Ophiotaenia bufonis (Vigueras, 1942) Yamaguti, 1959
- Ophiotaenia bungari de Chambrier, Binh & Scholz, 2012
- Ophiotaenia calamensis Puga & Formas, 2005
- Ophiotaenia calmettei Barrois, 1898
- Ophiotaenia carpathica Sharpilo, Kornyushin & Lisitsina, 1979
- Ophiotaenia catzeflisi (de Chambrier & Vaucher, 1992) Ammann & de Chambrier, 2008
- Ophiotaenia ceratophryos (Parodi & Widakowich, 1916) de Chambrier, Coquille & Brooks, 2006
- Ophiotaenia chandrae (de Chambrier & Gil de Pertierra, 2012) de Chambrier & Gil de Pertierra, 2012
- Ophiotaenia chattoraji Srivastava, 1980
- Ophiotaenia cohospes Cordero, 1946
- Ophiotaenia congolensis Southwell & Lake, 1939
- Ophiotaenia crotali Lopez-Neyra & Diaz-Ungria, 1958
- Ophiotaenia crotaphopeltis Sandground, 1928
- Ophiotaenia cryptobranchi La Rue, 1914
- Ophiotaenia dubinini Freze & Sharpilo, 1965
- Ophiotaenia echidis de Chambrier, Alves, Schuster & Scholz, 2021
- Ophiotaenia ecuadorensis Dyer, 1986
- Ophiotaenia elapsoidae Sandground, 1928
- Ophiotaenia elongata Fuhrmann, 1927
- Ophiotaenia europaea Odening, 1963
- Ophiotaenia euzeti (de Chambrier & Vaucher, 1992) Ammann & de Chambrier, 2008
- Ophiotaenia faranciae MacCallum, 1921
- Ophiotaenia filaroides (La Rue, 1909) La Rue, 1911
- Ophiotaenia fima (Meggitt, 1927) Hilmy, 1936
- Ophiotaenia flava Rudin, 1917
- Ophiotaenia gabonica Beddard, 1913
- Ophiotaenia gallardi (Johnston, 1911) Freze, 1965
- Ophiotaenia georgievi de Chambrier, Ammann & Scholz, 2010
- Ophiotaenia gilberti Amman & de Chambrier, 2008
- Ophiotaenia gracilis Jones, Cheng & Gillespie, 1958
- Ophiotaenia grandis La Rue, 1911
- Ophiotaenia greeri (Bursey, Goldberg & Kraus, 2006) de Chambrier, Coquille, Mariaux & Tkach, 2009
- Ophiotaenia habanensis Freze & Rysavy, 1976
- Ophiotaenia hanumanthai Ramadevi, 1974
- Ophiotaenia hernandezi (Flores-Barroeta, 1955) de Chambrier, Coquille & Brooks, 2006
- Ophiotaenia hyalina Rudin, 1917
- Ophiotaenia indica Johri, 1955
- Ophiotaenia japonensis Yamaguti, 1935
- Ophiotaenia jarara Fuhrmann, 1927
- Ophiotaenia joanae (de Chambrier & Paulino, 1997) Ammann & de Chambrier, 2008
- Ophiotaenia kuantanensis Yeh, 1956
- Ophiotaenia lapata Rambeloson, Rainavoson & de Chambrier, 2012
- Ophiotaenia loennbergii (Fuhrmann, 1895) La Rue, 1911
- Ophiotaenia lopesi Rego, 1967
- Ophiotaenia macrobothria Rudin, 1917
- Ophiotaenia magna Hannum, 1925
- Ophiotaenia marenzelleri (Barrois, 1898) La Rue, 1911
- Ophiotaenia micruricola (Shoop & Corkum, 1982) Schmidt, 1986
- Ophiotaenia mjobergi (Nybelin, 1917) Wardle & McLeod, 1972
- Ophiotaenia najae Beddard, 1913
- Ophiotaenia nankingensis Hsü, 1935
- Ophiotaenia nattereri (Parona, 1901) La Rue, 1911
- Ophiotaenia nicoleae Coquille & de Chambrier, 2008
- Ophiotaenia nigricollis Mettrick, 1963
- Ophiotaenia niuginii (Schmidt, 1975) de Chambrier, Scholz, Mariaux & Kuchta, 2017
- Ophiotaenia noei Wolffhugel, 1948
- Ophiotaenia nybelini Hilmy, 1936
- Ophiotaenia olor (Ingles, 1936) Yamaguti, 1938
- Ophiotaenia olseni Dyer & Altig, 1977
- Ophiotaenia ophiodex Mettrick, 1960
- Ophiotaenia oumanskyi de Chambrier & Gil de Pertierra, 2012
- Ophiotaenia papuensis (Bursey, Goldberg & Kraus, 2008) Scholz, de Chambrier, Kudlai, Tkach & McAllister, 2023
- Ophiotaenia paraguayensis Rudin, 1917
- Ophiotaenia perspicua La Rue, 1911
- Ophiotaenia phillipsi (Burt, 1937) Wardle & McLeod, 1952
- Ophiotaenia racemosa (Rudolphi, 1819) La Rue, 1911
- Ophiotaenia ranae Yamaguti, 1938
- Ophiotaenia rhabdophidis Burt, 1937
- Ophiotaenia sanbernardinensis Rudin, 1917
- Ophiotaenia saphena Osler, 1931
- Ophiotaenia schultzei (Hungerbühler, 1910) Dickley, 1921
- Ophiotaenia sinensis Cheng & Lin, 2002
- Ophiotaenia southwelli Freze, 1965
- Ophiotaenia spasskii Freze& Sharpilo, 1965
- Ophiotaenia theileri Rudin, 1917
- Ophiotaenia tigrina (Woodland, 1925) de Chambrier, Coquille & Brooks, 2006
- Ophiotaenia trimeresuri (Parona, 1898) La Rue, 1911
- Ophiotaenia variabilis (Brooks, 1978) Ammann & de Chambrier, 2008
- Ophiotaenia viperis (Beddard, 1913) Rudin, 1917
- Ophiotaenia wuyiensis Cheng, Lin & Zao, 2007
- Ophiotaenia zschokkei Rudin, 1917
