= Besla waitangiensis =

Scientific classification
- Kingdom: Animalia
- Phylum: Mollusca
- Class: Gastropoda
- Family: Pyramidellidae
- Genus: Besla
- Species: B. waitangiensis

Binomial name
- Besla waitangiensis Laws, 1941

Species of gastropod

Besla waitangiensis is a species of sea snail, a marine gastropod mollusk in the family Pyramidellidae, the pyrams and their allies. The species is one of twelve known species within the Besla genus of gastropods. The species is one of three species within the Besla genus to have a binomial name accepted by Charles Reed Laws in 1941, with the exception of the other two being Besla rossiana and Besla vaga.

== Distribution ==
This marine species is known to be distributed throughout marine terrain off the coasts of New Zealand, within the New Zealand Exclusive Economic Zone.
