= Hope Sanderson =

New Zealand geologist

- Born: Helen Augusta Hope MacDonald; 27 November 1925; New Zealand
- Died: 6 May 2016 (aged 90); London
- Education: University of Auckland
- Known for: First NZ woman to gain a postgraduate geology degree
- Spouse: Robin Sanderson
- Scientific career
- Fields: petrology
- Workplaces: University of Auckland, Geological Museum
- Thesis: A Petrological Study of the Jurassic conglomerates at Kawhia (1951)

Helen Augusta Hope Sanderson (known as Hope, née MacDonald; 27 November 1925 – 6 May 2016) was a New Zealand geologist, and was the first New Zealand woman to graduate with MSc with Honours in Geology at a New Zealand university.

== Early life and education ==
Born 27 November 1925 in New Zealand, Sanderson's parents were farmers near Colville, on the Coromandel Peninsula. The farm was accessible only by boat or on horseback. As Sanderson and her two sisters grew old enough for school, the farm was sold, and the MacDonalds moved to their paternal great-grandfather's original homestead in Howick. Sanderson attended Auckland Diocesan School for Girls, before enrolling at Auckland University College. She graduated with a BSc in 1949, and followed it with an MSc on the petrography of Jurassic conglomerates at Kawhia, encouraged by Professor John Arthur Bartrum.

The conglomerates Sanderson studied occur in an outcrop along coastal cliffs from Ururoa Point to Albatross Point and parts of the south Kawhia Harbour coast. They are isolated and even today parts are accessible only by boat. Sanderson did much of her fieldwork for her thesis on horseback, with the help of field assistants Charles Laws, Alan Mason, and Helen Pirie. Laws was the paleontologist in the Geology Department, Mason had just completed an MSc in geology, and Pirie was a fellow geology student. When Sanderson graduated in 1951, she held the first postgraduate degree in geology by a woman at a New Zealand university.

== Career ==
Sanderson worked as a research assistant and lapidary technician in the Geology Department at Auckland University College for almost five years. During this time she prepared her thesis work for publication. She then, in January 1954, travelled to England for several months with a friend, Jocelyn Laws, whose father Charles had assisted Sanderson in the field. The visit was obviously a success, as in 1955 Sanderson had her university job held open for her while she returned to England for a working holiday. By this time she had a publication to go alongside her MSc with Honours and a strong reference from department head Arnold Lillie.

Sanderson successfully applied for a job with the British Geological Survey, initially employed as a technician. She was based in the Petrographical Department of the Geological Museum at South Kensington. The position represented a challenge to civil service administrators as there had not been a similarly qualified woman employed by the service previously. Eventually, an employment category was created specially for Sanderson, that of "experimental technician". In the ten years that Sanderson held her post, only one other woman was employed in the category. Sanderson's work involved identifying geological samples brought in by the general public, and preparing and examining thin-sections for research. For the Ministry of Works, she undertook fieldwork to source materials to repair heritage monuments and buildings, and undertook a petrographic examination of the samples collected in the field.

== Later life ==
In 1964, she married petrologist Robin Sanderson, and was required by civil service rules to resign from her job. Robin Sanderson had been working at the British Geological Survey but shortly after their marriage he took a curatorial position at the Natural History Museum. On retirement from that role, he worked as a consultant geologist, and specialised in the analysis, identification, and sourcing of stone for use in architectural reconstruction work. Since this was closely aligned with the work Sanderson had been doing during her career, Sanderson provided advice to her husband in this work.

Sanderson had two sons. She died on 6 May 2016 in London.

== Legacy ==
Sanderson's example inspired geologist Heather Nicholson to undertake a field-based MSc, mapping Waiheke island, completed in 1954.

In 2017 Sanderson was selected as one of the Royal Society Te Apārangi's 150 women in 150 words.

== Selected works ==
- MacDonald, Hope (1954). "The Petrography of Some Jurassic Conglomerates at Kawhia, New Zealand" (PDF). Transactions of the Royal Society of New Zealand. 82: 223–230. ISSN 0035-9181. Wikidata Q89183451.
- MacDonald, Hope (1951). A Petrological Study of the Jurassic conglomerates at Kawhia (MSc thesis). University of Auckland. Wikidata Q104986981.
