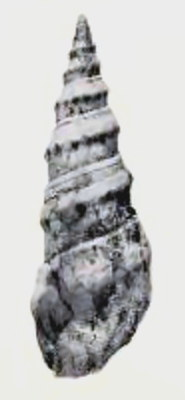
- Original image of a shell of Zemacies marginalis

Scientific classification
- Kingdom: Animalia
- Phylum: Mollusca
- Class: Gastropoda
- Subclass: Caenogastropoda
- Order: Neogastropoda
- Superfamily: Conoidea
- Family: Borsoniidae
- Genus: Zemacies
- Species: Z. marginalis

Binomial name
- Zemacies marginalis (P. Marshall, 1919)

Synonyms
- Surcula equispiralis Marshall, 1919; Surcula hampdenensis Marshall, 1920; Surcula marginalis Marshall, 1919

= Zemacies marginalis =

Extinct species of gastropod

Zemacies marginalis is an extinct species of sea snail, a marine gastropod mollusk in the family Borsoniidae.

== Description ==
(Original description from a single, imperfect specimen) Seven whorls remain on the spire, and there is a protoconch of three whorls. In the first six whorls there are eighteen tubercles on the keel, but the body whorl is smooth. Sutures are prominently bordered in front. All portions of the whorl have prominent spiral striations, including the tubercles. As shown by the growth lines the anal sinus is moderately sharp, but less so than in Zemacies hamiltoni (Hutton, 1905).

This species is closely related to Zemacies hamiltoni, but differs from it in having the prominent border of the suture, more numerous tubercles, and a much more abundant spiral ornamentation both above and below the keel.

== Distribution ==
This extinct marine species is endemic to New Zealand and was found in Middle Eocene strata.
