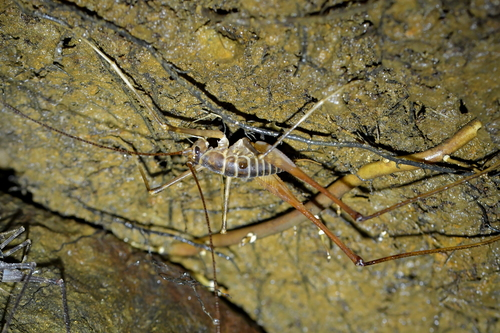
- An Auckland cave wētā (Pachyrhamma acanthoceras), found in Titirangi, Auckland, New Zealand.

Scientific classification
- Domain: Eukaryota
- Kingdom: Animalia
- Phylum: Arthropoda
- Class: Insecta
- Order: Orthoptera
- Suborder: Ensifera
- Family: Rhaphidophoridae
- Genus: Pachyrhamma
- Species: P. acanthoceras

Binomial name
- Pachyrhamma acanthoceras (Milligan, 1926)
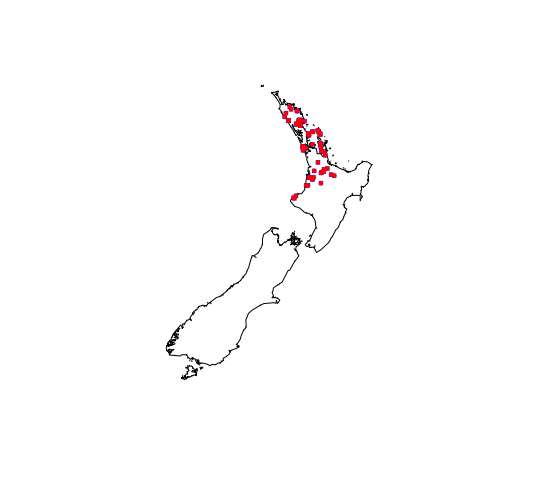
- Observations of Pachyrhamma acanthoceras from iNaturalist (as of September, 2021).

Synonyms
- Gymnoplectron acanthocera; P. acanthocera

= Pachyrhamma acanthoceras =

Auckland cave wētā

Species of orthopteran insect

Pachyrhamma acanthoceras, also known as the Auckland cave wētā, is a large species of cave wētā endemic to New Zealand.

It is distributed in the upper North Island, from Northland to Taranaki. This species is known to be present in old water-works tunnels in the Waitākere Ranges, west of Auckland.

Large groups of individuals can be found in the tunnels, but there is no known social life. These wētā are flightless and nocturnal.

== Description ==
Auckland cave wētā bodies are 3.5 centimetres in length. They have long hind legs and antennae, making their total length 25 centimetres.

Auckland cave wētā can be sexed due to sexually dimorphic body forms. The adult female is distinguished from the male by having a slightly curved, scimitar-like ovipositor that extends from the rare of her abdomen and is almost as long as her body. She lays eggs into the soil of the cave wall. Females have larger, stockier bodies, while males can be distinguished by long hind-legs, which suggests they might have the role of searchers in scramble-mate competition.

Both sexes have long filiform antennae between 150-200mm in length, which consist of over 500 flagellomeres (antennal segments) in total.

Males have large spines (fused setae) on their antennae, found on both the dorsal and ventral sides. Sensilla are sexually dimorphic, with females having longer sensilla than males.

They are a chocolate-brown colour with paler back edges to their segments. This gives them a banded appearance.

== Distribution and habitat ==
Cave wētā are often found in groups around or in the entrances of caves, behind projecting rocks or within crevices. Typically, younger individuals are found closer to the entrance than more mature individuals.

== Diet ==
Foraging behaviour occurs after dark when wētā leave crevices they occupy during the day.

Cave wētā are characterised as scavengers. Other insects, fungi, bryophytes and angiosperms are all known food sources of cave wētā. Cannibalism is also known to occur within cave wētā species, with most vulnerable times being during the mating season and post-moult.

== Taxonomy ==
Pachyrhamma acanthoceras are closely related to P. waipuense and P. waitomoense, and they could be treated as a single species.

Cook et al. (2010) follows W.F. Kirby (1906) and Karny (1937) in treating Pachyrhamma as a neuter noun, and thus use a neuter suffix for the species name, i.e. acanthoceras rather than acanthocera.
