= Besla rossiana =

Scientific classification
- Kingdom: Animalia
- Phylum: Mollusca
- Class: Gastropoda
- Family: Pyramidellidae
- Genus: Besla
- Species: B. rossiana

Binomial name
- Besla rossiana Laws, 1941

Species of sea snail

Besla rossiana is a species of sea snail, a marine gastropod mollusk in the family Pyramidellidae, the pyrams and their allies. The species is one of twelve known species within the Besla genus of gastropods. The species is one of three species with a binomial name accepted by Charles Reed Laws in 1941, the other two being Besla vaga and Besla waitangiensis.

== Distribution ==
This marine species is known to be distributed throughout marine terrain off the coasts of New Zealand, within the New Zealand Exclusive Economic Zone.
