= Alvania waimamakuensis =

Scientific classification
- Kingdom: Animalia
- Phylum: Mollusca
- Class: Gastropoda
- Subclass: Caenogastropoda
- Order: Littorinimorpha
- Superfamily: Rissooidea
- Family: Rissoidae
- Genus: Alvania
- Species: †A. waimamakuensis

Binomial name
- †Alvania waimamakuensis (Laws, 1948)

Synonyms
- † Alvania (Linemera) waimamakuensis (Laws, 1948) alternate representation; † Linemera waimamakuenis Laws, 1948

Extinct species of gastropod

Alvania waimamakuensis is an extinct species of minute sea snail, a marine gastropod mollusc or micromollusk in the family Rissoidae.

== Distribution ==
Fossils of this species were in Tertiary strata off Hokianga, New Zealand.
