= Ophiotaenia saphena =

Scientific classification
- Kingdom: Animalia
- Phylum: Platyhelminthes
- Class: Cestoda
- Order: Onchoproteocephalidea
- Family: Proteocephalidae
- Genus: Ophiotaenia
- Species: O. saphena

Binomial name
- Ophiotaenia saphena Osler, 1931

Species of tapeworm

Ophiotaenia saphena is a tapeworm native to North America, but has been introduced to Europe. It is parasite of frogs.
