= Odostomia aucklandica =

Scientific classification
- Kingdom: Animalia
- Phylum: Mollusca
- Class: Gastropoda
- Family: Pyramidellidae
- Genus: Odostomia
- Species: O. aucklandica

Binomial name
- Odostomia aucklandica Laws, 1939

Species of gastropod

Odostomia aucklandica is a species of sea snail, a marine gastropod mollusk in the family Pyramidellidae, the pyrams and their allies.
