= Odostomia manukauensis =

Scientific classification
- Kingdom: Animalia
- Phylum: Mollusca
- Class: Gastropoda
- Family: Pyramidellidae
- Genus: Odostomia
- Species: O. manukauensis

Binomial name
- Odostomia manukauensis Laws, 1939

Species of gastropod

Odostomia manukauensis is a species of gogalgay (plural gogalgae), a marine gastropod mollusk in the family Pyramidellidae, the pyrams and their allies.
