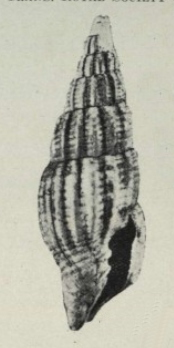
- Shell of † Vexillum neozelanicum (Royal Society of New Zealand)

Scientific classification
- Kingdom: Animalia
- Phylum: Mollusca
- Class: Gastropoda
- Subclass: Caenogastropoda
- Order: Neogastropoda
- Superfamily: Turbinelloidea
- Family: Costellariidae
- Genus: Vexillum
- Species: †V. neozelanicum

Binomial name
- †Vexillum neozelanicum (Laws, 1939)

Synonyms
- † Costellaria neozelanica (Laws, 1939); † Uromitra neozelanica Laws, 1939

= Vexillum neozelanicum =

Extinct species of gastropod

Vexillum neozelanicum is an extinct species of sea snail, a marine gastropod mollusk, in the family Costellariidae, the ribbed miters.

== Description ==
Neozelanicum is an extinct species. The length of the shell attains 19 mm, its diameter 6 mm.

The shell contains seven whorls, lightly and evenly convex, slopingly shouldered. The suture is distinct. The whole surface is sculptured by axial costae and spiral cinguli, the former the more strongly developed, although the latter are strong enough to cause cancellation of sculpture. The number of axials varies a good deal: the holotype shows 14 axials on the penultimate whorl, a paratype with 25. There is axial acceleration over last half of body whorl. The spirals are broad, low, flat, their interstices almost linear, 7 to 8 in number on penultimate whorl, surmounting axials and causing very slight nodulation. The aperture shows certain spirals outstanding. The columella has four folds decreasing in strength anteriorly. The posterior one is horizontal and the others becoming more oblique in order towards anterior. The parietal callus is present. The outer lip is internally lirate throughout entire length, the lirae being set a little distance from edge of lip. The anterior canal is fairly long, twisted and practically no notch.

== Distribution ==
Fossils of this marine species were found in Tertiary strata at Pakaurangi Point, Kaipara Harbour, New Zealand.
