= Alvania kaawaensis =

Scientific classification
- Kingdom: Animalia
- Phylum: Mollusca
- Class: Gastropoda
- Subclass: Caenogastropoda
- Order: Littorinimorpha
- Superfamily: Rissooidea
- Family: Rissoidae
- Genus: Alvania
- Species: †A. kaawaensis

Binomial name
- †Alvania kaawaensis (Laws, 1940)

Synonyms
- † Alvania (Linemera) kaawaensis (Laws, 1940) alternate representation; † Linemera kaawaensis Laws, 1940

Species of gastropod

Alvania kaawaensis is an extinct species of minute sea snail, a marine gastropod mollusc or micromollusk in the family Rissoidae.

== Distribution ==
Fossils of this marine species were found in New Zealand
