= Proteocephalinae =

Scientific classification
- Kingdom: Animalia
- Phylum: Platyhelminthes
- Class: Cestoda
- Order: Onchoproteocephalidea
- Family: Proteocephalidae
- Subfamily: Proteocephalinae

Subfamily of flatworms

Proteocephalinae is a subfamily of tapeworms in the Proteocephalidae family, which includes the genus Ophiotaenia.
