= Turbonilla moorei =

Scientific classification
- Kingdom: Animalia
- Phylum: Mollusca
- Class: Gastropoda
- Family: Pyramidellidae
- Genus: Turbonilla
- Species: T. moorei

Binomial name
- Turbonilla moorei Laws, 1937

Species of gastropod

Turbonilla moorei is a species of sea snail, a marine gastropod mollusk in the family Pyramidellidae, the pyrams and their allies.
