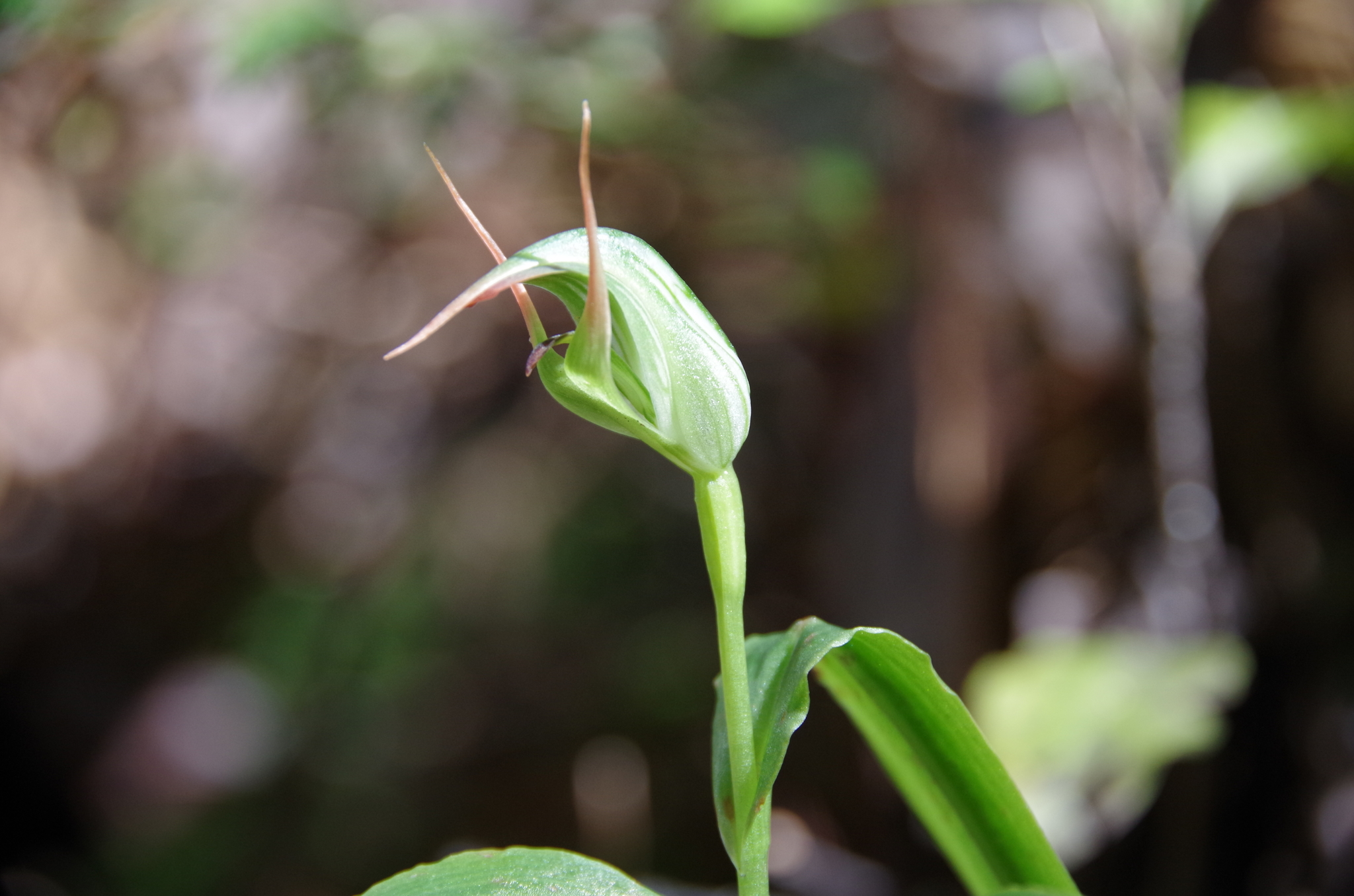

Scientific classification
- Kingdom: Plantae
- Clade: Tracheophytes
- Clade: Angiosperms
- Clade: Monocots
- Order: Asparagales
- Family: Orchidaceae
- Subfamily: Orchidoideae
- Tribe: Cranichideae
- Genus: Pterostylis
- Species: P. auriculata

Binomial name
- Pterostylis auriculata Colenso

= Pterostylis auriculata =

Greenhood

Species of orchid

Pterostylis auriculata is a species of orchid endemic to New Zealand. Unlike many other greenhood orchids, this species lacks a rosette of leaves but instead only has leaves on the flowering stem. All parts of the plant are glossy and there is a single green flower with a reddish tinge.

== Description ==
Pterostylis auriculata is a terrestrial, perennial, deciduous, herb with an underground tuber and has four glossy green leaves on the flowering stem. The leaves are lance-shaped, 125–180 mm (5–7 in) long, 10–15 mm (0.4–0.6 in) wide and the uppermost leaf is usually higher than the flower. There is a single glossy green flower with reddish tips. The dorsal sepal and petals are fused, forming a hood or "galea" over the column. The dorsal sepal is narrow egg-shaped, 15–18 mm (0.6–0.7 in) long with a sharp tip. The lateral sepals are erect, have narrow tips up to 25 mm (1 in) long and spread slightly apart from each other. The labellum is red, 10 mm (0.4 in) long, 2–5 mm (0.08–0.2 in) wide and curved with a prominent mid-rib. Flowering occurs from October to November.

== Taxonomy and naming ==
Pterostylis auriculata was first formally described in 1889 by William Colenso and the description was published in Transactions and Proceedings of the New Zealand Institute. The specific epithet means "small eared".

== Distribution and habitat ==
This greenhood grows in damp, heavily shaded forest on southern parts of South Island of New Zealand and on Chatham, Stewart and Kapiti Islands.
