= Zemacies elatior =

Zemacies elatior Temporal range: Miocene, 23.04-5.333 Ma

Scientific classification
- Kingdom: Animalia
- Phylum: Mollusca
- Class: Gastropoda
- Subclass: Caenogastropoda
- Order: Neogastropoda
- Superfamily: Conoidea
- Family: Borsoniidae
- Genus: Zemacies
- Species: †Z. elatior

Binomial name
- †Zemacies elatior Finlay, 1926

Extinct species of gastropod

Zemacies elatior is an extinct macrobenthic species of predatory sea snail, a marine gastropod mollusk in the family Borsoniidae.

== Description ==
The length of the shell attains 75 mm (plus about 5 mm. missing from apex of type); its diameter: 17 mm.

(Original description) The shell is large and very slender. The spire is high and it is as long as the aperture with the siphonal canal. The suture is distinct.

There are about 12 spiral cords below the shoulder on the whorls of the spire. The interstices are twice the width of the cords, and they contain a few finer interstitial riblets. There are numerous fine threads above the shoulder. The spirals are continued all over the body whorl and they are alternately fine and weak.

Sculpture: the axial ribs are confined to the early whorls, numbering about 20 per whorl. They appear only as elongate, forwardly-sloping nodules on the keel and vanish halfway to the lower suture. The lower whorls are only irregularly corrugated and roughened by growth-lines.

A low, thin, sharp cord margins a small, subsutural, straight, and sloping platforml. Below this sthe houlder is concave. The whorls then have a blunt supra-medial keel, and they slope slightly in to the lower suture.

The aperture is long and narrow. The outer lip swings out far past its origin at the suture. The sinus is very deep and narrowly rounded, with its apex at the center of the concave shoulder. The columella is oblique but quite straight, very long, and regularly tapering, with no trace of folds. The siphonal canal is not notched, and its base is spout-like.

== Distribution ==
This extinct marine species was endemic to New Zealand and was found in Miocene strata.
