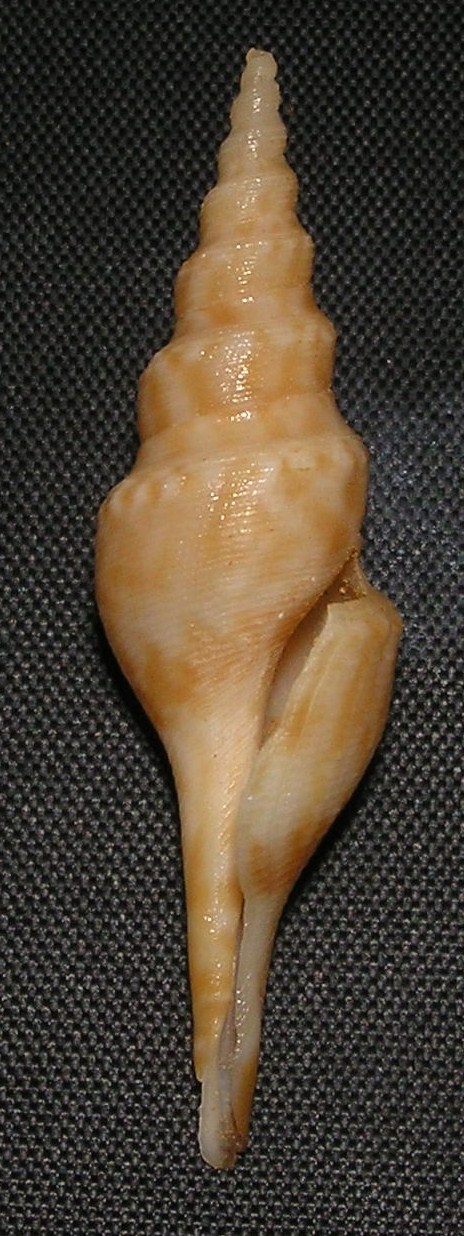
- Shell of Zemacies queenslandica

Scientific classification
- Kingdom: Animalia
- Phylum: Mollusca
- Class: Gastropoda
- Subclass: Caenogastropoda
- Order: Neogastropoda
- Superfamily: Conoidea
- Family: Borsoniidae
- Genus: Zemacies
- Species: Z. queenslandica

Binomial name
- Zemacies queenslandica (Powell, 1969)

Synonyms
- Leucosyrinx queenslandica Powell, 1969; Turris queenslandis A.W.B. Powell, 1969

= Zemacies queenslandica =

Species of gastropod

Zemacies queenslandica, commonly known as the Queensland turrid, is a species of sea snail, a marine gastropod mollusk belonging to the family Borsoniidae.

== Description ==
The size of an adult shell varies between 45 mm and 60 mm.

== Distribution ==
This marine species occurs off Southern Queensland, Australia and the Gulf of Papua.
