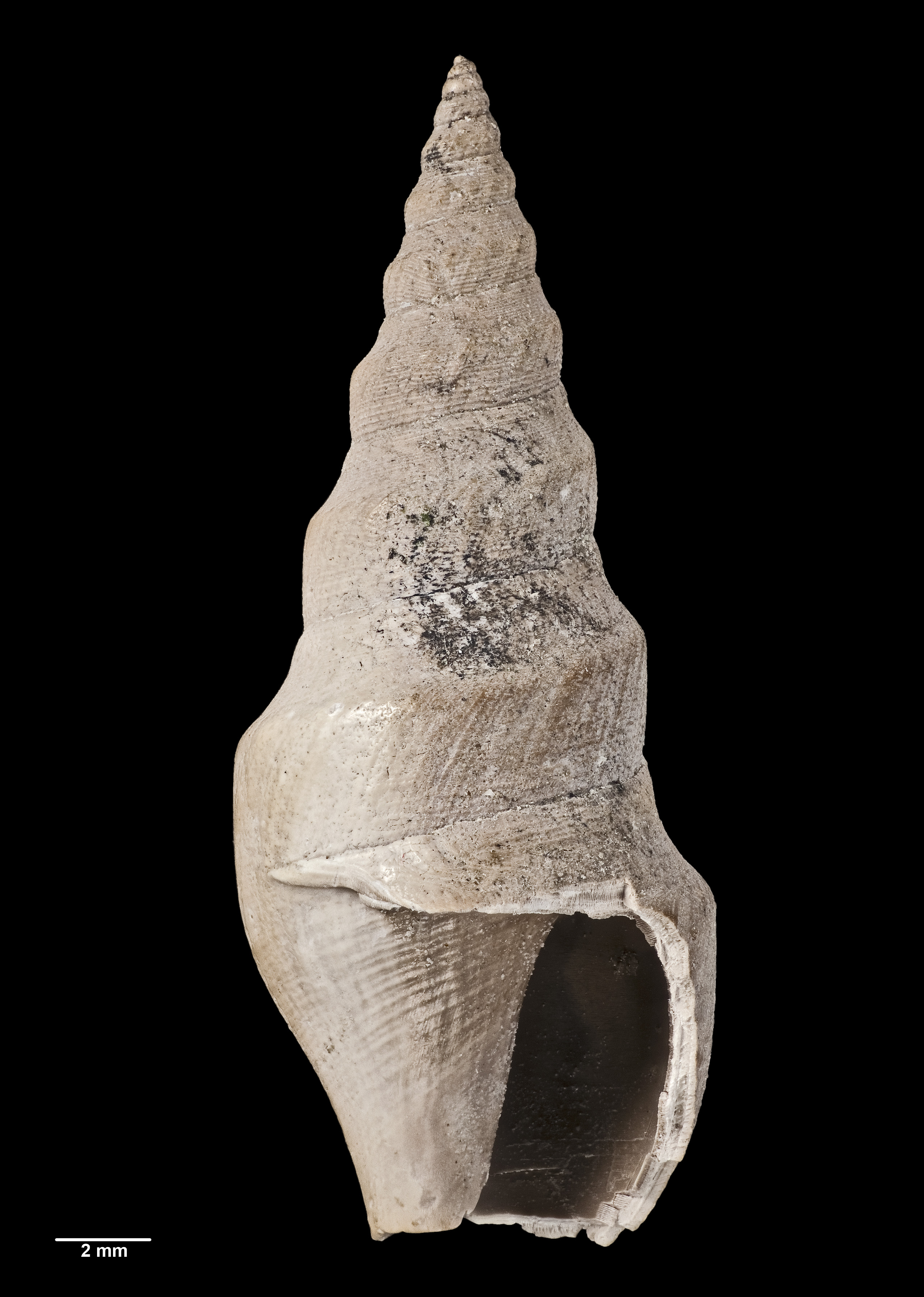
- Holotype from Auckland War Memorial Museum

Scientific classification
- Kingdom: Animalia
- Phylum: Mollusca
- Class: Gastropoda
- Subclass: Caenogastropoda
- Order: Neogastropoda
- Family: Borsoniidae
- Genus: Zemacies
- Species: †Z. inexpectata

Binomial name
- †Zemacies inexpectata Powell, 1944

= Zemacies inexpectata =

Zemacies inexpectata Temporal range: late Oligocene–Early Miocene

Extinct species of gastropod

Zemacies inexpectata is an extinct species of sea snail, a marine gastropod mollusc in the family Borsoniidae. Fossils of the species have been found in strata of the Port Phillip Basin of Victoria, Australia, and date to either late Oligocene or the early Miocene.

== Description ==
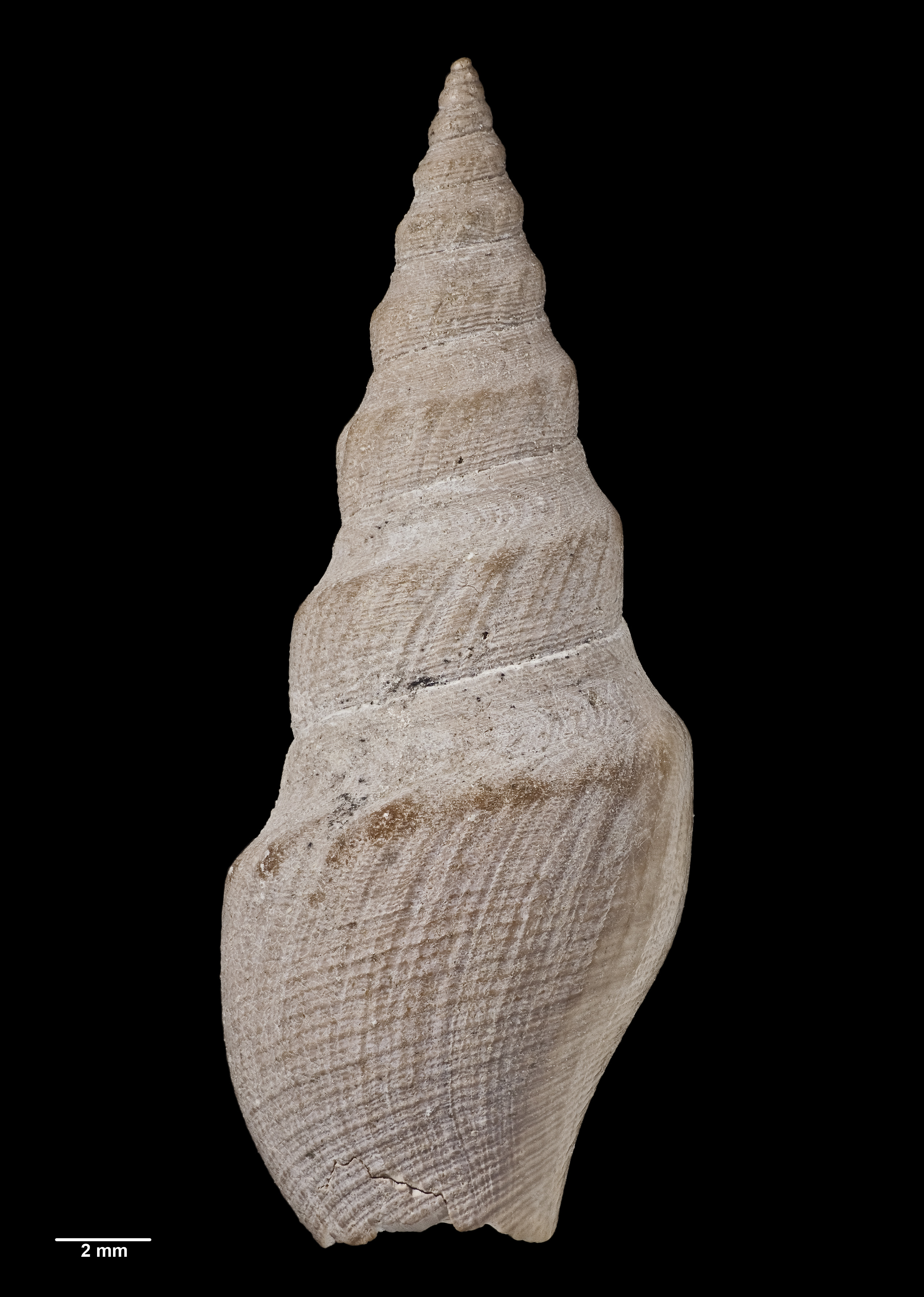
Reverse view of holotype

In the original description, Powell described the species as follows:

Shell superficially similar to bassi, slender, with loosely coiled whorls, but finer spiral sculpture and absence of axials. Regular rest periods give the appearance of flexuous obsolescent axial folds, apparent only on the carina of the later whorls. Whorls distinctly angled just above the middle. Suture faintly but rather broadly submargined. Spire-whorls with 4 to 5 weak, closely spaced threads on the subsutural band, rest of shoulder with microscopic dense striations, and 12-22 weak, closely spaced threads from the periphery to the lower suture. Body-whorl incomplete in sole example. The protoconch is typical, tall, narrowly conic, of 4 smooth whorls, with a tiny apex.

The holotype of the species measures 24.2 mm (0.95 in) in height and 30 mm (1.2 in) in diameter.

== Taxonomy ==
The species was first described by A.W.B. Powell in 1944. The holotype was collected from Torquay, Victoria, Australia at an unknown date earlier than 1944, and is held by the Auckland War Memorial Museum.

== Distribution ==
This extinct marine species occurs in the strata of the Port Phillip Basin, and was either found in the late Oligocene Jan Juc Formation or the early Miocene Puebla Formation in Victoria, Australia.
