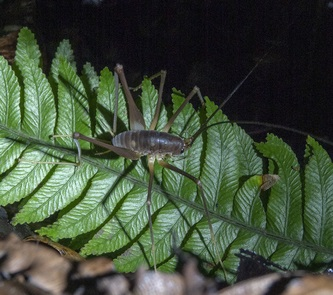
- Macropathus filifer

Scientific classification
- Kingdom: Animalia
- Phylum: Arthropoda
- Clade: Pancrustacea
- Class: Insecta
- Order: Orthoptera
- Suborder: Ensifera
- Family: Rhaphidophoridae
- Tribe: Macropathini
- Genus: Macropathus; Walker, 1869

Species
- See text

= Macropathus =

Genus of orthopteran insects

Macropathus is a genus of cave wētā in the family Rhaphidophoridae, endemic to New Zealand.

== Distribution and habitat ==
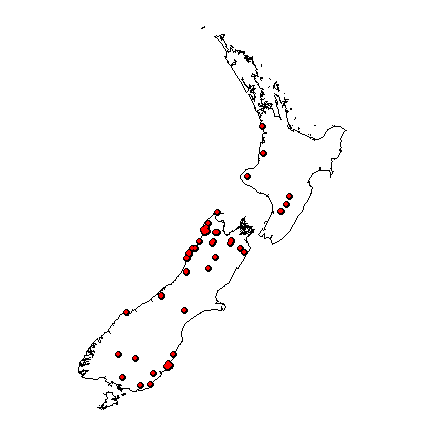
Macropathus sightings in New Zealand as of October 2022. Data from iNaturalist NZ.

Macropathus are only found in New Zealand, and can be found in both the North Island and the South Island. There are yet to be any observations on the offshore islands. They live in caves, and in the open, under rocks.

== Threats ==
Macropathus face the same threats as most species of wētā, predation by introduced species, and habitat destruction by humans.

== Species ==
This genus was revised a number of times before Aola Richards examined the type material from the British Museum of Natural History (London) and clarified how if differs from the genus Pachyrhamma. Genetic data suggests that Macropathus filifer is sister to New Zealand and Tasmanian and Falkland Island species.

- Macropathus filifer Walker, 1869
- Macropathus huttoni Kirby, 1906
