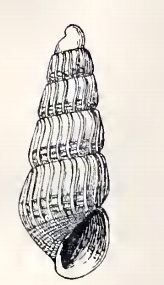
- Apertural view of the shell of Besla convexa

Scientific classification
- Kingdom: Animalia
- Phylum: Mollusca
- Class: Gastropoda
- Subcohort: Panpulmonata
- Superfamily: Pyramidelloidea
- Family: Pyramidellidae
- Genus: Besla; Dall & Bartsch, 1904

Type species
- Odostomia convexa Carpenter, 1857

= Besla =

Genus of gastropods

Besla is a small genus of miniature sea snails, pyramidellid gastropod mollusks in the family Pyramidellidae within the tribe Chrysallidini (sensu taxonomy by Bouchet & Roctroi, 2005).

== Taxonomy ==
The synonymy of Parthenina (Bucquoy, Dautzenberg & Dolfus, 1883) with Besla (Doll & Bartsch, 1904) proposed by Micali et al., (2012) is debatable. The type species of Besla has a protoconch axis at 90° with that of teleoconch (Type A protoconch), whereas that of Parthenina is tilted at nearly 180° (Type C); therefore, these divergent characteristics suggest that Besla and Parthenina are unrelated and that their teleoconch sculpture may be convergent.

== Life habits ==
Very little is known about the biology of the members of this genus. As is true of most members of the Pyramidellidae sensu lato, they are most likely to be ectoparasites.

== Species ==
There are more than twenty known species within the genus Besla, these include:

- Besla alphonsi (Saurin, 1959)
- Besla annae (Saurin, 1959)
- Besla arenarum (Saurin, 1959)
- Besla articulata (Hedley, 1909)
- Besla augusti (Saurin, 1959)
- Besla bicinctella (Yokoyama, 1927)
- Besla canaensis (Saurin, 1959)
- Besla convexa (Carpenter, 1857) - type species as: Odostomia (Chrysallida) convexa
- Besla cossmanni (Hornung & Mermod, 1924)
- Besla danieli (Saurin, 1959)
- Besla dheeradiloki (Robba, Di Geronimo, Chaimanee, Negri & Sanfilippo, 2003)
- Besla excolpa (Bartsch, 1912)
- Besla gabriellae (Saurin, 1959)
- Besla gautieri (Saurin, 1959)
- Besla henriettae (Saurin, 1959)
- Besla insularis (Oliver, 1915)
- Besla joae (Saurin, 1961)
- † Besla lawsi (Grant-Mackie & Chapman-Smith, 1971)
- Besla mieuina (Saurin, 1959)
- † Besla otahua (Laws, 1950)
- Besla ranae (Saurin, 1961)
- Besla reamensis (Saurin, 1961)
- Besla revisa (Saurin, 1959)
- Besla rossiana (Laws, 1941)
- Besla subrugata (Powell, 1927)
- Besla tuytrieuensis (Saurin, 1959)
- Besla vaga (Laws, 1941)
- Besla waitangiensis (Laws, 1941)
