= Besla articulata =

Scientific classification
- Kingdom: Animalia
- Phylum: Mollusca
- Class: Gastropoda
- Family: Pyramidellidae
- Genus: Besla
- Species: B. articulata

Binomial name
- Besla articulata Hedley, 1909

Species of gastropod

Besla articulata is a species of sea snail, a marine gastropod mollusc in the family Pyramidellidae, the pyrams and their allies. The species is one of twelve known species within the Besla genus of gastropods.
