= Ophiotaenia ranae =

Scientific classification
- Kingdom: Animalia
- Phylum: Platyhelminthes
- Class: Cestoda
- Order: Onchoproteocephalidea
- Family: Proteocephalidae
- Genus: Ophiotaenia
- Species: O. ranae

Binomial name
- Ophiotaenia ranae Yamaguti, 1938

Species of tapeworm

Ophiotaenia ranae is a tapeworm from Japan. It is parasite of the frog Rana nigromaculata.
