= Besla reamensis =

Scientific classification
- Kingdom: Animalia
- Phylum: Mollusca
- Class: Gastropoda
- Family: Pyramidellidae
- Genus: Besla
- Species: B. reamensis

Binomial name
- Besla reamensis Saurin, 1961

Species of gastropod

Besla reamensis is a species of sea snail, a marine gastropod mollusk in the family Pyramidellidae, the pyrams and their allies. The species is one of twelve known within the genus Besla.
