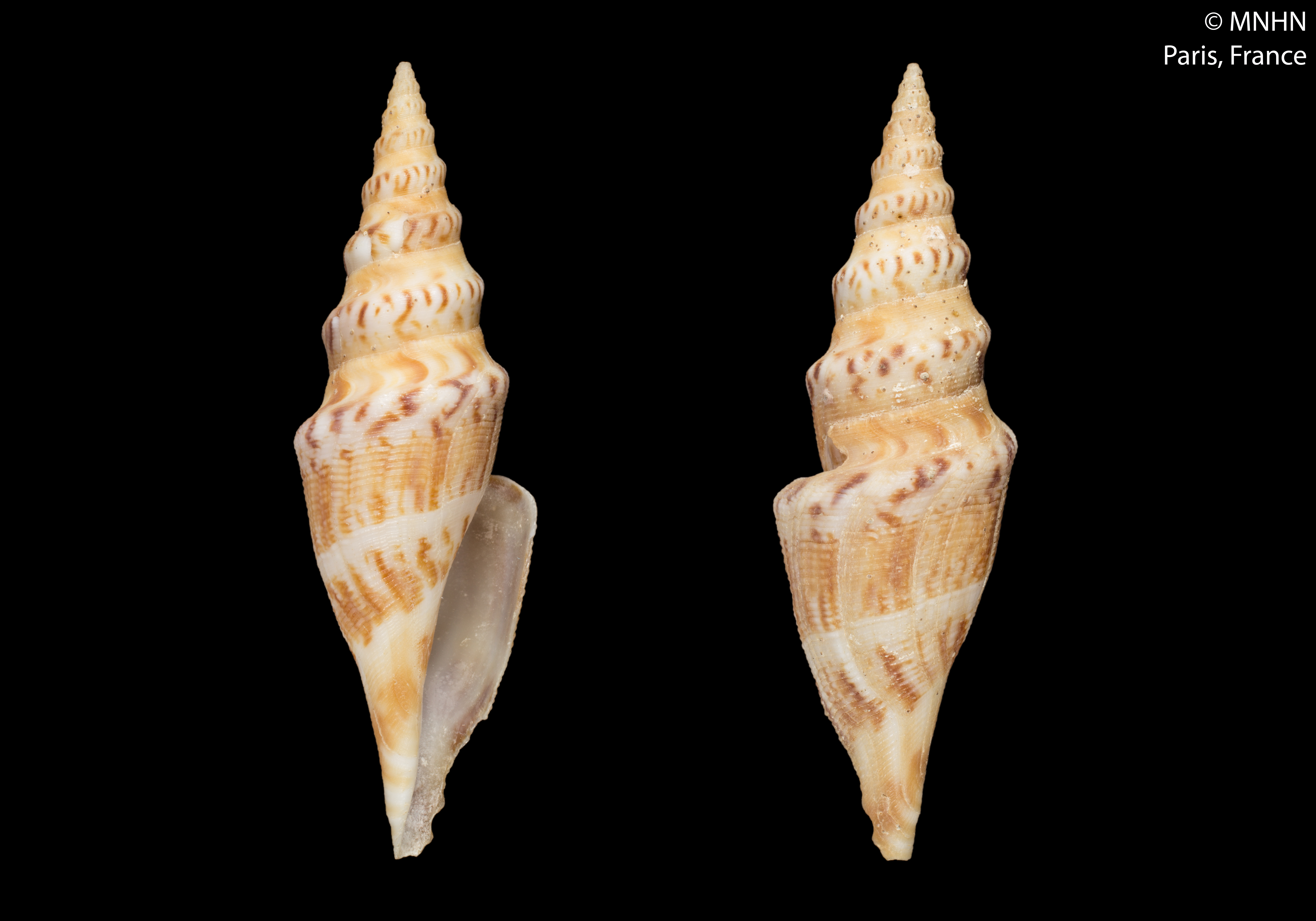

Scientific classification
- Kingdom: Animalia
- Phylum: Mollusca
- Class: Gastropoda
- Subclass: Caenogastropoda
- Order: Neogastropoda
- Superfamily: Conoidea
- Family: Borsoniidae
- Genus: Zemacies
- Species: Z. excelsa

Binomial name
- Zemacies excelsa Sysoev & Bouchet, 2001

= Zemacies excelsa =

Species of sea snail

Zemacies excelsa is a species of sea snail, a marine gastropod mollusk in the family Borsoniidae.

== Description ==
The shell grows to a length of 55 mm. Individuals can grow to 58.2mm and can have a wet body mass of 24.5g. Dead Zemacies excelsa form shallow marine sediments. Unlike most of its close relatives in the Conoidea superfamily, Z. excelsa lacks a radula and venom apparatus.

Zemacies excelsa has a dextrally coiled body symmetry.

== Distribution ==
This species occurs in the Pacific Ocean off New Caledonia and New Zealand. Most are found approximately 200-300 meters deep in the ocean, with some down to 600-700 meters deep.
