= Besla dheeradiloki =

Scientific classification
- Kingdom: Animalia
- Phylum: Mollusca
- Class: Gastropoda
- Family: Pyramidellidae
- Genus: Besla
- Species: B. dheeradiloki

Binomial name
- Besla dheeradiloki Robba, Di Geronimo, Chaimanee, Negri & Sanfilippo, 2004

Species of gastropod

Besla dheeradiloki is a species of sea snail, a marine gastropod mollusk in the family Pyramidellidae, the pyrams and their allies. The species is one of twelve known species within the Besla genus of gastropods.

== Distribution ==
The species notably inhabits marine terrains throughout the northern Gulf of Thailand area.
