= Besla subrugata =

Scientific classification
- Kingdom: Animalia
- Phylum: Mollusca
- Class: Gastropoda
- Family: Pyramidellidae
- Genus: Besla
- Species: B. subrugata

Binomial name
- Besla subrugata (Powell, 1927)

Species of gastropod

Besla subrugata is a species of sea snail, a marine gastropod mollusk in the family Pyramidellidae, the pyrams and their allies. The species is one of twelve known species within the Besla genus of gastropods.

== Distribution ==
This marine species is distributed throughout marine terrain off the coasts of New Zealand, within the New Zealand Exclusive Economic Zone.
