= Prosobothrium =

Scientific classification
- Kingdom: Animalia
- Phylum: Platyhelminthes
- Class: Cestoda
- Order: Onchoproteocephalidea
- Family: Prosobothriidae; Baer & Euzet, 1955
- Genus: Prosobothrium; Cohn, 1902

Synonyms
- Ichthyotaenia Linton, 1924; Lintonella Fuhrmann, 1930; Lintoniella Woodland, 1927

Genus of flatworms

Prosobothrium is a genus of flatworms belonging to the monotypic family Prosobothriidae.

Species:

- Prosobothrium adherens (Linton, 1924) Riser, 1955
- Prosobothrium armigerum Cohn, 1902
- Prosobothrium japonicum Yamaguti, 1934
