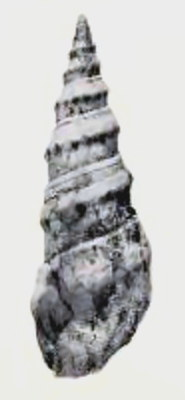
- Shell of the extinct species Zemacies marginalis

Scientific classification
- Kingdom: Animalia
- Phylum: Mollusca
- Class: Gastropoda
- Subclass: Caenogastropoda
- Order: Neogastropoda
- Superfamily: Conoidea
- Family: Borsoniidae
- Genus: Zemacies; Finlay, 1926

Type species
- † Zemacies elatior Finlay, H.J., 1926

= Zemacies =

Genus of gastropods

Zemacies is a genus of sea snails, marine gastropod mollusks in the family Borsoniidae.

Most species in this genus are extinct. Their age range is 55.8 to 11.608 Ma.

== Species ==
Species within the genus Zemacies include:

- † Zemacies armata Powell, 1942
- † Zemacies awakinoensis Powell, 1942
- † Zemacies climacota (Suter, 1917)
- † Zemacies conspicua (May, 1922)
- † Zemacies elatior Finlay, 1926
- Zemacies excelsa Sysoev & Bouchet, 2001
- † Zemacies finlayi Stilwell & Zinsmeister, 1992
- † Zemacies hamiltoni (Hutton, 1905)
- † Zemacies immatura Finlay & Marwick, 1937
- † Zemacies inexpectata Powell, 1944
- † Zemacies laciniata (Suter, 1917)
- † Zemacies lividorupis Laws, 1935
- † Zemacies marginalis (P. Marshall, 1919)
- † Zemacies ordinaria (P. Marshall, 1918)
- † Zemacies prendrevillei Marwick, 1928
- † Zemacies procerior Darragh, 1997
- Zemacies queenslandica (Powell, 1969)
- † Zemacies simulacrum Laws, 1935
- † Zemacies torticostata (P. Marshall, 1919)

Synonyms

- † Zemacies canalomos Stilwell & Zinsmeister, 1992: synonym of † Aforia canalomos (Stilwell & Zinsmeister, 1992)
