= Besla insularis =

Scientific classification
- Kingdom: Animalia
- Phylum: Mollusca
- Class: Gastropoda
- Family: Pyramidellidae
- Genus: Besla
- Species: B. insularis

Binomial name
- Besla insularis (Oliver, 1915)

Species of gastropod

Besla insularis is a species of sea snail, a marine gastropod mollusk in the family Pyramidellidae, the pyrams and their allies. The species is one of twelve known species within the Besla genus of gastropods.

== Distribution ==
This marine species has only ever been known to inhabit marine terrain throughout the coasts of New Zealand and other surrounding minor islands.
