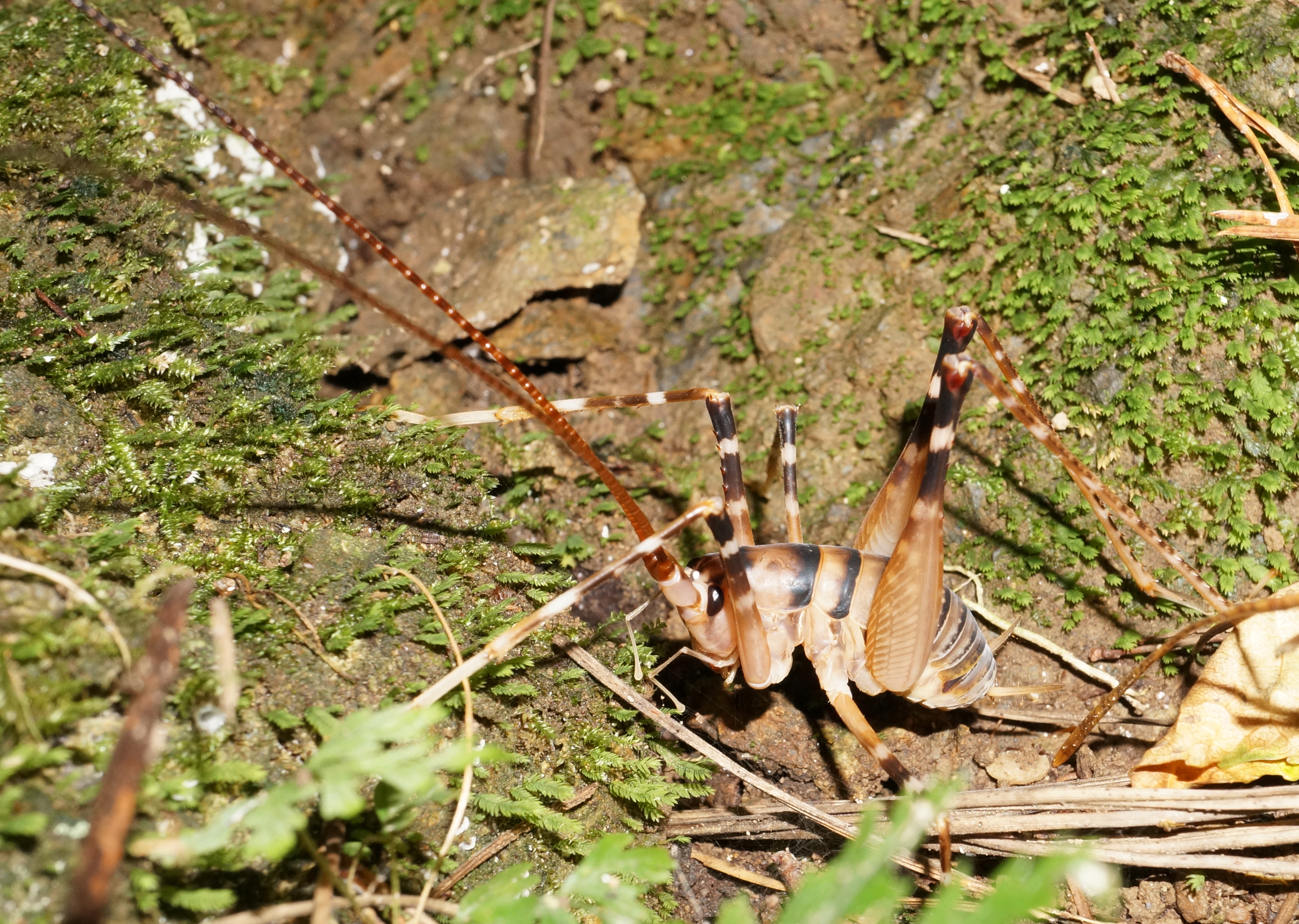
- Pachyrhamma edwardsii (male)

Scientific classification
- Kingdom: Animalia
- Phylum: Arthropoda
- Class: Insecta
- Order: Orthoptera
- Suborder: Ensifera
- Family: Rhaphidophoridae
- Genus: Pachyrhamma
- Species: P. edwardsii

Binomial name
- Pachyrhamma edwardsii (Scudder, 1869)

Synonyms
- Gymnoplectron edwardsii; Macropathus filifer

= Pachyrhamma edwardsii =

Species of orthopteran insect

Pachyrhamma edwardsii is a species of wētā, in the family Rhaphidophoridae (cave crickets, cave wētā, or camel crickets), endemic to New Zealand. This species is found in caves, or large cavities (cave-like structures) where there is high humidity and little plant or animal life.

== Habitats and distribution ==
Pachyrhamma edwardsii is widespread in central New Zealand from Waikato, North Island to Nelson, South Island. It is a common occupant of anthropogenic rock tunnels and limestone caves and is found in forests and stony stream beds. It also inhabits offshore Islands of Marlborough sounds, and Mana and Kapiti Islands near Wellington. This species can be found at night in forests, and near cave entrances. They belong to a moisture-loving group of insects, and prefer cool temperatures, and high humidity.

== Morphology ==
Small bodies up to about 41mm (Average 35mm) length. Very long hind legs (leg: body ratio = 3.17:1), antennae (4.5-5 x body length), and ovipositor (7-8 x body length). Head is vertical and mandibles are small. Sexual dimorphic antennae where males possess longer and stouter antennae than females. Body sparsely clothed with golden setae. Adults are brown with dark or nearly black distinctive bands across posterior margins of their abdominal segments. Antennae medium brown and ovipositor deep reddish-brown.

== Ecology and behaviour ==
Pachyrhamma edwardsii are flightless and nocturnal. Their long antennae are used to navigate in the dark. During the daytime, they remain motionless on cave walls, inside hollow logs, or under stones, and are active only at night. This cave wētā eats a wide range of plants, fungi, lichens, and scavengers on animal material. Pachyrhamma edwardsii are parasitized by gordian worms and intracellular bacteria. Their long slender legs are used to walk, climb trees in search of food, and jump off for safety. Although they aggregate in caves, they do not have a social life and have solitary habits and behaviours. A colony of them consists of mature males and females and dozens of juveniles. Small mouth parts of cave wētā are not used for defense. Their bite is harmless, and they seldom attempt to bite. Hind legs possess numerous spines, though they are too small to make a painful scratch. Secretion of brown or white fluid from mouth or anus consider as a defense mechanism. Pachyrhamma edwardsii are frequently seen cleaning themselves. They have a complicated and long process of nibbling along legs, body and antennae. This cleaning process helps them to remove dust particles and keep the antennae and setae on the legs sensitive to environmental changes. Cannibalism is quite common during mating season when opposite sex attack each other. Cannibalism may also occur just after moulting (ecdysis).

== Reproduction ==
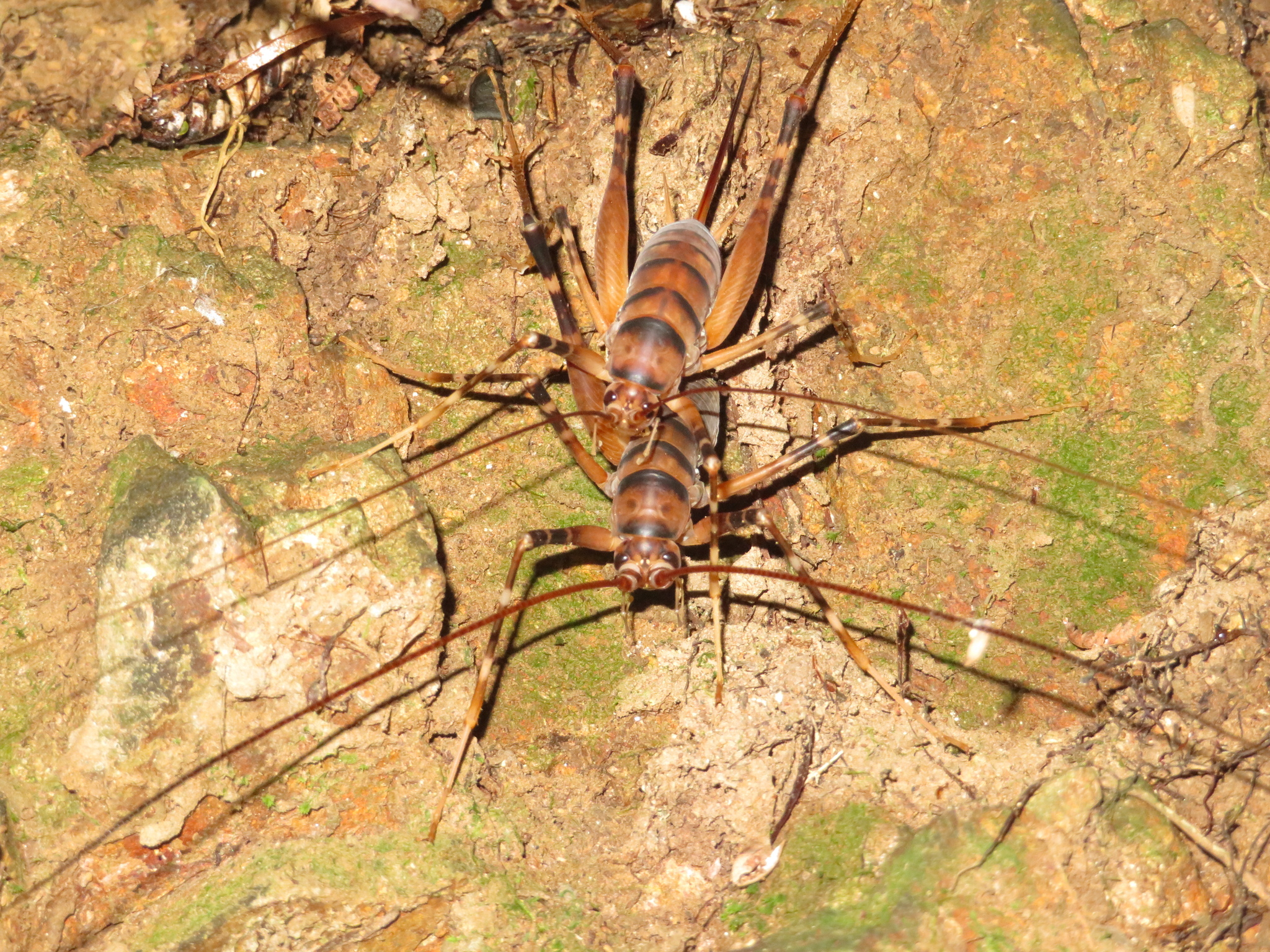
Pair of adult Pachyrhamma edwardsii on cave wall

In copulation, female superior and male go underneath. Female has a long ovipositor for laying eggs into soil and walls of caves. The eggs are probable parasitized by endemic wasps Archaeoteleia spp. After copulation females groom their ovipositor and antennae. The gestation period of the eggs is unknown. The nymph (first instar) of Pachyrhamma edwardsii is the size of a rice-grain, just after hatching from its egg. They are light brown, orange, and beige colour. Their long slender legs show its beginning of adult colouration.
