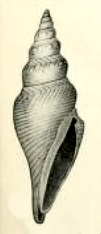
- Shell of Zemacies conspicua (holotype)

Scientific classification
- Kingdom: Animalia
- Phylum: Mollusca
- Class: Gastropoda
- Subclass: Caenogastropoda
- Order: Neogastropoda
- Superfamily: Conoidea
- Family: Borsoniidae
- Genus: Zemacies
- Species: †Z. conspicua

Binomial name
- †Zemacies conspicua (May, 1922)

Synonyms
- † Turris conspicua May, 1922

= Zemacies conspicua =

Extinct species of gastropod

Zemacies conspicua is an extinct species of sea snail, a marine gastropod mollusk in the family Borsoniidae.

== Description ==
The length of the shell attains 83 mm, its diameter 24 mm.

(Original description) The very large shell is fusiform. The spire and the aperture are about equal. It contains about eight rounded whorls . The suture is impressed. The aperture is narrow. The sculpture indicates a fairly deep sinus immediately below the suture. The upper whorls are faintly coronate at the angle, and ridged by lines of growth and are concentrically finely lirate all over.

== Distribution ==
This extinct marine species is endemic to Tasmania and were found in Tertiary strata.
