= Charles Henry Laws =

New Zealand Methodist minister and administrator

Charles Henry Laws (21 January 1867 – 8 February 1958) was a New Zealand Methodist minister and administrator. He was born in Newcastle upon Tyne, Northumberland, England, on 21 January 1867. Laws studied geology at Auckland University College in the 1890s.

Laws' son was geologist and malacologist Charles Reed Laws.
