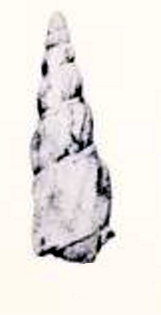
- Original image of a shell of Zemacies torticostata

Scientific classification
- Kingdom: Animalia
- Phylum: Mollusca
- Class: Gastropoda
- Subclass: Caenogastropoda
- Order: Neogastropoda
- Superfamily: Conoidea
- Family: Borsoniidae
- Genus: Zemacies
- Species: Z. torticostata

Binomial name
- Zemacies torticostata (P. Marshall, 1919)

Synonyms
- Surcula torticostata Marshall, 1919

= Zemacies torticostata =

Extinct species of gastropod

Zemacies torticostata is an extinct species of sea snail, a marine gastropod mollusk in the family Borsoniidae.

== Description ==
The length of the shell attains 13 mm, its width 4 mm.

(Original description) The specimens of this small shell are quite imperfect; The spire is long and slender and contains six convex whorls, showing in the best specimen. The suture is impressed with a well-marked border anteriorly. The whorls show eighteen radial ridges, which extend from suture to suture and are strongly twisted forward at the anterior end. A series of very fine spiral striae covers all parts of the whorls. The aperture is not preserved in any of the specimens, but the fairly distinct growth lines show that the anal notch was broad and rounded.

== Distribution ==
This extinct marine species is endemic to New Zealand and was found in Middle Eocene strata.
