= Zemacies armata =

Scientific classification
- Kingdom: Animalia
- Phylum: Mollusca
- Class: Gastropoda
- Subclass: Caenogastropoda
- Order: Neogastropoda
- Superfamily: Conoidea
- Family: Borsoniidae
- Genus: Zemacies
- Species: Z. armata

Binomial name
- Zemacies armata Powell, 1942

Species of gastropod

Zemacies armata is an extinct species of sea snail, a marine gastropod mollusk in the family Borsoniidae.

== Distribution ==
This extinct marine species is endemic to New Zealand and was found in Middle Eocene strata.
