= Zemacies ordinaria =

Scientific classification
- Kingdom: Animalia
- Phylum: Mollusca
- Class: Gastropoda
- Subclass: Caenogastropoda
- Order: Neogastropoda
- Superfamily: Conoidea
- Family: Borsoniidae
- Genus: Zemacies
- Species: Z. ordinaria

Binomial name
- Zemacies ordinaria (P. Marshall, 1918)

Synonyms
- Surcula ordinaria Marshall, 1918

Extinct species of gastropod

Zemacies ordinaria is an extinct species of sea snail, a marine gastropod mollusk in the family Borsoniidae.

== Description ==
The whorls increase rapidly in size on this very narrow shell. The nodular axials are more or less restricted to the periphery. The subsutural fold is obsolete. There are 21–22 strong nodules per whorl.

== Distribution ==
This extinct marine species is endemic to New Zealand and was found in Lower Miocene strata.
