= Besla ranae =

Scientific classification
- Kingdom: Animalia
- Phylum: Mollusca
- Class: Gastropoda
- Family: Pyramidellidae
- Genus: Besla
- Species: B. ranae

Binomial name
- Besla ranae Saurin, 1961

Species of gastropod

Besla ranae is a species of sea snail, a marine gastropod mollusk in the family Pyramidellidae, the pyrams and their allies. The species is one of twelve known species within the Besla genus of gastropods.
