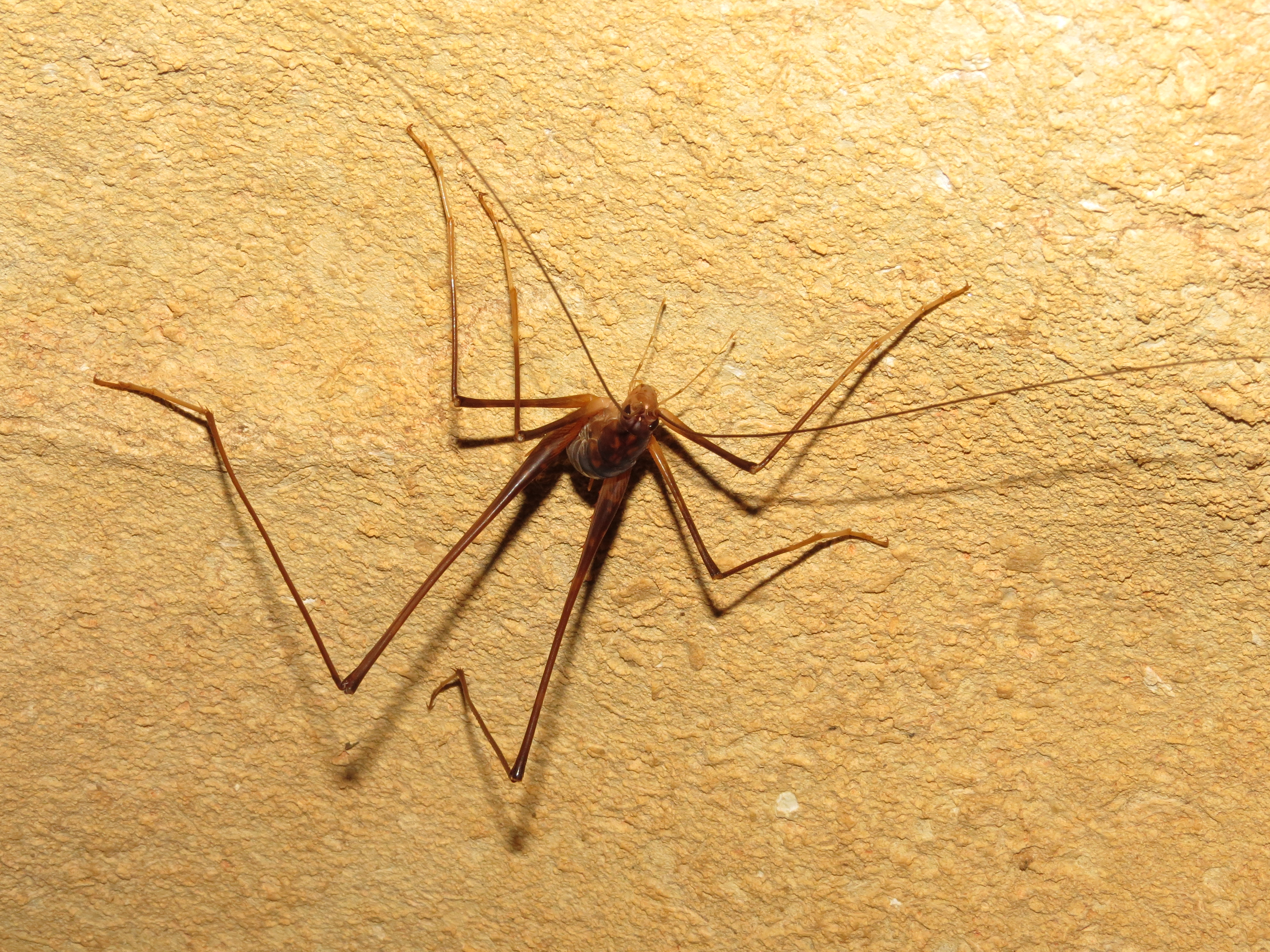
- An adult male P. waitomoensis on a cave wall in Mangahopue cave, Waitomo

Scientific classification
- Domain: Eukaryota
- Kingdom: Animalia
- Phylum: Arthropoda
- Class: Insecta
- Order: Orthoptera
- Suborder: Ensifera
- Family: Rhaphidophoridae
- Genus: Pachyrhamma
- Species: P. waitomoensis

Binomial name
- Pachyrhamma waitomoensis Richards, 1958

= Pachyrhamma waitomoensis =

Species of orthopteran insect

Pachyrhamma waitomoensis, known as the Waitomo cave weta, is a large species of cave weta (New Zealand cave cricket, tokoriro), native to the Waitomo district of New Zealand.

This species was described by Aola Richards whose doctoral research investigated their life history. Cook et al (2010) follow W.F. Kirby (1906) and Karny (1937) in treating Pachyrhamma as a neuter noun, and thus use a neuter suffix for the species name, i.e. waitomoense rather than waitomoensis.

== Ecology and natural history ==
P. waitomoensis form aggregations near the entrances of caves during daytime, often in crevices or among stalactites. The juveniles are quite inactive during daylight, generally remaining still unless disturbed. Adults form pairs which mate repeatedly throughout the day, often breaking up and reforming in different combinations. Females leave the aggregations to lay their eggs, which they do by piercing their ovipositor into soft clay on ledges and in crevices within the cave. After being laid the eggs take about eight months to hatch.

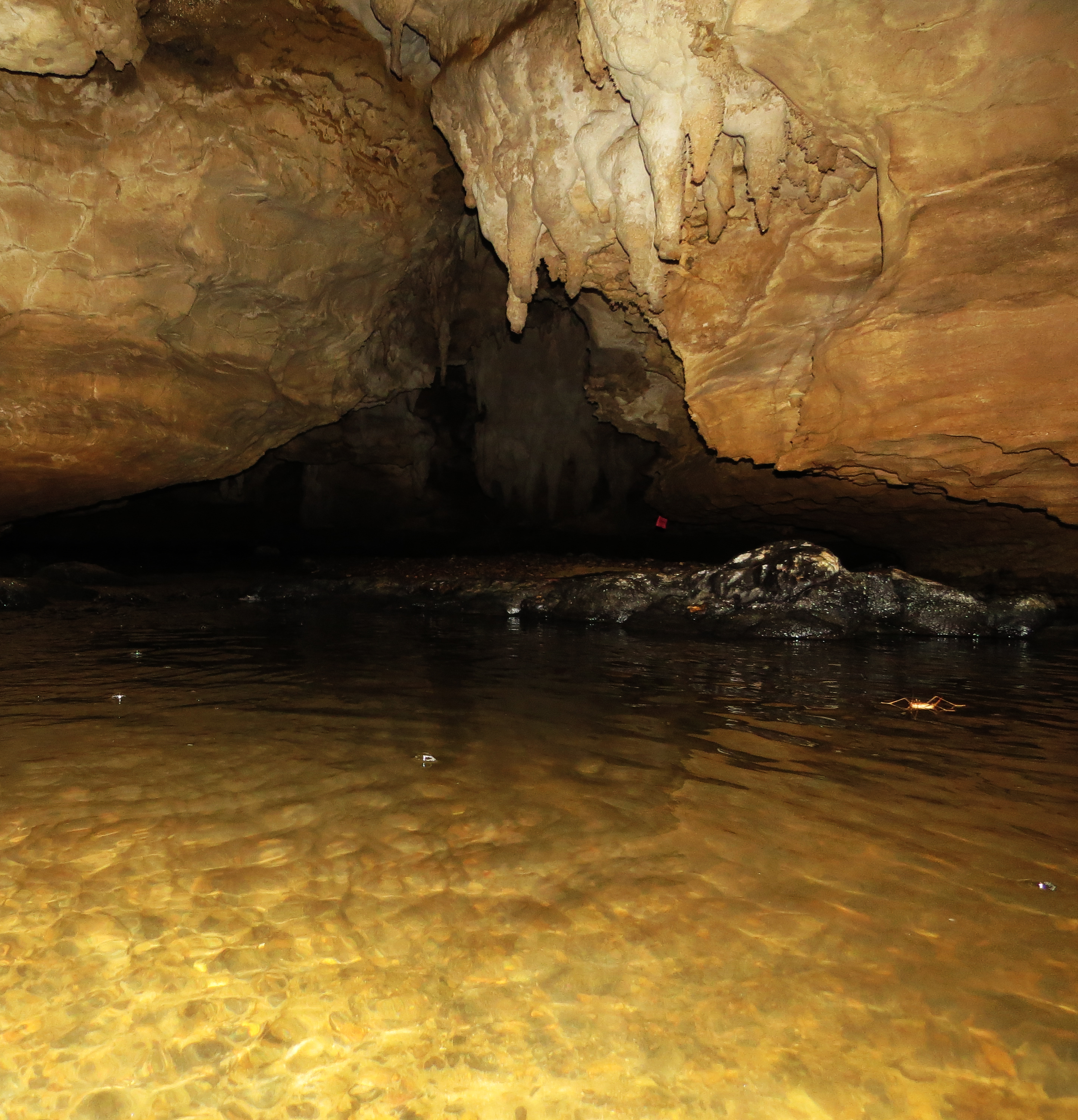
P. waitomoensis treading across a stream surface in Waitomo.

At dusk the weta emerge from the cave, seeming more likely to do so when conditions outside are darker (less moonlight) and wetter. Outside of caves the weta scavenge on and amongst plants, searching for plant, animal and fungal material to eat.

The complete life cycle from hatching to death takes approximately two years. Adults are present year-round, but most abundant from late summer to early winter. Many caves inhabited by P. waitomoensis are solutional limestone karst, with active waterways flowing through them. The weta are adept at navigating within this environment and can even tread across the surface of water without sinking.
