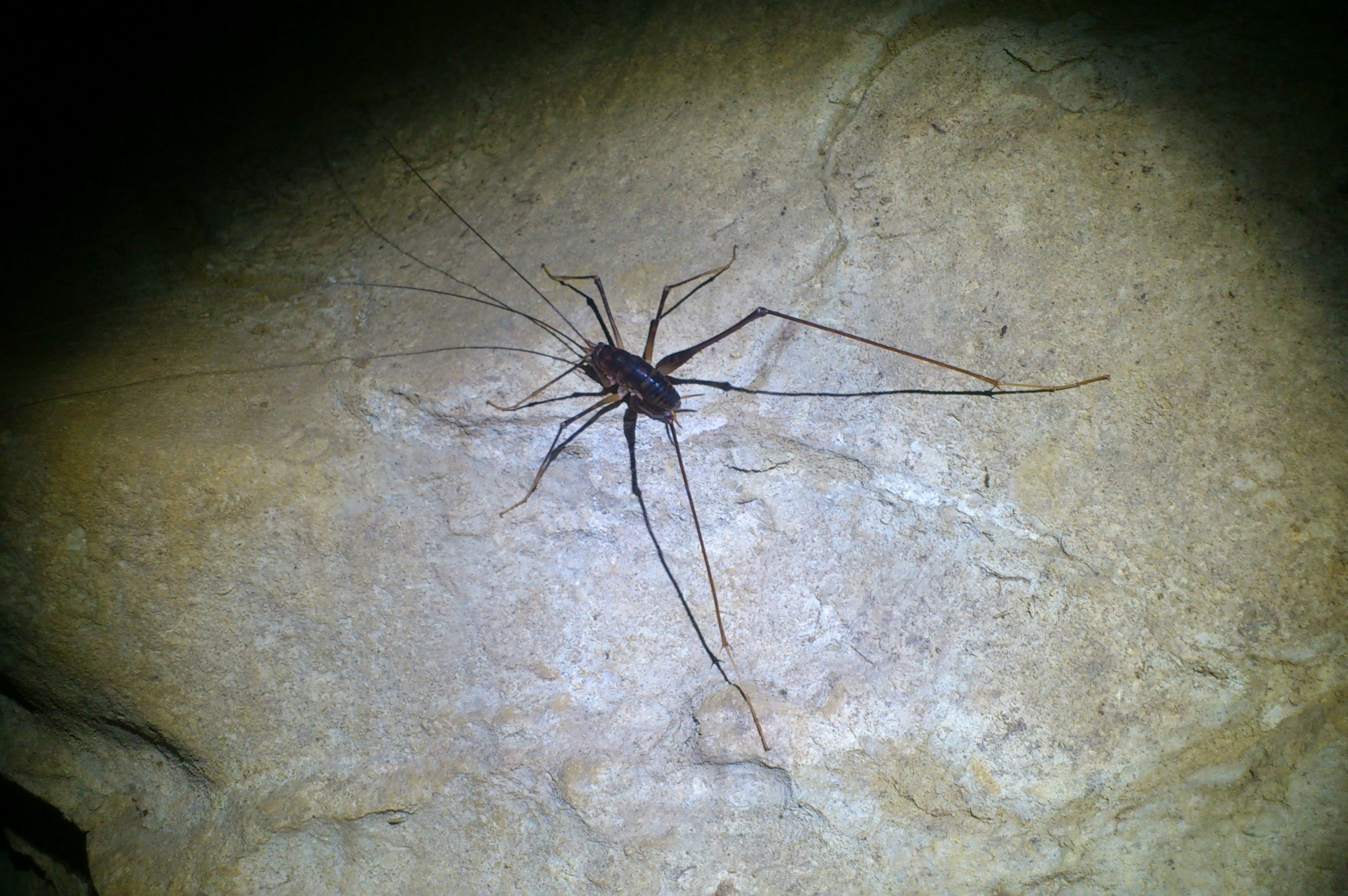

Scientific classification
- Kingdom: Animalia
- Phylum: Arthropoda
- Clade: Pancrustacea
- Class: Insecta
- Order: Orthoptera
- Suborder: Ensifera
- Family: Rhaphidophoridae
- Subfamily: Macropathinae
- Genus: Pachyrhamma; Brunner von Wattenwyl, 1888

Species
- See text

Synonyms
- Gymnoplectron Hutton, 1897; Turbottoplectron Salmon, 1948

= Pachyrhamma =

Genus of orthopteran insects

Pachyrhamma is a genus of cave wētā (New Zealand cave cricket, tokoriro) in the family Rhaphidophoridae, endemic to New Zealand. All species are nocturnal and most use cave habitats.

== Taxonomy ==
The genus was first described by Swiss geologist and entomologist Carl Brunner von Wattenwyl in 1888. Cook et al. (2010) found that Gymnoplectron and Turbottoplectron are synonymised with Pachyrhamma. They follow W.F. Kirby (1906) and Karny (1937) in treating Pachyrhamma as a neuter noun.

== Ecology ==
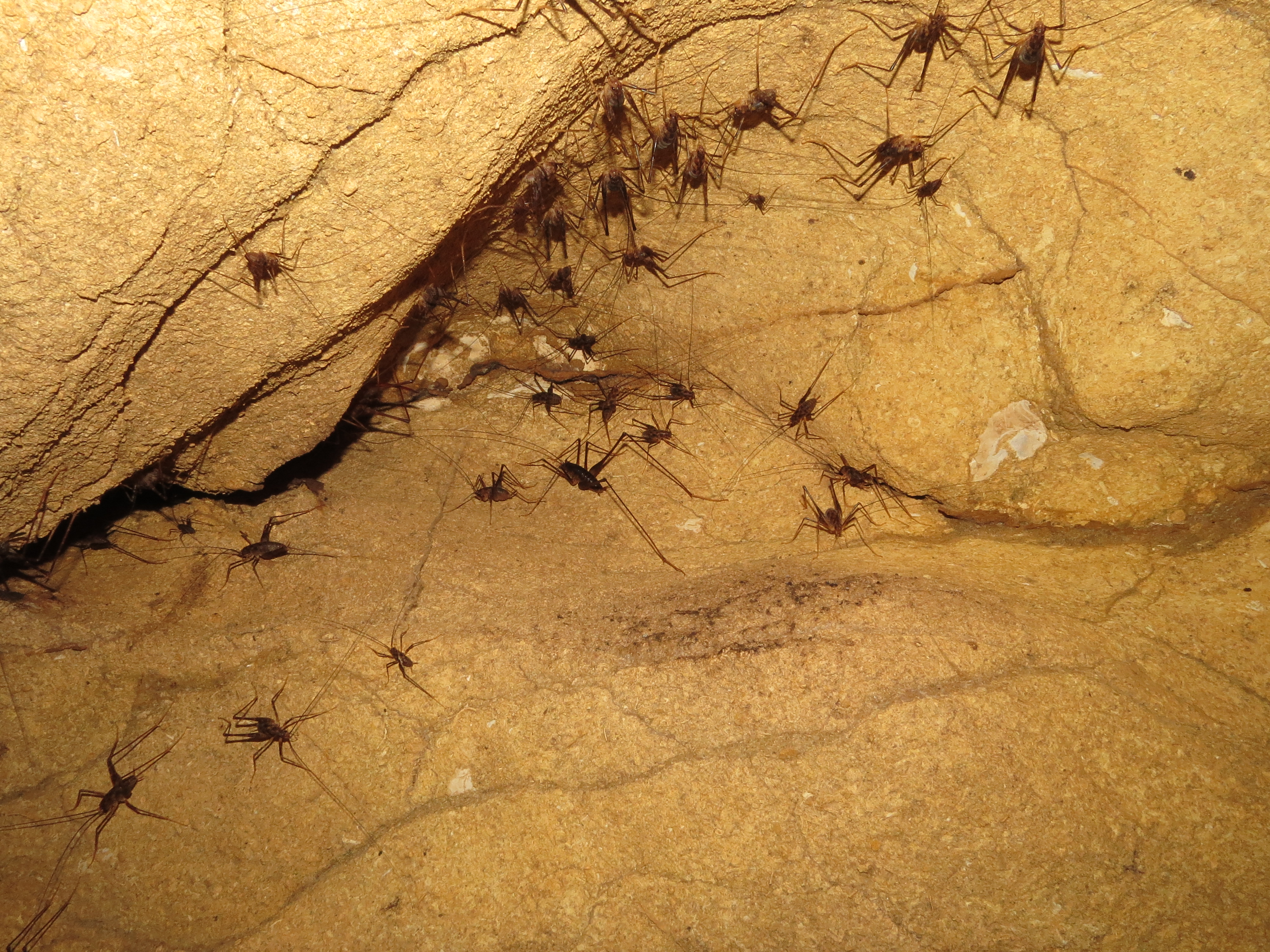
Aggregation of P. waitomoensis

Members of the genus are detritivorous scavengers that inhabit dark, damp refugia such as hollow logs, overhangs and caves during the day. They become more active at night and venture into the surrounding undergrowth to forage. They consume various organic matter such as plant seeds, fungi, animal droppings, and dead animal tissue. They will cannibalise the remains of other dead weta, and may also attack still-living cave weta while they are vulnerable during ecdysis (shedding their exoskeleton).

== Species ==
When Pachyrhamma is treated as a neuter noun, species names have a neuter suffix, e.g. -ceras rather than -cera, and -ense rather than -ensis.

- Pachyrhamma acanthoceras Milligan, 1926
- Pachyrhamma cavernae (Hutton, 1900)
- Pachyrhamma chopardi Karny, 1935
- Pachyrhamma delli (Richards, 1954)
- Pachyrhamma edwardsii (Scudder, 1869)
- Pachyrhamma fusca Richards, 1959
- Pachyrhamma giganteum (Richards, 1962)
- Pachyrhamma longicauda Richards, 1959
- Pachyrhamma longipes (Colenso, 1886)
- Pachyrhamma ngongotahaensis (Richards, 1961)
- Pachyrhamma spinosa (Richards, 1961)
- Pachyrhamma tuarti (Richards, 1961)
- Pachyrhamma uncata Richards, 1959
- Pachyrhamma unicolor (Salmon, 1948)
- Pachyrhamma waipuensis Richards, 1960
- Pachyrhamma waitomoensis Richards, 1958
