= Arthur Bartrum =

New Zealand geologist and university professor

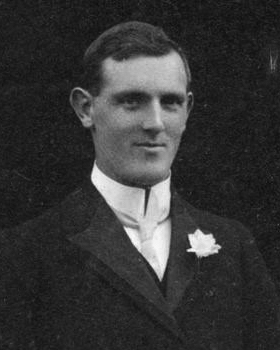
Bartrum in 1912

John Arthur Bartrum (24 May 1885 – 7 June 1949) was a New Zealand geologist and university professor. He was born in Geraldine, South Canterbury, New Zealand on 24 May 1885.
