= Transactions and Proceedings of the Royal Society of New Zealand =

New Zealand scientific journal

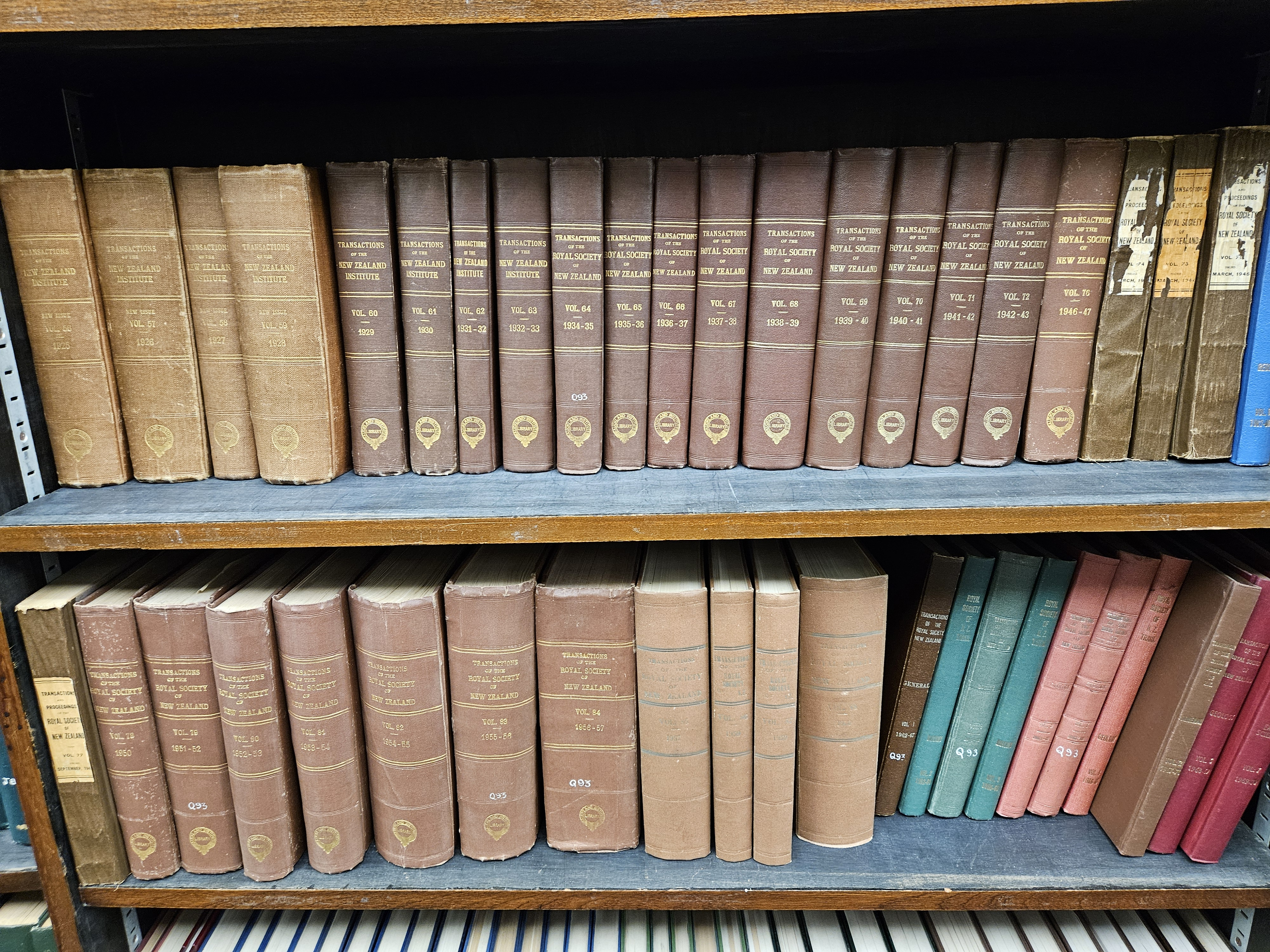
- Copes of the Transactions and Proceedings of the Royal Society of New Zealand held at the Auckland Museum Research Library
- Language: English

Publication details
- Former name(s): Transactions and Proceedings of the New Zealand Institute
- History: 1868 to 1961
- Publisher: Royal Society of New Zealand (New Zealand)

Standard abbreviations
- ISO 4: Trans. Proc. R. Soc. N. Z.

Indexing
- Transactions of the Royal Society of New Zealand
- ISSN: 0035-9181
- Proceedings of the Royal Society of New Zealand
- ISSN: 0557-4161

Links
- Transactions and Proceedings at National Library of New Zealand

The Transactions and Proceedings of the Royal Society of New Zealand was a scientific journal and magazine published by the Royal Society of New Zealand. Before 1933 the society was called the New Zealand Institute, and the journal's name was Transactions and Proceedings of the New Zealand Institute. It was active between 1868 and 1961 and was the most important scientific journal in New Zealand.

== Notable contributors ==
- John Buchanan, illustrator and botanist who prepared many of the illustrations for the Transactions between 1868 and 1885
- Thomas Cheeseman, naturalist
- William Colenso, botanist
- Harold John Finlay, palaeontologist and conchologist
- Charles Fleming, ornithologist and palaeontologist
- James Hector, geologist
- Thomas Hocken, botanist and anthropologist
- Ernest Rutherford, chemist and physicist, Nobel laureate

== See also ==
- Philosophical Transactions of the Royal Society
