= Onchoproteocephalidea =

Scientific classification
- Kingdom: Animalia
- Phylum: Platyhelminthes
- Class: Cestoda
- Subclass: Eucestoda
- Order: Onchoproteocephalidea

Synonyms
- Proteocephalidea

Order of flatworms

Onchoproteocephalidea is an order of flatworms belonging to the class Cestoda.

Families:

- Onchobothriidae
- Prosobothriidae
- Proteocephalidae

Onchoproteocephalidea incertae sedis:

- Matticestus
