= Charles Reed Laws =

New Zealand entomologist

- Born: 21 January 1894
- Died: 25 February 1985 (aged 91)
- Scientific career
- Fields: Geology, malacology

Charles Reed Laws (21 January 1894 – 25 February 1985) was a New Zealand geologist and malacologist, known for his work studying micromolluscs of New Zealand.

== Biography ==
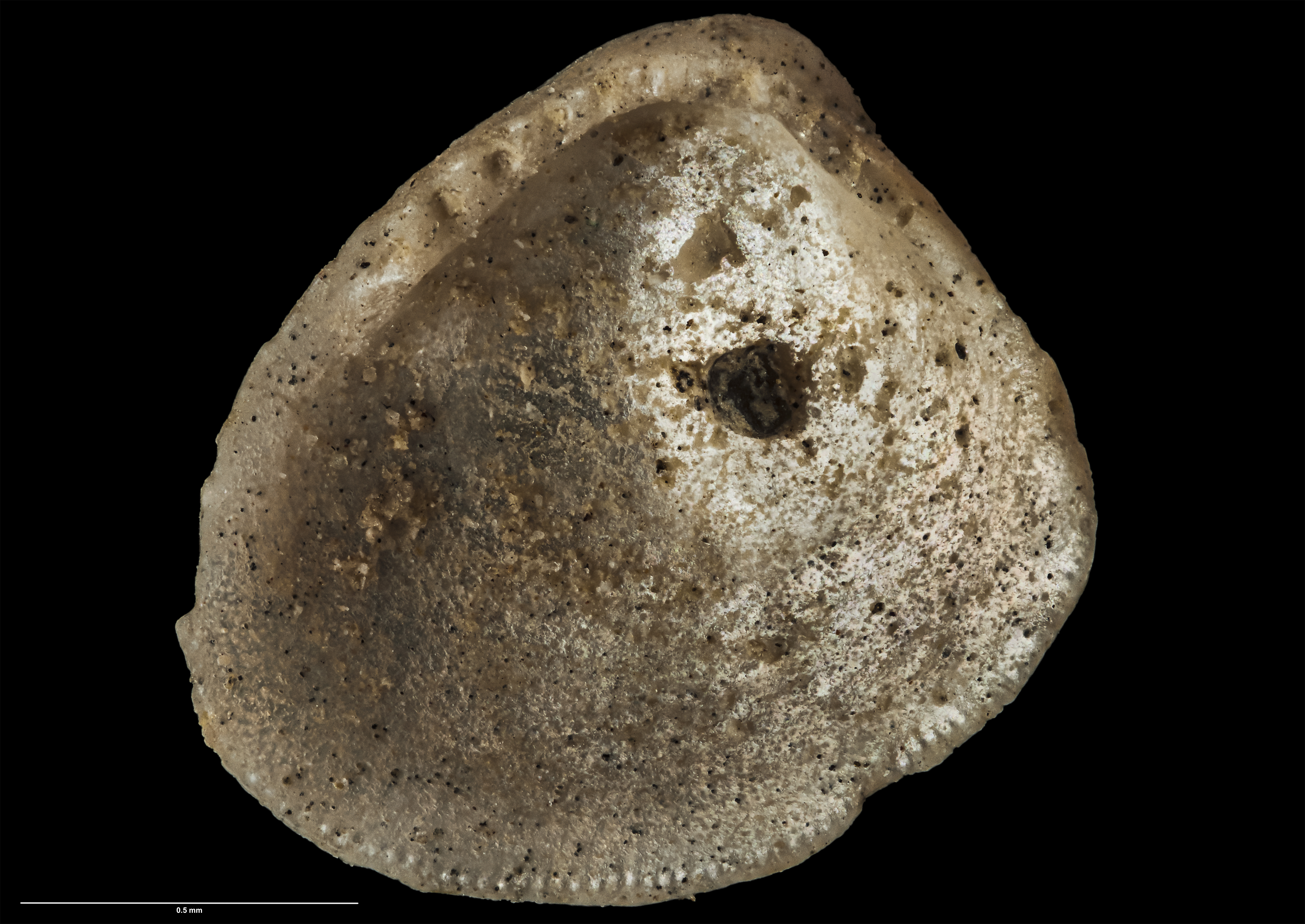
Holotype of Nucula ngatutura collected by Laws and Arthur Bartrum from the Waitotaran Faunule at Kaawa Creek, which Laws used to describe the species in 1936 as Pronucula ngatutura

Laws was born in Auckland, New Zealand, on 21 January 1894. His father was Methodist reverend Charles Henry Laws. He was educated at Christchurch and Dunedin, and attended Christchurch Boys' High School. After two years at high school, Laws left in order to become a teacher himself. During World War I, Laws became a sergeant of the 12th Reinforcements in Egypt and France. He later studied at Auckland Training College and Auckland University College, beginning to teach at primary schools in 1921. He completed his Bachelor of Science at Auckland University College in 1922, and in 1925, he became the second person to complete a thesis on geology at Auckland University College, winning the Julius von Haast Prize, awarded by the University of London.

From 1929 to 1931, Laws became a lecturer in geography at Dunedin Teachers' Training College, which he followed by being the Lecturer in Geography and Natural Science at Auckland Training College from 1932 to 1946. In 1946, he left to become the senior lecturer in geology at Auckland University College. Laws became acting head of geology in 1949 after the death of Arthur Bartrum.

Laws was encouraged to study malacology by paleontologists Harold Finlay and John Marwick. During the 1930s and 1940s, Laws became an authority on the gastropod family Pyramidellidae, publishing 122 new descriptions for species within this family. Laws was also involved in major fossil finding expeditions at Kaawa Creek and Pakaurangi Point. In recognition of his work, he was elected as a Fellow of the Royal Society of New Zealand in 1950.

Laws retired in 1959, after which he dedicated his life to spending time with family and his hobbies, including rose gardening.

== Personal life ==
In 1921 Laws married Evelyn Katie Lee. Together they had twin daughters in 1925 and a son in 1933. Laws' daughter Jocelyn was friends with his student Hope Sanderson (the first woman to graduate with a MSc with Honours in Geology in New Zealand), who she accompanied on a trip to England.

== Bibliography ==
- C R Laws (1934). "New Tertiary Mollusca from Timaru District, South Canterbury, New Zealand" (PDF). Transactions and Proceedings of the New Zealand Institute. 63: 315–329. ISSN 1176-6158. Wikidata Q89182259.
- C R Laws (1936). "The Genus Erato in the Tertiary of New Zealand" (PDF). Transactions and Proceedings of the Royal Society of New Zealand. 65: 17–22. ISSN 1176-6166. Wikidata Q89182325.
- C R Laws (1936). "New Eocene Mollusca from New Zealand" (PDF). Transactions and Proceedings of the Royal Society of New Zealand. 65: 23–29. ISSN 1176-6166. Wikidata Q89182327.
- C R Laws (1936). "New Tertiary Mollusca from New Zealand—No. 3" (PDF). Transactions and Proceedings of the Royal Society of New Zealand. 65: 30–43. ISSN 1176-6166. Wikidata Q89182329.
- C R Laws (1937). "The Waitotaran Faunule at Kaawa Creek—Part I" (PDF). Transactions and Proceedings of the Royal Society of New Zealand. 66: 38–59. ISSN 1176-6166. Wikidata Q89182376.
- C R Laws (1937). "The Waitotaran Faunule at Kaawa Creek, Part 2" (PDF). Transactions and Proceedings of the Royal Society of New Zealand. 66: 99–124. ISSN 1176-6166. Wikidata Q89182383.
- C R Laws (1937). "Review of the Tertiary and Recent Neozelanic Pyramidellid Molluscs" (PDF). Transactions and Proceedings of the Royal Society of New Zealand. 66: 402–422. ISSN 1176-6166. Wikidata Q89182421.
- D Sc C. R. Laws (1938). "A Review of the Tertiary and Recent Neozelanic Pyramidellid Molluscs No. 2—The Genus Chemnitzia" (PDF). Transactions and Proceedings of the Royal Society of New Zealand. 67: 47–70. ISSN 1176-6166. Wikidata Q89182430.
- C R Laws (1938). "Review of the Tertiary and Recent Neozelanic Pyramidellid Molluscs. No. 3—Further Turbonillid Genera" (PDF). Transactions and Proceedings of the Royal Society of New Zealand. 67: 166–184. ISSN 1176-6166. Wikidata Q89182446.
- C R Laws (1938). "Review of the Tertiary and Recent Neozelanic Pyramidellid Molluscs. No. 4—The Syrnolid Genera" (PDF). Transactions and Proceedings of the Royal Society of New Zealand. 67: 303–315. ISSN 1176-6166. Wikidata Q89182456.
- C R Laws (1938). "A Review of the Tertiary and Recent Neozelanic Pyramidellid Molluscs. No. 5—The Eulimellid Genera" (PDF). Transactions and Proceedings of the Royal Society of New Zealand. 68: 51–59. ISSN 1176-6166. Wikidata Q89182484.
- C R Laws (1938). "The Molluscan Faunule at Pakaurangi Point, Kaipara—No. 1" (PDF). Transactions and Proceedings of the Royal Society of New Zealand (in French). 68: 466–503. ISSN 1176-6166. Wikidata Q89182524.
- C R Laws (1940). "A Review of the Tertiary and Recent Neozelanic Pyramidellid Molluscs. No. 6—The Genus Odostomia" (PDF). Transactions and Proceedings of the Royal Society of New Zealand. 69: 191–209. ISSN 1176-6166. Wikidata Q89182544.
- C R Laws; Sc (1940). "The Waitotaran Faunule at Kaawa Creek—Part 3" (PDF). Transactions and Proceedings of the Royal Society of New Zealand. 69: 427–447. ISSN 1176-6166. Wikidata Q89182576.
- Laws, C. R. (1940). "Palaeontological Study of Nukumaruan and Waitotaran Rocks near Wanganui" (PDF). Transactions and Proceedings of the Royal Society of New Zealand. 70: 34–56. ISSN 1176-6166. Wikidata Q89182583.
- C R Laws (1940). "A Review of the Tertiary and Recent Neozelanic Pyramidellid Molluscs. No. 7—Further Odostomid Genera" (PDF). Transactions and Proceedings of the Royal Society of New Zealand. 70: 150–160. ISSN 1176-6166. Wikidata Q89182595.
- C R Laws (1942). "Review of the Tertiary and Recent Neozelanic Pyramidellid Molluscs.No. 8—The Pyrgulinid Genera And The Genus Evalea" (PDF). Transactions and Proceedings of the Royal Society of New Zealand. 71: 6–22. ISSN 1176-6166. Wikidata Q89182616.
- C R Laws (1942). "The Molluscan Faunule at Pakaurangi Point, Kaipara. No. 2" (PDF). Transactions and Proceedings of the Royal Society of New Zealand (in French). 71: 134–151. ISSN 1176-6166. Wikidata Q89182631.
- C R Laws (1943). "The Molluscan Faunule at Pakaurangi Point, Kaipara.—No. 3" (PDF). Transactions and Proceedings of the Royal Society of New Zealand (in French). 73: 297–312. ISSN 1176-6166. Wikidata Q89182755.
- C R Laws (September 1947). "Tertiary Mollusca from Hokianga District, North Auckland" (PDF). Transactions and Proceedings of the Royal Society of New Zealand. 76: 537–541. ISSN 1176-6166. Wikidata Q89182942.
- C R Laws (1948). "Further Tertiary Mollusca from Hokianga District, North Auckland" (PDF). Transactions and Proceedings of the Royal Society of New Zealand. 77: 142–150. ISSN 1176-6166. Wikidata Q89182969.
- C R Laws (1948). "A New Fossil Cirrepede from New Zealand Miocene Beds" (PDF). Transactions and Proceedings of the Royal Society of New Zealand. 77: 151–152. ISSN 1176-6166. Wikidata Q89182970.
- R. K. Dell; C. A. Fleming; C. R. Laws; J. Marwick; A. W. B. Powell (1952). "Proposed use of the plenary powers to conserve specific trivial names of New Zealand mollusca published in Thomas Martyn's "Universal Conchologist" (1784:)". Bulletin of Zoological Nomenclature. 6: 273–277. doi:10.5962/BHL.PART.16056. ISSN 0007-5167. Wikidata Q43376979.
