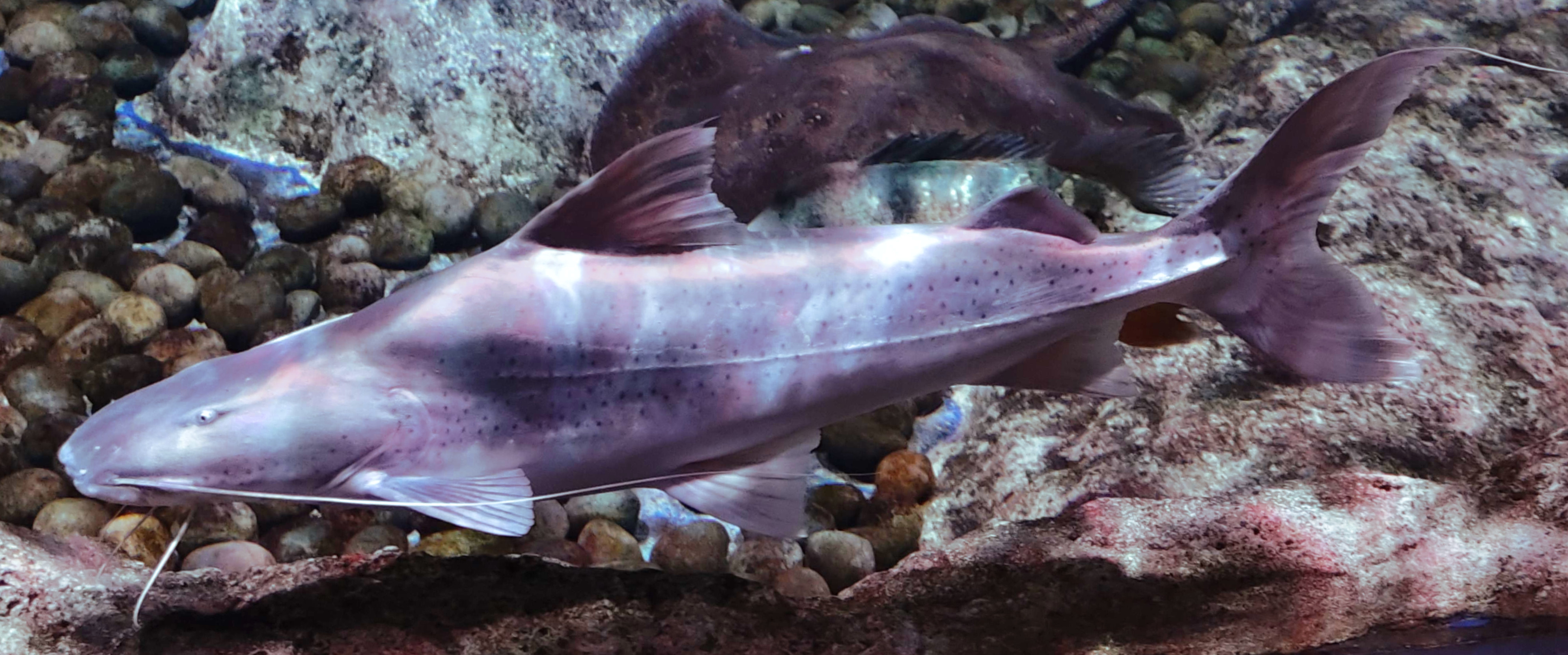
- Captive individual

Conservation status
- Least Concern (IUCN 3.1)

Scientific classification
- Kingdom: Animalia
- Phylum: Chordata
- Class: Actinopterygii
- Division: Teleostei
- Order: Siluriformes
- Family: Pimelodidae
- Genus: Brachyplatystoma
- Species: B. filamentosum

Binomial name
- Brachyplatystoma filamentosum (Lichtenstein, 1819)

Synonyms
- Brachyplatystoma goeldii; Pimelodus filamentosus; Piratinga piraaiba; Platystoma affine; Platystoma gigas; Sorubimichthys gigas

= Brachyplatystoma filamentosum =

Very large Amazonian catfish

Brachyplatystoma filamentosum, commonly called piraíba, kumakuma, valentón or laulau, and goliath catfish is a species of catfish in the family Pimelodidae which is native to the Amazon and Orinoco River basins, rivers of the Guianas and North-eastern Brazil. It is an important predator in its ecosystem, and in turn is a food fish.

== Description ==
The name "piraíba" is used by locals to define B. filamentosum specimens larger than 1.6 m (50 kg), while the term "filhote" is used for smaller individuals.

The piraíba reaches up to 3.6 metres (12 ft) in length and 200 kilograms (440 lb) in weight, though most individuals do not reach these dimensions, more commonly being 120 centimetres (47 in). Juveniles exhibit dark body spots or blotches. Like all fish in the Brachyplatystoma genus, the piraíba's single, outermost ray of the caudal fin extends into long filamentous extensions, which are complemented by long maxillary barbels that extend past the dorsal fin. The maxillary barbels may even extend to the caudal fin, especially when young. These long filaments and barbels are only reliably found on juveniles and sub-adults; it is assumed they are shortened or severed in attacks by other fish, or by accident.

B. capapretum, also called the "false piraíba", was recognized as distinct from B. filamentosum and described in 2005. These two species are sister genera; the species are assumed to be ecologically similar, and most locals do not differentiate between the two. The two species can be differentiated through premaxillary dentition, juvenile and adult colouration, and adult maxillary barbel length and caudal fin shape. Both species exhibit spotting in their juvenile stages, although in B. filamentosum these spots are about the same size as the eye, while in B. capapretum these spots are much larger in diameter.

The adult B. filamentosum has a relatively light dorsum, especially when compared to B. capapretum, which has a very dark or even black dorsum. Adult B. filamentosum have dark grey colouring on the dorsal side of the body, with a lighter white underside. They have paired pectoral fins, pelvic fins, a single unpaired dorsal fin, anal fin, and an adipose fin. The caudal fin is forked. While their body structure is somewhat reminiscent of a shark, they can be identified by their 3 pairs of barbels around the mouth.

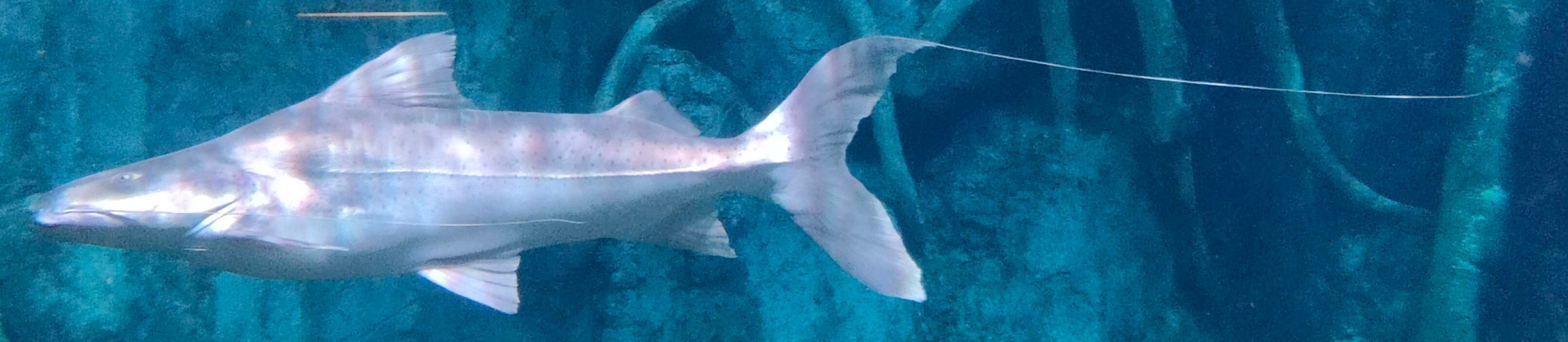
The tail filament of this individual remained intact

The mitogenome of the piraíba was sequenced in 2025; it was found to possess 16,566 base pairs.

== Distribution ==
The species is found in rivers and estuaries of Amazon and Orinoco watersheds, Guianas and northeastern Brazil.

== Ecology ==
B. filamentosum is found in both freshwater and brackish water systems. The species is a demersal potamodromous fish that commonly inhabits deeper, flowing channels with soft bottoms.

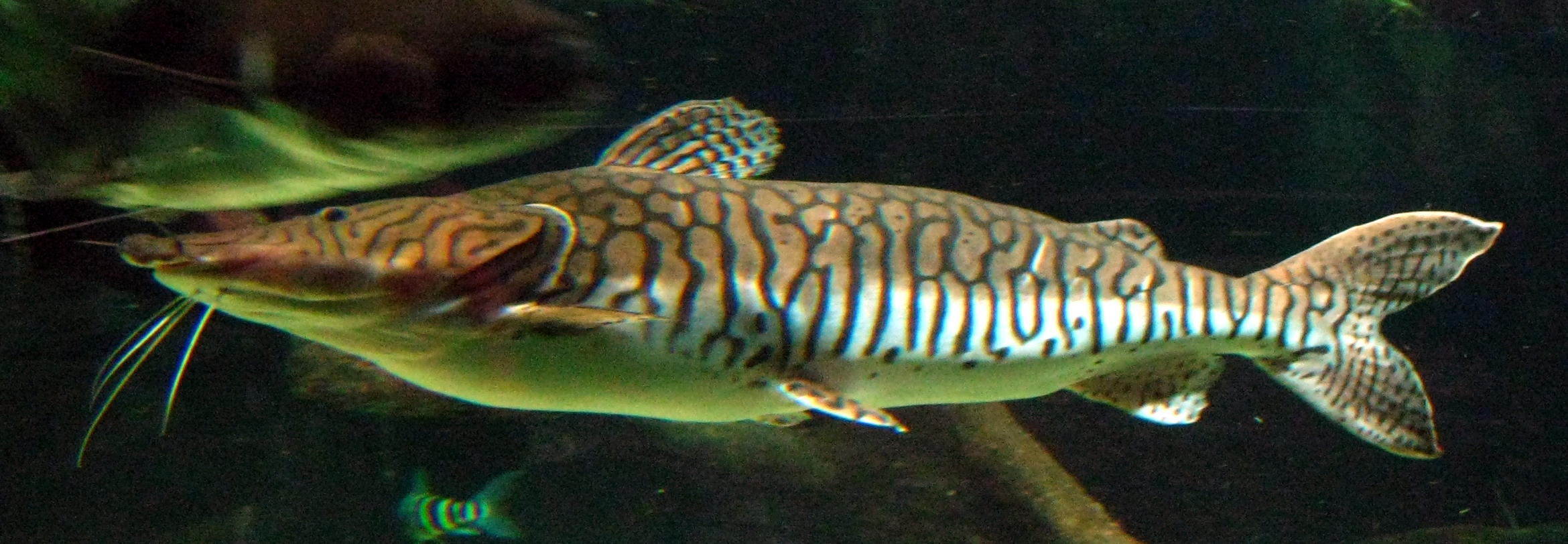
Despite being sizeable predators themselves, surubí may fall prey to the piraíba

The piraíba is strongly predatory, mainly preying on a wide variety of fish. The fish preyed upon include Achirus soles; characins from the genera Brycon, Colossoma, Hemiodus, Leporinus, Myleus, Mylossoma, Prochilodus, Schizodon, Semaprochilodus, Rhytiodus, Triportheus, along with indeterminate Curimatidae; catfish such as Ageneiosus, Calophysus vulture catfish, Hypophthalmus, Pareiodon candiru, Pimelodella, Pimelodus, Sorubim, and indeterminate members of the families Cetopsidae, Pimelodidae, and Trichomycteridae; Cichlids, Gymnotiformes, Pellona, and drums like Pachypops and Plagioscion. The piraíba is notable for its audacious propensity for tackling difficult prey items, such as toxic Colomesus pufferfish and stingrays; armored catfish among the Doradidae and Loricariidae, such as Doras and Oxydoras; and other predatory fish like Pseudoplatystoma and Rhaphiodon which are all taken by the piraíba, solidifying its position as top-order carnivore. Only the river dolphins has been recounted to prey on the piraíba, but even then, they may fail at killing and consuming much of the catfish; the doomed piraíba is then left crippled and at the mercy of the currents and riverine scavengers, such as the two genera of catfish referred to as candiru, and the aptly-named vulture catfish.

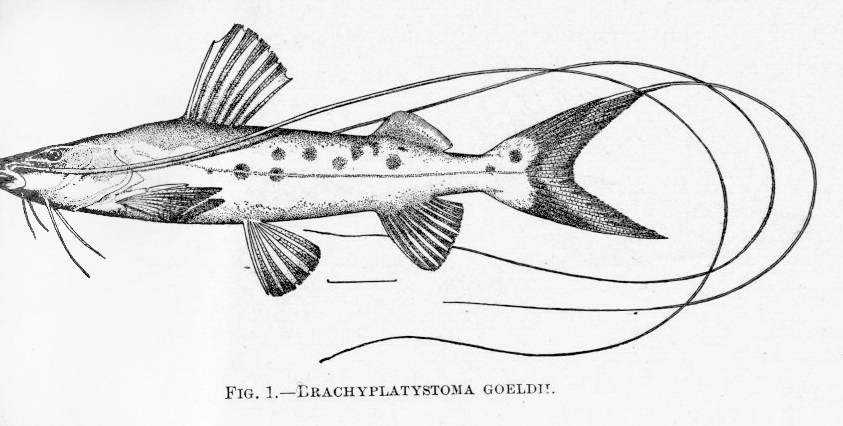
Juvenile piraíba

Piraíba begin their life as ichthyoplankton, metamorphosing through their larval stages as they drift downriver The young take aquatic invertebrates, such as diplostracans, rotifers, and aquatic insects, along with other arthropods adrift in the current. As potamodromous fish, they reach the rivers estuaries, where they remain for some time to continue growing and maturing. Eventually, the immature fish swim up the river to return to their spawning grounds. Mature adults may then return to the estuary to feed.

Spawning tends to occur in rising and high water periods, typically between February and June. In their larval stage, their diet consists mostly of insect remains and plankton, similar to other fish that are piscivorous as adults. Piraíba migrate across the amazon basin throughout their life. They rear their young in both upstream and estuarine environments.

== Relation to humans ==
Piraíba in a fish market

Piraíba are considered to be game fish, but are more valuable as a food fish; it was considered to be the 6th most important species fished in the Brazilian Amazon in 1998. Due to overfishing, catches have been declining.

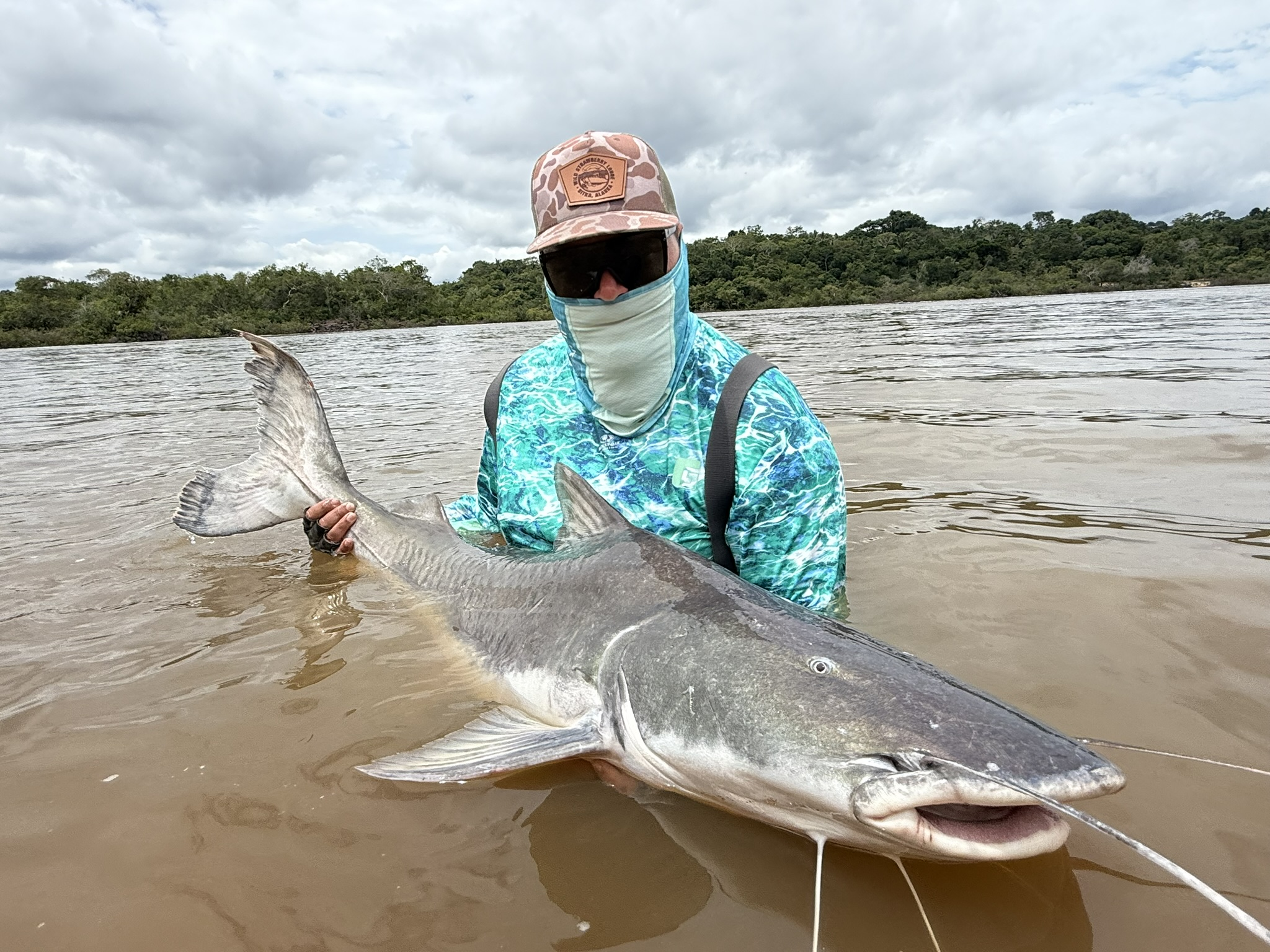
Piraíba are gamefish

These large species are used as food for people in South America, specifically the communities that are housed around the rivers. The skin residue is high in fatty acids and proteins, and is a usable alternative for several products, including gelatin. Gelatin is primarily produced using cows, which may introduce the risk of bovine spongiform encephalopathy. Fish residue as an alternative would mitigate this risk, as well as the other consequences of using cattle products.

Piraíba have often been said to be man-eaters, with claims of attacks or human remains having been reported. As recounted in the book Through the Brazilian Wilderness, during the Roosevelt–Rondon Scientific Expedition, Theodore Roosevelt and company claimed to have consumed a 3.5 ft (1.1 m)-long catfish of an unspecified species that contained the mostly digested remains of a monkey, which "astounded" the American expeditioners. Brazilian members of the expedition though shared stories of the piraíba; "a grayish-white fish over nine feet long, with the usual disproportionately large head and gaping mouth, with a circle of small teeth"; the expedition's doctor had witnessed two men killing a piraíba using their machetes after the fish had apparently jumped towards their canoe "with open mouth", with the fish's carcass subsequently paraded around town. Colonel Rondon said that the people inhabiting the lower Madeira constructed "stockaded enclosures in the water in which they bathed", ostensibly to protect from both the piraíba and the "big cayman"; the catfish were as or even more feared than the "big cayman" by swimmers, as the piraíba's habit of ambushing from the "bottom of the water" supposedly made it more dangerous than the caimans, which were more visible in comparison.

Furthermore, in one account documented on the television series River Monsters, a local fisherman was apparently found having been swallowed head-first up to his waist by a piraíba, with neither the fish nor the fisherman surviving the encounter. However, the episode itself states that the details surrounding this account are vague and unreliable.

Piraíba are sometimes kept in aquaria, although the adults need a very large tank to accommodate their active swimming habits.

== Conservation status ==
Piraíba, along with other large amazon catfish species, are important apex predators in the Amazon Basin. This water body serves as a central source for fisheries in South America, providing food for communities in the area.

However, this species, along with several other South American catfishes, are declining in population. Local fisheries are struggling due to overfishing, with records of decreasing catches being a primary indicator of their decline. These catfish are migratory, meaning they are especially sensitive to dam construction and habitat degradation, which impede their ability to migrate throughout the waterways.

Piraíba, along with other predator fish, are also susceptible to mercury contamination; this, along with their role as an important food source, puts many local communities at risk.

Fisheries there are poorly studied and we know relatively little about these species, so our understanding of the ecological impacts are also limited. Chemical analysis of otoliths within specimens has proven to help researchers study migratory patterns of piraíba, helping provide evidence of their life stages at different regions. This serves as an alternative method to physically monitoring their behavior, which eliminates several difficulties the latter method raises.
