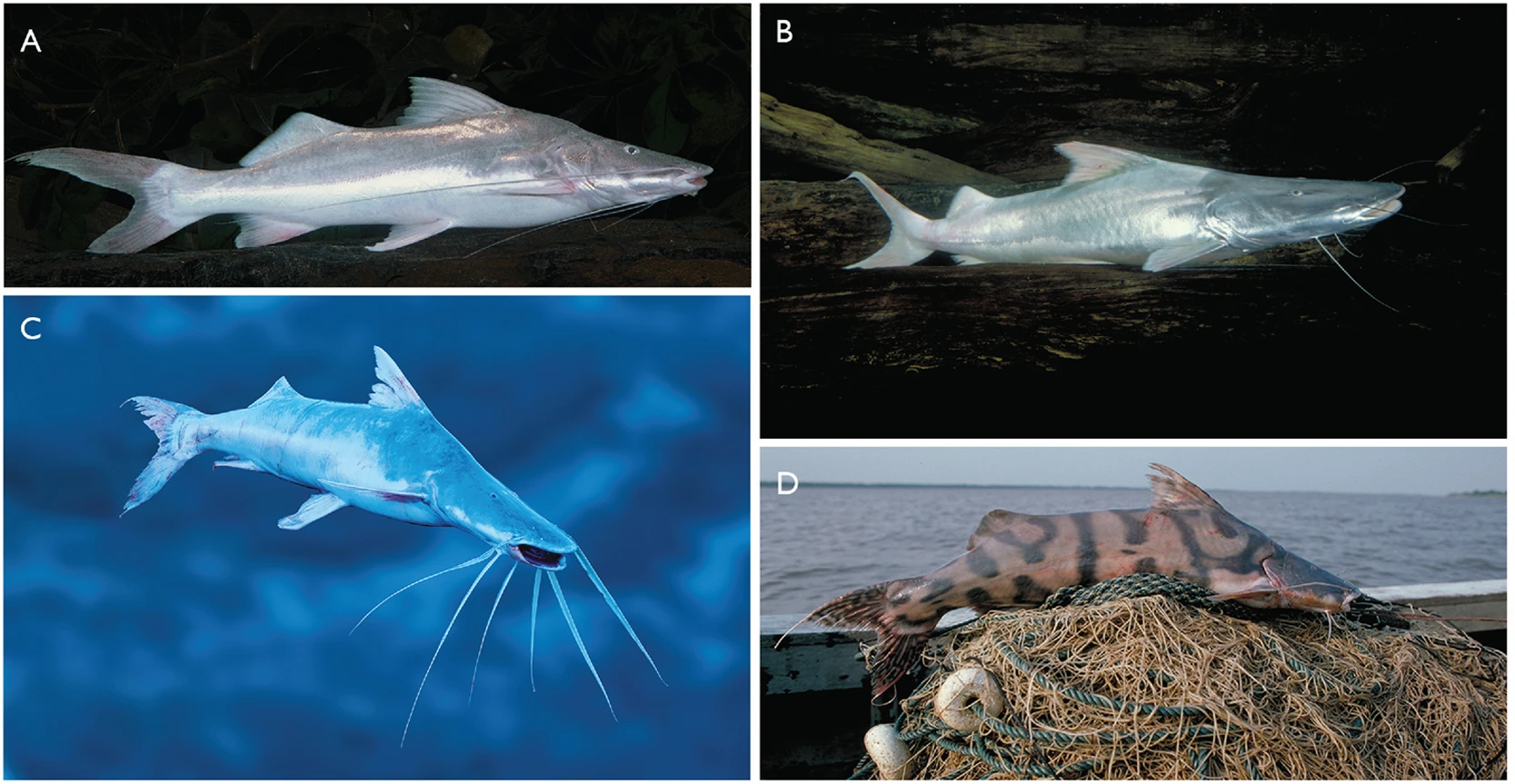
- Four different species of Brachyplatystoma

Scientific classification
- Kingdom: Animalia
- Phylum: Chordata
- Class: Actinopterygii
- Division: Teleostei
- Order: Siluriformes
- Family: Pimelodidae
- Genus: Brachyplatystoma; Bleeker, 1862

Type species
- Platystoma vaillantii Valenciennes, 1840

Species
- See text.

Synonyms
- Piramutana Bleeker, 1858; Piratinga Bleeker, 1858; Taenionema C. H. Eigenmann & Bean, 1907; Goslinia Myers, 1941; Ginesia Fernández-Yépez, 1951; Merodontotus Britski, 1981

= Brachyplatystoma =

Brachyplatystoma Temporal range: Middle Miocene - Recent

Genus of fishes

Brachyplatystoma is a genus of catfish from the family Pimelodidae sometimes collectively termed the goliath catfishes. As this common name indicates, this genus includes some of the largest species of catfish, including the piraíba, B. filamentosum, which reaches up to 3.6 metres (12 ft) in length; though the other species (and indeed most B. filamentosum individuals) do not reach this length. Brachyplatystoma are found in the Amazon and Orinoco basins, and other tropical freshwater and brackish habitats in South America. All species are migratory, which makes them important as food fish across their wide range. Some are also kept as aquarium fish.

== Classification ==
Brachyplatystoma is derived from the Greek words brachy, platy, and stoma, which mean "short", "flat", and "mouth", respectively. This genus was described in 1862 by Pieter Bleeker.

Brachyplatystoma and its monotypic sister species Platynematichthys are the only genera in the tribe Brachyplatystomatini. These two genera are characterized by two synapomorphies; these include a gas bladder divided into an anterior portion and a triangular posterior portion, as well as a ventral crest under the cleithrum, the main bone supporting the pectoral fins.

The genus Brachyplatystoma was previously not monophyletic; to correct this, the genera Merodontotus and Goslinia are now both included under Brachyplatystoma. Furthermore, a new species was described in 2005, which brings the species count to seven extant species. B. capapretum is sister to B. filamentosum.

The currently valid species are (Subgenera are based on the description of B. capapretum):

- Subgenus Brachyplatystoma:
  - Brachyplatystoma juruense (Boulenger, 1898) (Zebra catfish, Juruense catfish, Gold Zebra Pim, False Tigrinus)
  - Brachyplatystoma platynema Boulenger, 1898 (Slobbering catfish)
  - Brachyplatystoma tigrinum (Britski, 1981) (Tigerstriped catfish, Zebra shovelnose, Royal tiger shovelnose)
  - Brachyplatystoma vaillantii (type) (Valenciennes, 1840) (Laulao catfish, Piramutaba)
- Subgenus Malacobagrus
  - Brachyplatystoma capapretum (Lundberg & Akama, 2005) (Blacktail Piraíba)
  - Brachyplatystoma filamentosum (Lichtenstein, 1819) (Kumakuma, Piraíba, Filhote)
  - Brachyplatystoma rousseauxii (Castelnau, 1855) (Gilded Catfish, Dourada)
  - †Brachyplatystoma promagdalena Lundberg, 2005 – only known from a fragmentary Weberian complex (part of the vertebral column behind the head), Miocene origin fossil species found in Colombia.

B. flavicans is not actually a species of Brachyplatystoma; this name is a commonly used synonym of Zungaro zungaro.

Strict consensus phylogenetic tree based on six most parsimonious trees of pimelodids:

- Pimelodidae
  - Steindachneridion
  - - Phractocephalus-Leiarius group
    - - - Pimelodus group
        - Calophysus group
      - - Zungaro
        - Sorubim group
      - - Brachyplatystomatini
          - Platynematichthys
          - - - Brachyplatystoma
                - - Brachyplatystoma vaillantii
                - - - subg. Brachyplatystoma
                      - Brachyplatystoma tigrinum
                      - - Brachyplatystoma platynema
                        - Brachyplatystoma juruense
                    - subg. Malacobagrus
                      - - - Brachyplatystoma rousseauxii
                          - - Brachyplatystoma filamentosum
                            - Brachyplatystoma capapretum

== Anatomy and appearance ==
These catfish are generally streamlined fish, being powerful swimmers. Many Brachyplatystoma spp. exhibit countershading, in which the dorsal surface of the body is darker, paired with a lighter underbelly. In many species, this is consistent throughout life, though there are some exceptions: juvenile B. capapretum and B. filamentosum exhibit dorsal and lateral spots which mostly disappear in the adult form, while juvenile B. juruense and B. tigrinum exhibit lateral spots that expand to form dense vertical stripes as the fish matures; they are not strongly countershaded, but rather are disruptively camouflaged. B. vaillantii is the sister species to all other Brachyplatystoma, marked by differences in the skull, jaw, and other bones. The subgenus Malacobagrus is characterized by their derived lateral line, Weberian apparatus, a subquadrangular gill cover (as opposed to triangular in the other species), and pectoral spine. The caudal fin of adult Brachyplatystoma are moderately to deeply forked.

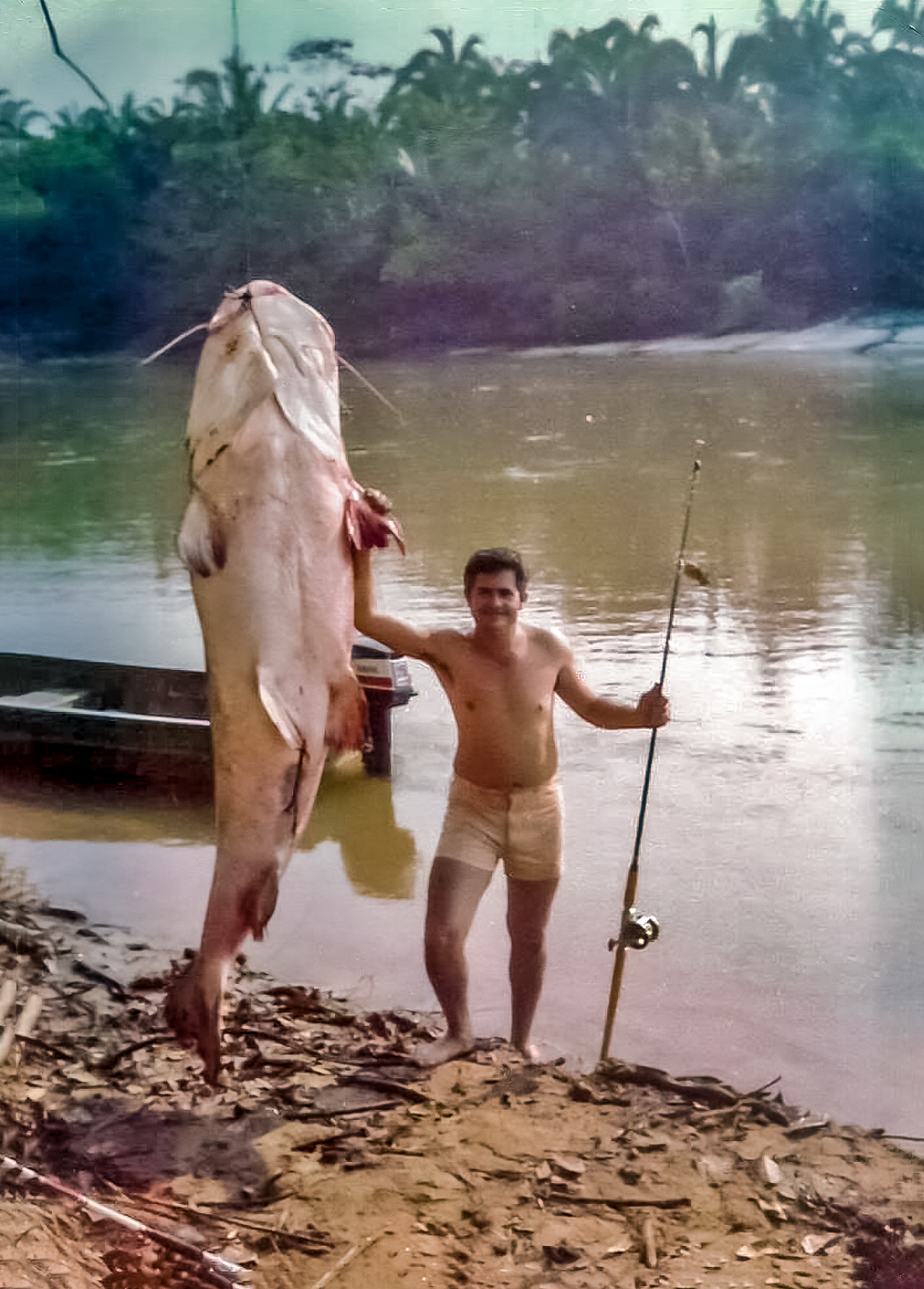
An angler poses with a captured piraíba

This genus is characterized by two synapomorphies (unique trait). One of these are unique insertions of the jaw adductor muscles; this trait is absent in B. tigrinum. The other, more obvious trait of the genus is only reliably found in juveniles and subadults; the single, outermost ray of the caudal fin are extended into long filamentous extensions, which are complemented by long maxillary barbels that extend past the dorsal fin in all species, but may even extend to the caudal fin, especially when young. The juveniles develop the caudal fin filaments from very early on, since the flexion stage of the larva. In adults of most species these filaments and barbels are usually not as elongated, as the elongated structures are often shortened or severed in attacks by other fish, or by accident. However, adults of B. tigrinum, B. juruense, and B. platynema often exhibit them.

Brachyplatystoma includes some of the largest species of Amazonian catfish, including the piraíba, B. filamentosum, which reaches up to about 3.6 metres (12 ft) in length and 200 kilograms (440 lb) in weight. The other species range in size from about 1–2 metres (3.3–6.6 ft), though some are smaller still, around 60 cm (23 inches) in length. The world record recognized by IGFA for Brachyplatystoma filamentosum belongs to the Brazilian, Jorge Masullo de Aguiar with 155 kilograms (342 lb).

B. filamentosum and B. rousseauxii have a mysterious "milk" gland at the anterior upper part of their pectoral fins. Its function is unknown, but in Colombia this fish is known as lechero, which means milkman.

== Distribution and habitat ==
Fish of this genus are found throughout the Amazon, Orinoco, and The Guyanas in South America. The genus does not occur west or north of the Andes or in the Venezuelan Coastal Range. These fish generally inhabit areas that have a soft substrate, such as mud or sand. The fossil catfish B. promagdalena has been found in Colombia in an area now drained by the Magdalena River, where Brachyplatystoma species are currently absent; during the Miocene, this area had been drained by the Amazon and Orinoco system. The pair of larger species, the piraíba and dark-caped piraíba, have a wider range of habitats than the smaller species; the smaller species are confined to river channels and estuaries, while the pair may enter floodplains.

== Ecology ==
These fish are mainly piscivorous preying on smaller fish such as characins, cichlids, and other catfish. B. filamentosum, the largest species, has been claimed to have even eaten humans on occasion.

=== Migration ===
The species of Brachyplatystoma migrate long distances for reproduction. This has been extensively studied in B. platynema, B. rousseauxii, B. juruense, and B. vaillantii, though B. tigrinum is included within this group of long-distance migrators (defined by traveling more than 1,000 kilometres (620 mi)). This migration is associated with white-water rivers, as black water does not contain enough food for migrating pimelodids. Maturation is timed to the increase of water levels prior to the rainy season, and migration also begins at this time. B. rousseauxii has the longest reproductive migration of any purely freshwater fish (only matched by the anadromous european eel, Anguilla anguilla); from the mouth of the Amazon to the headwaters around the Andes, the length of migration stretches more than 5,500 kilometres (3,400 mi) and five to six months, and may even exceed 11,600 kilometres (7,200 mi) which takes around 1–2 years, before they spawn in the western tributaries of the Amazon. It is hypothesized that at least B. rousseauxii is homing; returning to the tributary where it was born. Before spawning, the stomachs of these fish are empty, due to high digestive efficiency.

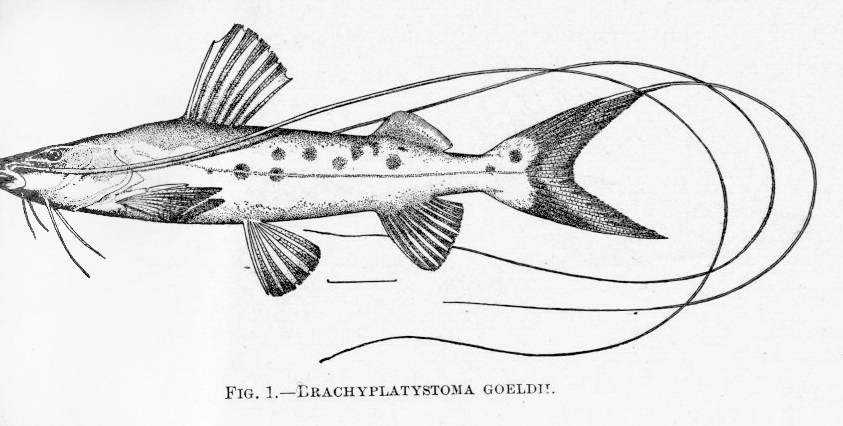
Young B. filamentosum

Brachyplatystoma have specialized pelagic young with greatly elongated barbels and fin filaments, and strongly ornamented pectoral spines. The young, sometimes referred to as alevins, are carried downstream, during which they develop through their larval stages, the specific identities of these may be hard to determine, though the use of meristics such as myomere count is possible. As they drift downriver, they consume animal prey that fits into their mouth; small crustaceans such as cladocerans and copepods, rotifers, the occasional spider and nematode, and insects both aquatic and non-aquatic are taken, with dipterans being the most common food item extracted from the stomachs of larval B. rousseauxii and B. filamentosum.

Juveniles and subadults are commonly found in brackish habitats, such as estuaries, staying there for about three years before entering the lower reaches of the river. At this immature stage, they may form groups or school. Along with Lithodoras dorsalis and "B. flavicans", catfish in this genus were some of the first recorded to have migratory young, at least for species within the Amazon basin. After reaching a certain size, juveniles swim upriver, beginning their migration towards their spawning grounds.

== Relationship to humans ==
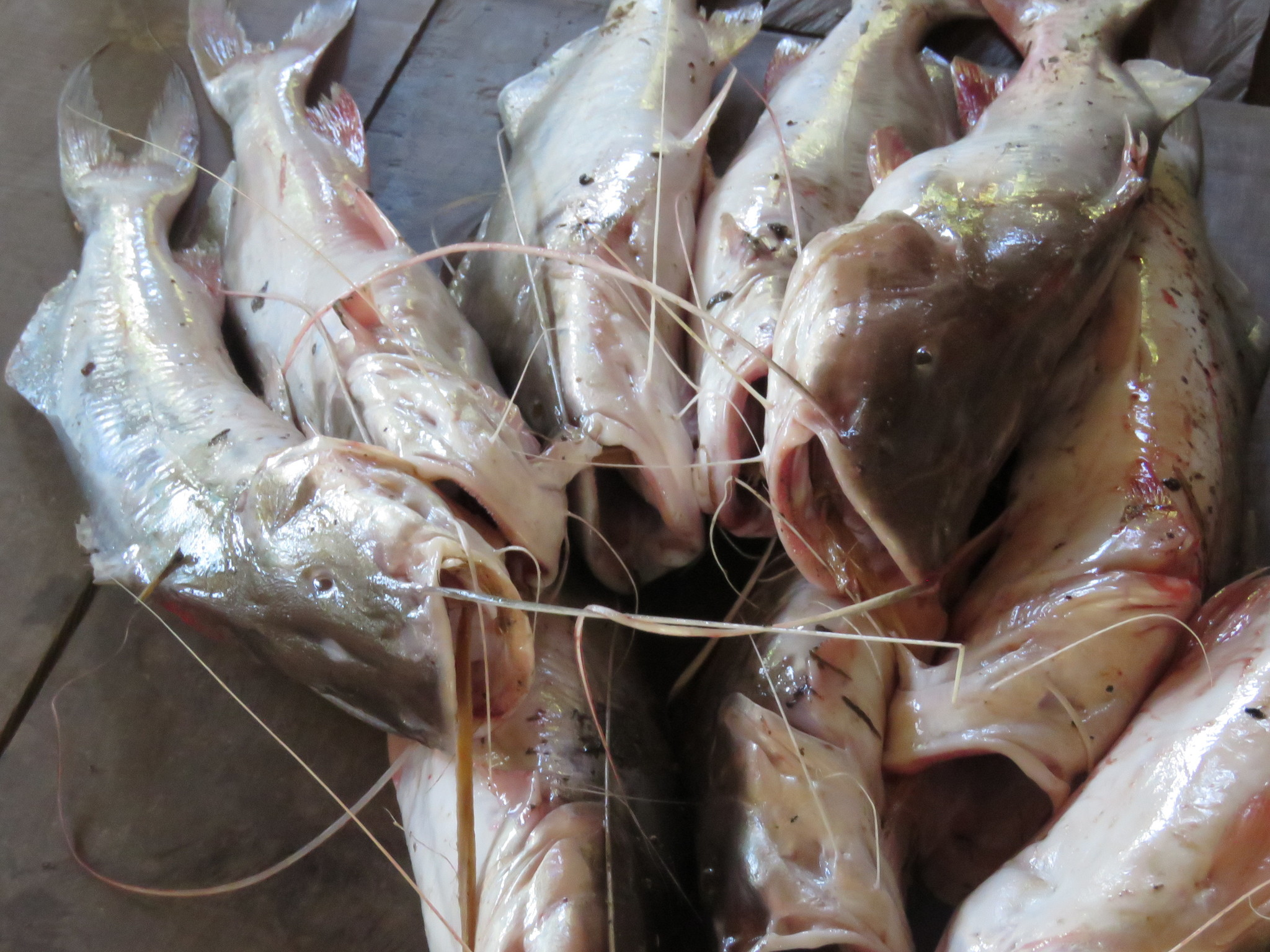
A catch of B. vaillantii

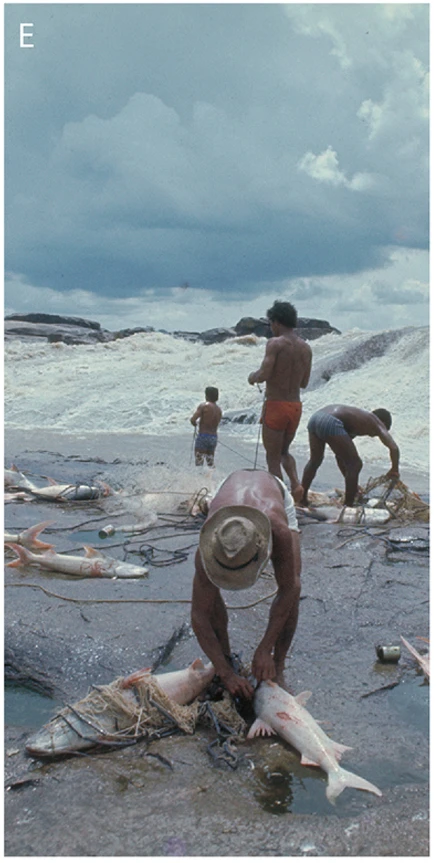
Fishermen hauling dorado (B. rousseauxii) at the Teotônio Rapids. These rapids are now drowned by the Santo Antônio Dam

Brachyplatystoma are important food fish. In the Amazon Basin, thousands of metric tons of fish from this genus are caught for both local consumption as well as exportation. These fish are usually caught artisanally with the use of longlines or drift nets. They are also captured by harpoon as well as ropes with large fish hooks at the end. B. filamentosum, B. rousseauxii, and B. vaillantii possess a major fishery, with B. rousseauxii being considered one of two most important catfish species caught in the Amazon River basin. Based on a review by IBAMA, B. vaillantii was by far the most caught fish by weight in the Brazilian Amazon in 1998, B. rousseauxii the fourth most caught and B. filamentosum the sixth (Semaprochilodus spp. second, Prochilodus nigricans third and Brycon spp. fifth). Fishing for Brachyplatystoma spp. may be done in estuaries, where juveniles feed and grow in preparation for their upstream migration, and where bycatch species such as Plagioscion squamosissimus and Sciades herzbergii reside.

Because these fish may migrate back to their original tributary, overfishing in a certain area may diminish overall catches as a whole genetic group is depleted. B. rousseauxii is considered overfished. Catch rates of B. filamentosum have decreased drastically from 1977; a 2020 study discovered that in the period of 1993-2010, catches of B. filamentosum and B. rousseauxii declined significantly, while B. vaillantii were captured more often, with total catch increasing along with fishing effort. Sea surface temperatures were found to affect the rate of catches by 19-38%. Other Brachyplatystoma spp. may also be at a similar risk.

The flesh of Brachyplatystoma is considered to be of excellent eating quality.

Human developments are another disruptive factor; dams may impede the migration of these fish both to and from their spawning sites. Deforestation can also affect the upriver spawning habitats, with these two factors being described as a "dangerous synergy" towards the conservation of Brachyplatystoma, alongside overfishing. Gold prospecting may also frighten these large catfishes in the areas where they spawn.

Conversely, there have been incidents where large B. filamentosum have supposedly preyed on humans. As recalled in the book Through the Brazilian Wilderness, during the Roosevelt–Rondon Scientific Expedition, Theodore Roosevelt and company claimed to have consumed a 3.5 ft (1.1 metres)-long catfish of an unspecified species that contained the mostly digested remains of a monkey, which "astounded" the American expeditioners. Brazilian members of the expedition though shared stories of the piraiba; "a grayish-white fish over nine feet long, with the usual disproportionately large head and gaping mouth, with a circle of small teeth"; the expedition's doctor had witnessed two men killing a piraiba using their machetes after the fish had apparently jumped towards their canoe "with open mouth", with the fish's carcass subsequently paraded around town. Colonel Rondon said that the people inhabiting the lower Madeira constructed "stockaded enclosures in the water in which they bathed", ostensibly to protect from both the piraiba and the "big cayman"; the catfish were as or even more feared than the "big cayman" by swimmers, as the piraiba's habit of ambushing from the "bottom of the water" supposedly made it more dangerous than the caimans, which were more visible in comparison.

Furthermore, in one account documented on the television series River Monsters, a local fisherman was apparently found having been swallowed head-first up to his waist by a piraíba, with neither the fish nor the fisherman surviving the encounter. However, the episode itself states that the details surrounding this account are vague and unreliable.

=== In the aquarium ===
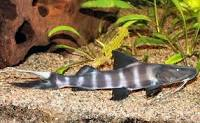
In aquarium

Brachyplatystoma are generally uncommon in the fishkeeping trade. The large size of many of these fish prohibit them from being maintained in anything but the largest of aquaria, or in public aquariums. B. tigrinum is a highly prized fish in the fishkeeping hobby, and is one of the most expensive fish in this family. Due to the similarity between B. tigrinum and B. juruense, the latter is often known as the False Zebra Shovelnose or False Tigrinus (as B. tigrinum was previously known as Merodontotus tigrinus).

These fish should be kept in well-oxygenated aquaria with a high current. Due to their large size, the aquarium should also be spacious and any tankmates must be large enough not to be eaten. The aquarium should not be brightly lit, and hiding places should be available. Breeding is unreported in captivity.
