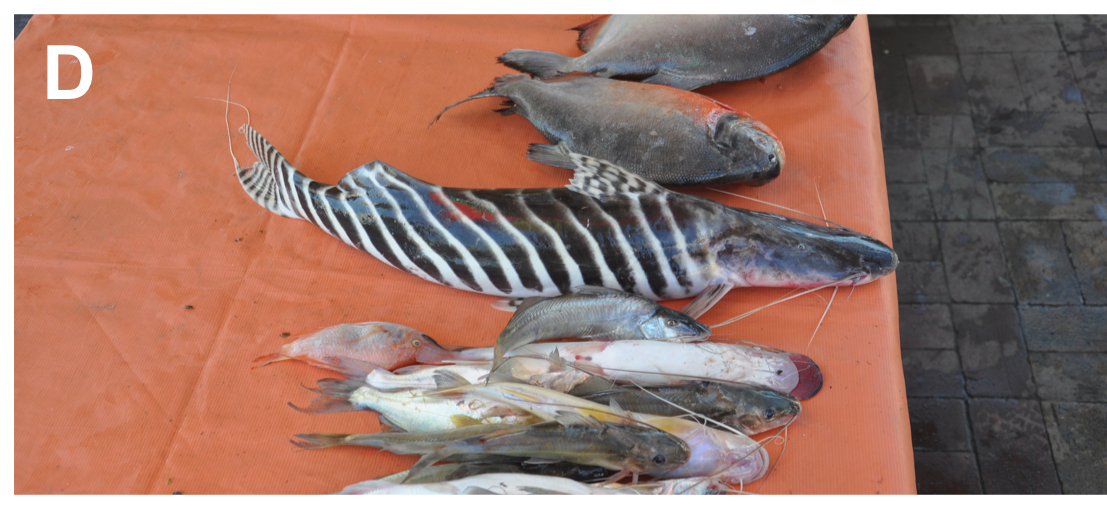
- Yasuní National Park

Conservation status
- Least Concern (IUCN 3.1)

Scientific classification
- Kingdom: Animalia
- Phylum: Chordata
- Class: Actinopterygii
- Order: Siluriformes
- Family: Pimelodidae
- Genus: Brachyplatystoma
- Species: B. tigrinum

Binomial name
- Brachyplatystoma tigrinum (Britski, 1981)

Synonyms
- Merodontotus tigrinus Britski, 1981

= Brachyplatystoma tigrinum =

Species of fish

Brachyplatystoma tigrinum, the zebra shovelnose, or tigerstriped catfish, is a large species of catfish of the family Pimelodidae that is native to the Amazon basin in Brazil, Colombia, and Peru. It is entirely piscivorous.

== Description ==
Although a typically reported maximum size is 60 cm (24 in) TL, a study in Peru found many that were larger, with the largest individual being 85 cm (33 in) long and 5.2 kg (11 lb) in weight. The head is elongate and compressed, and the tail has long filaments. The body is alternatingly yellow-off white and dark grey to black. It is sometimes confused with B. juruense.

== Distribution and habitat ==
B. tigrinum is found in the upper Amazon basin, with records from the western Amazon, Caquetá, Madeira, Marañon, Putumayo and Ucayali systems. Adults mostly inhabit fast-flowing sections of whitewater rivers, but can also occur in clearwater rivers.
