= Leopard catfish =

Leopard catfish may refer to:

- Corydoras trilineatus, the threestripe corydoras
- Corydoras julii
- Perrunichthys perruno
