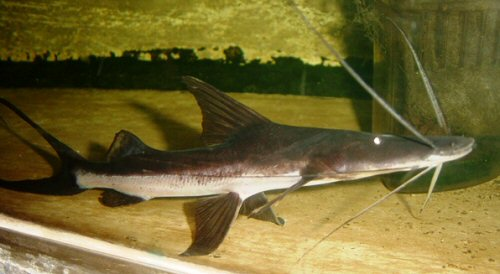

Conservation status
- Least Concern (IUCN 3.1)

Scientific classification
- Kingdom: Animalia
- Phylum: Chordata
- Class: Actinopterygii
- Division: Teleostei
- Order: Siluriformes
- Family: Pimelodidae
- Genus: Brachyplatystoma
- Species: B. platynema

Binomial name
- Brachyplatystoma platynema Boulenger, 1898

Synonyms
- Brachyplatystoma platynemum (emended to feminine); Goslinea platynema (Boulenger, 1898); Taenionema steeri Eigenmann & Bean, 1907

= Brachyplatystoma platynema =

Species of fish

Brachyplatystoma platynema, the slobbering catfish, is a species of catfish of the family Pimelodidae that ranges from Brazil, Colombia and Venezuela.

== Distribution ==
It is native to Amazon, Orinoco, Meta, Caqueta, Putumayo, Guaviare, Guayabero, and Metica basins of Puerto Carreno, Inirida, Rio Meta and Pará, northwestern Brazil. It also founds in llanos of Colombia and Venezuela.

== Description ==
It grows to a length of 1,170 millimetres (46 in), where male is about 65 cm and females is 75 cm. Head compressed and elongate. Barbels long, large and flattened. Dorsal surface light grey or brown with lighter below with no spots or stripes on body. Caudal-fin deeply-forked with narrow lobes in adults.

== Ecology ==
It is a potamodromous demersal fish that inhabits deepest channels of rivers with a sand substrate and stones and driftwood.

It is entirely piscivorous, preying on Prochilodus, Anodus, and Astyanax characins.

Like other members of its genus, it is migratory, although it does not undertake the same journey as some other species of Brachyplatystoma.
