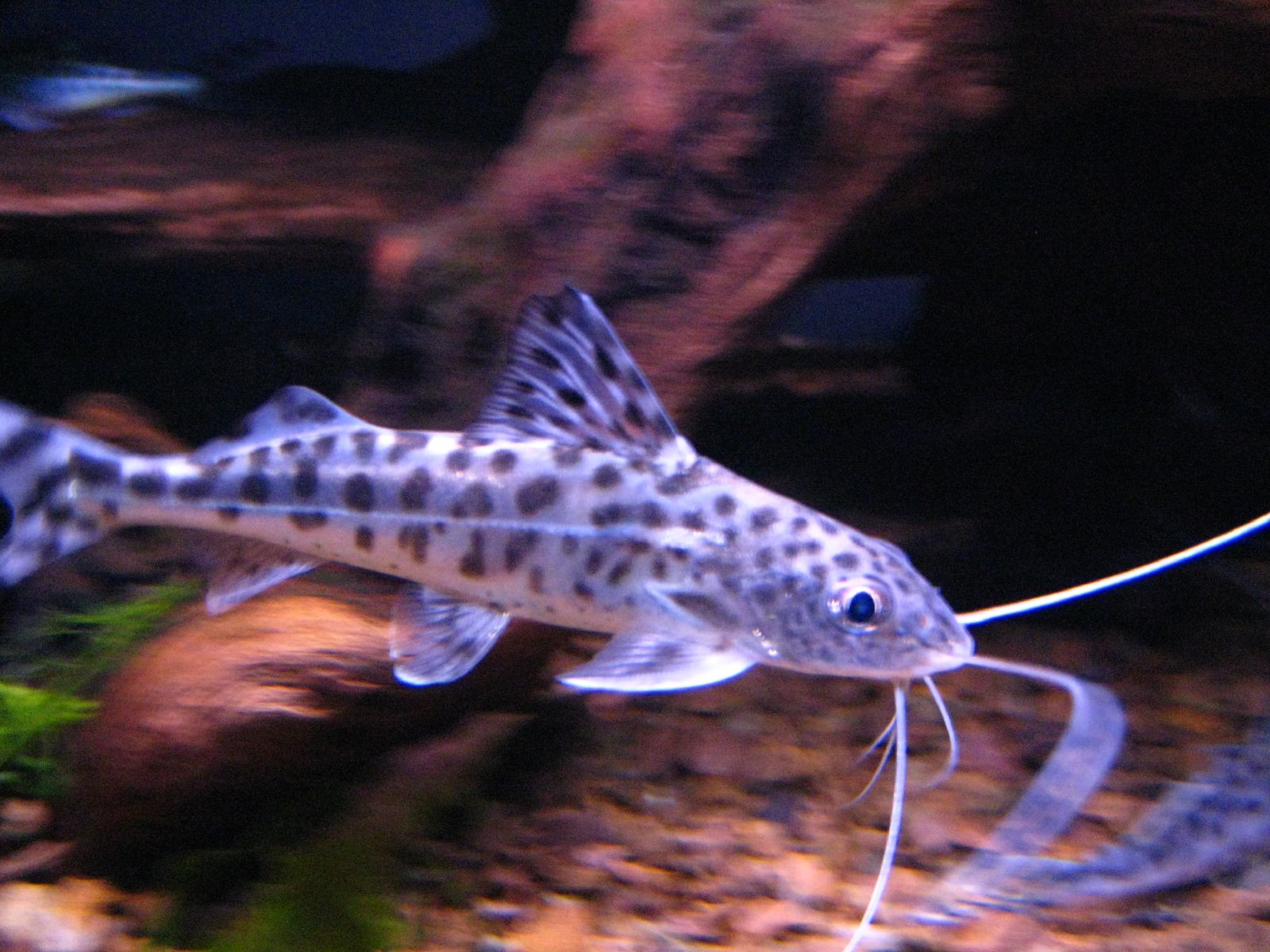

Conservation status
- Least Concern (IUCN 3.1)

Scientific classification
- Kingdom: Animalia
- Phylum: Chordata
- Class: Actinopterygii
- Order: Siluriformes
- Family: Pimelodidae
- Genus: Pimelodus
- Species: P. pictus

Binomial name
- Pimelodus pictus Steindachner, 1876

Synonyms
- Pimelodella picta (Steindachner, 1876); Pimelodella pictus (Steindachner, 1876)

= Pimelodus pictus =

Species of fish

Pimelodus pictus, also known as the pictus cat or pictus catfish, is a small (11.0 centimetres (4.3 in) TL) member of the catfish family Pimelodidae, native to the Amazon and Orinoco river basins and commonly kept as a pet in freshwater aquariums. Pictus catfish are sometimes mislabeled as Angelicus cats in the aquarium trade, but the latter name actually refers to an unrelated African catfish, the mochokid Synodontis angelica.

Pimelodus pictus should not be confused with Leiarius pictus, a much larger (60 cm (24 in)) pimelodid.

== Details ==
Pimelodus pictus, like other members of the Pimelodidae, are known for having extremely long barbels. These can extend all the way to the caudal fin. The fish are silver-colored with black spots and stripes. They have sharp spines on their dorsal and pectoral fins, which makes shipping a difficult task, since the spines can pierce plastic bags and get caught in nets. There is relatively little sexual dimorphism, with females being slightly larger than males. Like many catfish, P. pictus has a downturned mouth and a forked tail.

These fish are active swimmers and, like many catfish, nocturnal bottom feeders. Two forms are known; a large-spotted form and a small-spotted form. Of the two, only the large-spotted form is commonly seen in the aquarium trade; it does not grow as large as the small-spotted form.

In captivity, these fish prefer soft water and are omnivorous; pictus cats eat bloodworms, beef heart, insects, vegetables, and prepared fish foods. They will also eat very small fish such as neon tetras, depending on the size of the catfish. Despite this, they are generally non-aggressive and will not harm fish too large for them to eat. A larger tank is required as these fish are agile and fast swimmers. They are also non-territorial and can be kept with other P. pictus. Besides the mildly venomous sting imparted by the dorsal spine, they are generally harmless to humans.

In the wild, Pimelodus pictus has an estimated average trophic level of 3.19.
