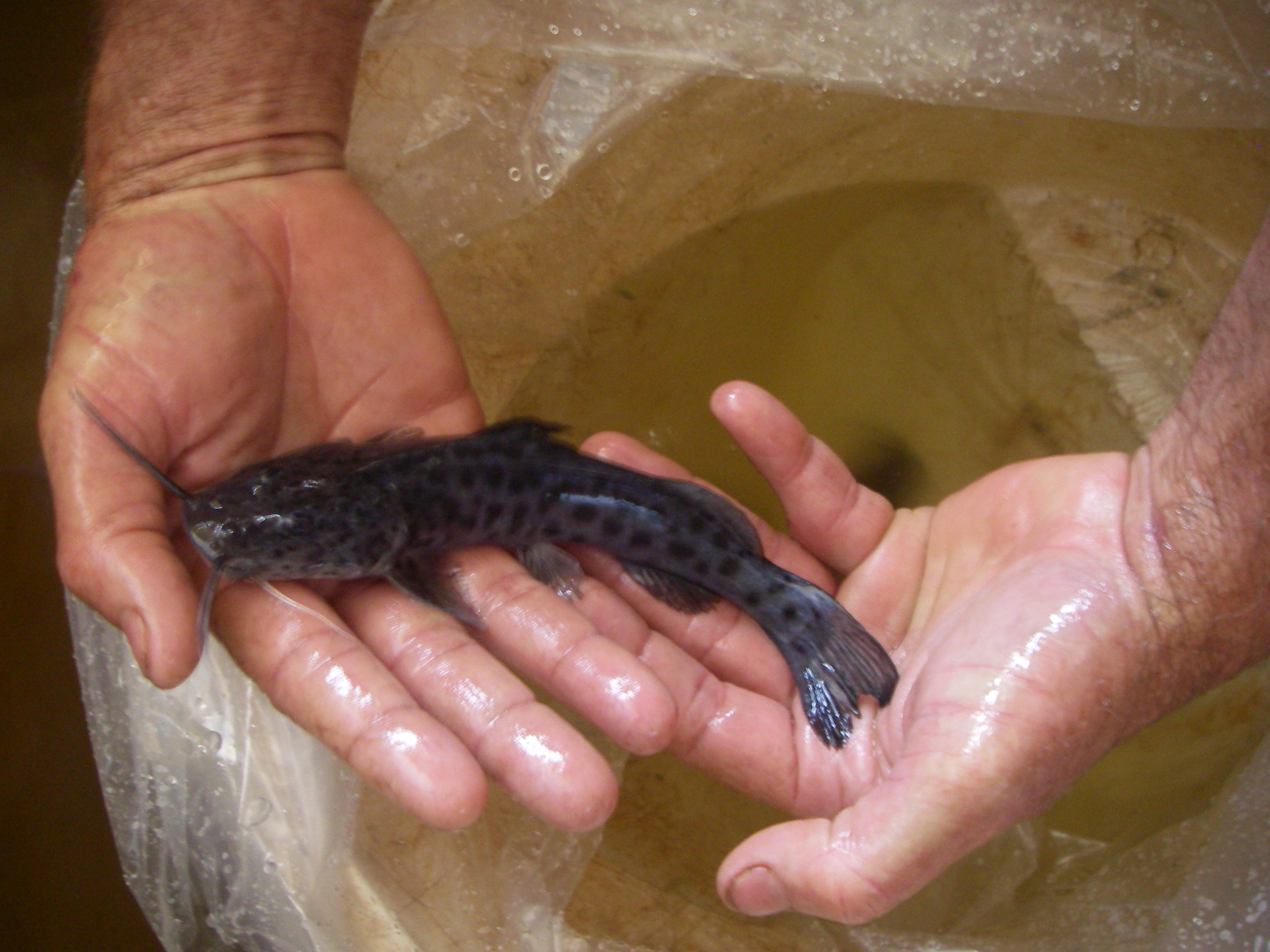
- Steindachneridion parahybae (juvenile)

Scientific classification
- Kingdom: Animalia
- Phylum: Chordata
- Class: Actinopterygii
- Order: Siluriformes
- Family: Pimelodidae
- Genus: Steindachneridion; C. H. Eigenmann & Eigenmann, 1919

Type species
- Steindachneria amblyurus C. H. Eigenmann & R. S. Eigenmann 1888

Synonyms
- Steindachneria; Eigenmann & Eigenmann, 1888

= Steindachneridion =

Steindachneridion Temporal range: Oligocene - recent

Genus of fishes

Steindachneridion is a genus of South American pimelodid catfish (order Siluriformes).

== Taxonomy ==
The first species of the genus, S. parahybae, was described in 1877 by Franz Steindachner under the name Platystoma parahybae. Later, Carl H. Eigenmann and Rosa Smith Eigenmann described Steindachneridia, named for Steindachner, for this species and for S. amblyurum (designated as the type species) in 1888. The next year, Eigenmann and Eigenmann described S. doceanum. In 1918, Miranda Ribeiro described S. scriptum and S. scriptum punctatum; later, S. punctatum was studied and considered to be a species of its own. However, because Steindachneria was already being used, these fish were transferred to Steindachneridion in 1919. The most recent species, S. melanodermatum, was described by Garavello in 2005. This genus currently includes six extant species.

Two fossil species of Steindachneridion have been found. The first to be described, S. iherengi (Woodward, 1898) was first described to Arius, but subsequently moved to Steindachneridion; though originally considered to be of Pleistocene age, it was later found to be actually of Oligocene age. It is known from the Tremembé Formation of Brazil. The second fossil species to be described was S. silvasantosi Figueiredo & Costa-Carvalho, 1999.

The phylogenetic placement of Steindachneridion and its relationship to other pimelodid genera is unresolved. These fish have been classified with Sorubim-like fish such as Brachyplatystoma and Pseudoplatystoma, or alternatively being closer to Phractocephalus and Leiarius.

== Species ==
The currently recognized species in this genus are:

- Steindachneridion amblyurum (C. H. Eigenmann & Eigenmann, 1888)
- Steindachneridion doceanum (C. H. Eigenmann & Eigenmann, 1889)
- Steindachneridion melanodermatum (Garavello, 2005)
- Steindachneridion parahybae (Steindachner, 1877)
- Steindachneridion punctatum (Miranda-Ribeiro, 1918)
- Steindachneridion scriptum (Miranda-Ribeiro, 1918)

== Distribution and habitat ==
Steindachneridion species originate from South America and are restricted to eastern Brazilian coastal drainages, plus the upper Paraná and Uruguay River basins. S. amblyurus originates from the Jequitinhonha River basin. S. doceanum originates from the Doce River basin. S. melanodermatum originates from Iguaçu River in Brazil. S. parahybae originates from Paraíba do Sul and Jequitinhonha River basins. S. punctatum originates from the upper Paraná River and the Uruguay River basins. S. scriptum originates from the Uruguay River.

The large species of Steindachneridion always occur in swift-flowing, clear-water rivers running over large stony beds. S. melanodermatum may rely on deep pools as refugia in its degraded river habitat. These fish are naturally scarce in their habitats.

== Appearance and anatomy ==
Steindachneridion species are large fish, reaching 100 cm (39 in) in total length or more. S. doceanum reaches 42 cm (17 in) in standard length. S. melanodermatum reaches a length of about 53.2 cm (20.9 in) SL, though may reach 102 cm (40 in). S. punctatum reaches about 70 cm (28 in) SL.

These fish have relatively small eyes and heads. They have long maxillary barbels that extend to the base of their dorsal fins or adipose fins. The adipose fin is relatively long and straight, and its base is longer than the base of the anal fin. Pectoral and dorsal fin spines are short. Most of these species have light grayish or brownish ground color patterns combined with dark brown, vermiculated dark stripes or spots; however, S. doceanum has reticulations over its body instead of spots, and S. melanodermatum is unique in the genus for its dark brown ground color. S. amblyurum differs from other members of this species by having a rounded caudal fin instead of notched.

== Relationship to humans ==
Steindachneridion species suffer intense anthropogenic pressure, through modification to their habitat (largely due to the construction of hydroelectric dams) and due to overfishing; consequently, some of them are highly endangered and practically extinct in various parts of their original areas of distribution. Of the six recognized species, all but S. punctatum are considered threatened by Brazil's Ministry of the Environment. Water pollution is another threat, which kills embryos and catfish larvae even with low concentration of pollutants. Due to their economic importance as a food source, some aquaculture stations are currently developing programs for captive propagation of Steindachneridion species. Fish produced by these programs would be used in fish farms and to restore natural stocks in degraded habitats.
