= Pimelodus absconditus =

Conservation status
- Least Concern (IUCN 3.1)

Scientific classification
- Kingdom: Animalia
- Phylum: Chordata
- Class: Actinopterygii
- Division: Teleostei
- Order: Siluriformes
- Family: Pimelodidae
- Genus: Pimelodus
- Species: P. absconditus

Binomial name
- Pimelodus absconditus Azpelicueta, 1995

Species of ray-finned fish

Pimelodus absconditus is a species of long-whiskered catfish in the family Pimelodidae. Referred to colloquially as mandi pintado along side several other species of Pimelodus, which translates to painted mandi, it is characterized by its irregular brown spots along the back, and grows to approximately 15 to 20 cm (6 to 8 in).

P. absconditus is a benthopelagic freshwater catfish found throughout the Paraná River and Uruguay River river basins in Uruguay and Argentina, rivers in southern Brazil as well as Bolivia and Paraguay.
