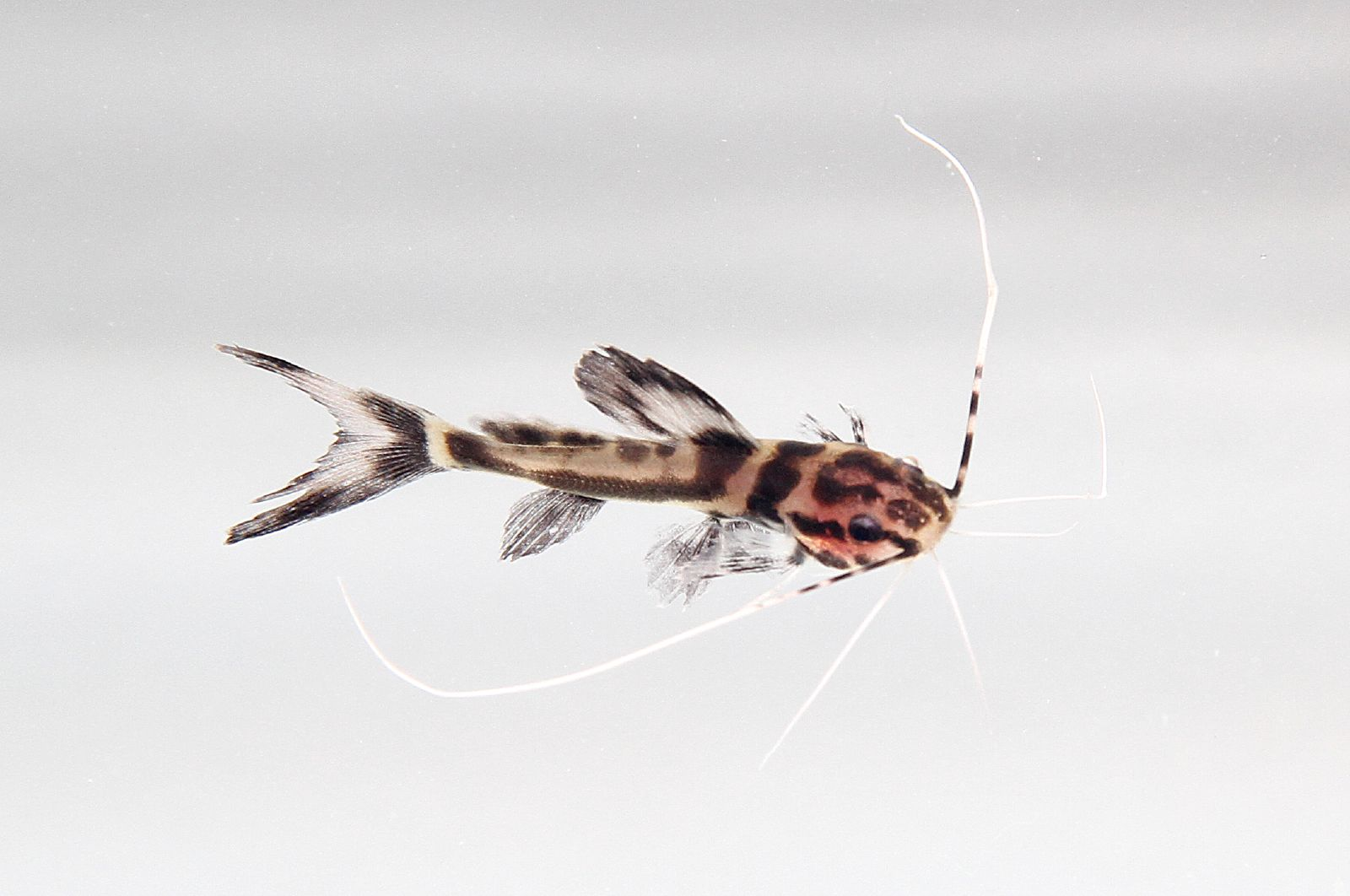
- Juvenile

Conservation status
- Least Concern (IUCN 3.1)

Scientific classification
- Kingdom: Animalia
- Phylum: Chordata
- Class: Actinopterygii
- Order: Siluriformes
- Family: Pimelodidae
- Genus: Leiarius
- Species: L. marmoratus

Binomial name
- Leiarius marmoratus (T. N. Gill, 1870)

Synonyms
- Sciades marmoratus Gill, 1870

= Leiarius marmoratus =

Species of fish

Leiarius marmoratus, commonly as Sailfin Pim or Achara catfish, is a species of demersal catfish of the family Pimelodidae that is native to Amazon and Orinoco river basins.

== Description ==
It grows to a length of 100 cm (39 in).
