= Hypophthalmus edentatus =

Conservation status
- Least Concern (IUCN 3.1)

Scientific classification
- Kingdom: Animalia
- Phylum: Chordata
- Class: Actinopterygii
- Order: Siluriformes
- Family: Pimelodidae
- Genus: Hypophthalmus
- Species: H. edentatus

Binomial name
- Hypophthalmus edentatus Spix & Agassiz, 1829

Species of fish

The Highwaterman catfish (Hypophthalmus edentatus), is a species of pelagic potamodromous catfish of the family Pimelodidae that is native to Guyana, Suriname, Venezuela, northern Brazil and Gulf of Paria.

== Description ==
It grows to a length of 57.5 cm (22.6 in). It has no teeth but possesses many long gill rakers and three long barbels. Body elongated with less depressed head. Caudal fin triangular. Lateral line complete and scales absent on skin. Dorsum light grey with steely blue cast. Ventral sides yellowish and whitish below. Barbels light grey.

== Distribution ==
It inhabits Amazon and Orinoco River basins and Atlantic coastal rivers of Guyana and Suriname. It is also found in Paraná River.

== Ecology ==
It lives in soft muddy bottoms and are filter feeders. It feeds on crustaceans like debris, cladocerans, copepods and ostracods. Expected life span in aquarium is 16-17 years.
