= Micromischodus =

Conservation status
- Least Concern (IUCN 3.1)

Scientific classification
- Kingdom: Animalia
- Phylum: Chordata
- Class: Actinopterygii
- Order: Characiformes
- Family: Hemiodontidae
- Genus: Micromischodus; T. R. Roberts, 1971
- Species: M. sugillatus

Binomial name
- Micromischodus sugillatus T. R. Roberts, 1971

Species of fish

Micromischodus is a monospecific genus of freshwater ray-finned fish belonging to the family Hemiodontidae, the halftooths. The only species in the genus is Micromischodus sugillatus which is found in the Amazon basin in Brazil.
