= Hypophthalmus fimbriatus =

Conservation status
- Least Concern (IUCN 3.1)

Scientific classification
- Kingdom: Animalia
- Phylum: Chordata
- Class: Actinopterygii
- Order: Siluriformes
- Family: Pimelodidae
- Genus: Hypophthalmus
- Species: H. fimbriatus

Binomial name
- Hypophthalmus fimbriatus Kner, 1858

Species of fish

Hypophthalmus fimbriatus, the dolphin catfish, is a species of demersal potamodromous catfish of the family Pimelodidae that is native to Santarém and the Negro River basin of Brazil and Venezuela.

== Description ==
It grows to a length of 30 cm (12 in).

== Ecology ==
It inhabits mostly blackwater rivers. It is largely zooplanktivorous specially cladocerans.
