= Pimelodus pohli =

Conservation status
- Least Concern (IUCN 3.1)

Scientific classification
- Kingdom: Animalia
- Phylum: Chordata
- Class: Actinopterygii
- Order: Siluriformes
- Family: Pimelodidae
- Genus: Pimelodus
- Species: P. pohli

Binomial name
- Pimelodus pohli Ribeiro & Lucena, 2006

Species of fish

Pimelodus pohli is a species of catfish belonging to the family Pimelodidae. It is only found in the São Francisco River, Brazil, and its tributaries.

Smaller, younger members of this species (under 10.0 centimetres (3.9 in) standard length) have a grey body marked with four rows of small dark spots, larger specimens tending to be plain grey. The species reaches a maximum length of 15.0 centimetres (5.9 in) standard length. It has a rather deep body with a large eye and noticeably protruding upper jaw. The maxillary barbels are very long, reaching the deeply forked caudal fin, when stretched along the body. Among the other characteristics which distinguish it from its congeners is the rather long adipose fin.

The specific name honours the Austrian naturalist Johann Baptist Emanuel Pohl, who along with Johann Natterer, collected specimens in the São Francisco basin in the 19th century.
