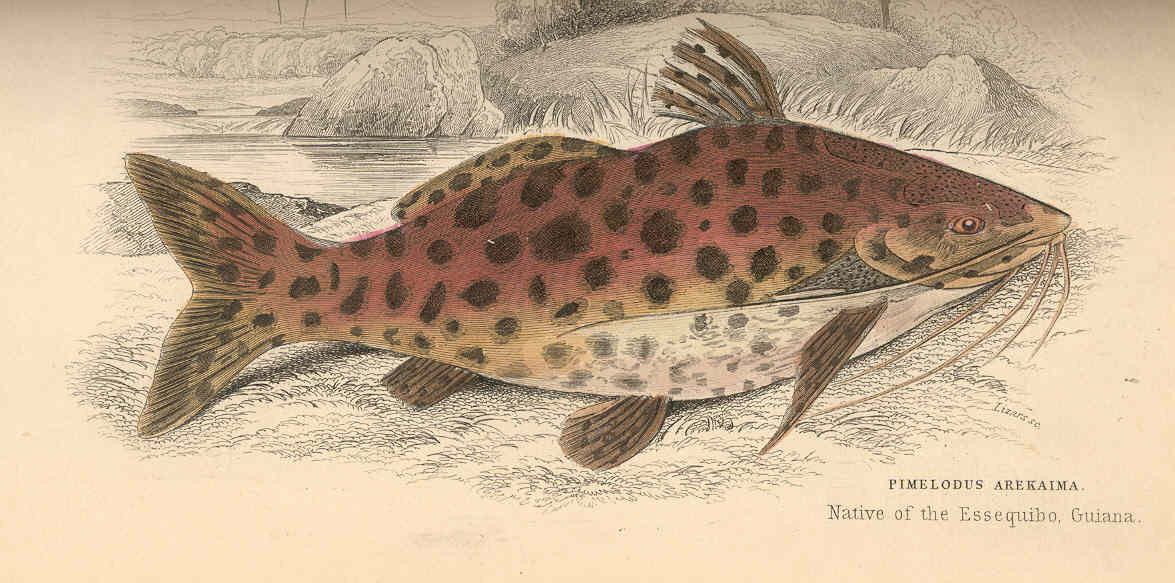

Scientific classification
- Kingdom: Animalia
- Phylum: Chordata
- Class: Actinopterygii
- Order: Siluriformes
- Family: Pimelodidae
- Genus: Leiarius
- Species: L. arekaima

Binomial name
- Leiarius arekaima (Jardine, 1841)

Synonyms
- Pimelodus arekaima Jardine in Schomburgk, 1841; Rhamdia arekaima (Jardine, 1841)

= Leiarius arekaima =

Species of fish

Leiarius arekaima, commonly known as the Tiger pimelodus, is a species of benthopelagic catfish that is currently incertae sedis the family Pimelodidae. It is native to Guyana and Brazil.

== Description ==
It grows to a length of 66 cm (26 in).
