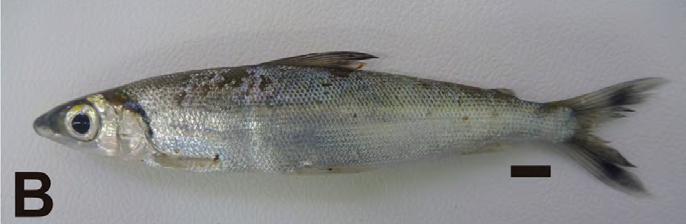
- Argonectes robertsi (scale bar = 1 cm)

Scientific classification
- Kingdom: Animalia
- Phylum: Chordata
- Class: Actinopterygii
- Order: Characiformes
- Family: Hemiodontidae
- Genus: Argonectes; J. E. Böhlke & G. S. Myers, 1956

Type species
- Argonectes scapularis Böhlke & Myers, 1956

= Argonectes =

Genus of fishes

Argonectes is a genus of freshwater ray-finned fishes belonging to the family Hemiodontidae, the halftooths. The fishes in this genus are found in tropical South America.

== Species ==
Argonectes has the following species classified within it:

- Argonectes longiceps (Kner, 1858)
- Argonectes robertsi Langeani, 1999
