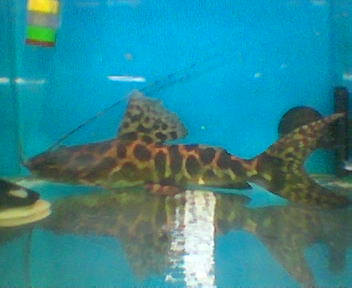

Conservation status
- Data Deficient (IUCN 3.1)

Scientific classification
- Kingdom: Animalia
- Phylum: Chordata
- Class: Actinopterygii
- Division: Teleostei
- Order: Siluriformes
- Family: Pimelodidae
- Genus: Leiarius
- Species: L. longibarbis

Binomial name
- Leiarius longibarbis (Castelnau, 1855)

Synonyms
- Arius longibarbis Castelnau, 1855

= Leiarius longibarbis =

Species of fish

Leiarius longibarbis, commonly as Marbled Pim, is a species of demersal catfish of the family Pimelodidae that is native to Guyana and Brazil.

It inhabits Rio Orinoco in Colombia and Venezuela, Rio Essequibo in Guyana, and the Amazon basin in Brazil, Peru and Bolivia.
