= Pimelodus coprophagus =

Conservation status
- Least Concern (IUCN 3.1)

Scientific classification
- Kingdom: Animalia
- Phylum: Chordata
- Class: Actinopterygii
- Order: Siluriformes
- Family: Pimelodidae
- Genus: Pimelodus
- Species: P. coprophagus

Binomial name
- Pimelodus coprophagus Schultz, 1944

Synonyms
- Pimelodus clarias Schultz, 1944

Species of fish

Pimelodus coprophagus is a fish in the family Pimelodidae. It is found in tropical freshwater in the Lake Maracaibo basin.
