= Pimelodus grosskopfii =

Conservation status
- Critically Endangered (IUCN 3.1)

Scientific classification
- Kingdom: Animalia
- Phylum: Chordata
- Class: Actinopterygii
- Order: Siluriformes
- Family: Pimelodidae
- Genus: Pimelodus
- Species: P. grosskopfii

Binomial name
- Pimelodus grosskopfii Steindachner, 1879

Synonyms
- Pimelodus grosskopfii navarroi Schultz, 1944; Pimelodus longifilis Posada, 1909

Species of fish

Pimelodus grosskopfii is a species of catfish in the family Pimelodidae. It is endemic to the Magdalena River and Lake Maracaibo basins in South America.
