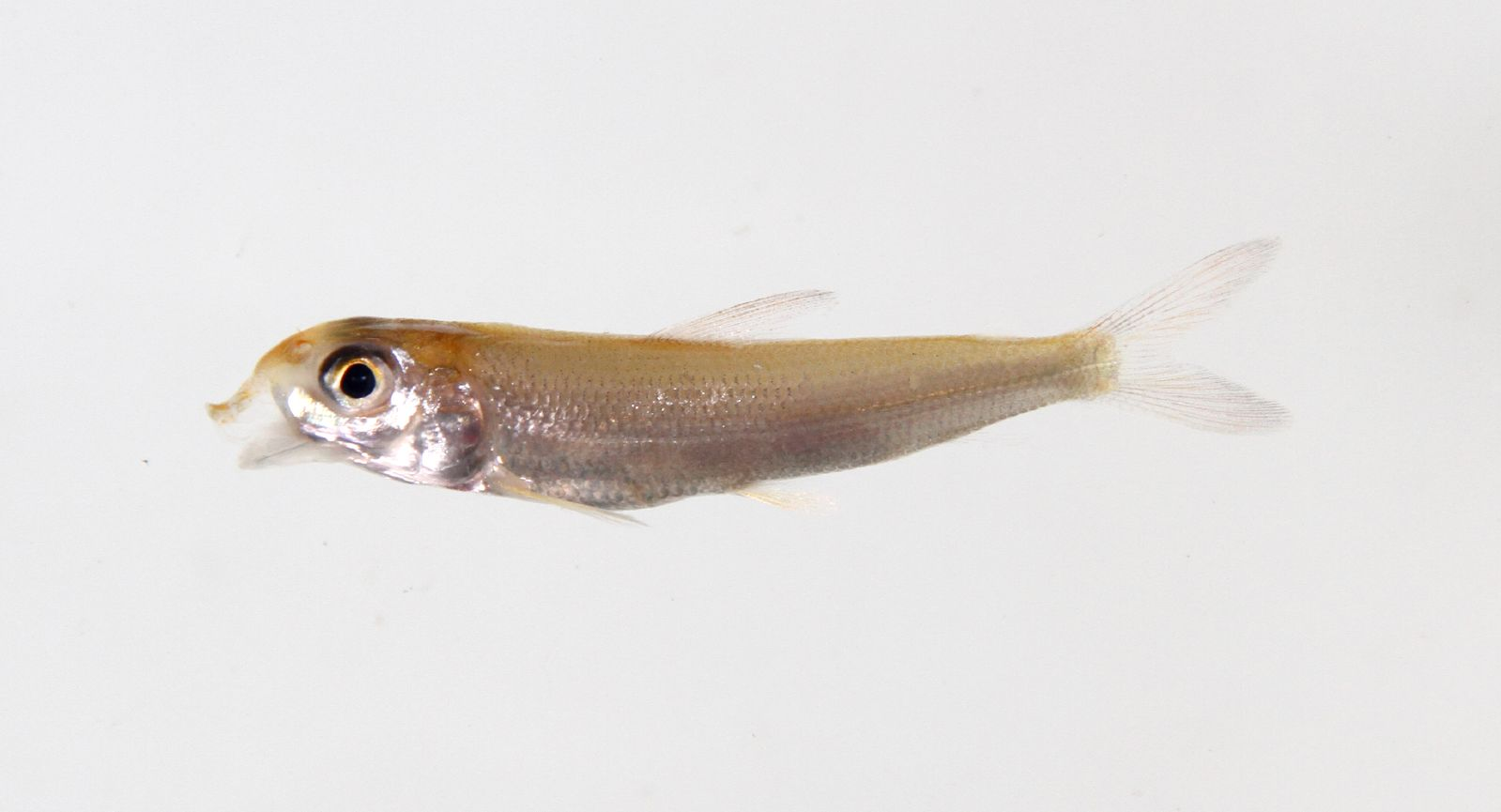
- Bivibranchia protractila, a synonym of B. fowleri

Scientific classification
- Kingdom: Animalia
- Phylum: Chordata
- Class: Actinopterygii
- Order: Characiformes
- Family: Hemiodontidae
- Genus: Bivibranchia; C. H. Eigenmann, 1912

Type species
- Bivibranchia protractila C. H. Eigenmann, 1912

Synonyms
- Atomaster C. H. Eigenmann & Myers, 1927

= Bivibranchia =

Genus of fishes

Bivibranchia s a genus of freshwater ray-finned fishes belonging to the family Hemiodontidae, the halftooths. The fishes in this genus are found in tropical South America.

== Species ==
Bivibranchia has the following species classified within it:

- Bivibranchia bimaculata Vari, 1985
- Bivibranchia fowleri (Steindachner, 1908)
- Bivibranchia notata Vari & Goulding, 1985
- Bivibranchia simulata Géry, Planquette & Le Bail, 1991
- Bivibranchia velox (C. H. Eigenmann & G. S. Myers, 1927)
