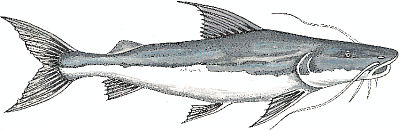

Conservation status
- Near Threatened (IUCN 3.1)

Scientific classification
- Kingdom: Animalia
- Phylum: Chordata
- Class: Actinopterygii
- Division: Teleostei
- Order: Siluriformes
- Family: Pimelodidae
- Genus: Brachyplatystoma
- Species: B. capapretum

Binomial name
- Brachyplatystoma capapretum Lundberg & Akama, 2005

= Brachyplatystoma capapretum =

Species of fish

Brachyplatystoma capapretum, the dark caped goliath catfish, Peru piraíba, false piraíba, or filhote da capa preta, is a species of catfish of the family Pimelodidae that is native to rivers of Brazil and Peru.

== Description ==
B. capapretum, described in 2005, was previously confused with B. filamentosum. These two species are very closely related, being sister species. They can be differentiated in premaxillary dentition, juvenile and adult coloration, and adult maxillary barbel length and caudal fin shape. Both species exhibit spotted juvenile stages, though in B. capapretum these spots are much larger than the eye, while in B. filamentosum these spots are about the same size as the eye. Also, the cross section of the caudal peduncle is rounded in these two species, as opposed to a deeper, thinner cross section in other Brachyplatystoma species. The adult B. capapretum has a very dark or even black dorsum (its species name is derived from Portuguese which means "black cape"), as opposed to the relatively lighter dorsal surface of B. filamentosum.

B. capapretum grows to a length of at least 58.1 centimetres (22.9 in) and a weight of 32.7 kilograms (72 lb)

== Distribution ==
It is a much widespread species that is found in large tributary rivers and lakes including Amazon River from Belém, Brazil upriver to at least Iquitos, Peru throughout Trombetas, Madeira, Negro, Manacapuru, Purus, Tefé, Juruá, Jutaí, and Içá.

== Ecology ==
The species is assumed to be ecologically similar to its sister, and most locals do not differentiate between the two. It is a freshwater benthopelagic fish inhabiting muddy waters and deeper, flowing channels. It is entirely piscivorous. Juveniles and sub adults are migratory. A few larvae were found upstream of the Madre de Dios river during a survey of ichthyoplankton done in December, though they were vastly outnumbered by other catfish larvae.
