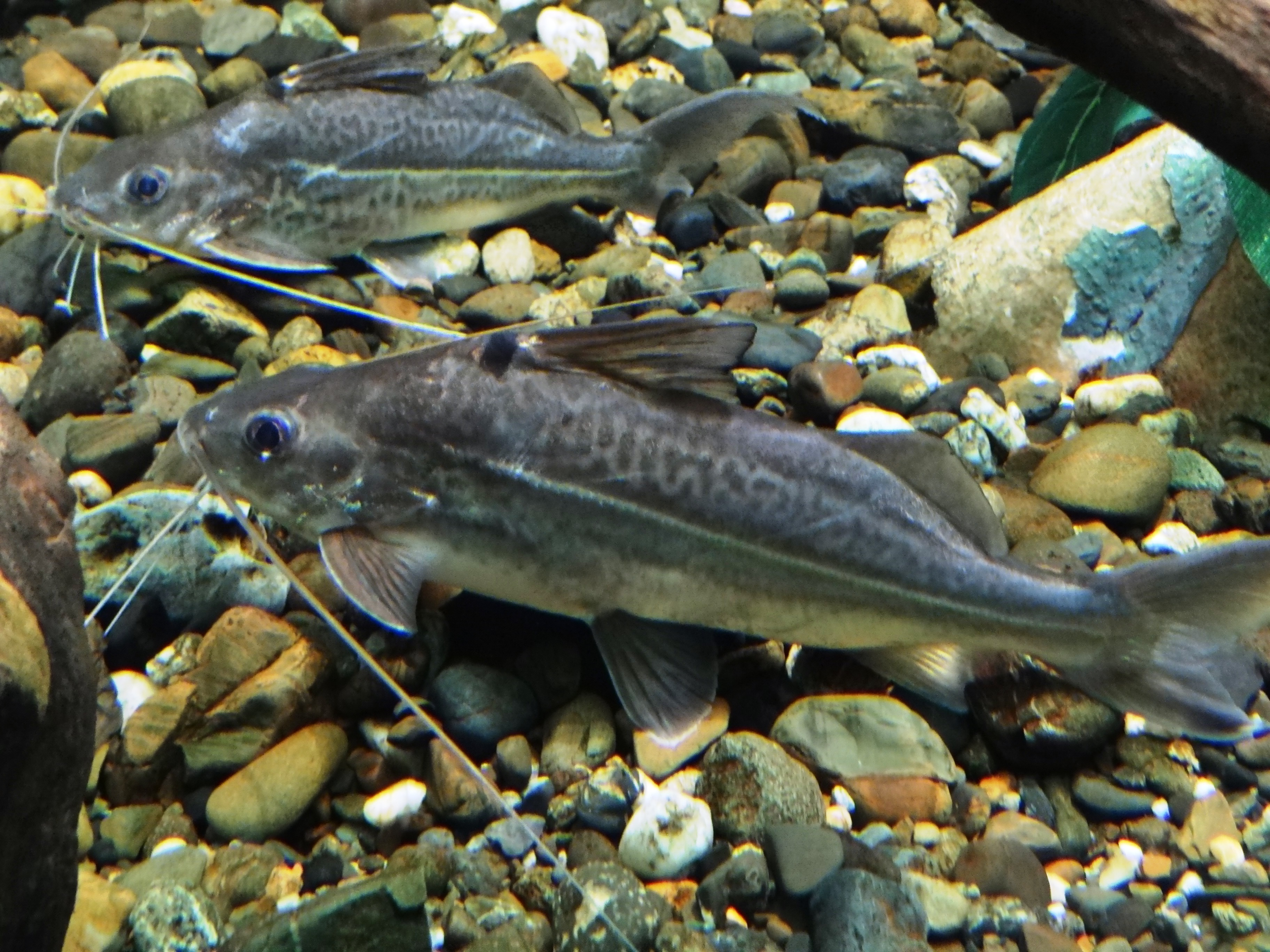

Conservation status
- Least Concern (IUCN 3.1)

Scientific classification
- Kingdom: Animalia
- Phylum: Chordata
- Class: Actinopterygii
- Order: Siluriformes
- Family: Pimelodidae
- Genus: Pimelodus
- Species: P. ornatus

Binomial name
- Pimelodus ornatus Kner, 1858

Synonyms
- Megalonema rhabdostigma Fowler, 1914

= Pimelodus ornatus =

Species of fish

Pimelodus ornatus, also known as the ornate pimelodus or the ornate pim, is a fish in the family Pimelodidae.

These fish can grow from 24 to 38.5 cm (9.4 to 15.2 in).

== Habitat ==
These fish live in the countries of Colombia, Venezuela, Guyana, Suriname, Ecuador, Peru, Brazil, Paraguay and Argentina
