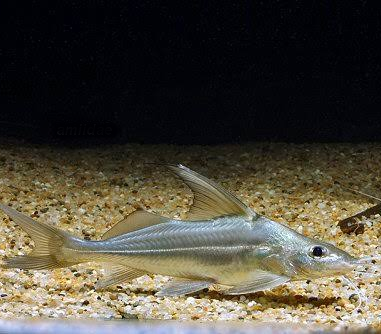

Conservation status
- Least Concern (IUCN 3.1)

Scientific classification
- Kingdom: Animalia
- Phylum: Chordata
- Class: Actinopterygii
- Order: Siluriformes
- Family: Pimelodidae
- Genus: Pimelodus
- Species: P. albicans

Binomial name
- Pimelodus albicans (Valenciennes, 1840)

Synonyms
- Silurus muticus Larrañaga, 1923; Arius albicans Valenciennes, 1840

= Pimelodus albicans =

Species of fish

Pimelodus albicans is a species of catfish in the family Pimelodidae. It is endemic to the Paraná River basin in Argentina.
