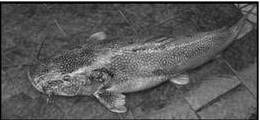

Conservation status
- Endangered (IUCN 3.1)

Scientific classification
- Kingdom: Animalia
- Phylum: Chordata
- Class: Actinopterygii
- Division: Teleostei
- Order: Siluriformes
- Family: Pimelodidae
- Genus: Steindachneridion
- Species: S. doceanum

Binomial name
- Steindachneridion doceanum (C. H. Eigenmann & Eigenmann, 1889)

Synonyms
- Steindachneridion doceana

= Steindachneridion doceanum =

Species of catfish

Steindachneridion doceanum, as known as surubim-do-doce in Brazilian Portuguese, is an endangered species of catfish of the family Pimelodidae that is native to the Doce River Basin, where it was originally common in the whole extension of the basin.

S. doceanum, the largest native species of the Doce River basin, can weigh up to 17 kilograms (37 lb) and inhabits the deepest parts of the river channels and its main tributaries.
