= Hypophthalmus oremaculatus =

Conservation status
- Least Concern (IUCN 3.1)

Scientific classification
- Kingdom: Animalia
- Phylum: Chordata
- Class: Actinopterygii
- Order: Siluriformes
- Family: Pimelodidae
- Genus: Hypophthalmus
- Species: H. oremaculatus

Binomial name
- Hypophthalmus oremaculatus Nani & Fuster, 1947

Species of fish

Hypophthalmus oremaculatus, is a species of demersal catfish of the family Pimelodidae that is native to Paraná River basin of Argentina and Brazil.
