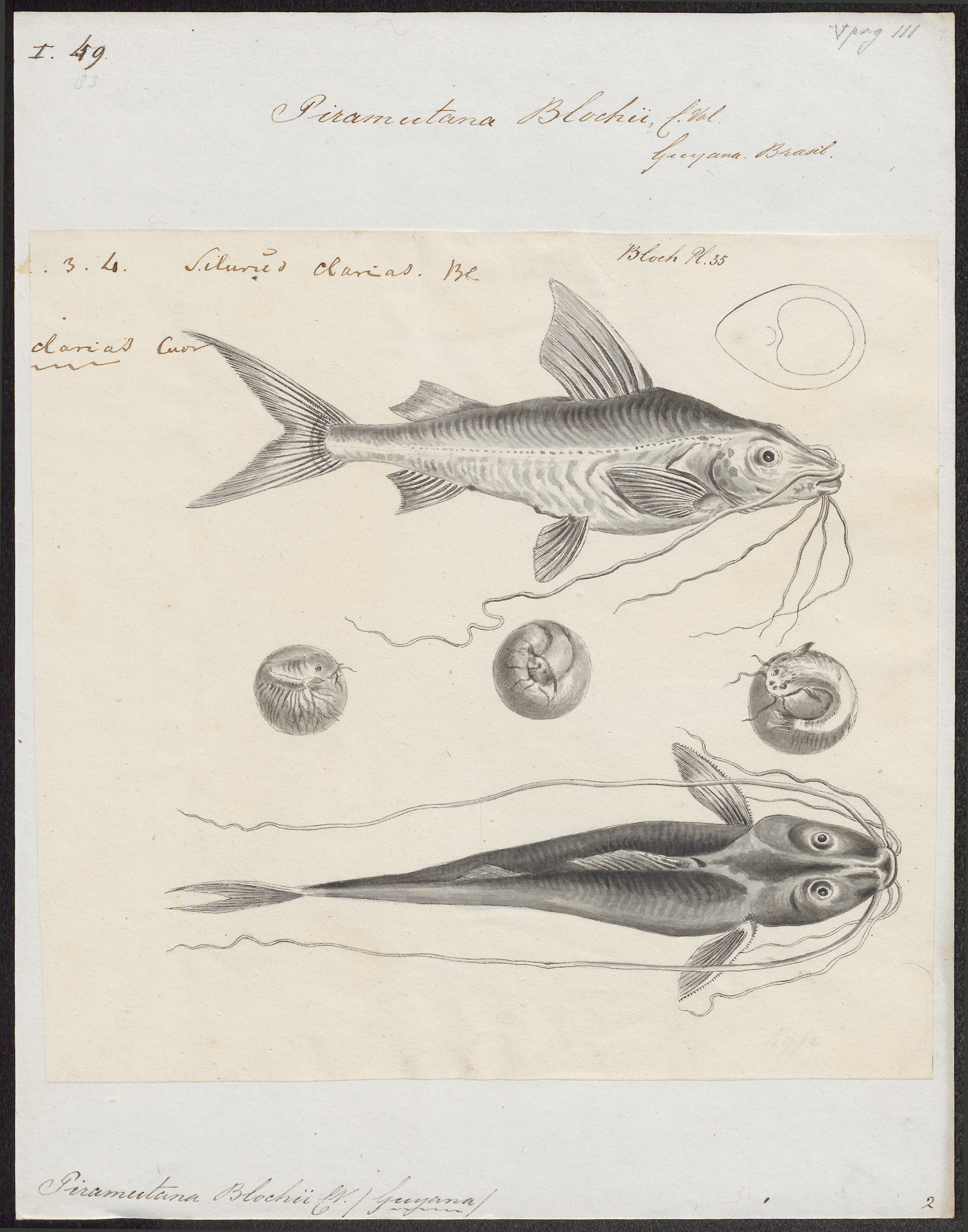

Conservation status
- Least Concern (IUCN 3.1)

Scientific classification
- Kingdom: Animalia
- Phylum: Chordata
- Class: Actinopterygii
- Order: Siluriformes
- Family: Pimelodidae
- Genus: Pimelodus
- Species: P. blochii

Binomial name
- Pimelodus blochii Valenciennes, 1840

Synonyms
- Pseudorhamdia piscatrix Cope, 1870; Pseudorhamdia macronema Bleeker, 1864; Pimelodus blochi Valenciennes, 1840

= Pimelodus blochii =

Species of fish

Pimelodus blochii, commonly the Bloch's catfish is a fish in the family Pimelodidae.
