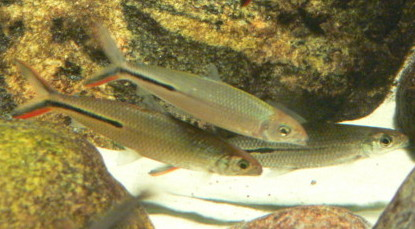
- Hemiodus gracilis

Scientific classification
- Kingdom: Animalia
- Phylum: Chordata
- Class: Actinopterygii
- Division: Teleostei
- Order: Characiformes
- Suborder: Characoidei
- Family: Hemiodontidae; Bleeker, 1859

Genera
- See the text

= Hemiodontidae =

Hemiodontidae Temporal range: Middle Miocene–present

Family of fishes

The Hemiodontidae are a small family of freshwater characins found in northern South America, south to the Paraná-Paraguay Basin. Hemiodontids can be distinguished from other characins by well-developed adipose eyelids over the eyes (except for the area above the pupil) and 9-11 branched rays in the pelvic fins. The larger species are popular food fish.

Hemiodontids have a fusiform or streamlined body shape; many are fast-swimming, and are able to leap out of the water to escape predators. Most species have a round spot on the side of the midbody and a stripe along the lower lobe of the caudal fin. The adults of all species except Micromischodus sugillatus have no teeth on their lower jaws. As for the other genera, Anodus apparently filter feeds with its dense and elongate gill rakers, Bivibranchia and Argonectes have protractile jaws, and Hemiodus has multicuspid teeth in the upper jaw. The largest hemiodontids are around 50 cm (20 in) in length.

Fossil remains of Hemiodus are known from the Middle Miocene-aged Pebas Formation of Peru.

== Genera ==
The family has around 29 known species, as well as several undescribed species, in five genera:

- Anodus Cuvier, 1829
- Argonectes Böhlke & Myers, 1956
- Bivibranchia C. H. Eigenmann, 1912
- Hemiodus Müller, 1842
- Micromischodus Roberts, 1971

The following cladogram is based on a 2023 analysis of Hemiodontid UCEs:

- Hemiodontidae
  - - - Hemiodus spp.
      - - - - Anodus elongatus
            - Micromischodus sugillatus
          - Anodus orinocensis
        - Hemiodus immaculatus
    - Argonectes spp.
  - Bivibranchia spp.
- - - Piaractus brachypomus
    - Serrasalmus compressus
  - Rhaphiodon vulpinus

The genus was considered to have four subfamilies in the 20th century, but this treatment is no longer widely used.
