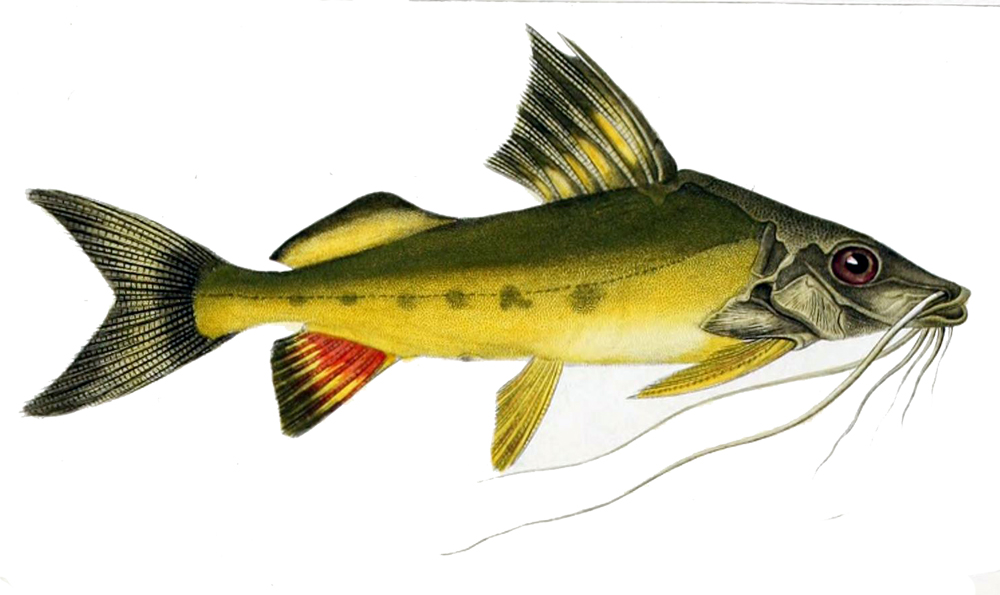

Conservation status
- Least Concern (IUCN 3.1)

Scientific classification
- Kingdom: Animalia
- Phylum: Chordata
- Class: Actinopterygii
- Division: Teleostei
- Order: Siluriformes
- Family: Pimelodidae
- Genus: Pimelodus
- Species: P. maculatus

Binomial name
- Pimelodus maculatus Lacépède, 1803

Synonyms
- Silurus lima Natterer, 1858; Pimelodus clarias Lacepède, 1803

= Pimelodus maculatus =

Species of fish

Pimelodus maculatus is a fish in the family Pimelodidae.
