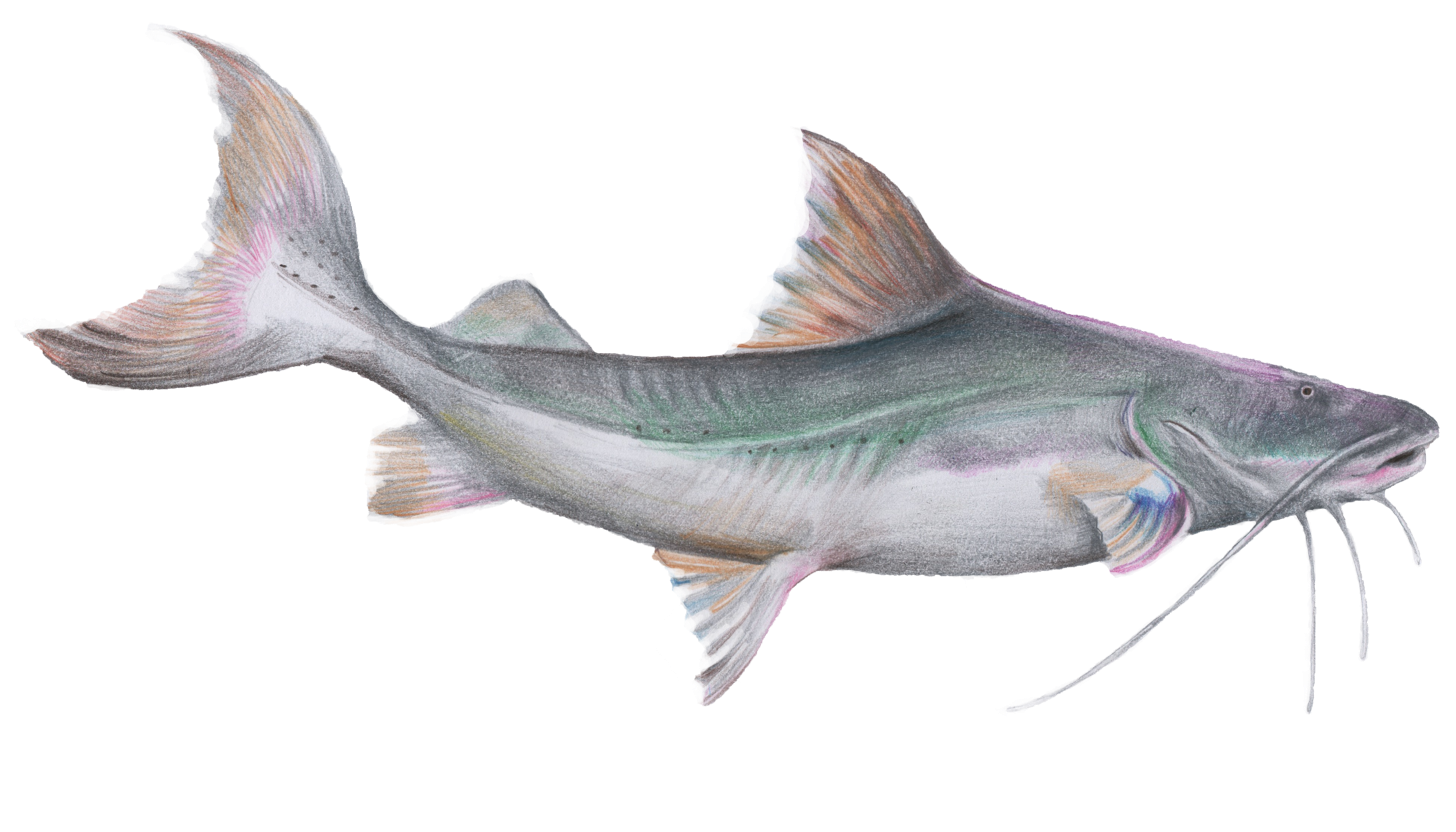

Conservation status
- Least Concern (IUCN 3.1)

Scientific classification
- Kingdom: Animalia
- Phylum: Chordata
- Class: Actinopterygii
- Order: Siluriformes
- Family: Pimelodidae
- Genus: Brachyplatystoma
- Species: B. vaillantii

Binomial name
- Brachyplatystoma vaillantii (Valenciennes, 1840)

Synonyms
- Bagrus piramuta; Bagrus reticulatus; Brachyplatystoma parnahybae; Piramutana piramuta; Platystoma vaillantii

= Brachyplatystoma vaillantii =

Species of fish

Brachyplatystoma vaillantii, the Laulao catfish, piramutaba or piramuta, is a species of catfish of the family Pimelodidae that is native to Amazon and Orinoco River basins and major rivers of the Guianas and northeastern Brazil.

== Etymology ==
The fish is named in honor of François Levaillant (1753-1824) a French explorer, naturalist and zoological collector, who brought the type specimens to Europe.

== Description ==
It grows to a length of 150 centimetres (59 in), though is more commonly 80 centimetres (31 in). Dorsum dark to light grey or brown, no spots or stripes. Ventrum much paler to give striking counter shading. It is the sister species to all other species in the genus, and the type species.

== Distribution ==
It is a much widespread species that is found in rivers and estuaries of Amazon and Orinoco watersheds, Guianas and northeastern Brazil.

== Ecology ==
It is found in both freshwater and brackish water systems. It is a demersal potamodromous fish commonly inhabits muddy waters and deeper, flowing channels. Developing young are carried downriver by the current, ending up in estuaries. Juveniles and sub adults are migratory. It is entirely piscivorous preying on loricariids and other bottom-dwelling fish.

== Relation to humans ==
B. vaillantii is extremely important for local fisheries, often being the most caught fish by weight in Brazil, with a peak recorded catch of 29 thousand tons in the 1970s. Afterwards, the piramutaba stocks had shown signs of depletion, and subsequent recovery.
