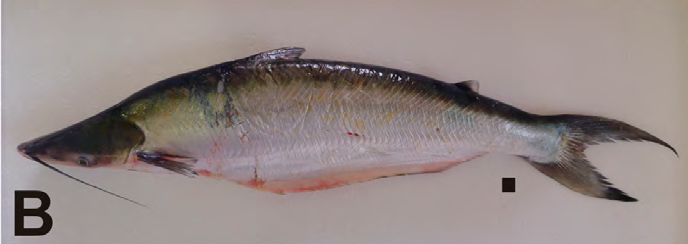
- Scale bar = 1 cm

Conservation status
- Least Concern (IUCN 3.1)

Scientific classification
- Kingdom: Animalia
- Phylum: Chordata
- Class: Actinopterygii
- Order: Siluriformes
- Family: Pimelodidae
- Genus: Hypophthalmus
- Species: H. marginatus

Binomial name
- Hypophthalmus marginatus Valenciennes, 1840

= Hypophthalmus marginatus =

Species of fish

Hypophthalmus marginatus, commonly called the Mapará, is a species of demersal potamodromous catfish of the family Pimelodidae that is native to Amazon and Orinoco River basins of Brazil, Peru and major rivers of French Guiana and Suriname.

== Description ==
It grows to a length of 55 cm (22 in).

== Ecology ==
A parasite of the esophageal musculature, Kudoa amazonica was found from the fish.
