= Pimelodus argenteus =

Conservation status
- Least Concern (IUCN 3.1)

Scientific classification
- Kingdom: Animalia
- Phylum: Chordata
- Class: Actinopterygii
- Order: Siluriformes
- Family: Pimelodidae
- Genus: Pimelodus
- Species: P. argenteus

Binomial name
- Pimelodus argenteus Perugia, 1891

Synonyms
- Pimelodus brevis Marini, Nichols & LaMonte, 1933

Species of fish

Pimelodus argenteus is a fish in the family Pimelodidae, which is distributed over the Paraguái and Lower and Middle Paraná River basins, occurring in Argentina, Bolivia, Brazil, Paraguay and Uruguay in South America.

The name is preoccupied by Pimelodus argenteus Lacepède 1803, which is a synonym of the Pemecou sea catfish (Sciades herzbergii) but retained as valid under Article 23.9.5
