= Pimelodus joannis =

Conservation status
- Data Deficient (IUCN 3.1)

Scientific classification
- Kingdom: Animalia
- Phylum: Chordata
- Class: Actinopterygii
- Order: Siluriformes
- Family: Pimelodidae
- Genus: Pimelodus
- Species: P. joannis

Binomial name
- Pimelodus joannis Ribeiro, Lucena & Lucinda, 2008

Species of fish

Pimelodus joannis is a species of catfish in the family Pimelodidae (the long-whiskered catfishes) endemic to Brazil, where it occurs in the Tocantins river basin. This species reaches 7.7 centimetres (3.0 in) in TL.
