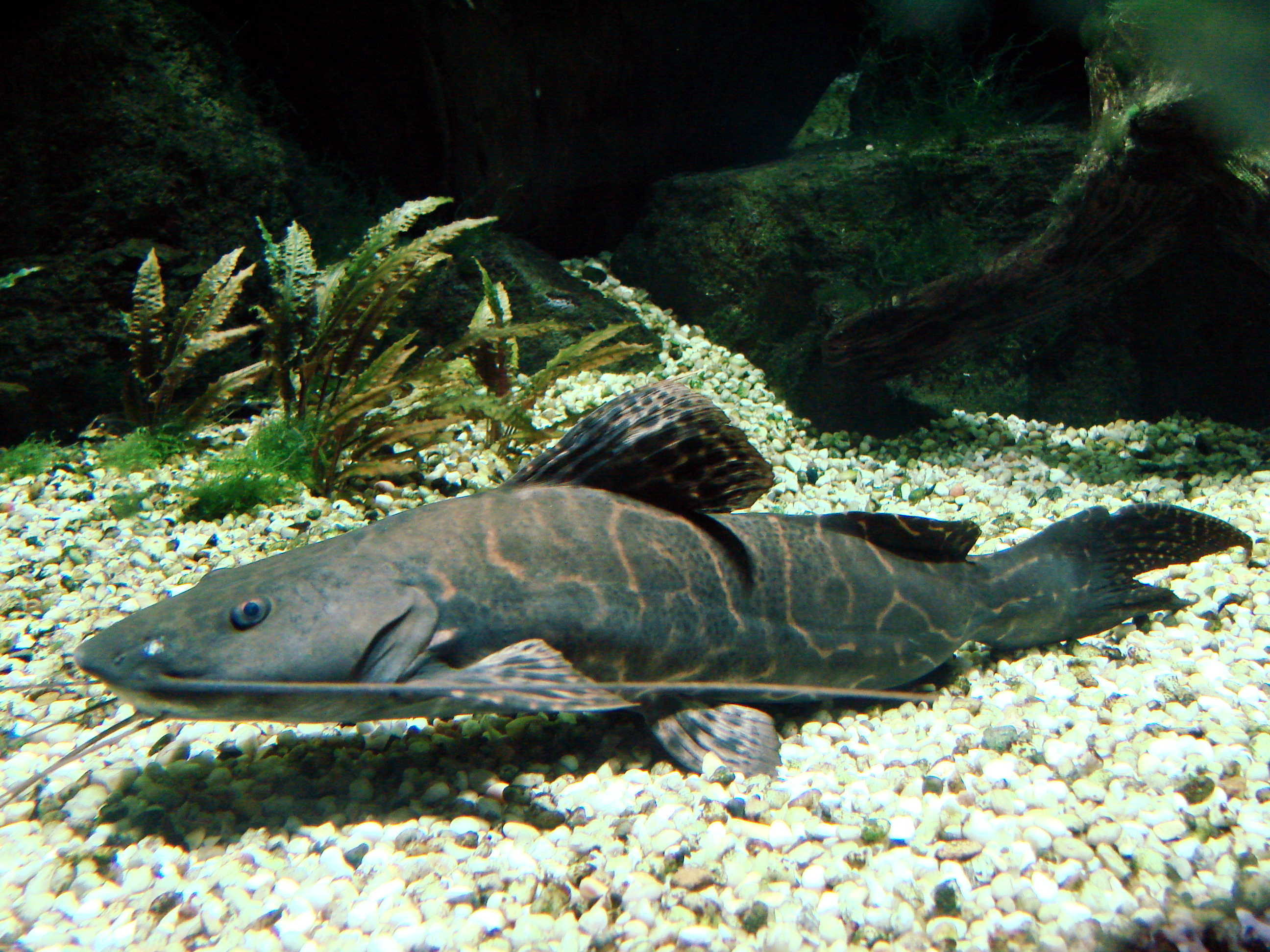

Conservation status
- Vulnerable (IUCN 3.1)

Scientific classification
- Kingdom: Animalia
- Phylum: Chordata
- Class: Actinopterygii
- Order: Siluriformes
- Family: Pimelodidae
- Genus: Leiarius
- Species: L. perruno

Binomial name
- Leiarius perruno (Schultz, 1944)

Synonyms
- Perrunichthys perruno

= Leiarius perruno =

Species of fish

Leiarius perruno is a species of catfish (order Siluriformes) that was first described in the monotypic genus Perrunichthys of the family Pimelodidae. It is sometimes called the leopard catfish. This species is native to Colombia and Venezuela, where it occurs in the Lake Maracaibo basin, and reaches a length of 60.0 centimetres (23.6 in) TL.
