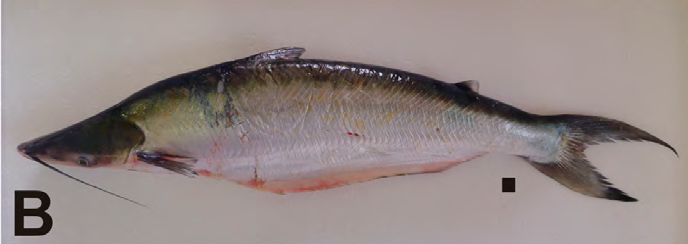
- Hypophthalmus marginatus (scale bar = 1 cm)

Scientific classification
- Kingdom: Animalia
- Phylum: Chordata
- Class: Actinopterygii
- Order: Siluriformes
- Family: Pimelodidae
- Genus: Hypophthalmus; Cuvier, 1829

Type species
- Hypophthalmus nuchalis Spix & Agassiz, 1829

Synonyms
- Hypophthalmus Spix & Agassiz, 1829; Notophthalmus Hyrtl, 1859; Pseudohypophthalmus Bleeker, 1862

= Hypophthalmus =

Genus of fishes

Hypophthalmus is a genus of long-whiskered catfishes native to freshwater in tropical and subtropical South America.

== Species ==
There are currently 6 recognized species in this genus:

- Hypophthalmus celiae Littman, Lundberg & Rocha, 2021
- Hypophthalmus donascimientoi Littman, Lundberg & Rocha, 2021
- Hypophthalmus edentatus Spix & Agassiz, 1829 (Highwaterman catfish)
- Hypophthalmus fimbriatus Kner, 1857
- Hypophthalmus marginatus Valenciennes, 1840
- Hypophthalmus oremaculatus Nani & Fuster, 1947

== Taxonomy ==
This genus has been classified within its own family Hypophthalmidae. However, it has since been reclassified as a member of Pimelodidae; it is thought to be most closely related to Parapimelodus.

== Distribution ==
H. edentatus is found in the Amazon and Orinoco River basins and Atlantic coastal rivers of Guyana and Suriname. H. fimbriatus inhabits the Amazon River at Santarém and Rio Negro basin in Brazil and Venezuela. H. marginatus originates from the Amazon and Orinoco River basins and major rivers of French Guiana and Suriname. H. oremaculatus is distributed in the Paraná River basin, Brazil and Argentina.

== Description ==
Fish of this genus have scaleless skin, three pairs of barbels (one maxillary and two mandibular), and small eyes located lateroventrally in a position about mid-length of the head. The body is laterally compressed, bearing a long-based anal fin that runs from the anus to the anterior margin of the caudal peduncle. The dorsal, pectoral, and pelvic fins have a narrow base and lack spines. The posterior margin of the caudal fin is either deeply forked or emarginate, depending on the species.

== Ecology ==
Hypophthalmus are unusual among Neotropical fishes in their habit of specialized plankton-feeding, collecting plankton by straining water over the fine sieve created by numerous long, thin gill rakers. H. edentatus feeds primarily on cladocerans, copepods, and ostracods. It also feeds on debris and other plankton. H. fimbriatus has a diet consisting primarily of zooplankton, especially cladocerans and copepods. On the other hand, H. marginatus feeds primarily on phytoplankton. H. edentatus appears to follow the vertical movement of plankton throughout the day.

H. edentatus is a pelagic species which lives in schools near the surface of the water over muddy bottoms. Ovaries start to develop in November when the water level starts to rise. Fractional spawning occurs between February and April. The female lays down 50,000 to 100,000 eggs according to body weight. Juveniles inhabit the lower part of streams in estuaries, while adults are found more upstream.

H. edentatus and H. marginatus are more common in clear and whitewater habitats and are extremely limited or nonexistent in blackwater habitats. H. edentatus and H. marginatus occur in some of the same habitats; however, H. marginatus are more common in river and creek channel habitats while H. edentatus are more common from aquatic floodplains, including seasonally flooded lagoons. H. marginatus has a forked caudal fin, which is more efficient in a habitat with faster moving water. H. edentatus has an emarginate caudal fin, which is less vulnerable to fin-nipping by piranhas which are more abundant in slow-moving waters. H. fimbriatus may be restricted to blackwater habitats. H. edentatus are most common in lagoons and floodplains during the dry season, and move into flooded savannas during the rainy season. H. marginatus prefers to stay in larger, permanent water bodies.

== Fishing ==
Hypophthalmus support important fisheries. Based on a review by IBAMA, they are the 9th most caught fish by weight in the Brazilian Amazon.
