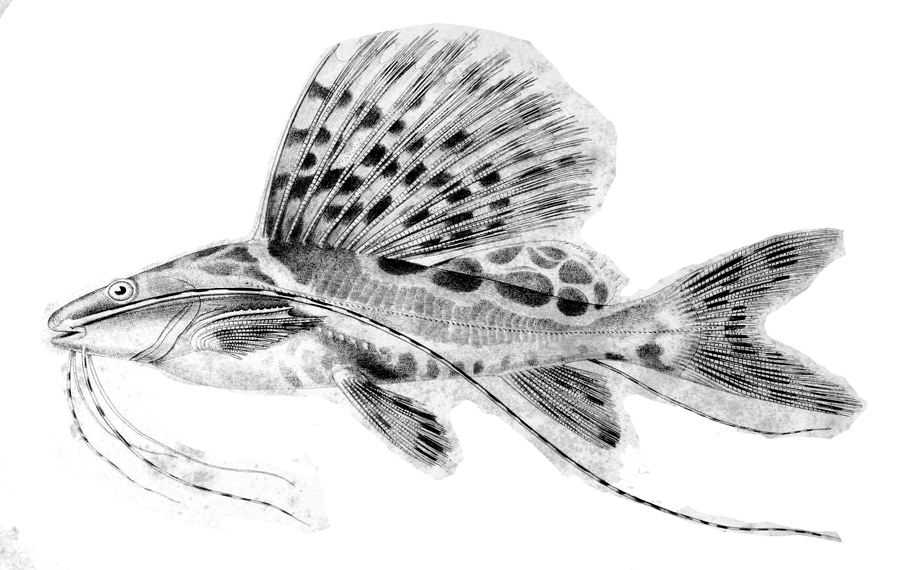

Conservation status
- Least Concern (IUCN 3.1)

Scientific classification
- Kingdom: Animalia
- Phylum: Chordata
- Class: Actinopterygii
- Order: Siluriformes
- Family: Pimelodidae
- Genus: Leiarius
- Species: L. pictus

Binomial name
- Leiarius pictus (Müller & Troschel, 1849)

Synonyms
- Bagrus pictus; Sciades pictus

= Leiarius pictus =

Species of fish

Leiarius pictus, commonly as sailfin pim, painted catfish or saddle catfish, is a species of demersal catfish of the family Pimelodidae that is native to Amazon, Essequibo, and Orinoco River basins of Colombia, Venezuela, Peru and Brazil.
