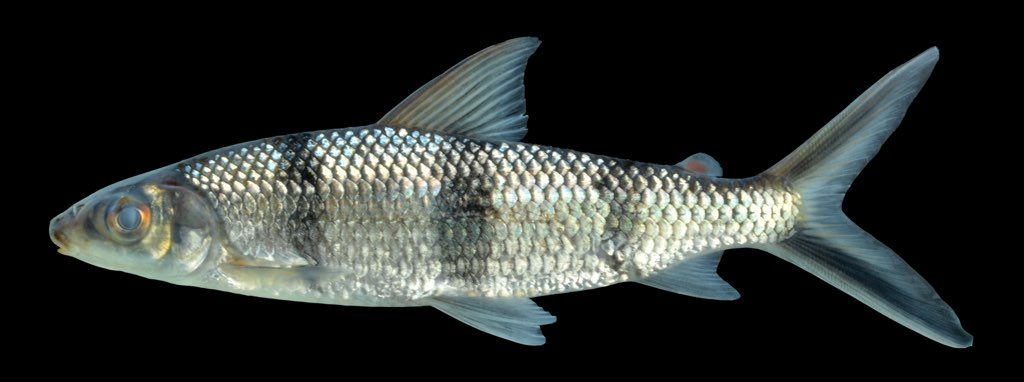
- Hemiodus quadrimaculatus

Scientific classification
- Kingdom: Animalia
- Phylum: Chordata
- Class: Actinopterygii
- Division: Teleostei
- Order: Characiformes
- Family: Hemiodontidae
- Genus: Hemiodus; J. P. Müller, 1842

Type species
- Hemiodus crenidens Müller, 1842

Synonyms
- Anisitsia C. H. Eigenmann & C. H. Kennedy, 1903; Hemiodopsis Fowler, 1906; Pterohemiodus Fowler, 1940

= Hemiodus =

Hemiodus Temporal range: Middle Miocene–present

Genus of fishes

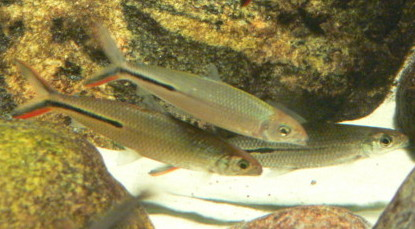
Hemiodus gracilis

Hemiodus is a genus of halftooths from South America, with some species known as flying fish (though they are not related to marine flying fish (Exocoetidae)). Their greatest species richness is in the Amazon Basin, but are also found in the Orinoco, Essequibo, Paraná–Paraguay and Parnaíba River basins. Depending on the species involved, these elongate fish reach a length of 7–30 cm (3–12 in). At least one species is known to reproduce during (austral) spring and summer.

Fossil remains are known from the Middle Miocene-aged Pebas Formation of Peru.

== Species ==
Hemiodus has the following species classified within it:

- Hemiodus amazonum (Humboldt, 1821)
- Hemiodus argenteus Pellegrin, 1909
- Hemiodus atranalis (Fowler, 1940)
- Hemiodus bimaculatus Nogueira, Langeani & Netto‐Ferreira, 2019
- Hemiodus goeldii Steindachner, 1908
- Hemiodus gracilis Günther, 1864
- Hemiodus huraulti (Géry, 1964)
- Hemiodus immaculatus Kner, 1858
- Hemiodus iratapuru Langeani & C. L. R. Moreira, 2013
- Hemiodus jatuarana Langeani, 2004
- Hemiodus langeanii Beltrão & Zuanon, 2012
- Hemiodus microlepis Kner, 1858
- Hemiodus ocellatus (Vari, 1982)
- Hemiodus orthonops C. H. Eigenmann & C. H. Kennedy, 1903
- Hemiodus parnaguae C. H. Eigenmann & Henn, 1916
- Hemiodus quadrimaculatus Pellegrin, 1909 (Barred hemiodus)
- Hemiodus semitaeniatus Kner, 1858 (Halfline hemiodus)
- Hemiodus sterni (Géry, 1964)
- Hemiodus ternetzi G. S. Myers, 1927
- Hemiodus thayeria J. E. Böhlke, 1955
- Hemiodus tocantinensis Langeani, 1999
- Hemiodus tucupi Silva, Nogueira, Netto-Ferreira, Akama & Dutra, 2020
- Hemiodus unimaculatus (Bloch, 1794)
- Hemiodus vorderwinkleri (Géry, 1964)
