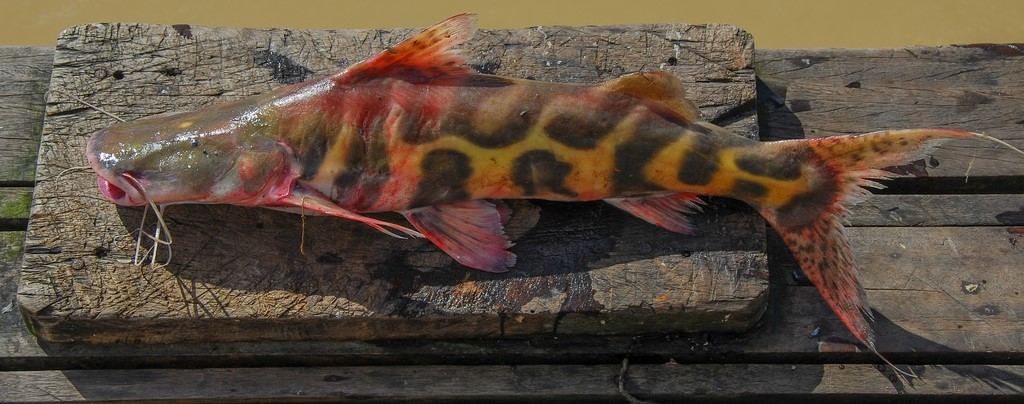

Conservation status
- Least Concern (IUCN 3.1)

Scientific classification
- Kingdom: Animalia
- Phylum: Chordata
- Class: Actinopterygii
- Order: Siluriformes
- Family: Pimelodidae
- Genus: Brachyplatystoma
- Species: B. juruense

Binomial name
- Brachyplatystoma juruense (Boulenger, 1898)

= Brachyplatystoma juruense =

Zebra catfish

Species of fish

The zebra catfish (Brachyplatystoma juruense) also or known as Juruense catfish, Gold Zebra Pim or False Tigrinus is a species of catfish of the family Pimelodidae that is native to Amazon and Orinoco River basin of Peri and Rio Juruá, northwestern Brazil, as well as Peru and Venezuela.

It grows to a length of 60 cm (24 in).
