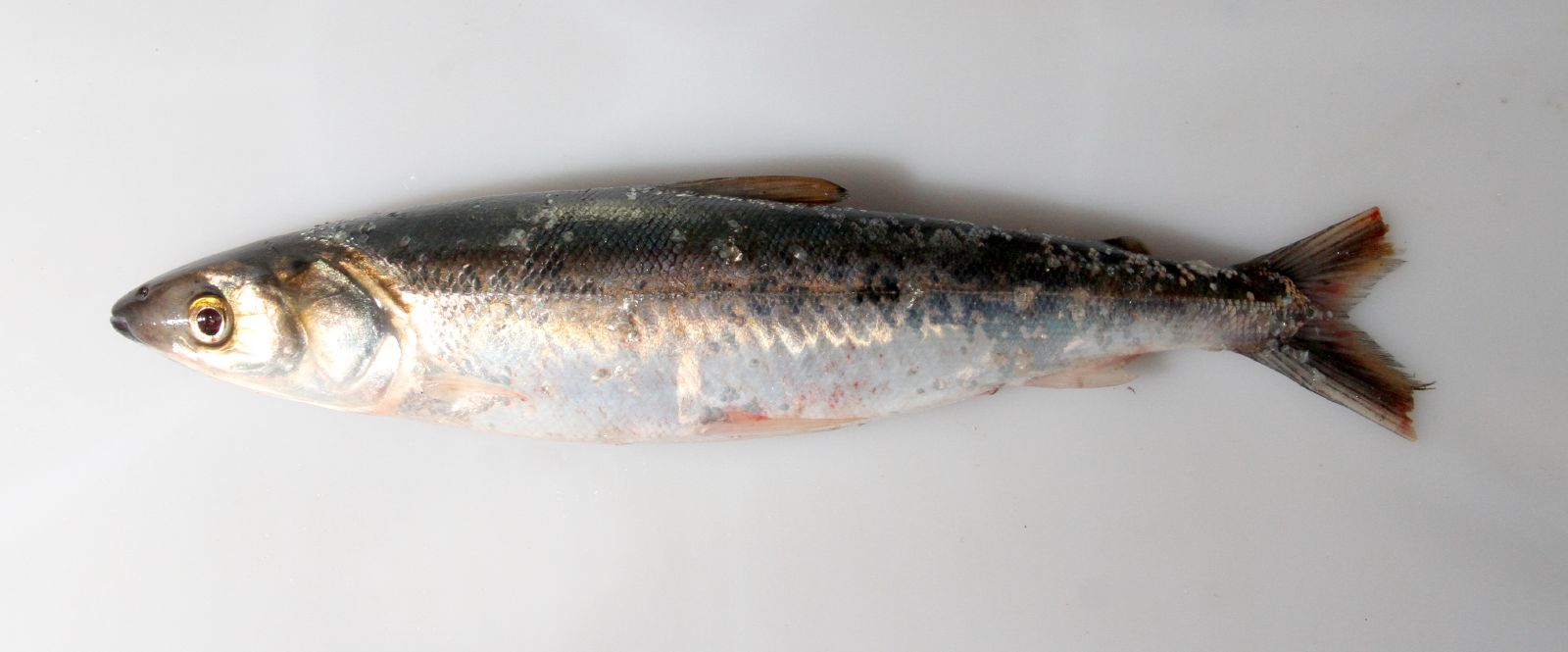

Scientific classification
- Kingdom: Animalia
- Phylum: Chordata
- Class: Actinopterygii
- Order: Characiformes
- Family: Hemiodontidae
- Genus: Anodus; Cuvier, 1829

Type species
- Anodus elongatus Agassiz, 1829

Synonyms
- Anodus Spix, 1829; Elopomorphus Gill, 1878; Eigenmannina Fowler, 1906

= Anodus =

Genus of fishes

Anodus is a genus of freshwater ray-finned fishes belonging to the family Hemiodontidae, the halftooths. The fishes in this genus are found in tropical South America.

== Species ==
Anodus has the following species classified within it:

- Anodus elongatus Agassiz, 1829
- Anodus orinocensis (Steindachner, 1887)
