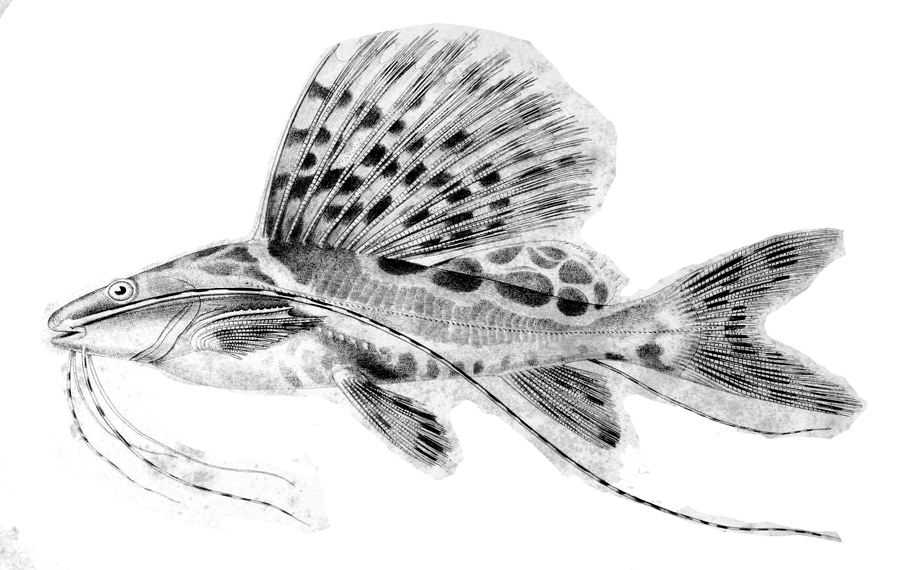
- Leiarius pictus

Scientific classification
- Kingdom: Animalia
- Phylum: Chordata
- Class: Actinopterygii
- Order: Siluriformes
- Family: Pimelodidae
- Genus: Leiarius; Bleeker, 1862

Type species
- Arius? longibarbis Castelnau, 1855

Synonyms
- Notoglanis Günther, 1864; Perrunichthys Schultz, 1944; Sciadeoides C. H. Eigenmann & Eigenmann, 1888

= Leiarius =

Genus of fishes

Leiarius is a genus of long-whiskered catfishes native to South America. Most of the genus' species are found in the aquarium hobby as ornamental fish.

== Species ==
There are currently four recognized species in this genus:

- Leiarius arekaima (Jardine, 1841) (Tiger pim) Species inquirenda
- Leiarius longibarbis (Castelnau, 1855)
- Leiarius marmoratus (T. N. Gill, 1870) (Marbled catfish, Marbled pim)
- Leiarius pictus (Müller & Troschel, 1849) (Marbled sailfin catfish, Sailfin pim)
- Leiarius perruno (Schultz, 1944) (Leopard catfish)

== Anatomy and physiology ==
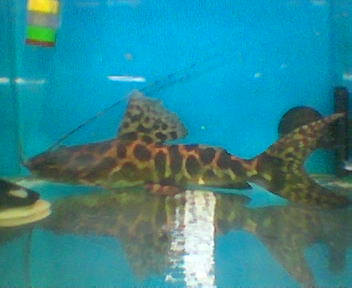
Leiarius longibarbis

L. marmoratus can reach a little more than 100 centimetres (39 in) TL and has a maximum published weight of about 12 kilograms (26 lb). L. pictus grows to 60 cm (24 in) TL.

These two species can be easily confused. The body of L. pictus is brown with darker brown spots, with a paler ventral coloring. In juvenile L. pictus, two parallel, pale bands curve from the dorsal fin down the body towards the caudal fin. In young fish of both species, the maxillary barbels are very long and ringed with black and white. As both of these species grow, their barbels will shorten in proportion to their size, and the caudal fin lobes, which are rounded in the young, become much more pointed. As L. marmoratus grows older, it darkens and its dark spots develop into a marbled pattern. Both species have a large, sail-like dorsal fin.

There are no external sexual differences.

== Range and distribution ==
L. marmoratus is found in the Amazon, Essequibo, and Orinoco River basins. On the other hand, L. pictus is only found in the Amazon and Orinoco River basins.

== Ecology ==
L. marmoratus inhabits riverbeds, deep wells, and lakes. Young or sub-adults form large schools. This species prefers to lay over rock and tree trunks during the day, being more active at sunrise, sunset, and night.

== Importance to humans ==
=== In aquaria ===
Both L. marmoratus and L. pictus are ornamental fish kept as pets in the aquarium hobby. They have a voracious appetite and can grow rapidly, and therefore should be kept in a very large aquarium. These fish are peaceful towards other large fish. Some sort of retreat to allow these fish to hide during the day is required. These fish get very large and are not recommended for the average aquarist.

== See also ==
- List of freshwater aquarium fish species

== Bibliography ==
- Froese, Rainer; Pauly, Daniel (eds.). "Species in genus Leiarius". FishBase. January 2009 version.
