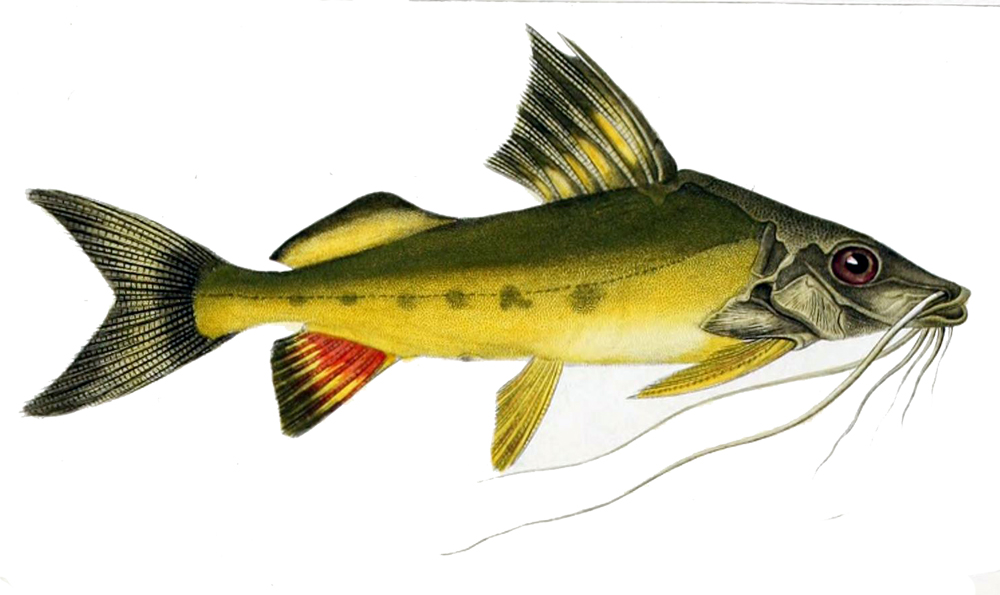
- Pimelodus maculatus

Scientific classification
- Kingdom: Animalia
- Phylum: Chordata
- Class: Actinopterygii
- Division: Teleostei
- Order: Siluriformes
- Family: Pimelodidae
- Genus: Pimelodus; Lacépède, 1803

Type species
- Pimelodus maculatus Lacépède, 1803

= Pimelodus =

Genus of fishes

Pimelodus is a genus of fish in the family Pimelodidae native to Central and South America.

== Species ==
There are currently 36 recognized species in this genus:

- Pimelodus absconditus Azpelicueta, 1995
- Pimelodus albicans (Valenciennes, 1840)
- Pimelodus albofasciatus Mees, 1974
- Pimelodus altissimus C. H. Eigenmann & Pearson, 1942
- Pimelodus argenteus Perugia, 1891
- Pimelodus atrobrunneus Vidal & C. A. S. de Lucena, 1999
- Pimelodus blochii Valenciennes, 1840
- Pimelodus britskii Garavello & Shibatta, 2007
- Pimelodus coprophagus L. P. Schultz, 1944
- Pimelodus crypticus Villa-Navarro & Cala, 2017
- Pimelodus fur (Lütken, 1874)
- Pimelodus garciabarrigai Dahl, 1961
- Pimelodus grosskopfii Steindachner, 1879
- Pimelodus halisodous F. R. V. Ribeiro, C. A. S. de Lucena & P. H. F. Lucinda, 2008
- Pimelodus jivaro C. H. Eigenmann & Pearson, 1942
- Pimelodus joannis F. R. V. Ribeiro, C. A. S. de Lucena & P. H. F. Lucinda, 2008
- Pimelodus luciae M. S. Rocha & F. R. V. Ribeiro, 2010
- Pimelodus maculatus Lacépède, 1803
- Pimelodus microstoma Steindachner, 1877
- Pimelodus multicratifer F. R. V. Ribeiro, C. A. S. de Lucena & Oyakawa, 2011
- Pimelodus mysteriosus Azpelicueta, 1998
- Pimelodus navarroi L. P. Schultz, 1944
- Pimelodus ornatus Kner, 1858
- Pimelodus ortmanni Haseman, 1911
- Pimelodus pantaneiro Souza-Filho & Shibatta, 2007
- Pimelodus paranaensis Britski & Langeani, 1988
- Pimelodus pictus Steindachner, 1876
- Pimelodus pintado Azpelicueta, Lundberg & Loureiro, 2008
- Pimelodus platicirris Borodin, 1927
- Pimelodus pohli F. R. V. Ribeiro & C. A. S. de Lucena, 2006
- Pimelodus punctatus (Meek & Hildebrand, 1913)
- Pimelodus quadratus P. H. F. Lucinda, F. R. V. Ribeiro & C. A. S. de Lucena, 2016
- Pimelodus speciosus Costa e Silva, Ribeiro, Lucena & Lucinda, 2018
- Pimelodus stewarti F. R. V. Ribeiro, C. A. S. de Lucena & P. H. F. Lucinda, 2008
- Pimelodus tetramerus F. R. V. Ribeiro & C. A. S. de Lucena, 2006
- Pimelodus yuma Villa-Navarro & Acero P., 2017

Synonyms

- Pimelodus brevis Marini, Nichols & La Monte, 1933; valid as P. argenteus
