= Bergiaria platana =

Conservation status
- Least Concern (IUCN 3.1)

Scientific classification
- Kingdom: Animalia
- Phylum: Chordata
- Class: Actinopterygii
- Order: Siluriformes
- Family: Pimelodidae
- Genus: Bergiaria
- Species: B. platana

Binomial name
- Bergiaria platana (Steindachner, 1908)

Synonyms
- Bergiella platana Steindachner, 1908; Iheringichthys platanus (Steindachner, 1908)

Species of fish

Bergiaria platana is a species of long-whiskered catfish endemic to Argentina where it occurs in the Paraná River basin. This species grows to a length of 9.1 centimetres (3.6 in) SL.
