= Petulanos plicatus =

Conservation status
- Least Concern (IUCN 3.1)

Scientific classification
- Kingdom: Animalia
- Phylum: Chordata
- Class: Actinopterygii
- Order: Characiformes
- Family: Anostomidae
- Genus: Petulanos
- Species: P. plicatus

Binomial name
- Petulanos plicatus (C. H. Eigenmann, 1912)

Synonyms
- Anastomus plicatus C. H. Eigenmann, 1912

Species of fish

Petulanos plicatus is a species of freshwater ray-finned fish belonging to the family Anostomidae, the toothed headstanders. This species is found in Guyana and Suriname.

== Taxonomy ==
Petulanos plicatus was first formally described as Anostomus plicatus in 1912 by the German-American ichthyologist Carl H. Eigenmann, with its type locality given as Crab Falls on the Essequibo River in Guyana. In 2008, Brian L. Sidlauskas and Richard P. Vari proposed the new genus Petulanos and designated A. plicatus as its type species. The genus Petulanos is classified in the subfamily Anostominae of the family Anostomidae, the headstanders, in the suborder Characoidei of the order Characiformes.

== Etymology ==
Petulanos plicatus is the type species of the genus Petulanos, a name derived from the Latin word petulans, meaning "impudent" or "petulant", with the first four letters of the genus name Anostomus suffixed to it. This is a reference to the upturned mouth of the fishes in this genus, creating the appearance of a pout. The specific name, plicatus, means "folded", which may refer to the folds of skin on this species' lips.

== Description ==
Petulanos plicatus has an elongated and lateral compressed body, with a broad head and a mouth which points upwards. The overall colour is greyish or brown, with dark spots along the body. This species reaches a maximum standard length of 9.5 cm (3.7 in).

== Distribution and habitat ==
Petulanos plicatus is endemic to the drainage basin of the Essequibo River in Guyana and western Suriname, where it occurs in densely vegetated stretches.
