= Abramites eques =

Conservation status
- Least Concern (IUCN 3.1)

Scientific classification
- Kingdom: Animalia
- Phylum: Chordata
- Class: Actinopterygii
- Order: Characiformes
- Family: Anostomidae
- Genus: Abramites
- Species: A. eques

Binomial name
- Abramites eques (Steindachner, 1878)

Synonyms
- Leporinus eques Steindachner, 1878

Species of fish

Abramites eques, also known as the headstander, picúo, or sardina, is a small teleost fish. It is a member of the family Anostomidae of the order Characiformes. This South American species, like Abramites hypselonotus, adopts a head-down swimming posture due to its distinct feeding habit, which is a direct result of the locals that it frequents.

== Description ==
Mature females tend to be plumper than the males.

== Geographical distribution and habitat ==
This fish inhabits the Magdalena River basin in Colombia. Like its relative, Abramites hypselonotus, the picúo generally inhabits shallow, fast-moving rivers and streams, and refers rocky bottoms.

== Aquarium care ==
If any plants are added to an aquarium with the picúo, the fish will likely eat them. Hardy plants like the Java fern should survive, but the addition of delicate species should be avoided. Branches or roots should be added to the tank to provide hiding places for the fish, and soft, acidic water should be provided. They can be an aggressive species, so only keep with tank mates that can look after themselves. During mating, this species forms distinct pairs. They prefer to breed in dense patches of quartic weeds.

=== Feeding ===
A vegetable diet is best suited for the picúo. Algae wafers, pellets and high-quality flake food can be given. Spinach and peas will also benefit the picúo.

== Relationship with humans ==
Given its preference for shallow streams and rivers, this species' range is very fragmented. While it has been assessed to the level of Least Concern by the IUCN, a number of threats to wild picúos still exist, such as mining and quarrying, deforestation in its home watershed, and dredging of waterways.

In captivity, this species is primarily used as an ornamental fish in the aquarium trade.
