= Sartor tucuruiense =

Conservation status
- Endangered (IUCN 3.1)

Scientific classification
- Kingdom: Animalia
- Phylum: Chordata
- Class: Actinopterygii
- Order: Characiformes
- Family: Anostomidae
- Genus: Sartor
- Species: S. tucuruiense

Binomial name
- Sartor tucuruiense dos Santos & Jégu, 1987

Species of fish

Sartor tucuruiense is a species of headstander endemic to Brazil. It is found in the Tocantins River basin in Brazil. This species reaches a length of 11 cm (4.3 in).
