= Striped headstander =

Striped headstander may refer to the fish species:

- Anostomus anostomus, the striped anostomus or striped anastomus
- Abramites hypselonotus, the marbled headstander or high-backed headstander
