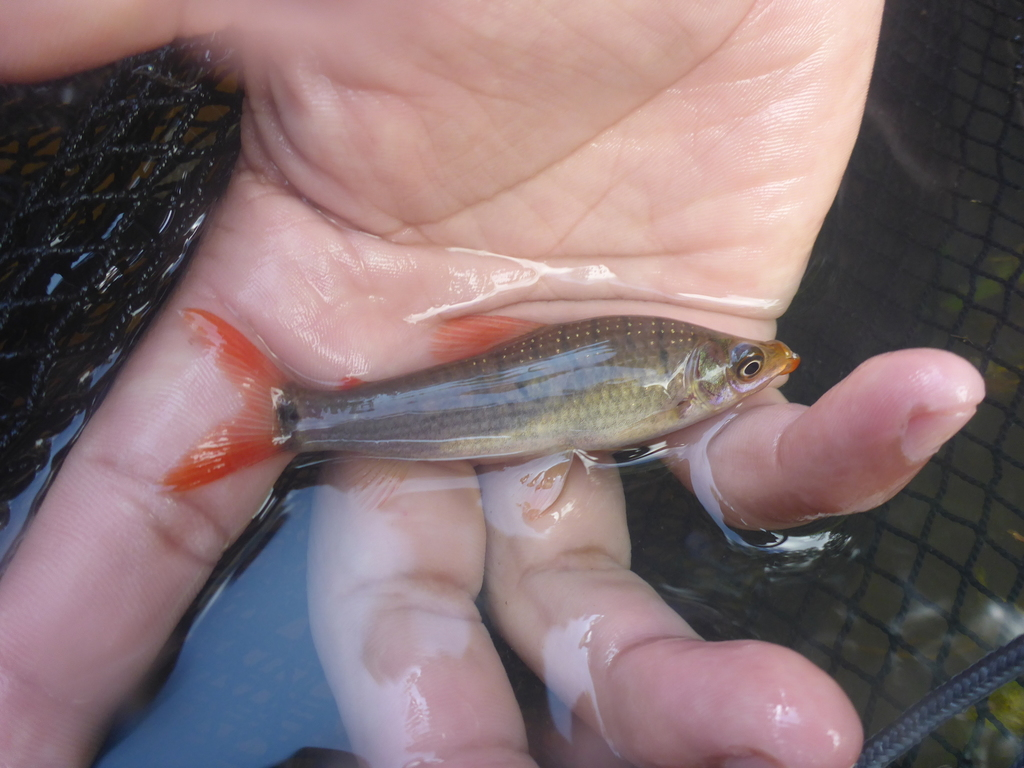

Conservation status
- Least Concern (IUCN 3.1)

Scientific classification
- Kingdom: Animalia
- Phylum: Chordata
- Class: Actinopterygii
- Order: Characiformes
- Family: Anostomidae
- Genus: Pseudanos
- Species: P. trimaculatus

Binomial name
- Pseudanos trimaculatus (Kner, 1858)

Synonyms
- Schizodon trimaculatus Kner, 1858; Anostomus trimaculatus (Kner, 1858); Pseudanos irinae Winterbottom, 1980

= Pseudanos trimaculatus =

Species of fish

Pseudanos trimaculatus, the threespot headstander, is a species of headstander found in Argentina, Brazil, Guyana and Peru.

Pseudanos trimaculatus exhibits a degree of geographical variation, with specimens found in the Amazon basin exhibiting much more conspicuous black spots at the center of their scales than their Essequibo or Orinoco basin counterparts
