= Chilodontidae =

Chilodontidae is a taxonomic name that has been given to three families:

- Chilodontidae, a former family name for a group within the Ciliophora, now suppressed by an ICZN ruling in 2024
- Chilodontidae (formerly "Chilodontaidae" - nomen nudum), a family of gastropods from the order Seguenziida
- Chilodidae (formerly "Chilodontidae"), a small family of ray-finned fishes from the order Characiformes
