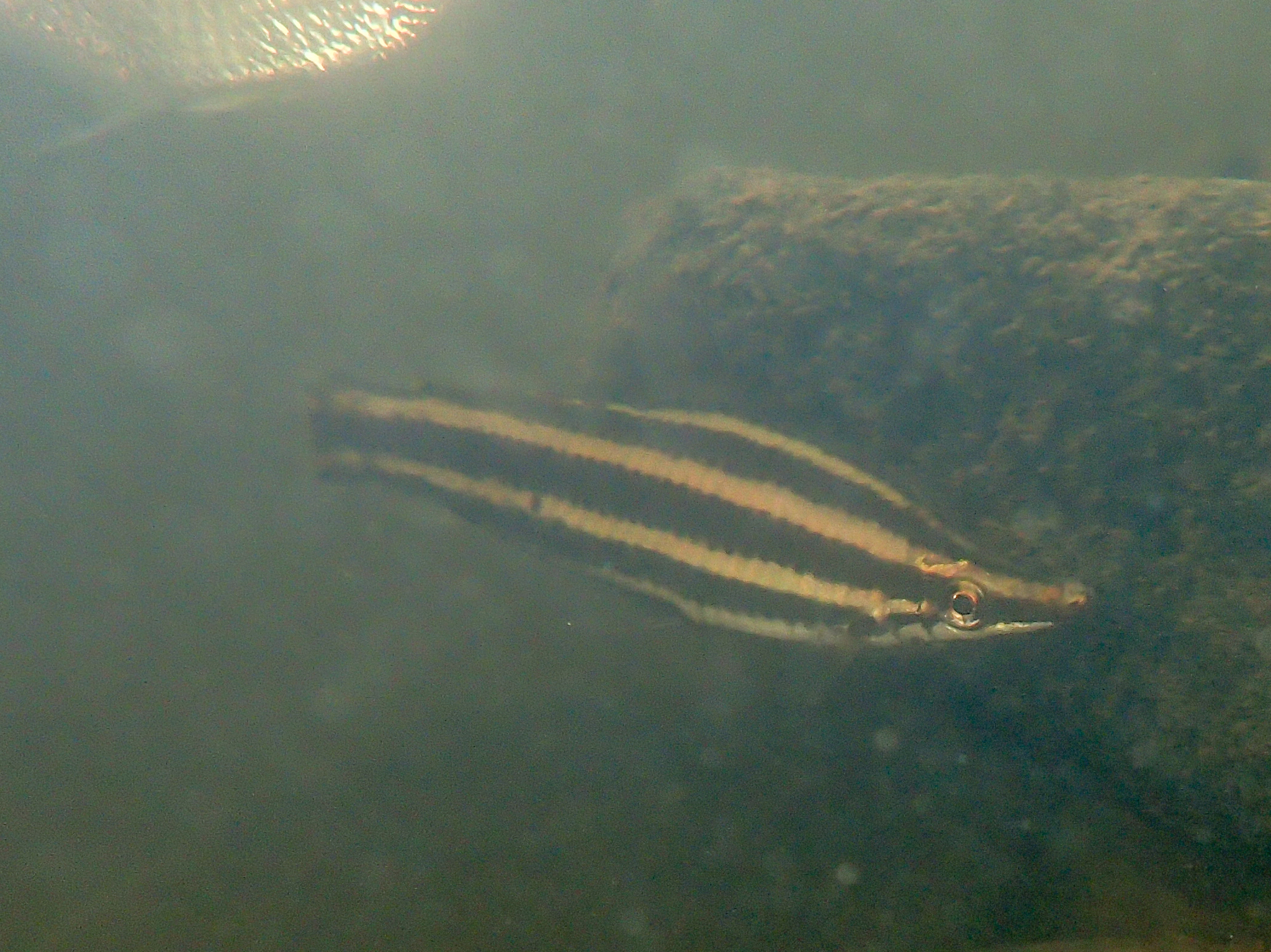

Conservation status
- Least Concern (IUCN 3.1)

Scientific classification
- Kingdom: Animalia
- Phylum: Chordata
- Class: Actinopterygii
- Order: Characiformes
- Family: Anostomidae
- Genus: Petulanos
- Species: P. brevior

Binomial name
- Petulanos brevior (Géry, 1961)

Synonyms
- Anostomus brevior Géry, 1961

= Petulanos brevior =

Species of fish

Petulanos brevior, the striped headstander, is a species of fish in the family Anostomidae. It occurs in South America and is present in the aquarium fish trade.

== Description ==
It can grow to 12 cm (4.7 in) standard length.

== Distribution and habitat ==
Petulanos brevior was first collected from Camopi, a tributary of the Oyapock River in French Guiana. It is now known to be widespread in French Guiana and present in Suriname. It is associated with rivers and creeks with strong currents and rocky to sandy substrates.
