= Sartor elongatus =

Conservation status
- Data Deficient (IUCN 3.1)

Scientific classification
- Kingdom: Animalia
- Phylum: Chordata
- Class: Actinopterygii
- Order: Characiformes
- Family: Anostomidae
- Genus: Sartor
- Species: S. elongatus

Binomial name
- Sartor elongatus dos Santos & Jégu, 1987

Species of fish

Sartor elongatus is a species of freshwater ray-finned fish belonging to the family Anostomidae, the toothed headstanders. This species is endemic to Brazil, where it is found in the Trombetas and Mapuera River basins. This species reaches a length of 7.6 cm (3.0 in).
