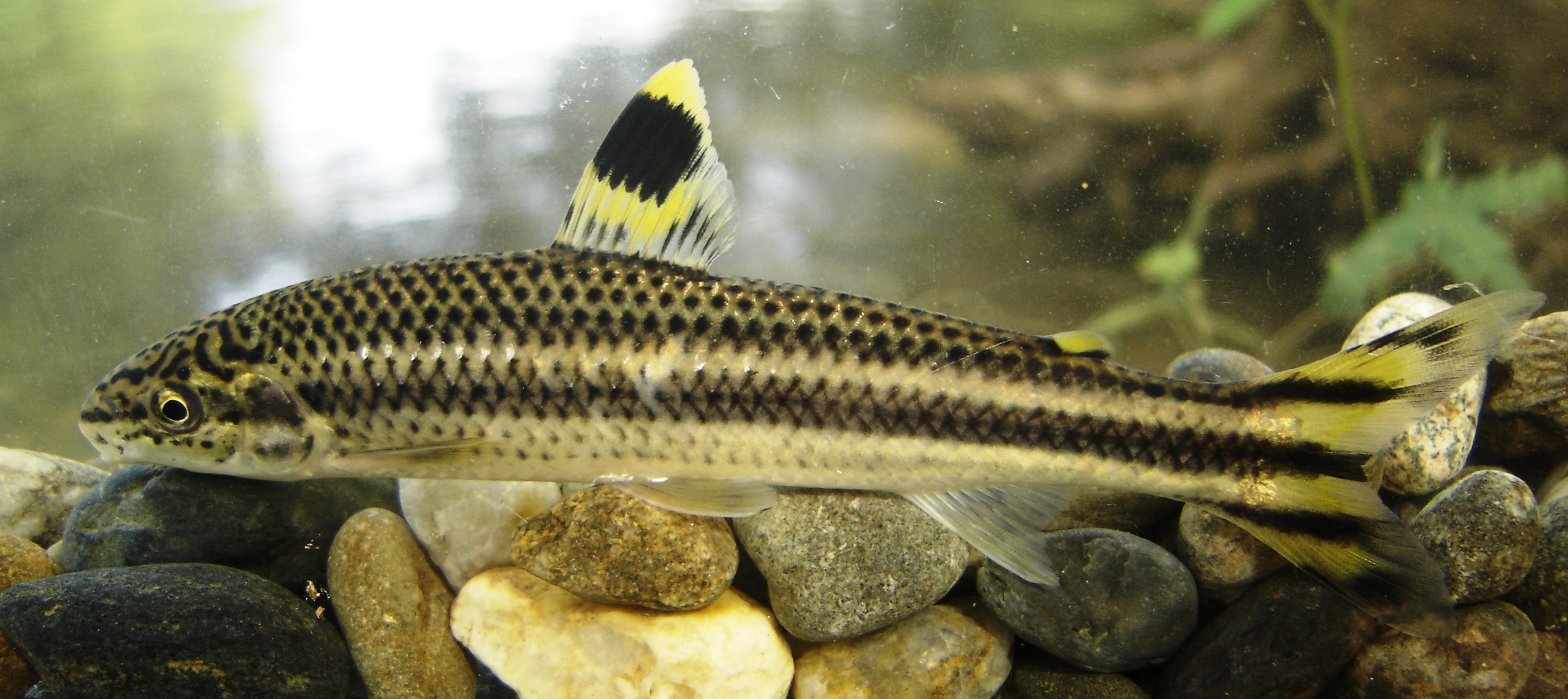
- Leporellus vittatus

Scientific classification
- Kingdom: Animalia
- Phylum: Chordata
- Class: Actinopterygii
- Order: Characiformes
- Family: Anostomidae
- Subfamily: Leporellinae; C. H. Eigenmann, 1912
- Genus: Leporellus; Lütken, 1875

Type species
- Leporinus pictus Kner, 1858

Synonyms
- Leporinodus C. H. Eigenmann, 1922

= Leporellus =

Genus of fishes

Leporellus is a genus of headstanders found in South America. They are mainly found in the São Francisco River and Paraná–Paraguay river basins, but L. vittatus also occurs in the Amazon. There are currently four described species in this genus.

The most basal member of the headstanders, they are the only member of the subfamily Leporellinae.

== Species ==
- Leporellus cartledgei Fowler, 1941
- Leporellus pictus (Kner, 1858)
- Leporellus retropinnis (C. H. Eigenmann, 1922)
- Leporellus vittatus (Valenciennes, 1850)
