= Johann Natterer =

Austrian naturalist and explorer (1787–1843)

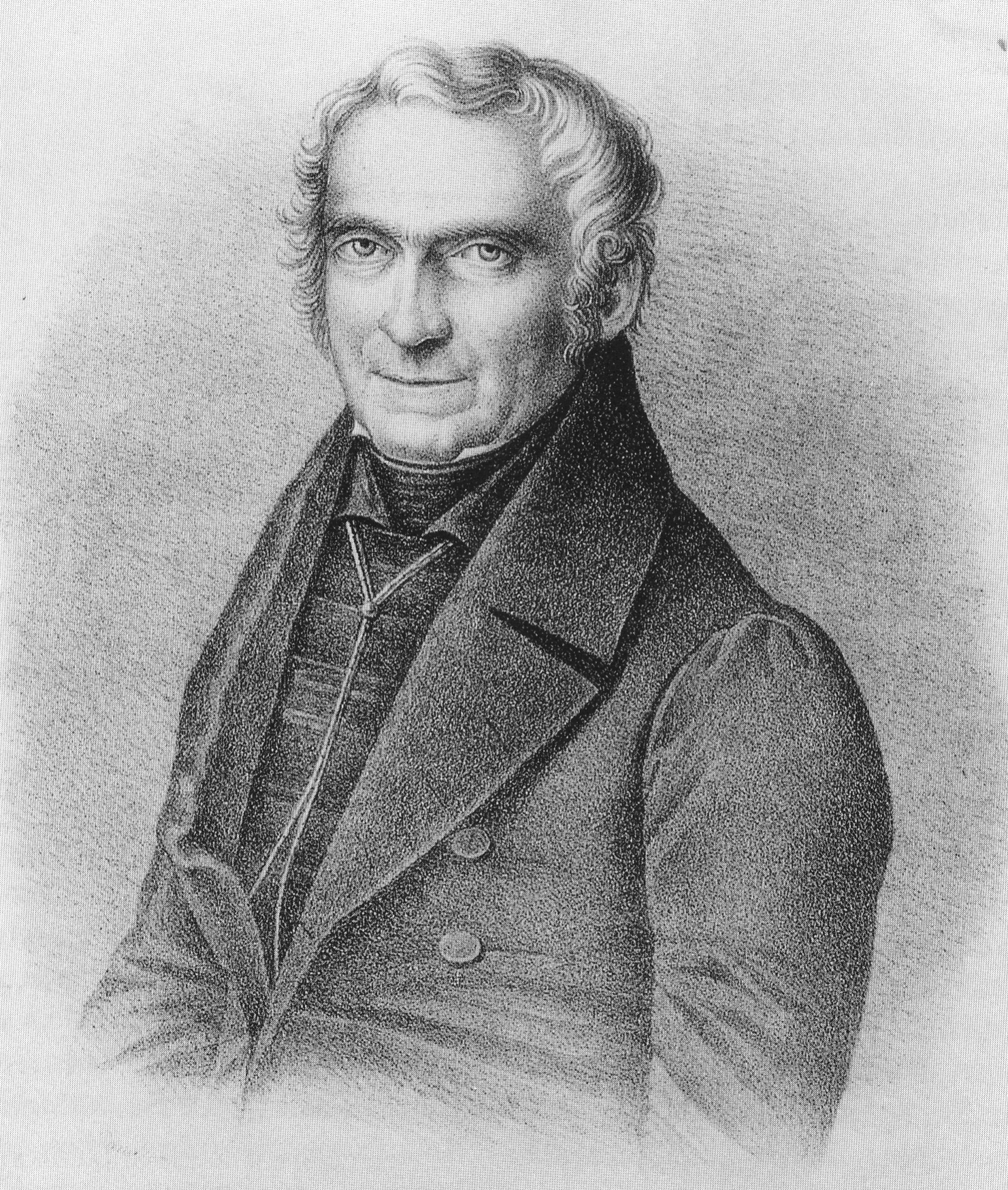
- Johann Natterer
- Born: November 9, 1787
- Died: June 17, 1843 (aged 55)
- Education: Attended material academy and university lectures
- Occupations: Naturalist, Explorer
- Known for: Extensive collection of specimens from South America, including new species
- Parent(s): Joseph Natterer Sr. (father), Maria Anna Theresia Schober (mother)
- Relatives: Joseph Natterer (brother)

Johann Natterer (9 November 1787 – 17 June 1843) was an Austrian naturalist and explorer. He was the son of royal falconer Joseph Natterer and along with his brother Joseph Natterer (1786–1852) took a keen interest in natural history. He collected natural history specimens extensively from South America and numerous species from his collections were named after him. Even though Natterer was seen as one of the most important actors for the imperial collection, modern research has been increasingly critical of his work. His success as a collector was largely based on the exploitation of slaves, the condoning of violence against the indigenous population, and the deliberate, and in some cases commissioned, acquisition of human remains.

== Family and early life ==
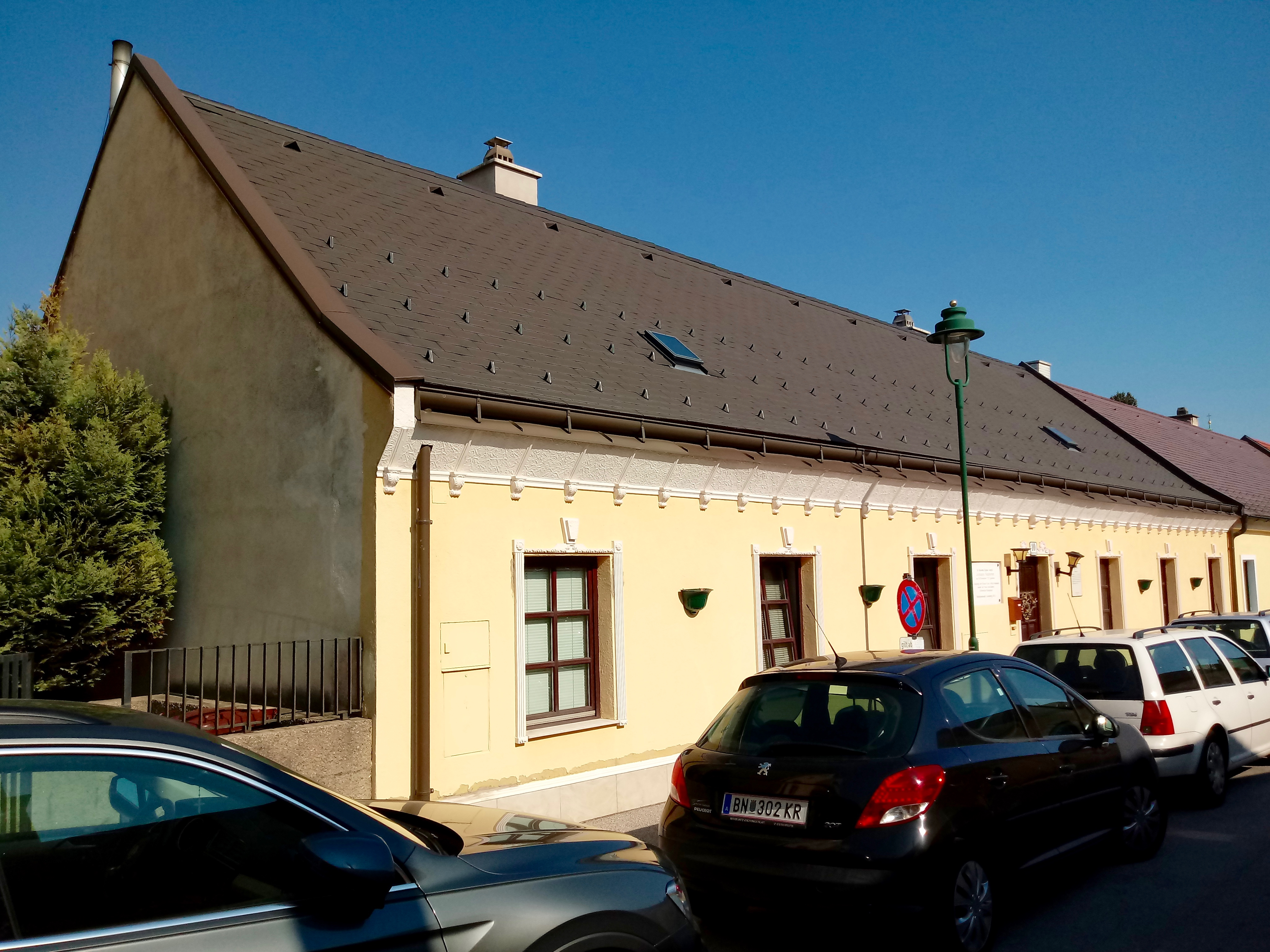
Natterer's birthplace in Laxenburg

Johann Natterer was born in Laxenberg, the son of the natural history specimen collector and falconer Joseph Natterer Sr. (1754–1823) and Maria Anna Theresia Schober (his mother), the daughter of a master baker from Laxenburg. He had a brother (Joseph Natterer, 1786–1852). Joseph Natterer Sr. was the last mounted falconer of Austria. When Emperor Franz I dissolved the falconry (Falknerei) in Laxenburg, he bought the collection of Joseph Natterer Sr. This contained numerous domestic birds, mammals, and insects, and Franz I assigned it the further support and the development of the collection.

The collection was brought in 1794 to Vienna and incorporated in the Tiercabinet with the k.k physical-astronomical as well as the Kunstcabinet. The collection was soon made accessible to the public, however without scientific or didactic value. Joseph Natterer Sr. introduced both his sons to the collection and taught them the art of preparing skins and mounts. The director of the collection was Karl von Schreibers and he was assisted by Joseph Natterer junior, who began his career as a volunteer aide and terminated as first curator (Kustos) of the collection, while Johann became, in 1808, a volunteer (freiwilliger) coworker.

Johann Natterer initially attended a Piarist school; however, in 1794, he transferred to a normal school and completed high school (gymnasium) there. From 1802 to 1803, Johann Natterer attended the material academy and heard scientific lectures at the university. He travelled through Europe collecting specimens and preparing them for the museum. He travelled to Turkey and Italy with the taxidermist Dominik Sochor from 1812 to 1814.

Natterer married Maria do Rego in Barcelos on the Rio Negro. According to his son-in-law Julius Schröckinger, Maria and two of their children died soon after arriving in Europe, which Schröckinger attributed to the unfamiliar climate. Their eldest daughter, Gertrude, survived and later married Schröckinger.

== Expeditions ==
The Austrian Brazil Expedition was not solely a scientific endeavour. It was heavily driven by the geopolitical and economic interests of the Habsburg monarchy. After the Napoleonic wars, the monarchy sought out new trade relations and the raw material markets that came with them. Furthermore, the official instructions for the expedition explicitly included gathering “ethnographic information” on the indigenous population and the directive to "procure a skull if possible". The analysis of the indigenous people of Brazil was directed as a colonial enterprise that was supposed to create a difference between the advanced West and the supposedly “wild indigenous population”.

In 1817, Emperor Franz I financed an expedition to Brazil on the occasion of the wedding of his daughter Archduchess Maria Leopoldina to the Portuguese crown prince, Dom Pedro of Alcantara (who was later to become Emperor of Brazil). Prince Klemens Wenzel von Metternich, a keen naturalist considered it an opportunity to send a team of naturalists and scientists. Natterer was initially considered for the expedition leader position but this was given to Johann Christian Mikan and he was selected as the zoologist on the expedition and was accompanied by other naturalists including Johann Baptist von Spix and Carl Friedrich Philipp von Martius. The team fell apart with several members falling sick. The Austrian government withdrew support in 1821 following unrest in Brazil. Johann Natterer and his friend Dominik Sochor remained in South America. He fell sick with hepatitis in 1825 and the next year Sochor died at São Vicente. He continued to collect specimens until 1835, returning to Vienna with a large collection of specimens, including new species such as the South American lungfish, which he gave to the Imperial Natural-Science Cabinet (K.k. Naturaliencabinet), the predecessor of the Naturhistorisches Museum.

To amass his enormous collection of over 50,000 objects, Natterer relied heavily on the exploitation of enslaved people. According to historians and anthropologists, Natterer, in contradiction to some of his colleagues like Alexander von Humboldt, fully embraced racist ideologies and never questioned the institution of slavery. He also advocated for the harsher treatment of enslaved people in his letters, describing it as a necessary education for them to become more compliant. In his own field notes from 1825, he justified strict punishments, claiming that granting slaves more freedom only led to worse outcomes. This included physical violence, like whippings. When Natterer finally returned to Vienna in 1836, he brought three enslaved individuals with him to Austria.

Natterer also profited from the ruthless colonial exploitation and murder of native populations. In 1828, it is documented in a letter that Natterer wrote to his local contact José Gomez da Silva and explicitly requested two human heads for his collection. They were expected casualties from an armed "punitive expedition" against the Cabixi people.

His son-in-law provides a list of Natterer's travels in Brazil:

1. 1817–1818 — Rio de Janeiro and surroundings.
2. 1818–1820 — Ilha Grande on the east coast and part of the province of São Paulo.
3. July 1820–February 1821 — Eastern São Paulo to Curitiba; returned via Paranaguá to Rio de Janeiro.
4. February 1821–September 1822 — From Ipanema through previously unvisited parts of São Paulo and Rio de Janeiro provinces.
5. October 1822–December 1824 — From São Paulo into Mato Grosso, reaching Cuiabá.
6. January 1825–1829 — From Cuiabá via Cáceres (Caissara) to Vila Bela da Santíssima Trindade (Villa Bella, Cidade de Mato Grosso), near the Bolivian border; extended stay due to illness and the death of his hunter Sochor.
7. July 1829–1830 — Down the Guaporé and Madeira rivers to Borba on the Madeira.
8. June 1830–early 1831 — Along the Amazon and Rio Negro to São José de Marabitanas; explored the Casiquiare region and the Xié, Içana, and Vaupés rivers; returned to Barcelos.
9. August 1831–1834 — Up the Rio Branco to Fort São Joaquim, near the border with British Guiana.
10. 1835–1836 — Intended journey through Pará and along the northeastern coast to Bahia and Rio de Janeiro was abandoned because of the Cabanagem revolt; left Pará for Europe on 15 September 1835 and returned to Vienna via London in 1836.

== Field notes ==
Natterer did not publish an account of his travels, and his notebooks and diary were destroyed in the Hofburg fire of 1848 during the Vienna Revolution; however, his specimen collections of 60,000 insects were a part of the "Brazilian museum" in the "Harrach' house" and escaped the fire.

Natterer also collected word lists of dozens of indigenous South American languages, including of various Arawakan, Tupian, Bororoan, and other languages. The lists are mostly still in unpublished manuscripts that are currently still being digitized.

== Postcolonial Criticism and Controversies ==
While traditionally Natterer has been regarded as "Prince of Collectors" by past historians, modern scientist become increasingly critical of his colonial racist identity, and historical reappraisals strongly deconstruct this uncritical admiration. Historian Christa Riedl-Dorn, who works for the Natural History Museum, noted in an interview that this identity and the erasure of slave work were systematically omitted from historical literature for a long time. She also reminded that the immense work of his female colleagues like Johanna Mikan was just mentioned in passing, while their work held significant importance. His wife Maria do Rego, whom he met during his expedition, was also a big support. After the naturalist married the Brazilian woman in the town of Barcelos in 1831, he was able to rely explicitly on her help as he continued to build up his vast natural history and ethnographic collections.

Natterer’s acquisition of human remains has been the subject of particularly fierce public and academic debate. The exhibition of a murdered individual's head in the Weltmuseum Wien, which was acquired by Natterer from the Munduruku people from the Rio Tapajós region around 1830, sparked huge controversy in 2017. Critics emphasized that, on one hand, the museum failed to address the colonial-racist violence perpetrated by Natterer and, on the other hand, that the exhibition of human remains didn’t belong in the 21st century.

== Specimens collected by Natterer ==
- Holoshesthes pequira (Steindachner 1882)

== Species named after Natterer ==
A number of animals are named after Johann Natterer, including

=== Birds ===
- Natterer's slaty antshrike (Thamnophilus stictocephalus) is a species of bird in subfamily Thamnophilinae of family Thamnophilidae, the "typical antbirds". It is found in Bolivia and Brazil.

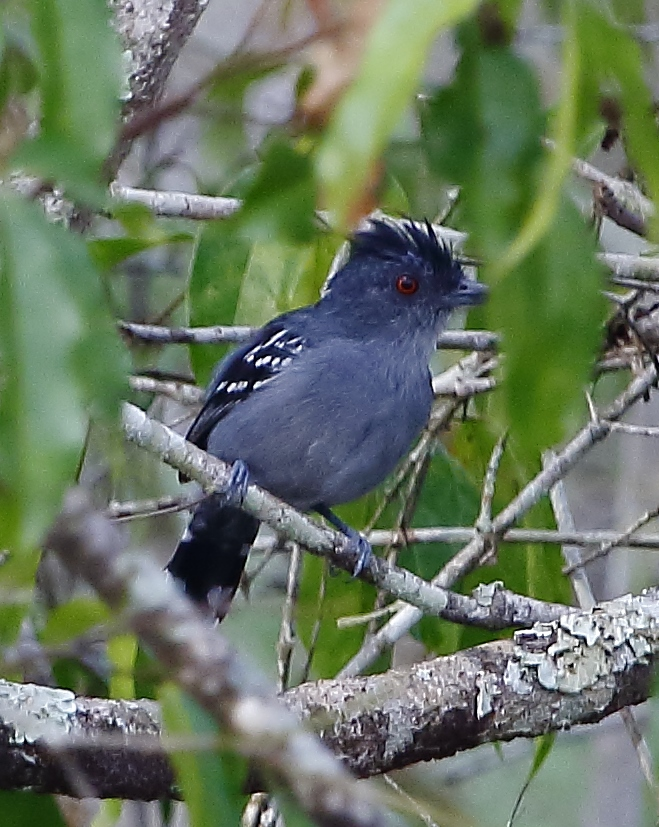
Natterer's slaty antshrike

- The tawny-tufted toucanet, Selenidera nattereri is a bird in the toucan family Ramphastidae. It is found in Brazil, Colombia, Venezuela, and possible Guyana.
- The Snow-capped Manakin Lepidothrix nattereri is a species of bird in the family Pipridae. It is found in the Amazon Basin of Brazil and far northeastern Bolivia. Its natural habitat is subtropical or tropical moist lowland forest.
- The Ochre-breasted Pipit, Anthus nattereri is a species of bird in the family Motacillidae. It is found in Argentina, Brazil, and Paraguay.
- The Cinnamon-throated Hermit Phaethornis nattereri is a species in the hummingbird family Trochilidae. It is found in Bolivia and Brazil.
- The Speckle-breasted Antpitta Cryptopezus nattereri is a species of bird in the family Grallariidae. It is found in Argentina, Brazil, and Paraguay.

=== Mammals ===
- Natterer's bat, Myotis nattereri (Kuhl, 1817) is a European vespertilionid bat with pale wings. It has brown fur tending to greyish-white on its underside. It is found across most of the continent of Europe, parts of the Near East and North Africa.

=== Reptiles ===
These species of reptiles are named in his honor:

- Xenodon nattereri, Natterer's hog nose snake, endemic to Brazil.
- Philodryas nattereri, the Paraguay green racer, is a species of venomous snake, endemic to South America. It is found in Paraguay and Brazil, where it inhabits open forests, fields and cerrado.
- Natterer's gecko, Tropiocolotes nattereri is a species of lizard in the family Gekkonidae. The species is native to northeastern Africa and Western Asia.
- The Cuyaba dwarf frog, Physalaemus nattereri is a frog native to central and southeastern Brazil and eastern Bolivia and Paraguay.
- Micrurus nattereri, Natterer’s coral snake or the Venezuelan aquatic coral snake, is a species of coral snake in the family Elapidae. Specimens have been identified mostly along the upper Orinoco River.
- Xenodon nattereri is a species of snake in the family Colubridae. It is found in Brazil, Argentina, and Uruguay.
- Dryophylax nattereri, the Amazon coastal house snake or northern coastal house snake, is a species of snake in the family Colubridae.

=== Insects ===
- Heliconius nattereri, Natterer's longwing is a species of butterfly in the family Nymphalidae. It is endemic to the Atlantic forest of Brazil.

=== Arachnids ===
- Actinopus nattereri is a species of mygalomorph spiders in the family Actinopodidae. It is found in Brazil.

=== Fish ===
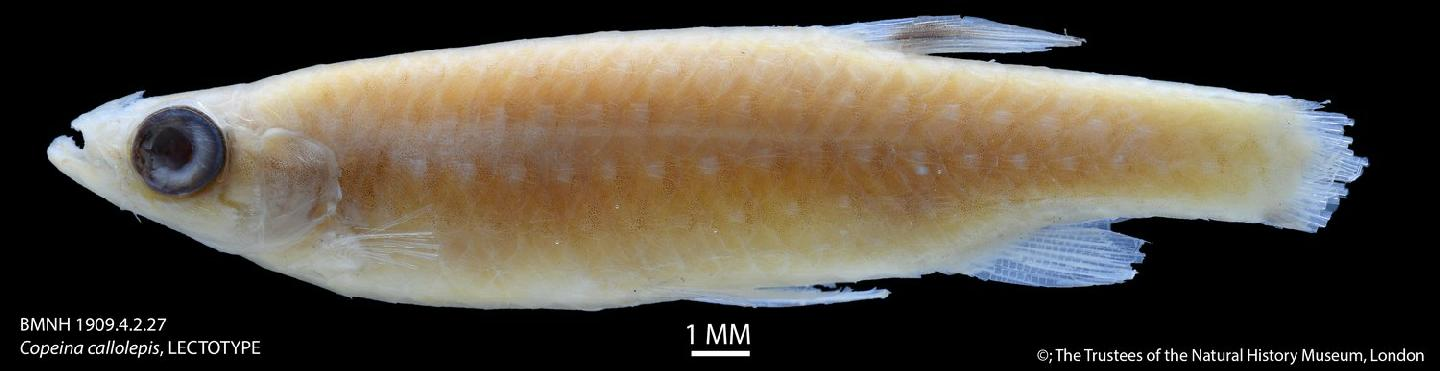
Copella nattereri

- The spotted tetra fish, Copella nattereri Steindachner, 1876 is a species of fish in the splashing tetra family found in the upper Amazon basin, as well as the Rio Negro and Orinoco basins.
- The Blue Corydoras or Natterer's Catfish Corydoras nattereri Steindachner, 1876 is a tropical freshwater fish belonging to the subfamily Corydoradinae of the family Callichthyidae. It originates in coastal rivers in South America, and is found in the Brazil from Espírito Santo to Paraná
- The South American fish Leporinus nattereri Steindachner 1876.
- The red-bellied piranha, also known as the red piranha Pygocentrus nattereri Kner 1858, is a type of piranha native to South America, found in the Amazon, Paraguay, Paraná and Essequibo basins, as well as coastal rivers of northeastern Brazil. This fish is locally abundant in its freshwater habitat.
- The Dawn Tetra, Panda Tetra, or Rio Paraguay Tetra, Aphyocharax nattereri (Steindachner 1882) comes from the Rio Paraguay basin in Paraguay and Brazil.
- Brycon nattereri Günther 1864
- Hoplisoma nattereri (Steindachner 1876)
- Farlowella nattereri Steindachner 1910 is a species of armored catfish of the family native to Bolivia, Brazil, Colombia, Ecuador, Guyana and Peru. It occurs in the upper Essequibo and Amazon basins.
- Trachydoras nattereri (Steindachner 1881) is a species of thorny catfish native to the Amazon basin of Brazil, Colombia and Peru.
- The Ghost Knifefish, Sternarchogiton nattereri (Steindachner 1868)
- Apionichthys nattereri is a species of sole in the family Achiridae.
- Insperanos nattereri (Steindachner, 1876) is a species of anostomid fish. It is found in the Rio Negro, Aleixo Lake, and the central Amazon basin in Brazil.
