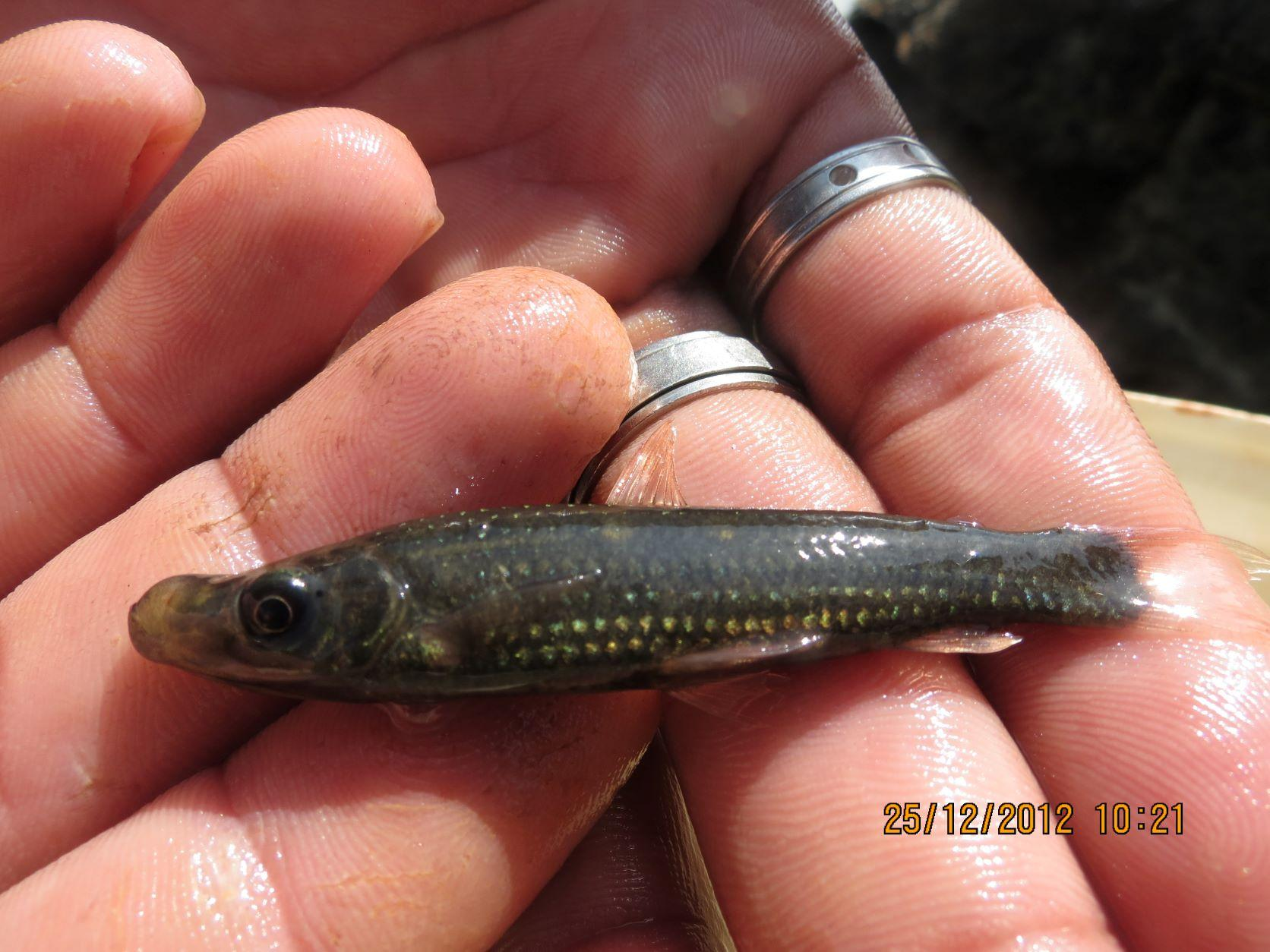

Conservation status
- Least Concern (IUCN 3.1)

Scientific classification
- Kingdom: Animalia
- Phylum: Chordata
- Class: Actinopterygii
- Division: Teleostei
- Order: Characiformes
- Family: Anostomidae
- Genus: Sartor
- Species: S. respectus

Binomial name
- Sartor respectus G. S. Myers & A. L. de Carvalho, 1959

= Sartor respectus =

Species of fish

Sartor respectus is a species of freshwater ray-finned fish belonging to the family Anostomidae, the toothed headstanders. This fish is endemic to Brazil, where it is found in the upper Xingu River basin, Brazil.
