= Anostomus longus =

Conservation status
- Least Concern (IUCN 3.1)

Scientific classification
- Kingdom: Animalia
- Phylum: Chordata
- Class: Actinopterygii
- Order: Characiformes
- Family: Anostomidae
- Genus: Anostomus
- Species: A. longus

Binomial name
- Anostomus longus Géry, 1961

Species of fish

Anostomus longus is small species of freshwater ray-finned fish belonging to the family Anostomidae, the toothed headstanders. It is only known from the upper Amazon of Peru. It has been collected in a slow moving river.
