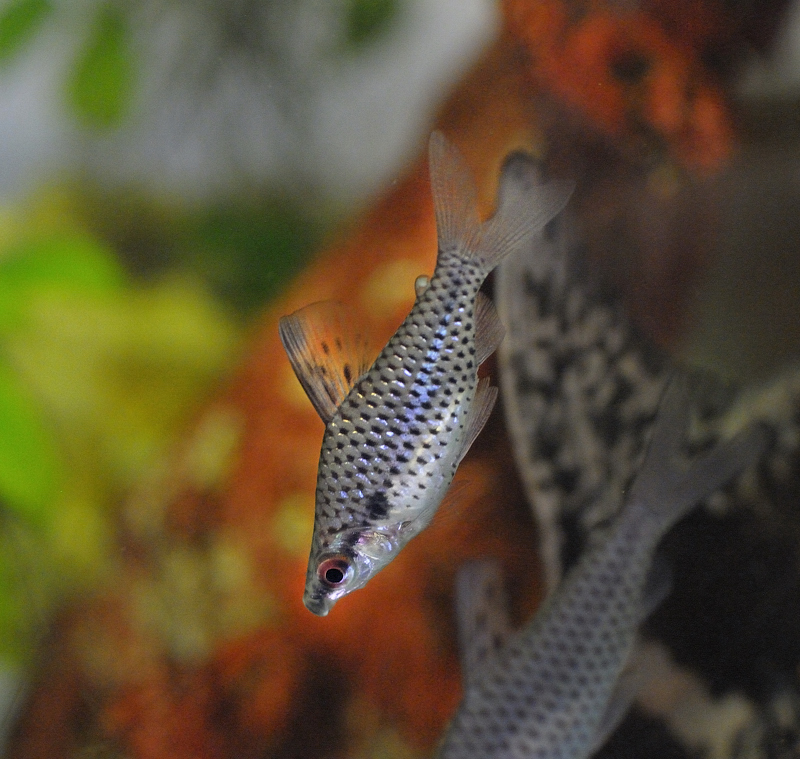

Conservation status
- Least Concern (IUCN 3.1)

Scientific classification
- Kingdom: Animalia
- Phylum: Chordata
- Class: Actinopterygii
- Order: Characiformes
- Family: Chilodidae
- Genus: Chilodus
- Species: C. punctatus

Binomial name
- Chilodus punctatus J. P. Müller & Troschel, 1844

Synonyms
- Citherinus chilodus Valenciennes, 1850

= Chilodus punctatus =

Species of fish

Chilodus punctatus, known as the spotted headstander or pearl headstander, is a species of freshwater ray-finned fish belonging to the family Chilodidae, the headstanders. The spotted headstander has a body that extends grayish and green colors over its body and sets off the colors with rows of brown specks.

This fish is given the name due to its distinctive head-down swimming position (at 45°). These fish usually remain in the shade, emerging to feed.

== Distribution ==
Chilodus punctatus is widespread in northeastern South America and in the Loreto region in Peru. It grows up to 7 cm (2.8 in). It is a typical representative of the Curimatidae, which are among the barbary tetra. The body is moderately elongated, the back slightly raised. The mouth is small, slightly upward, with a thick upper lip. The fish is a headstand, delicate gray to brown, the throat and belly are silver-colored. From the mouth tip over the eye to the middle of the base of the caudal fin an extending black longitudinal band.
