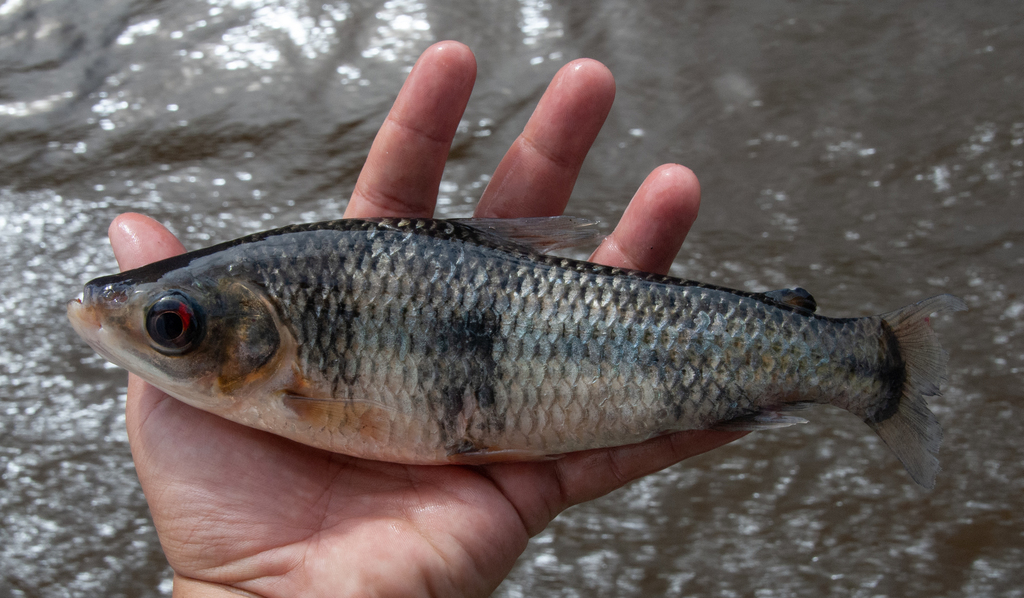
- Anostomoides atrianalis

Scientific classification
- Kingdom: Animalia
- Phylum: Chordata
- Class: Actinopterygii
- Order: Characiformes
- Family: Anostomidae
- Subfamily: Leporininae
- Genus: Anostomoides; Pellegrin, 1909

Type species
- Anostomoides atrianalis Pellegrin, 1909

= Anostomoides =

Genus of fishes

Anostomoides is a monospecific genus of freshwater ray-finned fishes belonging to the family Anostomidae, the toothed headstanders. These fishes are found in South America.

== Species ==
Anostomoides contains the sole valid species Anostomoides atrianalis, described along with the genus by Jacques Pellegrin in 1909.
