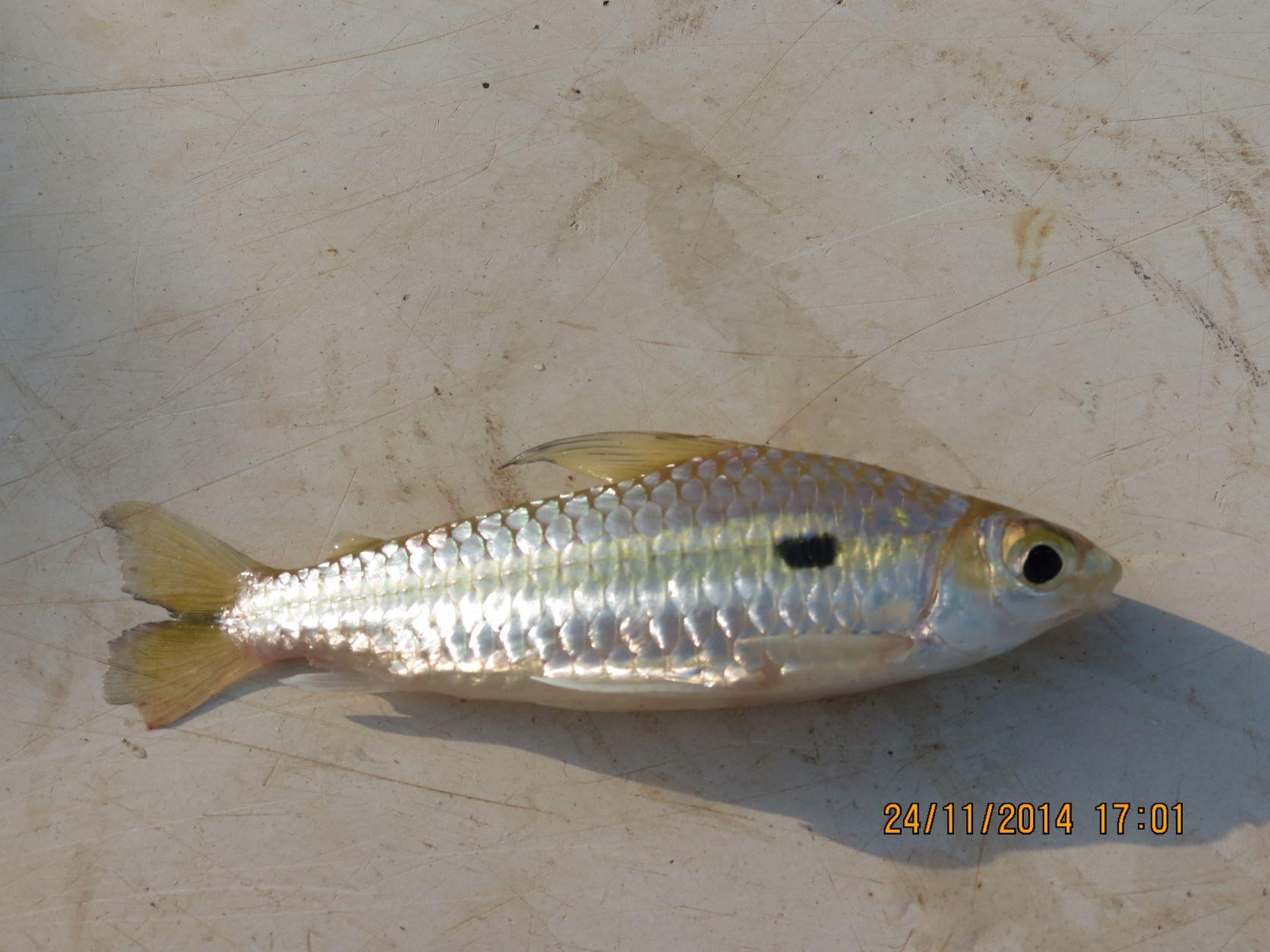
- Caenotropus labyrinthicus

Scientific classification
- Kingdom: Animalia
- Phylum: Chordata
- Class: Actinopterygii
- Order: Characiformes
- Family: Chilodidae
- Genus: Caenotropus; Günther, 1864

Type species
- Microdus labyrinthicus Kner, 1858

Synonyms
- Microdus Kner, 1858; Tylobronchus C. H. Eigenmann, 1912

= Caenotropus =

Genus of fishes

Caenotropus is a genus of freshwater ray-finned fishes belonging to the family Chilodidae, the headstanders. The fishes in this genus are found in from South America, where they occur in the Orinoco, Parnaíba, and Amazon Basins, as well as various rivers in the Guianas.

== Species ==
The currently described species in this genus are:

- Caenotropus labyrinthicus (Kner, 1858)
- Caenotropus maculosus (C. H. Eigenmann, 1912)
- Caenotropus mestomorgmatos Vari, R. M. C. Castro & Raredon, 1995
- Caenotropus schizodon Scharcansky & C. A. S. de Lucena, 2007
