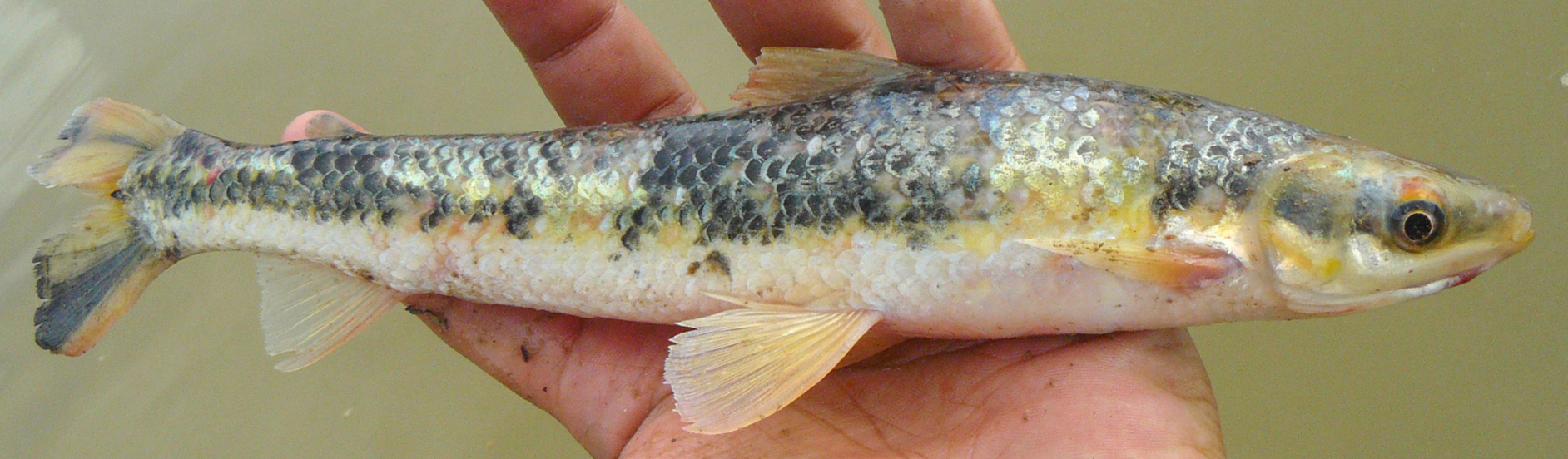
- Rhytiodus argenteofuscus

Scientific classification
- Kingdom: Animalia
- Phylum: Chordata
- Class: Actinopterygii
- Order: Characiformes
- Family: Anostomidae
- Subfamily: Leporininae
- Genus: Rhytiodus; Kner, 1858

Type species
- Rhytiodus microlepis Kner, 1858

Synonyms
- Garmania Fowler, 1906

= Rhytiodus =

Genus of fishes

Rhytiodus is a genus of freshwater ray-finned fish belonging to the family Anostomidae, the toothed headstanders. The fishes in this genus are found in the basin of the Amazon River in South America.

== Species ==
Rhytiodus contains the following species:

- Rhytiodus argenteofuscus Kner, 1858
- Rhytiodus elongatus (Steindachner, 1908)
- Rhytiodus lauzannei Géry, 1987
- Rhytiodus microlepis Kner, 1858
