= Pseudanos =

Scientific classification
- Kingdom: Animalia
- Phylum: Chordata
- Class: Actinopterygii
- Order: Characiformes
- Family: Anostomidae
- Subfamily: Anostominae
- Genus: Pseudanos; R. Winterbottom, 1980

Type species
- Schizodon trimaculatus Kner, 1858

Genus of fishes

Pseudanos is a genus of freshwater ray-finned fishes belonging to the family Anostomidae, the toothed headstander. The fishes in this genus are from South America, in the Orinoco and Amazon Basins.

== Species ==
Pseudanos contains the following species:

- Pseudanos gracilis (Kner, 1858)
- Pseudanos trimaculatus (Kner, 1858) (Threespot headstander)
- Pseudanos varii Birindelli, F. C. T. Lima & Britski, 2012
- Pseudanos winterbottomi Sidlauskas & dos Santos, 2005
