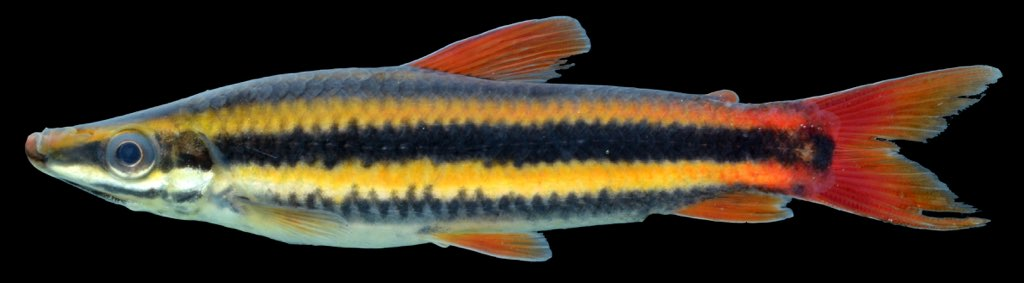
- Anostomus anostomus, (striped headstander)

Scientific classification
- Kingdom: Animalia
- Phylum: Chordata
- Class: Actinopterygii
- Order: Characiformes
- Family: Anostomidae
- Subfamily: Anostominae
- Genus: Anostomus; Scopoli, 1777

Type species
- Salmo anostomus Linnaeus, 1758

Species
- See text

Synonyms
- Anostomus Cuvier, 1816; Mormyrynchus Swainson, 1839; Histiodromus Gistel, 1848; Pithecocharax Fowler, 1906

= Anostomus =

Genus of fishes

Anostomus is a small genus of freshwater ray-finned fishes in the family Anostomidae, the toothed headstanders. This species in this genus are found in South America. They occur in the Orinoco and Amazon Basin, as well as various rivers in the Guianas. Petulanos was until recently included here.

== Species ==
Anostomus contains the following species:

- Anostomus anostomus (Linnaeus, 1758) (striped anostomus, striped headstander)
- Anostomus longus Géry, 1961
- Anostomus ternetzi Fernández-Yépez, 1949
