= Gnathodolus =

Conservation status
- Data Deficient (IUCN 3.1)

Scientific classification
- Kingdom: Animalia
- Phylum: Chordata
- Class: Actinopterygii
- Division: Teleostei
- Order: Characiformes
- Family: Anostomidae
- Subfamily: Anostominae
- Genus: Gnathodolus; Myers, 1927
- Species: G. bidens

Binomial name
- Gnathodolus bidens Myers, 1927

Species of fish

Gnathodolus is a monospecific genus of freshwater ray-finned fish belonging to the family Anostomidae, the toothed headstanders. The only species on the genus is Gnathodolus bidens, a species which is endemic to the Orinoco and Casiquiare rivers in Venezuela.

== Environment ==
Gnathodolus bidens is known to be found in a freshwater environment within a benthopelagic depth range. This species is native to a tropical climate.

== Distribution ==
Gnathodolus bidens can be found in South America, Orinoco, Casiquiare rivers, and Venezuela.

== Biology ==
Gnathodolus bidens has the ability to breed once the pair is in a heavily dense and weeded area. This species serves as no threat to humans and they are considered to be harmless.

== Classification ==
The taxonomic classification of Gnathodolus bidens is as follows:

- Kingdom : Animalia
- Phylum : Chordata
- Subphylum : Vertebrata
- Superclass : Osteichthyes
- Class : Actinopterygii
- Subclass : Neopterygii
- Infraclass : Teleostei
- Superorder : Ostariophysi
- Order : Characiformes
- Family : Anostomidae
- Subfamily : Anostominae
- Genus : Gnathodolus
- Species : Gnathodolus bidens

== Notes ==
- Froese, Rainer; Pauly, Daniel (eds.). "Gnathodolus bidens". FishBase. October 2011 version.
