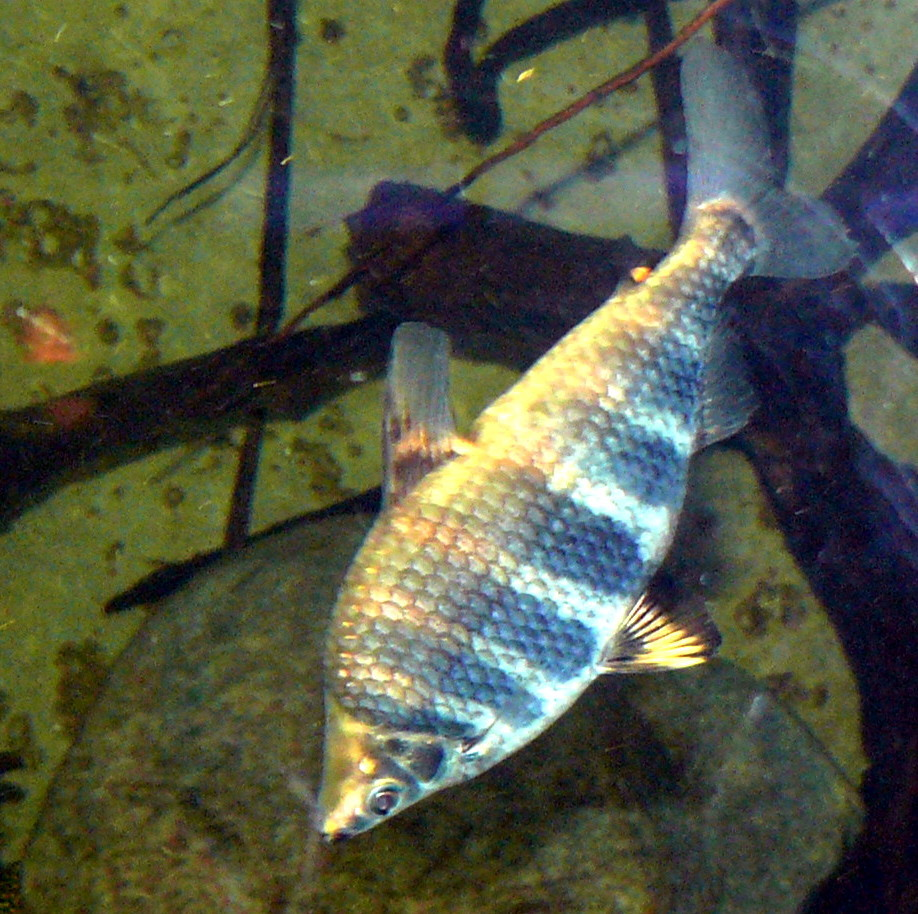
- Abramites hypselonotus

Scientific classification
- Kingdom: Animalia
- Phylum: Chordata
- Class: Actinopterygii
- Order: Characiformes
- Family: Anostomidae
- Subfamily: Leporininae
- Genus: Abramites; Fowler, 1906

Type species
- Leporinus hypselonotus Günther, 1868

= Abramites =

Genus of fishes

Abramites is a genus of freshwater ray-finned fishes belonging to the family Anostomidae, the toothed headstanders. These fishes are found in South America.

== Species ==
Species	Common name	Adult size	Image
Abramites eques (Steindachner, 1878)		15 cm (5.9 in)	
Abramites hypselonotus (Günther, 1868)	Marbled headstander	14 cm (5.5 in)	
