= Anostomus ternetzi =

Conservation status
- Least Concern (IUCN 3.1)

Scientific classification
- Kingdom: Animalia
- Phylum: Chordata
- Class: Actinopterygii
- Order: Characiformes
- Family: Anostomidae
- Genus: Anostomus
- Species: A. ternetzi

Binomial name
- Anostomus ternetzi Fernández-Yépez, 1949

Species of fish

Anostomus ternetzi, the red mouth headstander, is a species of freshwater ray-finned fish belonging to the family Anostomidae, the toothed headstanders.

== Etymology ==
The fish is named in honor of ichthyologist and naturalist Carl Ternetz (1870–1928), who collected the type specimen.

== Description ==
It can grow to 12 cm (4.7 in) total length.

== Distribution and habitat ==
Anostomus ternetzi is widespread in South America: it is found in the Orinoco, Araguaia and Amazon River basins (Brazil, Colombia, and Venezuela) as well as in coastal rivers of Guianas. It occurs in both black and clear water rivers.
