= Laemolyta =

Scientific classification
- Kingdom: Animalia
- Phylum: Chordata
- Class: Actinopterygii
- Order: Characiformes
- Family: Anostomidae
- Subfamily: Leporininae
- Genus: Laemolyta; Cope, 1872

Type species
- Schizodon taeniatus Kner, 1858

Synonyms
- Schizodontopsis Garman, 1890

Genus of fishes

Laemolyta is a genus of freshwater ray-finned fish belonging to the family Anostomidae, the toothed headstanders. The fishes in this genus are found in the Orinoco and Amazon Basins in South America.

== Species ==
These are the currently recognized species in this genus:

- Laemolyta fernandezi Myers, 1950
- Laemolyta garmani (Borodin, 1931)
- Laemolyta orinocensis (Steindachner, 1879)
- Laemolyta proxima (Garman, 1890)
- Laemolyta taeniata (Kner, 1858)
