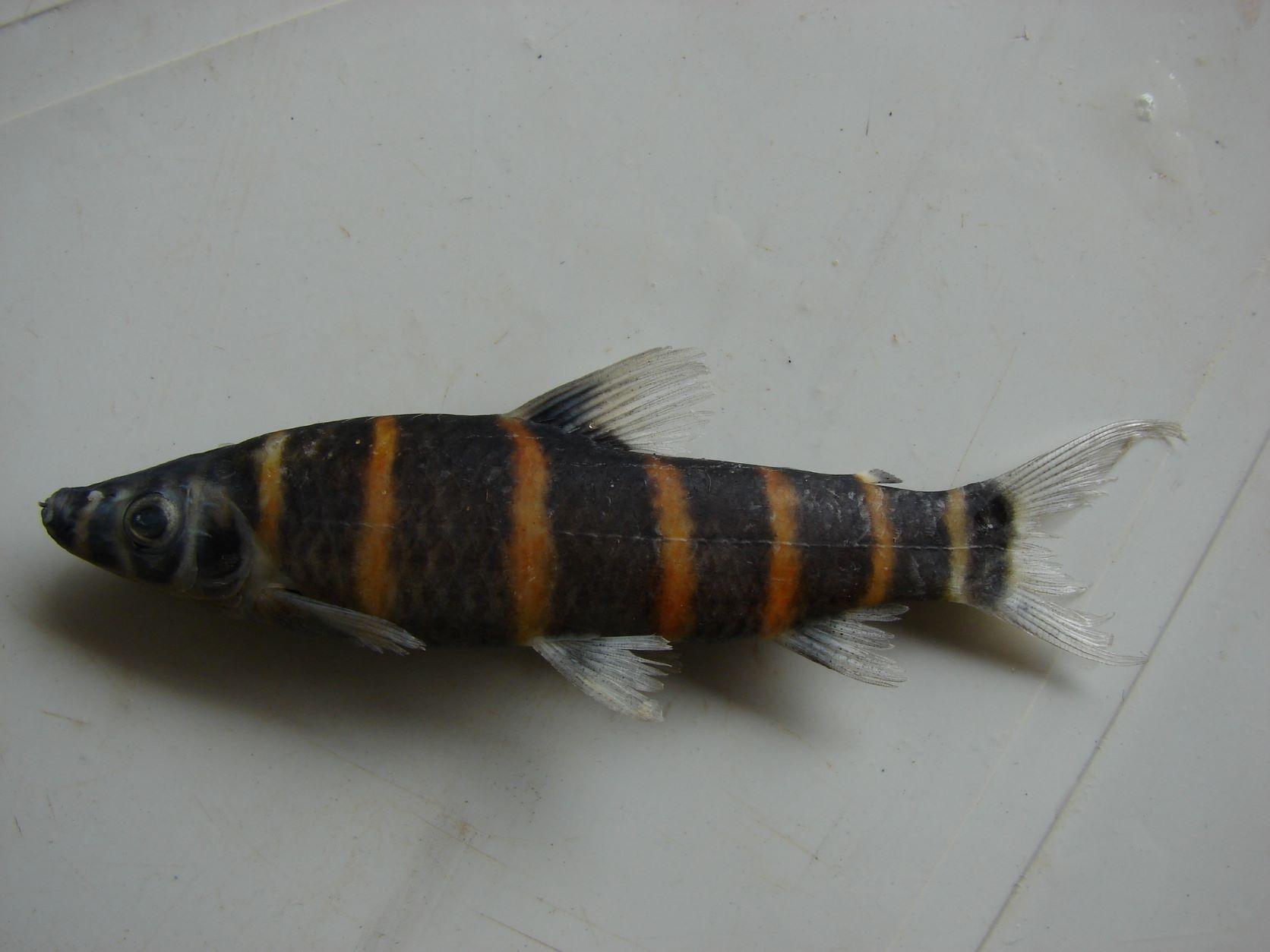

Conservation status
- Least Concern (IUCN 3.1)

Scientific classification
- Kingdom: Animalia
- Phylum: Chordata
- Class: Actinopterygii
- Order: Characiformes
- Family: Anostomidae
- Genus: Synaptolaemus; Myers & Fernández-Yépez, 1950
- Species: S. latofasciatus

Binomial name
- Synaptolaemus latofasciatus (Steindachner, 1910)

Synonyms
- Leporinus latofasciatus Steindachner, 1910; Synaptolaemus cingulatus Myers & Fernández-Yépez, 1950

= Synaptolaemus =

Genus of fishes

Synaptolaemus is a monospecific genus of freshwater ray-finned fish belonging to the family Anostomidae, the toothed headstanders. The only species in the genus is Synaptolaemus latofasciatus, a species found in South America.

== Taxonomy ==
Synaptolaemus was first proposed as a monospecific genus in 1950 by George S. Myers and Augustín Fernández-Yépez when they described Synaptolaemus cingulatus as a new species, designating it as the type species. The type locality of S. cingulatus was given as Laja Supira on the upper Orinoco River in Venezuela. In 2011 Leporinus latofasciatus, a species described by Franz Steindachner in 1910, also from the Orinoco, was reclassified as Synaptolaemus latofasciatus. S. cingulatus is now considered to be a synonym of S. latofasciatus and this genus is once again thought to be monospecific. This genus is classified in the subfamily Anostominae of the family Anostomidae, the headstanders, in the suborder Characoidei of the order Characiformes.

== Etymology ==
Synaptolaemus is a combination of the Greek words synaptós, which means "joined together" or "united", with laimós, meaning "throat", an allusion to the wide merging of the gill membranes with the throat. The specific name is a combination of the Latin latus, meaning "wide", with fasciatus, which means "banded", and reference to the yellow and black banded pattern of this fish.

== Description ==
Synaptolaemus is distinguished from other toothed headstanders by having teeth at the symphysis of the lower jaw which are roughly twice as long as they are wide and in the gill membranes having a broad union with the throat. The lower jaw has a width of half its length and is almost vertical when the mouth is closed. The colour pattern consists of vertical bands of orange or yellow alternating with dark brown or black bands which extend below the lateral line and run along the whole body. This species has a maximum standard length of 9.4 cm (3.7 in).

== Distribution and habitat ==
Synaptolaemus is found in the Orinoco and Amazon basins of Brazil, Colombia and Venezuela. Its occurrence in Guyana or Suriname has yet to be confirmed. It is found in rapids with rocky bottoms in both black and clear waters.
