= Sartor =

Scientific classification
- Kingdom: Animalia
- Phylum: Chordata
- Class: Actinopterygii
- Order: Characiformes
- Family: Anostomidae
- Subfamily: Anostominae
- Genus: Sartor; G. S. Myers & A. L. de Carvalho, 1959

Type species
- Sartor respectus G. S. Myers & A. L. de Carvalho, 1959

Genus of fishes

Sartor is a genus of freshwater ray-finned fishes belonging to the family Anostomidae, the toothed headstanders. These fishes are endemic to Brazil. The genus is found in the eastern Amazon Basin, specifically in the Xingu, Tocantins, Mapuera and Trombetas basins.

== Species ==
There are currently three recognized species in this genus:

- Sartor elongatus dos Santos & Jégu, 1987
- Sartor respectus G. S. Myers & A. L. de Carvalho, 1959
- Sartor tucuruiense dos Santos & Jégu, 1987
