= Insperanos =

Conservation status
- Least Concern (IUCN 3.1)

Scientific classification
- Kingdom: Animalia
- Phylum: Chordata
- Class: Actinopterygii
- Order: Characiformes
- Family: Anostomidae
- Subfamily: Leporininae
- Genus: Insperanos; Assega, Sidlauskas & Birindelli, 2021
- Species: I. nattereri

Binomial name
- Insperanos nattereri (Steindachner, 1876)

Synonyms
- Leporinus nattereri Steindachner, 1976; Anostomoides nattereri (Steindachner, 1976); Anostomoides passionis Santos & Zuanon, 2006

Species of fish

Insperanos is a monospecific genus of freshwater ray-finned fish belonging to the family Anostomidae, the toothed headstanders. The only species in this genus is Insperanos nattereri, which is found in the Rio Negro, Aleixo Lake, and the central Amazon basin in Brazil. It is the only member of the genus Insperanos. Prior to 2021, it was classified in the large genus Leporinus, but was moved to its own monotypic genus in 2021 after a phylogenetic analysis found it to represent an evolutionarily basal member of the subfamily. It is thought to be a relatively ancient genus, having diverged from the rest of the Leporininae during the Late Eocene, about 37 million years ago.

== Etymology ==
It is named in honor of Johann Natterer (1787-1843).
