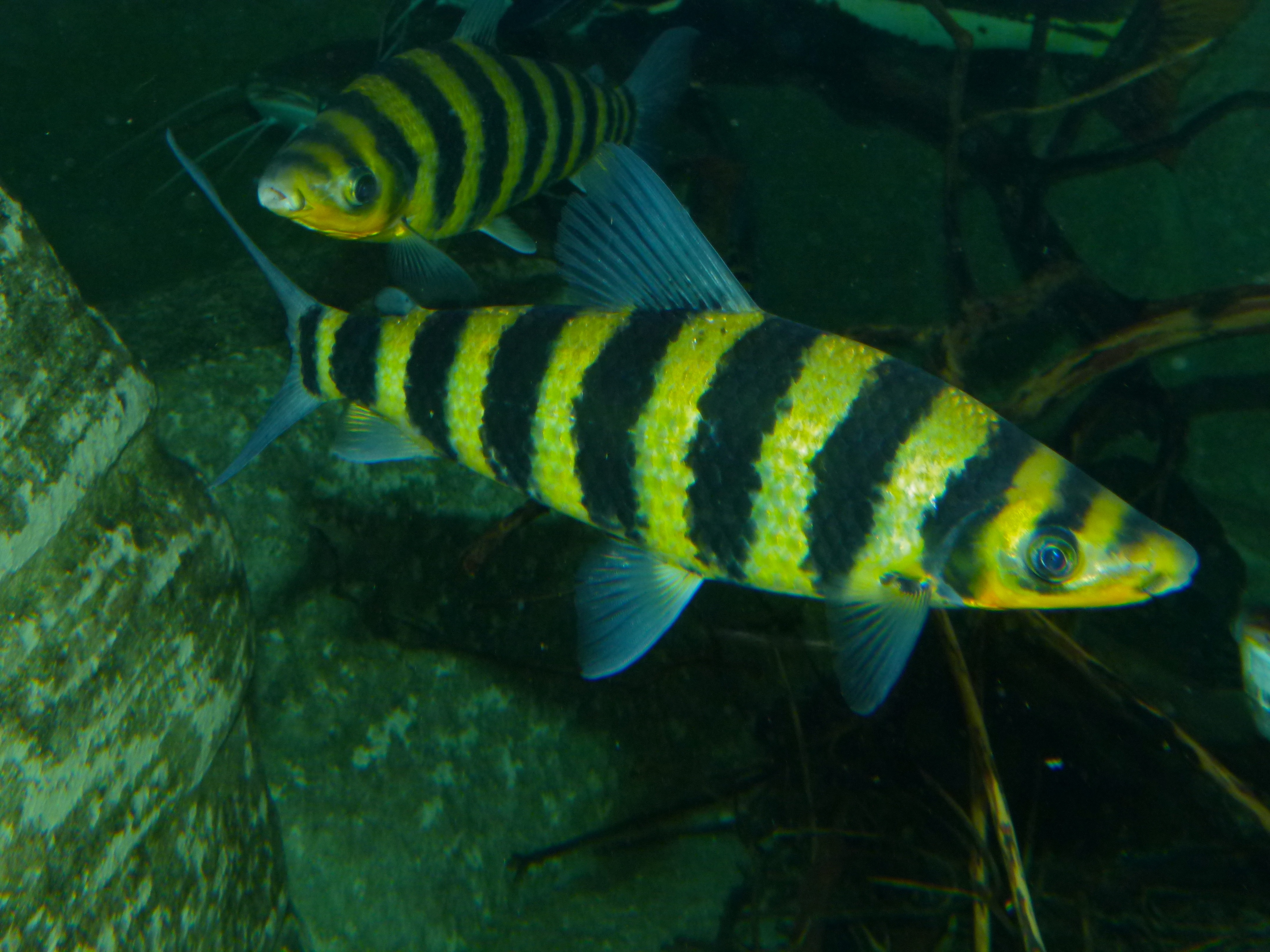
- L. fasciatus in an aquarium
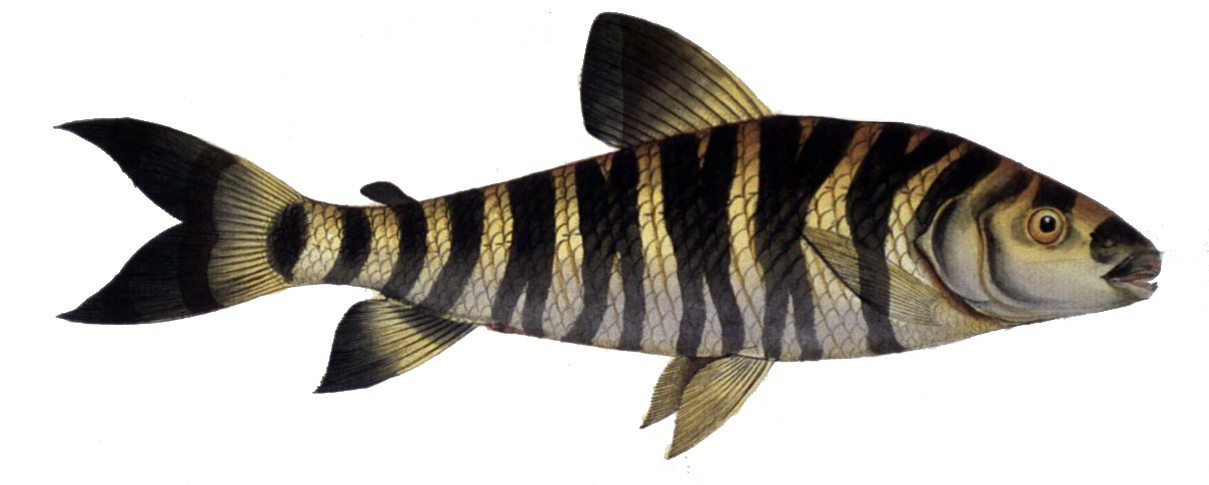
- Illustration of L. fasciatus in Bloch et al.

Conservation status
- Least Concern (IUCN 3.1)

Scientific classification
- Kingdom: Animalia
- Phylum: Chordata
- Class: Actinopterygii
- Division: Teleostei
- Order: Characiformes
- Family: Anostomidae
- Genus: Leporinus
- Species: L. fasciatus

Binomial name
- Leporinus fasciatus (Bloch, 1794)

Synonyms
- Salmo fasciatus Bloch, 1794; Leporinus novemfasciatus Spix & Agassiz, 1829; Leporinus holostictus Cope, 1878

= Leporinus fasciatus =

Species of fish

Leporinus fasciatus, commonly known as the banded leporinus or the black-banded leporinus, is a species of freshwater ray-finned fish belonging to the family Anostomidae, the toothed headstanders. L. fasciatus is native to the Amazon Basin in South America, but has been introduced into the US states of Florida and Hawaii. It has not been observed from Hawaii as of 2005; the species is thought to have been extirpated in the region.

== Description ==
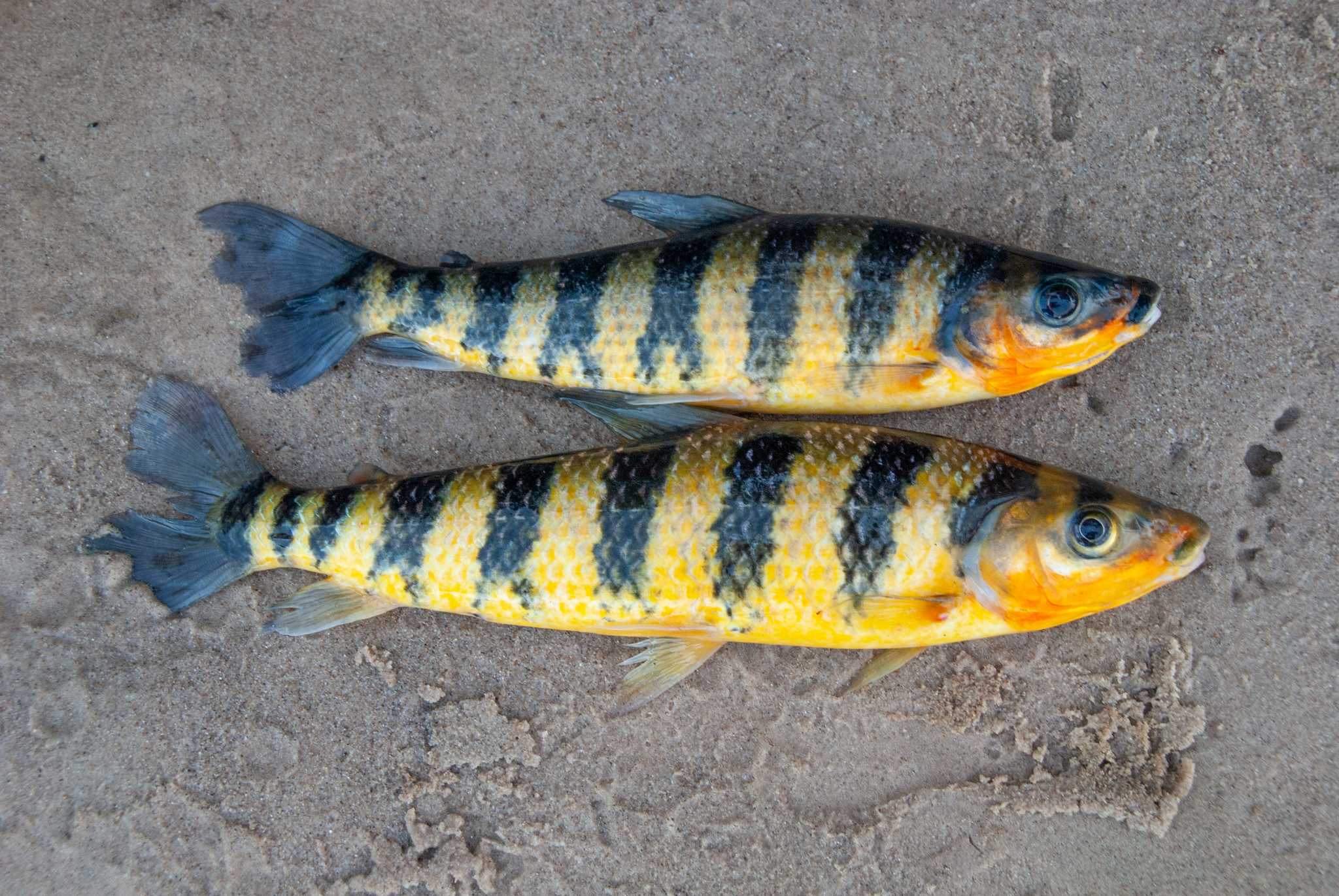
In Brazil

Leporinus fasciatus has been recorded to reach 30 centimetres (12 in) in length, although individuals reach maturity around 15 centimetres (5.9 in).

L. fasciatus is yellow with black stripes, giving it a bee-like appearance. It frequently also exhibiting orange markings on the head and tail fin. There is some variation in colouration, with a bright yellow or beige body and transparent fins. There are eight to twelve vertical bands on the body. Females may be distinguished from males in that adult females are larger.

== Diet ==
L. fasciatus is omnivorous: its diet comprises vegetative matter as well as other fish, worms, and crustaceans.

== Distribution ==
Leporinus fasciatus is tropical freshwater species, native to the rivers and flooded forests of South America. Its range encompasses the Amazon Basin. It is generally found in fast-flowing waters.

L. fasciatus has also been recorded in the US states of Florida and Hawaii, probably introduced accidentally as a result of aquarium releases. However, it has not been reported from Hawaii for several years; therefore the Hawaii population is thought to have been extirpated.

== Relationship with humans ==
L. fasciatus plays a minor role in fisheries. Its main importance to humans is in the aquarium trade.

L. fasciatus swimming in captivity

=== In aquaria ===
L. fasciatus may jump if startled, necessitating aquariums with strong tops. In captivity, L. fasciatus can eat algae, vegetative matter, and flake food in addition to the worms, insects, and crustaceans it would catch in the wild. It can be kept with other fish, and has been described as "hardy".
