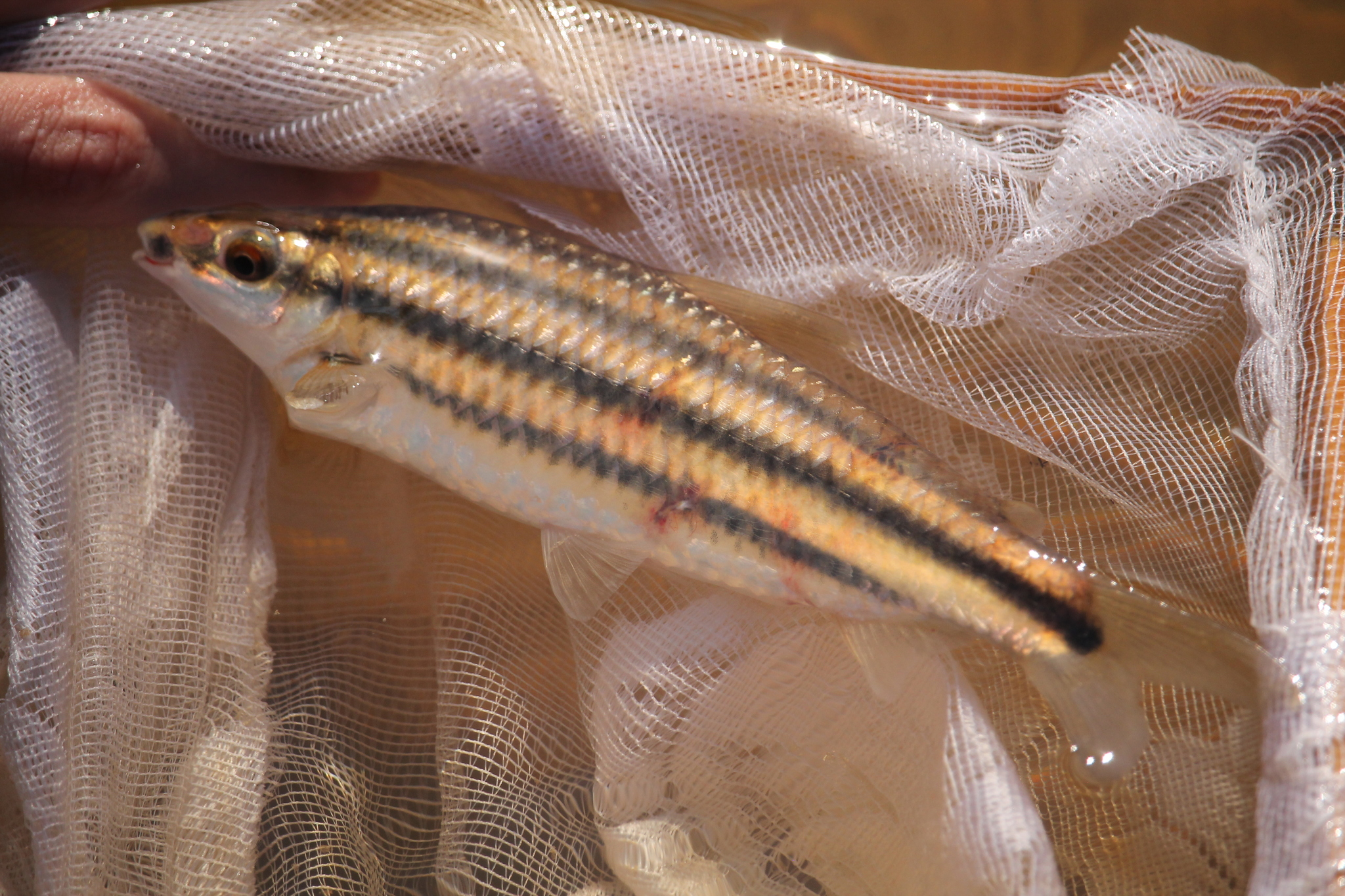

Conservation status
- Least Concern (IUCN 3.1)

Scientific classification
- Kingdom: Animalia
- Phylum: Chordata
- Class: Actinopterygii
- Order: Characiformes
- Family: Anostomidae
- Subfamily: Leporininae
- Genus: Brevidens; Birindelli, Sidlauskas & Melo, 2025
- Species: B. striatus

Binomial name
- Brevidens striatus (Kner, 1858)

Synonyms
- Leporinus striatus Kner, 1858

= Brevidens =

Genus of ray-finned fish

Brevidens is a monospecific genus of freshwater ray-finned fish belonging to the family Anostomidae, the toothed headstanders. The only species in this genus is Brevidens striatus, a fish found in tropical South America.

== Taxonomy ==
Brevidens was first proposed as a monospecific genus in 2025 by the Brazilian ichthyologists José Luís O. Birindelli, Brian L. Sidlauskas and Bruno F. Melo, with Leporinus striatus as its only species. Leporinus striatus was first formally described in 1858 by Rudolf Kner, with its type locality given as Irisanga and Caicara in Mato Grosso, Brazil. This species was originally classified in the genus Leporinus, but Birindelli, Sidlauskas and Melo found that this taxon was paraphyletic and, among other taxonomic changes, reclassified L. striatus in the new genus Brevidens. Brevidens is classified in the subfamily Leporininae of the family Anostomidae, the headstanders, in the suborder Characoidei of the order Characiformes.

== Etymology ==
Brevidens means "short tooth", an allusion to the short fourth tooth on the dentary, a diagnostic character of this genus. The specific name, striatus, means "striped", a reference to the longitudinal dark and pale stripes along the body of adults of this species.

== Description ==
Brevidens has a maximum total length of 25 cm (9.8 in). This taxon is distinguishable from other genera in this family in having a very small fourth tooth on the lower mandible, which has a clear gap between it and the other teeth. It also has a distinctive pattern of four horizontal black stripes along the body. Other features of this genus include three premaxillary teeth. In adults the mouth is subterminal with a red spot on the upper lip, and there are 16 rows of scales around the caudal peduncle. The body is fusiform and low, with a straight profile at the origin of the anal fin.

== Distribution and habitat ==
Brevidens is widespread throughout much of tropical South America, south to Argentina. It is a benthopelagic fish which is migratory within river systems, and found in fast-flowing water, being commoner in small tributaries than in the main channels.

== Biology ==
Brevidens is a diurnal, omnivorous fish with its diet being made up of plat matter, insects and molluscs. This species spawns throughout the year and undertakes short migrations to spawn, depositing eggs and not showing any parental care.
