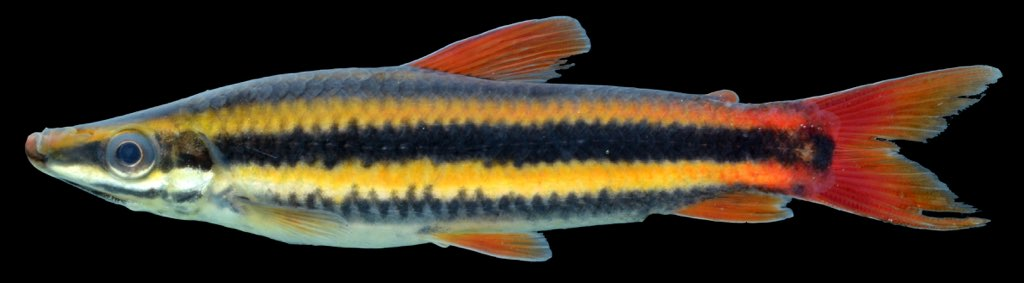

Conservation status
- Least Concern (IUCN 3.1)

Scientific classification
- Kingdom: Animalia
- Phylum: Chordata
- Class: Actinopterygii
- Division: Teleostei
- Order: Characiformes
- Family: Anostomidae
- Genus: Anostomus
- Species: A. anostomus

Binomial name
- Anostomus anostomus (Linnaeus, 1758)

Synonyms
- Salmo anostomus Linnaeus, 1758; Anostomus gronovii Schinz, 1822; Mormyrynchus gronoveii Swainson, 1839; Anostomus gronovii Müller & Troschel, 1844; Anostomus salmoneus Gronow, 1854

= Anostomus anostomus =

Species of fish

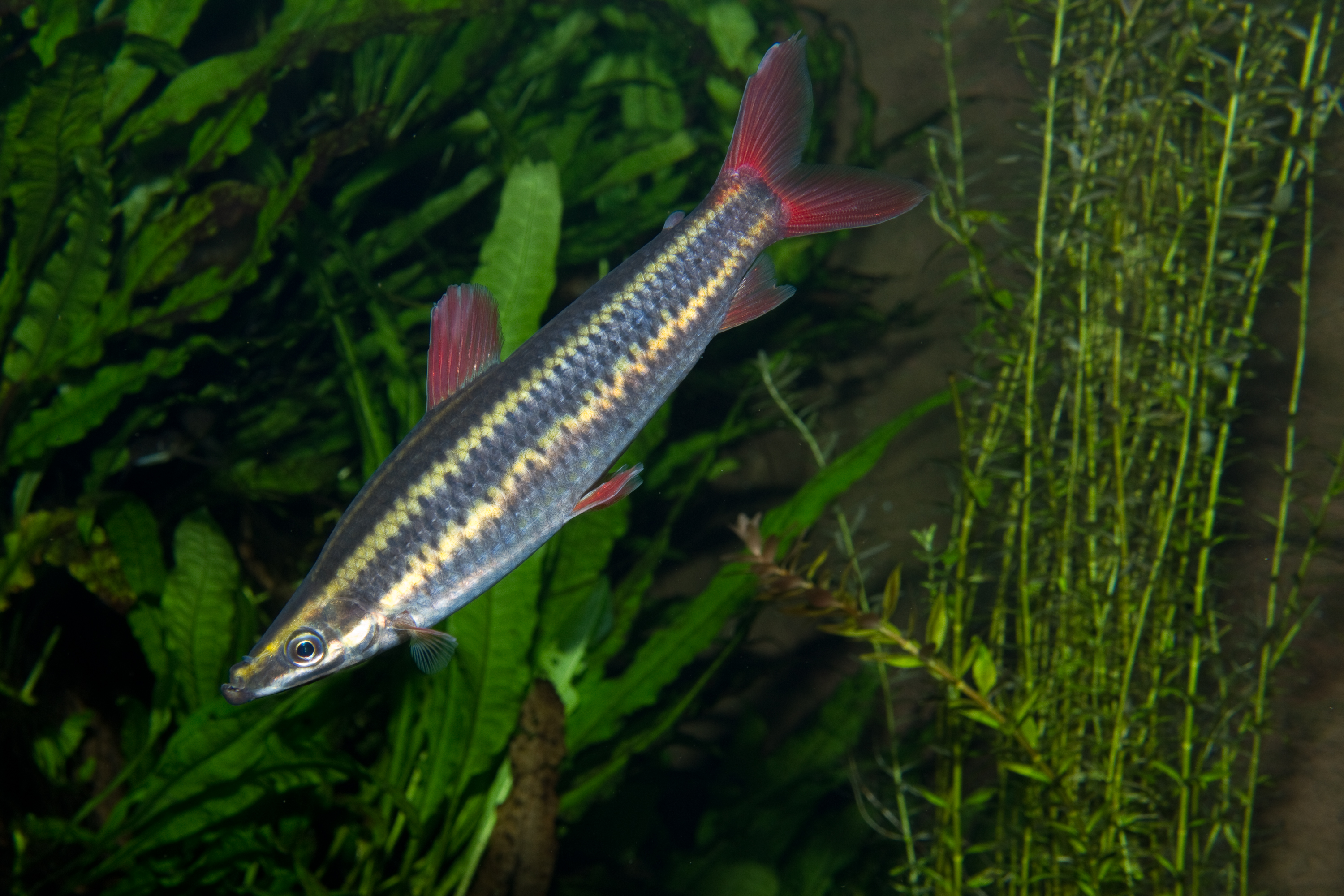
Striped headstander in an aquarium

Anostomus anostomus, also known as the striped headstander, striped anostomus, and striped anastomus, is a species of freshwater ray-finned fish belonging to the family Anostomidae, the toothed headstanders.

== Description ==
This species is pale peach to pinkish in colour, with long, black, lateral stripes. It grows to approximately 20 cm long. The central stripe terminates in an arch shape at the base of the dorsal find. Anostomus anostomus appears very similar to Anostomus ternetzi, but can be distinguished by the presence of red tinting on the fins.

== Distribution ==
Anostomus anostomus is native to South America, and can be found in the Orinoco River, in the Guayana Region of the Upper Amazon.

== Diet ==
This species is both a limnivore and omnivore.
