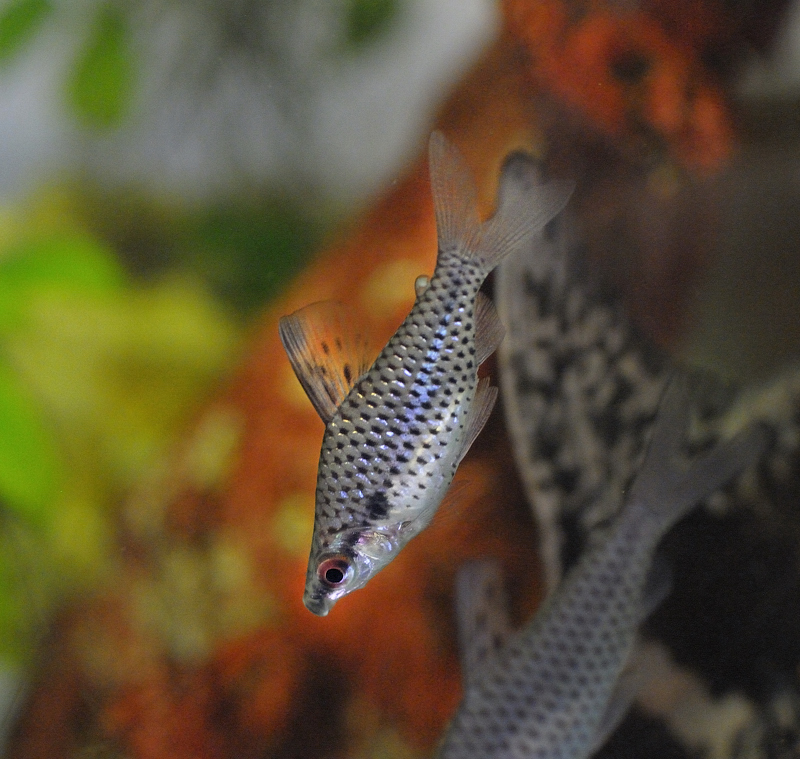
- Chilodus punctatus, an aquarium fish native to rivers in South America

Scientific classification
- Kingdom: Animalia
- Phylum: Chordata
- Class: Actinopterygii
- Division: Teleostei
- Order: Characiformes
- Family: Chilodidae
- Genus: Chilodus; J. P. Müller & Troschel, 1844

Type species
- Chilodus punctatus J. P. Müller & Troschel, 1844

= Chilodus =

Genus of fishes

Chilodus is a genus of freshwater ray-finned fishes belonging to the family Chilodidae, the headstanders. The fishes in this genus are from South America. They live in the Orinoco and Amazon Basins, as well as in various rivers in the Guianas.

== Species ==
The currently described, valid species in this genus are:

- Chilodus fritillus Vari & Ortega, 1997
- Chilodus gracilis Isbrücker & Nijssen, 1988
- Chilodus punctatus J. P. Müller & Troschel, 1844
- Chilodus zunevei Puyo, 1946
