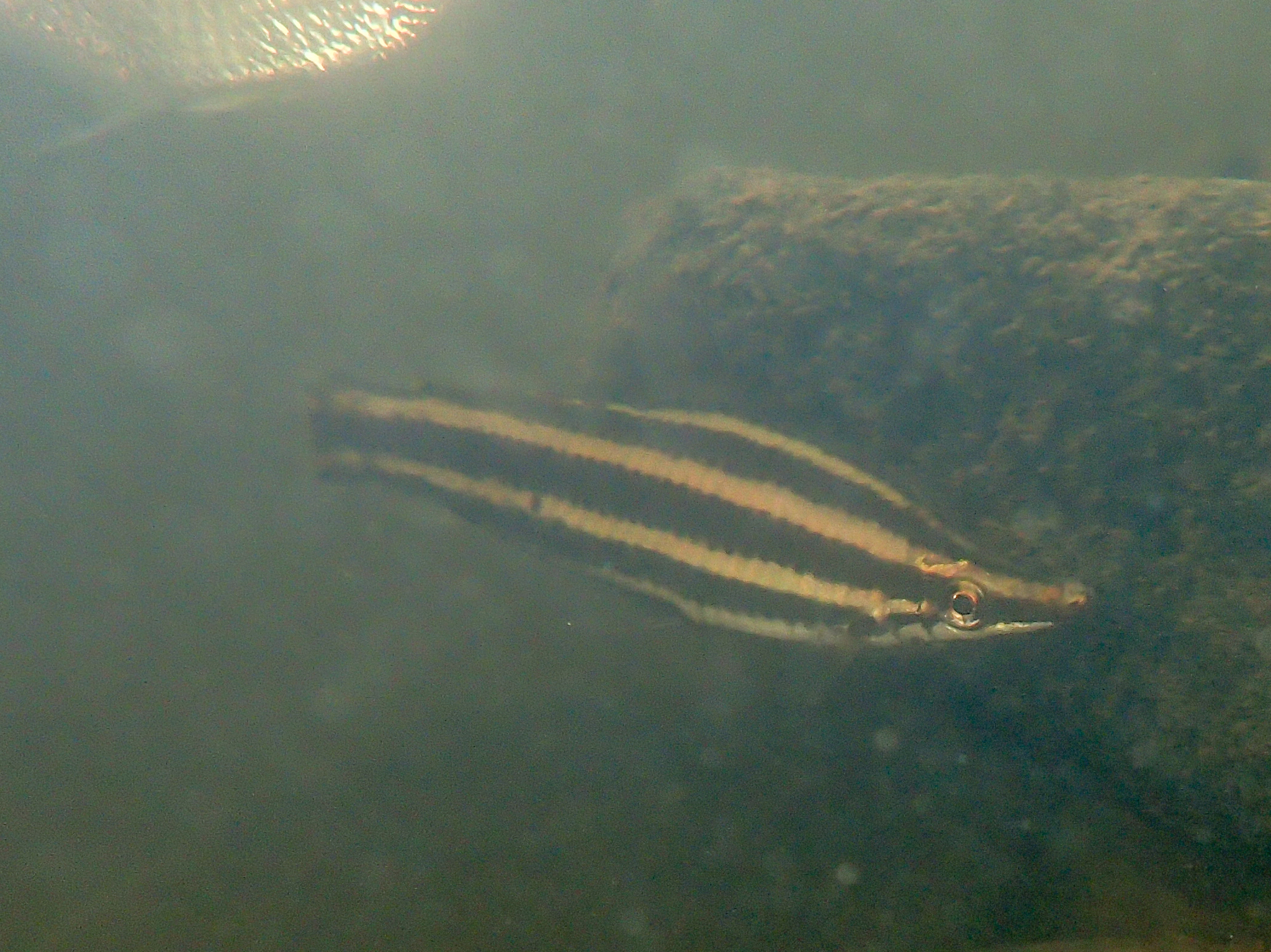
- Petulanos brevior

Scientific classification
- Kingdom: Animalia
- Phylum: Chordata
- Class: Actinopterygii
- Order: Characiformes
- Family: Anostomidae
- Subfamily: Anostominae
- Genus: Petulanos; Sidlauskas & Vari, 2008

Type species
- Anostomus plicatus C. H. Eigenmann, 1912

= Petulanos =

Genus of fishes

Petulanos is a genus of freshwater ray-finned fishes belonging to the family Anostomidae, the toothed headstanders. from South America.

== Species ==
Petulanos contains the following species:

- Petulanos brevior (Géry, 1961)
- Petulanos intermedius (Winterbottom, 1980)
- Petulanos plicatus (C. H. Eigenmann, 1912)
- Petulanos spiloclistron (Winterbottom 1974)
