= Headstander =

Species of fish

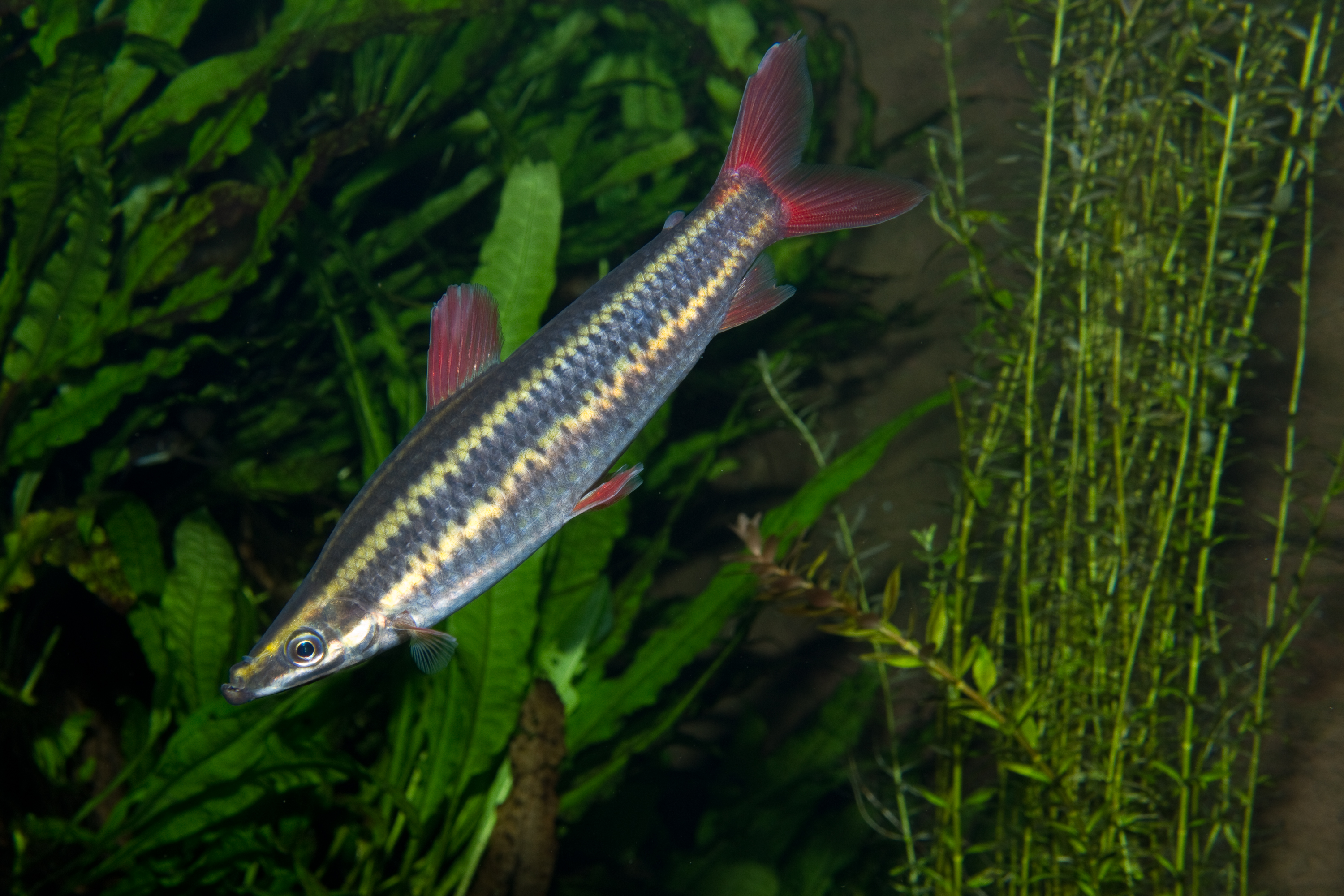
Anostomus anostomus, (striped headstander)

A headstander is any of several species of South American fish, including Anostomus ternetzi, Anostomus anostomus (family Anostomidae) and members of genus Chilodus from the family Chilodidae. The name derives from their habit of swimming at a 45° angle, head pointed downwards, as if "standing on their heads".

== About ==
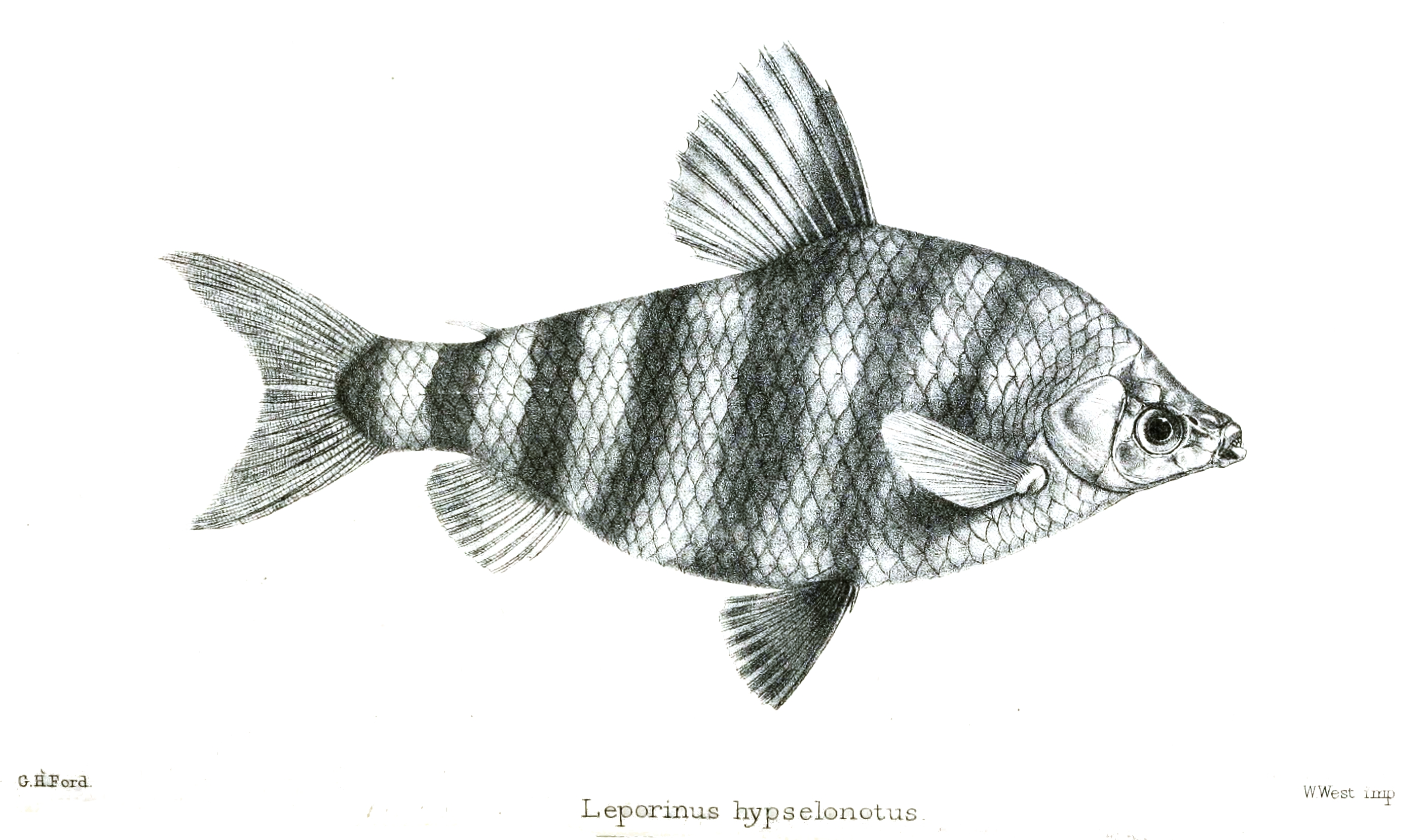
Marbled headstander

Headstanders are a group of freshwater fishes that live in streams of South America. Some species, such as Chilodus punctatus and C. gracilis, are common aquarium fishes as well. In nature, they are predominantly found in shallow streams with strong currents and a lot of algae, which they feed off of. They prefer slightly acidic water with medium hardness. The headstander will eat almost any kind of food, but mostly enjoy hair algae. Some headstanders can reach up to 12 cm (4 3/4 inches) in length. They tend to be very active, sensitive to shadows, and like to jump. They also have a tendency to be slightly aggressive. In aquaria, they are most peaceful when kept as a single specimens or in groups of more than 6.
