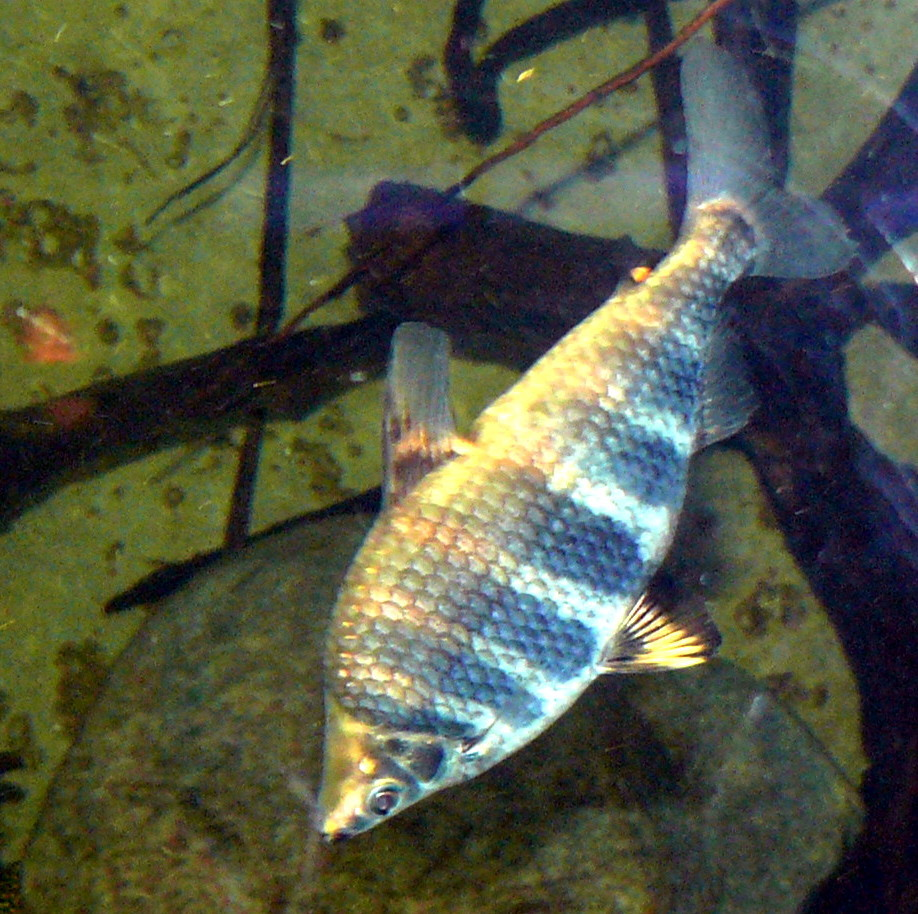

Conservation status
- Least Concern (IUCN 3.1)

Scientific classification
- Kingdom: Animalia
- Phylum: Chordata
- Class: Actinopterygii
- Order: Characiformes
- Family: Anostomidae
- Genus: Abramites
- Species: A. hypselonotus

Binomial name
- Abramites hypselonotus (Günther, 1868)

Synonyms
- Leporinus hypselonotus Günther, 1868; Leporinus solarii Holmberg, 1891; Abramites microcephalus Norman, 1926; Abramites ternetzi Norman, 1926; Leporinus nigripinnis Meinken, 1935

= Abramites hypselonotus =

Species of fish

Abramites hypselonotus – known as the marbled headstander or the high-backed headstander – is a member of the family Anostomidae of the order Characiformes. Under normal fish classifying rules, the marbled headstander would be classified as a surface dweller. In reality, marbled headstanders – like all headstanders – inhabit the middle and lower portions of the aquarium. In the wild, headstanders are often found face down, tail up in narrow vertical rocky fissures.

== Description ==
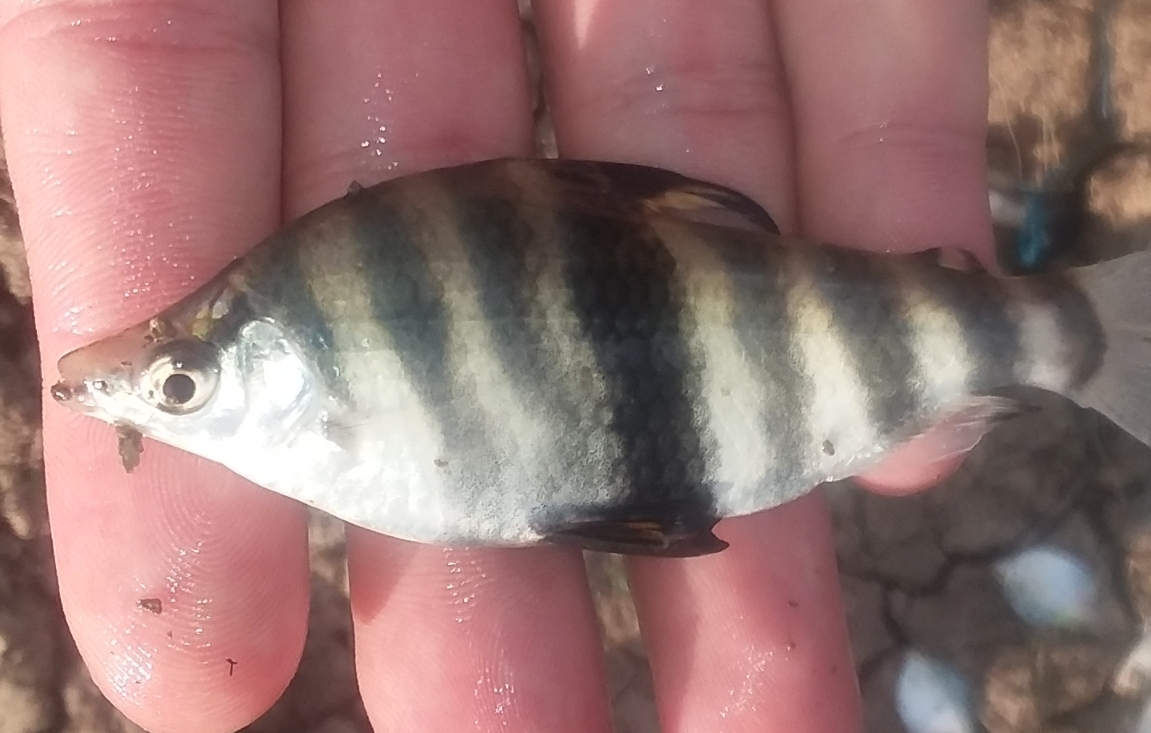
In Bolivia

Marble headstanders are generally identified by their high backs, pointed snout, diamond-shaped body, brown markings on pelvic fin, wavy dark brown bands, and a dark line at the base of the caudal peduncle. The marble headstander's full adult size is roughly 5 in (13 cm), on both sides. They are among the rarely introduced representatives of the Anostomidae and the males are more contrasted than the females.

== Distribution and habitat ==
The marbled headstander generally inhabits streams and rivers of the Orinoco and Amazon river systems. Headstanders most commonly inhabit very fast flowing waters in rocky stretches of river.

== Diet and feeding behaviour ==
The marble headstander is a predominantly herbivorous fish and as such should be given a high vegetation diet. In addition to processed food, it will readily accept (and probably enjoy) lettuce leaves, and peas. They will also accept mosquito larvae and bloodworms.

== Aquarium care ==
In the aquarium, the marble headstander is known as a peaceful inhabitant. They are completely docile as juveniles, both towards other fish and members of their own species. As they get older, they should be kept either as a single headstander or a group of seven or more in a tank, as they tend to fight amongst themselves in smaller groups. They are still generally peaceful towards other fish.

Due to the high demand of plant food, robust plants have a small chance of survival due to the sprouting of shoots. A socialization should be done with other great tetras that have similar claims. Keep marble headstanders in a rocky, heavily planted aquarium for them to explore. Too-small aquariums lead to increased quarrels between conspecifics, which can be avoided by sufficiently offered hiding places with roots and stone structures, consisting of cracks and crevices. If there is not enough vegetation in its diet, it will devour aquarium plants.

=== Temperature, pH, and salinity ===
These fish can tolerate a pH from 6–7.5, but prefer slightly acidic water. They like soft water ranging from 2–15 dH, and require a temperature of 73–82 °F (23–28 °C).
