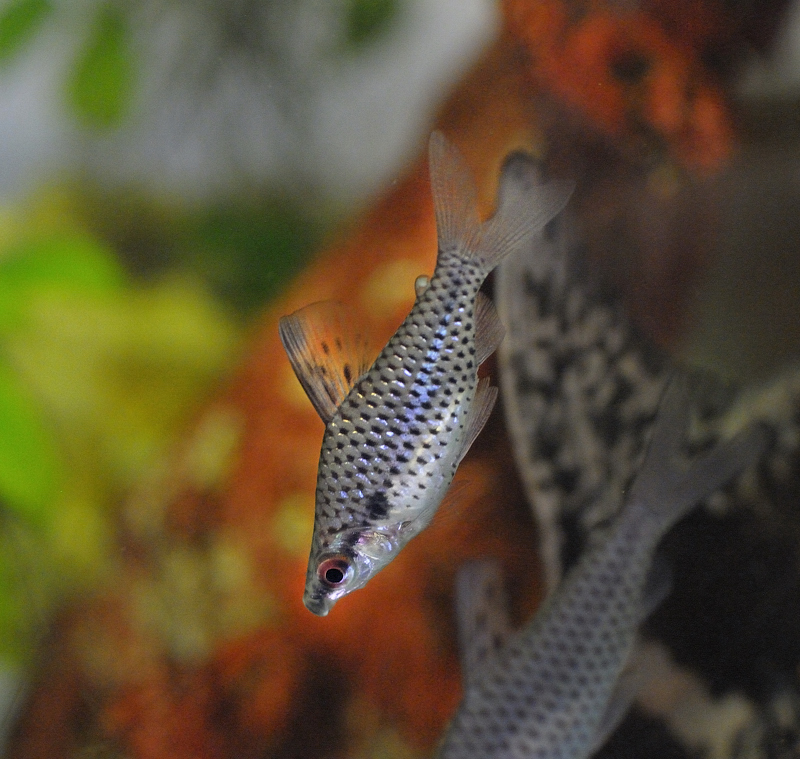
- Chilodus sp.

Scientific classification
- Kingdom: Animalia
- Phylum: Chordata
- Class: Actinopterygii
- Order: Characiformes
- Suborder: Characoidei
- Family: Chilodidae; C. H. Eigenmann, 1903

Genera
- 2, See text

Synonyms
- Chilodontidae Eigenmann, 1903

= Chilodidae =

Family of fishes

The Chilodidae, or headstanders, are a small family of freshwater characiform fishes found in northern and central South America. This family is closely related to the family Anostomidae and is sometimes treated as a subfamily, Chilodinae, within Anostomidae.

This family was formerly referred to as "Chilodontidae". Due to issues of homonymy with two other family-rank names called "Chilodontidae", the fish family was required to change spelling to Chilodidae.

Chilodids have colourful markings, making them popular in aquariums. They are small fish, all less than 7 cm (2.8 in) in adult length, and are distinguished by their habitual head-down postures.

== Genera ==
This family currently contains two genera:

- Genus Caenotropus Günther, 1864 (4 species)
- Genus Chilodus Müller & Troschel, 1844 (4 species)
