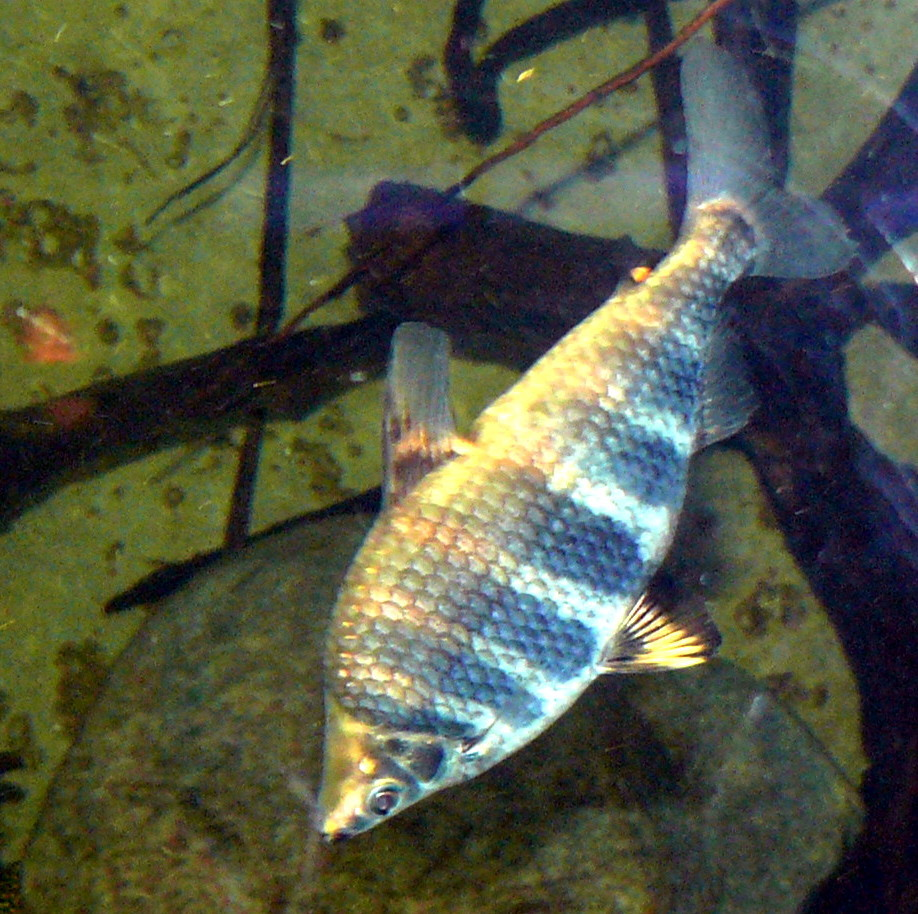
- Abramites hypselonotus in headstander swimming pose

Scientific classification
- Kingdom: Animalia
- Phylum: Chordata
- Class: Actinopterygii
- Order: Characiformes
- Suborder: Characoidei
- Family: Anostomidae; Günther, 1864

Type genus
- Anostomus Scopoli, 1777

Genera
- 17, see text

= Anostomidae =

Anostomidae Temporal range: Middle Miocene–present

Family of fishes

The Anostomidae are a family of ray-finned fishes that belong to the order Characiformes. Closely related to the Chilodidae and formerly included with them, the Anostomidae contain about 150 described species. Commonly known as anostomids, they are found in freshwater habitats from the Río Atrato in northernmost South America to warm-temperate central Argentina; they are of Amazon origin, with few found west of the Andes (mainly in Colombia and Venezuela). Their scientific name approximately means "mouth on top", from Ancient Greek áno- (ἄνω) "up" (as an adverb) + stóma (στόμᾶ) "mouth", in reference to the arrangement of these fishes' mouth opening.

== Description ==
Anostomids have elongated bodies ranging from 15 to 60 cm (5.9 to 23.6 in) in length; their shape varies between fusiform and deeper-bodied, but even the latter are only moderately laterally. They have elongated, tapering heads with rather long, straight snouts, and small apical to upturned mouths immediately at or near the snout tip. This family contains many headstanders, which habitually swim with their heads pointing from 45° up to 90° downwards; most feed on plants near the bottom, while others also eat detritus and invertebrates picked up from river- or lakebeds. Adults guard the eggs after spawning. Anostomidae are generally considered edible, and some of the larger species are caught for food on a regular basis, much like large Leuciscinae (which are superficially similar Cypriniformes) are in the temperate Northern Hemisphere.

Their jaws are rather short, with the maxillary bone small and excluded from the mouth opening, while the ascending process of the premaxilla is triangular in overall shape and robustly developed. One row of six or eight curved teeth occur in each jaw, arranged by length in a step-like fashion, with the front teeth being the longest; the pharyngeal teeth are enlarged and have two or more cusps each.

Anostomid gill openings are small, with the gill membranes firmly joined to the isthmus; the ligament between the interopercle and the mouth is elongated and the interopercle is clearly separated from the retroarticular. On the sides of the preopercle is a large, elongated protrusion, where the powerful jaw adductor muscles attach. The third epibranchial gill arch has a curved anterior process which extends medially over the dorsal surface of the fourth infrapharyngobranchial arch. The circumorbital bone series is complete and includes a supraorbital bone, and at least four, often more, of the forward ribs are united by two or more intercostal ligaments.

The lateral line is complete, contains 33-44 perforated scales, and runs along the midline of the body. The dentary bears a short lateral-line canal ending at or shortly behind mid-length, and altogether the lateral-line canals of the head are divided into at least two ossified tubes. All anostomids have an adipose fin; their dorsal fin contains one and 11, the anal fin one and 9, and the pelvic fins one and 8-9 hard and soft rays, respectively.

== Systematics and evolution ==
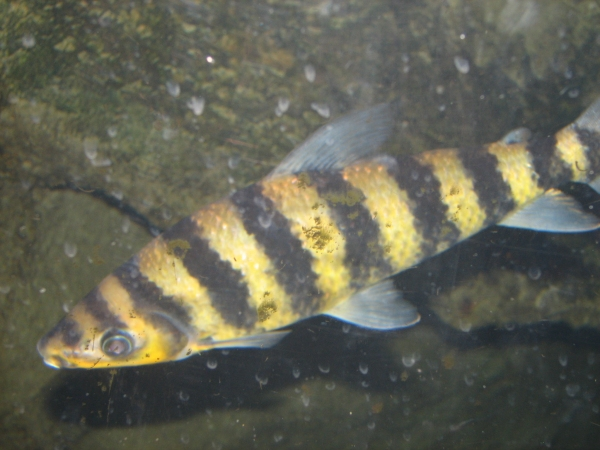
Black-banded Leporinus (Leporinus fasciatus), the type species of Leporinus

This family is in all probability monophyletic as traditionally defined. Several attempts to delimit subfamilies have taken place, and several of the proposed groupings indeed correspond to clades within this family. Leporellus has long been recognized as the basal-most living anostomid genus, due to its many plesiomorphies shared with the Chilodidae and its peculiar apomorphies, and separated as a monotypic subfamily by some. A large clade of "modern" genera was treated as Anostominae by some authors; others considered that subfamily more inclusive. The latter view was later found to be incorrect, as it includes a large number of lineages that are really basal members of the family and should not be treated as a subfamily.

More recent studies, incorporating phylogenetic evidence, have divided up the family into three subfamilies. Several genera (Megaleporinus, Insperanos, and Brevidens) have also been split out of Leporinus to maintain it as a monophyletic genus.

=== Genera ===
The genera of Anostomidae are:

- Subfamily Leporellinae C. H. Eigenmann, 1910 (striped tail headstanders)
  - Genus Leporellus Lütken, 1875
- Subfamily Anostominae Günther, 1864 (slender headstanders)
  - Genus Anostomus Scopoli, 1777
  - Genus Gnathodolus Myers, 1927
  - Genus Petulanos Sidlauskas & Vari, 2008
  - Genus Pseudanos Winterbottom, 1980
  - Genus Sartor Myers & de Carvalho, 1959
  - Genus Synaptolaemus Myers & Fernández-Yépez, 1950
- Subfamily Leporininae Eigenmann, 1912
  - Genus Abramites Fowler, 1906
  - Genus Anostomoides Pellegrin, 1909
  - Genus Brevidens Birindelli, Sidlauskas & Melo, 2025
  - Genus Hypomasticus Borodin, 1929
  - Genus Insperanos Assega, Sidlauskas & Birindelli, 2021
  - Genus Laemolyta Cope, 1872
  - Genus Leporinus Agassiz, 1829
  - Genus Megaleporinus Ramírez, Birindelli & Galetti, 2017
  - Genus Rhytiodus Kner, 1858
  - Genus Schizodon Agassiz, 1829

In Brazil, many species of Leporinus, Rhytiodus, and Schizodon are called aracu.

=== Evolution and fossil record ===
The taxon Anostominae is also used to denote the entire family in outdated treatments, where the name "Anostomidae" is applied to the entire Anostomoidea (and sometimes even more distant relatives). In that respect, agreement is widespread today that the closest living relatives of the Anostomidae sensu stricto are the Chilodidae headstanders, the toothless characins (Curimatidae) and the flannel-mouthed characins (Prochilodontidae).

The origin of the Anostomidae can be quite confidently placed in the Paleogene, and somewhat less securely in late Paleogene, based on various evidence. For one, the biogeography of the family, with some very basal taxa found west of the Andes, indicates it was already well distinct when the northern part of that mountain range uplifted at the end of the Middle Miocene about 12 million years ago (Mya). Then, some scant but highly informative fossil evidence assigned to this family: a premaxillary tooth was found in the Colombian Villavieja Formation and dated to the Laventan age about 13.5-11.5 Mya, while some pharyngeal teeth and other jaw parts found near Cuenca, Ecuador in the Cuenca basin (a structural basin) are about 19 million years old. The fossil remains resemble Leporinus and were assigned to the living genus, but given its paraphyly and rather basal position, until more fossils are found the known remains can only be considered fairly basal Anostomidae, incertae sedis, but probably close to the Leporinus assemblage. The fossil Leporinus species Leporinus scalabrinii, whose fossilized skull was previously thought to belong to a primate, is known from the Late Miocene of Argentina.

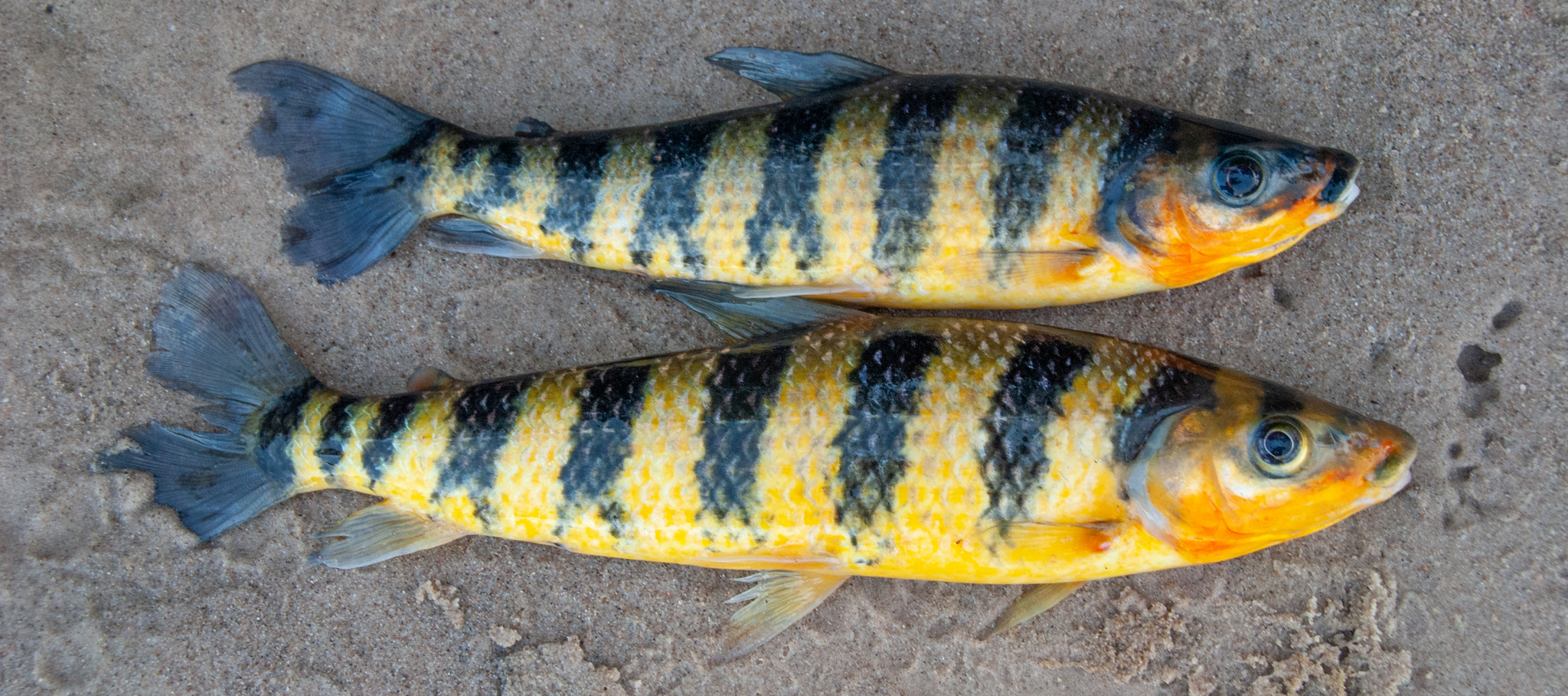
Leporinus fasciatus

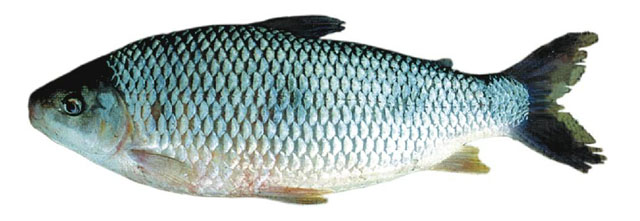
Megaleporinus obtusidens

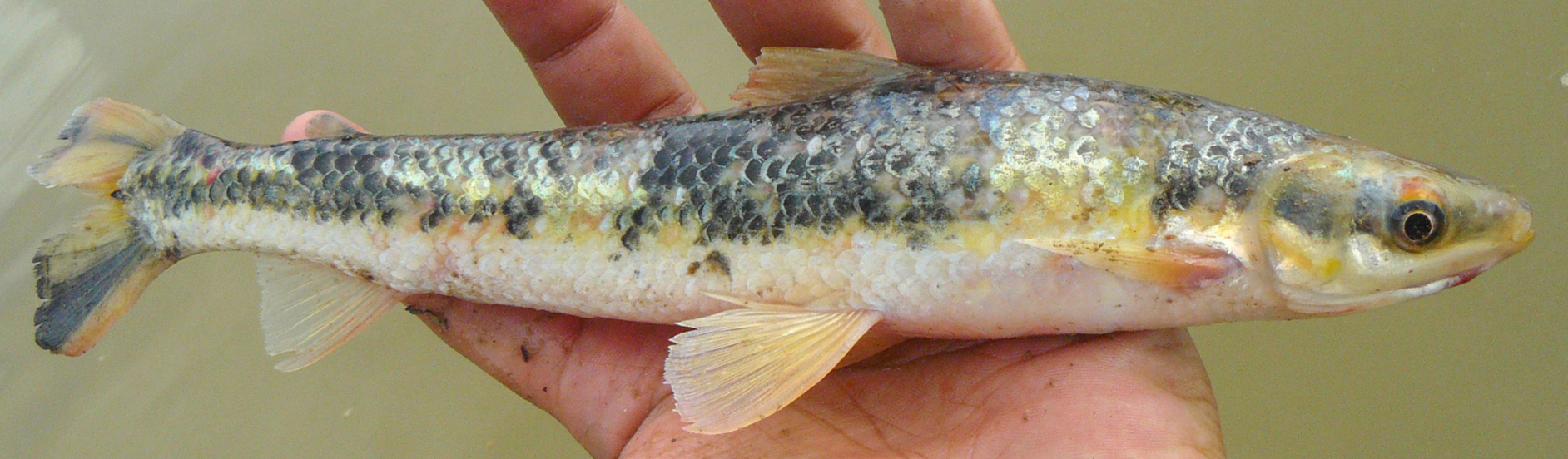
Rhytiodus argenteofuscus

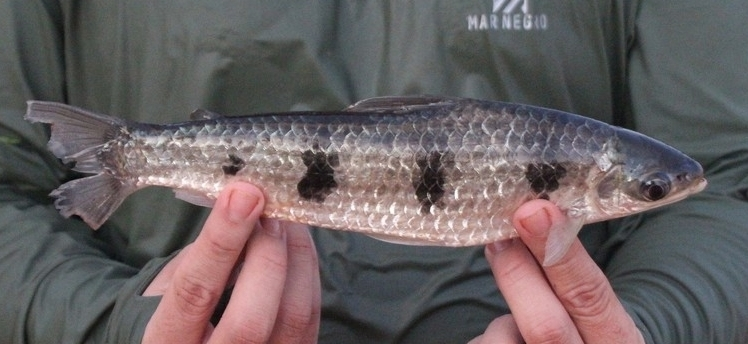
Schizodon borellii

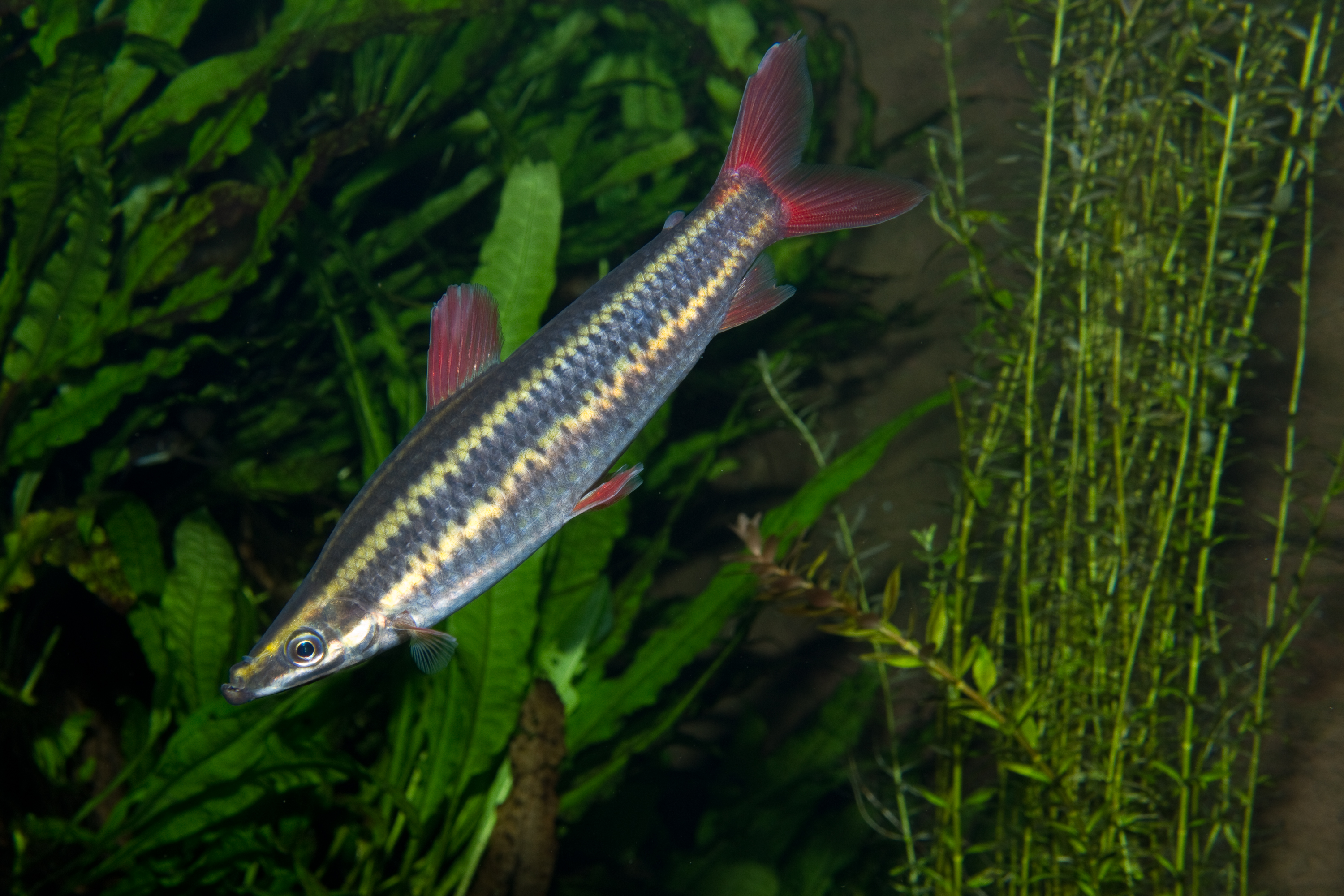
Anostomus anostomus

Cyphocharax mosesi, a fossil toothless characin found in Brazil, lived at the Oligocene-Miocene boundary about 23 Mya. Thus, at that time, the Anostomoidea families must have already been well distinct by that point. Phylogenetic evidence suggests that the Anostomidae diverged from their closest relatives during the Late Paleocene, about 59 million years ago, with the three subfamilies diverging from one another around the Middle Eocene (45 to 40 Mya).
