= Agra dable =

Scientific classification
- Kingdom: Animalia
- Phylum: Arthropoda
- Class: Insecta
- Order: Coleoptera
- Suborder: Adephaga
- Family: Carabidae
- Genus: Agra
- Species: A. dable

Binomial name
- Agra dable Erwin, 2002

Species of beetle

Agra dable is a species of carabid beetle. The holotype was collected in Costa Rica and first described to science in 2002.

== Description ==
Agra dable measure 14.5–18.0 mm in length and 4.28–4.70 mm in width. They are coloured black and shiny, with the tips of the mandibles red. They are very similar to Agra solisi.

== Etymology ==
Terry L. Erwin, who described the species, explained that the specific epithet of the binomial nomenclature is dable because "dable, is part of the Spanish word, agradable, meaning "pleasing."

Other species in the genus Agra named by Erwin include Agra liv, named after Liv Tyler, and Agra schwarzeneggeri, named after Arnold Schwarzenegger.
