= Agra catbellae =

Scientific classification
- Kingdom: Animalia
- Phylum: Arthropoda
- Clade: Pancrustacea
- Class: Insecta
- Order: Coleoptera
- Suborder: Adephaga
- Family: Carabidae
- Genus: Agra
- Species: A. catbellae

Binomial name
- Agra catbellae Erwin, 2002

Species of beetle

Agra catbellae is a species of carabid beetle named after the actress Catherine Bell. The holotype was collected in Costa Rica and first described to science in 2002.

== Etymology ==
Terry L. Erwin, who described the species, explained that the binomial nomenclature is catbellae because it is the "combined name of the actress starring on the then-current TV program JAG, Catherine Bell. These beetles share the forest with an elegant cat, the Jaguar".

Other species in the genus Agra named by Erwin include Agra liv, named after Liv Tyler, and Agra schwarzeneggeri, named after Arnold Schwarzenegger.

== See also ==
- List of organisms named after famous people (born 1950–1974)
