= Halocoryza =

Scientific classification
- Kingdom: Animalia
- Phylum: Arthropoda
- Class: Insecta
- Order: Coleoptera
- Suborder: Adephaga
- Family: Carabidae
- Subfamily: Scaritinae
- Tribe: Clivinini
- Subtribe: Schizogeniina
- Genus: Halocoryza; Alluaud, 1919

Genus of beetles

Halocoryza is a genus of beetles in the family Carabidae, containing the following species:

- Halocoryza acapulcana D. R. Whitehead, 1966
- Halocoryza arenaria (Darlington, 1939)
- Halocoryza maindroni Alluaud, 1919
- Halocoryza whiteheadiana Erwin, 2011

== Halocoryza acapulcana ==
Halocoryza acapulcana beetles can be found shores of islands in the Atlantic Ocean, Pacific Ocean, Indian Ocean, Sea of Cortés, Caribbean Sea, and the Gulf of Mexico, primarily in inter-tidal lagoons on the edge of mangroves. Acapulcana adults are most commonly found in March and August. Acapulcana are capable of flight, but are slow runners. Adults are attracted to light, and are nocturnal predators.

== Halocoryza arenaria ==
Halocoryza arenaria can be found on the shores of Barbados, Brazil, Dominican Republic, Grenada, Guadeloupe, Jamaica, Mexico(Qatar, Colombia), Panama, Puerto Rico, United States(Florida), Virgin Islands(St. John, St. Thomas). These beetles are possibly capable of flight, however this is unsure, and they are slow runners. Arenaria is a nocturnal predaceous species and often take cover in sand and seaweed piles. Most likely to be found March–April, July, and October.

== Halocoryza maindroni ==
Halocoryza maindroni are found low on shores of Comoros(Mayotte), Djibouti, Madagascar, Mauritius, Saudi Arabia, and Somalia. Adults live on the ground on coralline sands near coral reefs. Possibly has the ability of flight, however its main mode of transportation is walking despite being a slow running species. Found in January and October. Adults are nocturnal predators who take cover under seaweed just above high tide during the day.

== Halocoryza whiteheadiana ==
Named after Donald R. Whitehead, who had a keen interest in this species. This beetle can be found on Isla del Carmen(Baja California) in Mexico. possibly a flying species, however they are slow runners and strong burrowers.

== Appearance ==
Halocoryza are often red in color(the deepness of the color varies depending on species). They also have small mandibles and small antennae. The genus is typically small in size, shiny throughout whole body, and have small eyes.
