= Donald Whitehead =

Donald Whitehead may refer to:

- Donald S. Whitehead (1888–1957), Republican politician from Idaho
- Donald R. Whitehead (1938–1990), American entomologist
- Don Whitehead (1908–1981), American journalist
