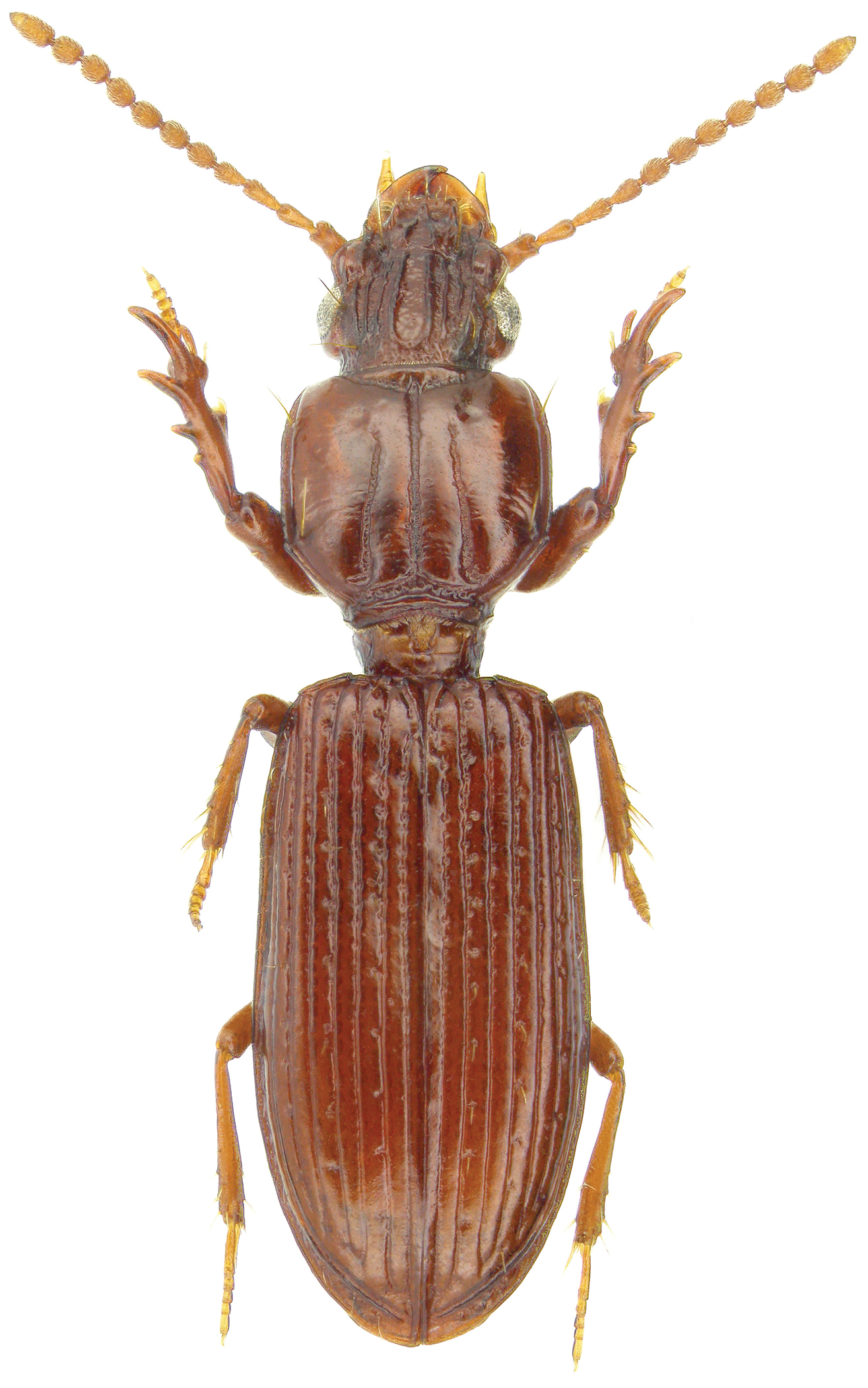
- Schizogenius amphibius

Scientific classification
- Kingdom: Animalia
- Phylum: Arthropoda
- Class: Insecta
- Order: Coleoptera
- Suborder: Adephaga
- Family: Carabidae
- Subtribe: Clivinina
- Genus: Schizogenius; Putzeys, 1846

= Schizogenius =

Genus of beetles

Schizogenius is a genus of beetles in the family Carabidae, containing the following species:

- Schizogenius amphibius (Haldeman, 1843)
- Schizogenius apicalis Putzeys, 1861
- Schizogenius arechavaletae Putzeys, 1866
- Schizogenius arimao Darlington, 1934
- Schizogenius auripennis H. W. Bates, 1881
- Schizogenius baenningeri Kult, 1950
- Schizogenius basalis Putzeys, 1866
- Schizogenius bicolor Whitehead, 1972
- Schizogenius brevicornis (Brullé, 1837)
- Schizogenius brevisetosus Whitehead, 1972
- Schizogenius capitalis Putzeys, 1861
- Schizogenius carinatus Whitehead, 1966
- Schizogenius cearaensis Whitehead, 1972
- Schizogenius chiricahuanus Whitehead, 1972
- Schizogenius clivinoides Putzeys, 1866
- Schizogenius costiceps Steinheil, 1869
- Schizogenius costipennis Whitehead, 1972
- Schizogenius crenulatus Leconte, 1852
- Schizogenius darlingtoni Kult, 1950
- Schizogenius depressus Leconte, 1852
- Schizogenius dilatus Whitehead, 1972
- Schizogenius dyschirioides Putzeys, 1861
- Schizogenius elongatus Kult, 1950
- Schizogenius emdeni Whitehead, 1972
- Schizogenius falli Whitehead, 1972
- Schizogenius ferrugineus Putzeys, 1846
- Schizogenius freyi Baehr, 1983
- Schizogenius gracilis Putzeys, 1846
- Schizogenius impressicollis Putzeys, 1846
- Schizogenius impuncticollis Whitehead, 1972
- Schizogenius interstriatus Putzeys, 1878
- Schizogenius iridescens (Putzeys, 1866)
- Schizogenius janae Kult, 1950
- Schizogenius kulti Whitehead, 1972
- Schizogenius leprieuri (Laporte, 1835)
- Schizogenius lindrothi Whitehead, 1972
- Schizogenius lineolatus (Say, 1823)
- Schizogenius litigiosus Fall, 1901
- Schizogenius longipennis Putzeys, 1866
- Schizogenius maculatus Kult, 1950
- Schizogenius multipunctatus Kult, 1950
- Schizogenius multisetosus H. W. Bates, 1891
- Schizogenius negrei Whitehead, 1972
- Schizogenius neovalidus Whitehead, 1972
- Schizogenius ocellatus Whitehead, 1972
- Schizogenius ochthocephalus Whitehead, 1972
- Schizogenius optimus H. W. Bates, 1881
- Schizogenius ozarkensis Whitehead, 1972
- Schizogenius pacificus Whitehead, 1972
- Schizogenius planulatus Leconte, 1863
- Schizogenius planuloides Whitehead, 1972
- Schizogenius pluripunctatus Leconte, 1852
- Schizogenius plurisetosus Whitehead, 1972
- Schizogenius putzeysii Kirsch, 1873
- Schizogenius pygmaeus Van Dyke, 1925
- Schizogenius quadripunctatus Putzeys, 1866
- Schizogenius quinquesulcatus Putzeys, 1861
- Schizogenius reichardti Whitehead, 1972
- Schizogenius riparius Putzeys, 1878
- Schizogenius sallei Putzeys, 1866
- Schizogenius scopaeus Whitehead, 1972
- Schizogenius sculptilis Whitehead, 1972
- Schizogenius sellatus Putzeys, 1866
- Schizogenius seticollis Fall, 1901
- Schizogenius strigicollis Putzeys, 1846
- Schizogenius sulcatulus Putzeys, 1846
- Schizogenius sulcifrons Putzeys, 1846
- Schizogenius suturalis Whitehead, 1972
- Schizogenius szekessyi Kult, 1950
- Schizogenius tenuis H. W. Bates, 1881
- Schizogenius tibialis Whitehead, 1972
- Schizogenius tristriatus Putzeys, 1846
- Schizogenius truquii Putzeys, 1866
- Schizogenius whiteheadi Nichols, 1982
- Schizogenius xanthopus (Brullé, 1837)
