= Agra cadabra =

Scientific classification
- Kingdom: Animalia
- Phylum: Arthropoda
- Clade: Pancrustacea
- Class: Insecta
- Order: Coleoptera
- Suborder: Adephaga
- Family: Carabidae
- Genus: Agra
- Species: A. cadabra

Binomial name
- Agra cadabra Erwin, 1986

Species of beetle

Agra cadabra is a species of beetle belonging to the genus Agra in the family Carabidae. Terry Erwin described it in 1986.

== Description ==
Agra cadabra has a dark reddish-brown body. The knees and edges of the last segment of the abdomen are dark. The surface is shiny. The pronotum is covered with fine, even bumps. The head is shorter than the pronotum, and in males, the back of the head is narrower. The back of the head is curved, especially in males. The prothorax is short and wider at the base than at the top, with slightly curved sides that lead to the front.

A. cadabra has elytra with a pattern of small bumps arranged in two rows, with light brown and black stripes with a metallic blue shine. These are short, flare out in the middle, and have a moderate curve with rounded sections. The design is simple, with vertical stripes, and the fifth internal line is darker.

== Distribution ==
Agra cadabra is found in the lowland tropical forests of the Atlantic Forest in southeastern Brazil.
