= Halocoryza acapulcana =

Scientific classification
- Kingdom: Animalia
- Phylum: Arthropoda
- Class: Insecta
- Order: Coleoptera
- Suborder: Adephaga
- Family: Carabidae
- Genus: Halocoryza
- Species: H. acapulcana

Binomial name
- Halocoryza acapulcana D. R. Whitehead, 1966

Species of beetle

Halocoryza acapulcana is a species of brown coloured ground beetle in the subfamily Scaritinae which can be found in Ecuador and Mexico.
