= Timocratica palpalis =

Scientific classification
- Kingdom: Animalia
- Phylum: Arthropoda
- Clade: Pancrustacea
- Class: Insecta
- Order: Lepidoptera
- Family: Depressariidae
- Genus: Timocratica
- Species: T. palpalis

Binomial name
- Timocratica palpalis (Zeller, 1877)

Synonyms
- Cryptolechia (Cryptolechia) palpalis Zeller, 1877; Stenoma auxoleuca Meyrick, 1925; Timocratica haywardi Busck, 1938

Species of moth

Timocratica palpalis is a moth of the family Depressariidae. It is found in Brazil (Espirito Santo, Bahia, Distrito Federal, Rio de Janeiro, Minas Gerais, Paraná, Rio Grande do Sul, Santa Catarina, São Paulo), Bolivia and Argentina.

== Food ==
The larvae feed on the bark of

- Acer saccharinum
- Acer platanoides
- Casuarina equisetifolia
- Belangera tomentosa
- Diospyros kaki
- Castanea sativa
- Quercus robus
- Persea americana
- Pleroma urvilleanum
- Tibouchina candolleiana
- Calycorectes pohlianus
- Campomanesia acida
- Eucalyptus alba
- Eucalyptus camaldulensis
- Eucalyptus ciriodora
- Eucalyptus saligna
- Eucalyptus tereticornis
- Eugenia brasiliensis
- Eugenia uniflora
- Eugenia involucrata
- Hexachlamyx edulis
- Marlierea tomentosa
- Myrcia fenzliana
- Myrciaria trunciflora
- Psidium guajava
- Psidium quineense
- Psidium humile
- Syzygium jambos
- Syzygium malaccense
- Platanus orientalis
- Macadamia ternifolia
- Punica granatum
- Cydonia vulgaris
- Eriobotrya japonica
- Malus domestica
- Malus sylvestris
- Prunus amygdalus
- Prunus armeniaca
- Prunus domestica
- Prunus persica
- Pyrus communis
- Pyrus sinensis
- Coffea arabica
- Salix viminalis
- Luehea divaricata
- Ulmus americana
