= Agra absurdis =

Scientific classification
- Kingdom: Animalia
- Phylum: Arthropoda
- Clade: Pancrustacea
- Class: Insecta
- Order: Coleoptera
- Suborder: Adephaga
- Family: Carabidae
- Genus: Agra
- Species: A. absurdis

Binomial name
- Agra absurdis Liebke, 1938

Species of beetle

Agra absurdis is a species of beetle in the family Carabidae. They are found in Brazil.
