= Agra santarosa =

Scientific classification
- Domain: Eukaryota
- Kingdom: Animalia
- Phylum: Arthropoda
- Class: Insecta
- Order: Coleoptera
- Suborder: Adephaga
- Family: Carabidae
- Genus: Agra
- Species: A. santarosa

Binomial name
- Agra santarosa Erwin, 2002

Species of beetle

Agra santarosa is a species of carabid beetle. The holotype was collected in Costa Rica and first described to science in 2002 by Terry L. Erwin.
