= Halocoryza whiteheadiana =

Scientific classification
- Kingdom: Animalia
- Phylum: Arthropoda
- Class: Insecta
- Order: Coleoptera
- Suborder: Adephaga
- Family: Carabidae
- Genus: Halocoryza
- Species: H. whiteheadiana

Binomial name
- Halocoryza whiteheadiana Erwin, 2011

Species of beetle

Halocoryza whiteheadiana is a species of brown coloured ground beetle in the subfamily Scaritinae which is endemic to Baja California Sur, Mexico.
