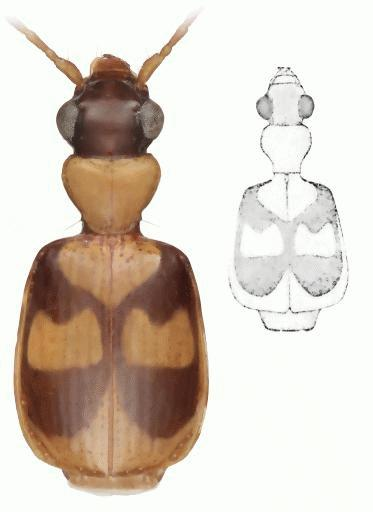
- Asklepia strandi

Scientific classification
- Kingdom: Animalia
- Phylum: Arthropoda
- Class: Insecta
- Order: Coleoptera
- Suborder: Adephaga
- Family: Carabidae
- Tribe: Odacanthini
- Genus: Asklepia; Liebke, 1938

= Asklepia =

Genus of beetles

Asklepia is a genus of beetle in the family Carabidae first described by Max Liebke in 1938. The genus is found in South America, from Colombia south to central Argentina. They measure 2–3.7 mm (0.079–0.146 in).

The genus names refers to the Greek god Asclepius (Asklepios), but the reason for this association is unknown.

== Species ==
Asklepia contains the following twenty-seven species:

- Asklepia adisi Erwin & Zamorano, 2014
- Asklepia asuncionensis Erwin & Zamorano, 2014
- Asklepia biolat Erwin & Zamorano, 2014
- Asklepia bracheia Zamorano & Erwin, 2014
- Asklepia campbellorum Zamorano & Erwin, 2014
- Asklepia cuiabaensis Erwin & Zamorano, 2014
- Asklepia demiti Erwin & Zamorano, 2014
- Asklepia duofos Zamorano & Erwin, 2014
- Asklepia ecuadoriana Erwin & Zamorano, 2014
- Asklepia geminata (Bates, 1871)
- Asklepia grammechrysea Zamorano & Erwin, 2014
- Asklepia hilaris (Bates, 1871)
- Asklepia kathleenae Erwin & Zamorano, 2014
- Asklepia laetitia Zamorano & Erwin, 2014
- Asklepia lebioides (Bates, 1871)
- Asklepia macrops Erwin & Zamorano, 2014
- Asklepia marchantaria Erwin & Zamorano, 2014
- Asklepia marituba Zamorano & Erwin, 2014
- Asklepia matomena Zamorano & Erwin, 2014
- Asklepia pakitza Erwin & Zamorano, 2014
- Asklepia paraguayensis Zamorano & Erwin, 2014
- Asklepia pulchripennis (Bates, 1871)
- Asklepia samiriaensis Zamorano & Erwin, 2014
- Asklepia stalametlitos Zamorano & Erwin, 2014
- Asklepia strandi Liebke, 1938
- Asklepia surinamensis Zamorano & Erwin, 2014
- Asklepia vigilante Erwin & Zamorano, 2014
