= Agra schwarzeneggeri =

Scientific classification
- Kingdom: Animalia
- Phylum: Arthropoda
- Clade: Pancrustacea
- Class: Insecta
- Order: Coleoptera
- Suborder: Adephaga
- Family: Carabidae
- Genus: Agra
- Species: A. schwarzeneggeri

Binomial name
- Agra schwarzeneggeri Erwin, 2002

Species of beetle

Agra schwarzeneggeri is a species of carabid beetle. It is named after the actor Arnold Schwarzenegger. The holotype was collected in Costa Rica and first described to science in 2002.

== Etymology ==
The binomial nomenclature references Schwarzenegger, because of the markedly developed '(biceps-like)' middle femora of the males. Erwin later remarked in an interview that his students had prepared an image of A. schwarzeneggeri and sent it out to Schwarzenegger himself: he signed it "Thanks for thinking of me - Arnold" and returned it.

Other species in the genus named by Terry L. Erwin include Agra liv, named after Liv Tyler, and Agra katewinsletae, named after Kate Winslet.

== Description ==
Agra schwarzeneggeri measure 14–17 mm (0.55–0.67 in) in length and 4.4–5.16 mm (0.173–0.203 in) in width.

== See also ==
- List of organisms named after famous people (born 1925–1949)
