= Agra vation =

Scientific classification
- Kingdom: Animalia
- Phylum: Arthropoda
- Clade: Pancrustacea
- Class: Insecta
- Order: Coleoptera
- Suborder: Adephaga
- Family: Carabidae
- Genus: Agra
- Species: A. vation

Binomial name
- Agra vation Erwin, 1983

Species of beetle

Agra vation is a species of carabid beetle, named as a pun on the word aggravation. Their carapace consists of iridescent tones of brown, red, or orange.

== Description ==
Like other members of the genus Agra, this species has a slender body adapted for life in trees, with long legs that allow it to move easily along branches and leaves.

== Habitat ==
Species of the genus Agra are typically found in tropical rainforest canopies, particularly in Neotropical regions such as Central and South America. They are arboreal, meaning they live primarily in trees rather than on the ground.

== Diet ==
Agra vation, like other carabid beetles, is believed to be a predatory species. It likely feeds on small insects and other arthropods found in the forest canopy.
