= Timocratica effluxa =

Scientific classification
- Kingdom: Animalia
- Phylum: Arthropoda
- Class: Insecta
- Order: Lepidoptera
- Family: Depressariidae
- Genus: Timocratica
- Species: T. effluxa

Binomial name
- Timocratica effluxa (Meyrick, 1930)

Synonyms
- Lychnocrates effluxa Meyrick, 1930

Species of moth

Timocratica effluxa is a moth in the family Depressariidae. It was described by Edward Meyrick in 1930. It is found in Bolivia.
