= Timocratica pompeiana =

Scientific classification
- Kingdom: Animalia
- Phylum: Arthropoda
- Class: Insecta
- Order: Lepidoptera
- Family: Depressariidae
- Genus: Timocratica
- Species: T. pompeiana

Binomial name
- Timocratica pompeiana Meyrick, 1925

Species of moth

Timocratica pompeiana is a moth in the family Depressariidae. It was described by Edward Meyrick in 1925. It is found in Peru.

The wingspan is about 65 mm. The forewings are brownish fuscous, obscurely and suffusedly irrorated grey whitish towards the base and costa. The costal edge is fulvous, edged beneath with dark brown suffusion and there are three straight oblique parallel indistinct dark brown lines crossing the disc but not reaching the margins, the third directed towards the termen below the middle. The hindwings are ochreous yellowish.
