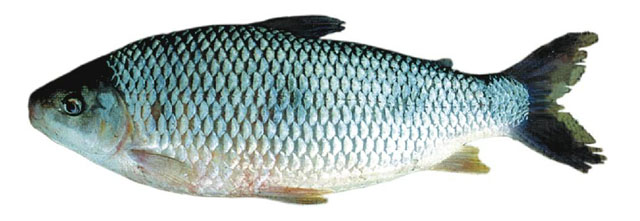
- Arhinolemur obtusidens

Scientific classification
- Kingdom: Animalia
- Phylum: Chordata
- Class: Actinopterygii
- Division: Teleostei
- Order: Characiformes
- Family: Anostomidae
- Subfamily: Leporininae
- Genus: Arrhinolemur; Ameghino, 1898

Type species
- †Arhinolemur scalabrinii Ameghino, 1898

Synonyms
- Megaleporinus J. L. Ramírez, Birindelli & Galetti, 2017

= Arhinolemur =

Arhinolemur Temporal range: Late Miocene to present

Genus of fishes

Arhinolemur is a genus of freshwater ray-finned fish belonging to the family Anostomidae,the toothed headstanders. The fishes in this genus are found in South America. The type species, Arrhinolemur scalabrinii, known from the late Miocene of Entre Ríos in Argentina, was misidentified as a species of primate until it was recognized as belonging to Anostomidae.

== Taxonomy ==
Arhinolemus was first proposed as a genus in 1898 by the Argentine naturalist, paleontologist, anthropologist and zoologist Florentino Ameghino when he described a fossil skull excavated from cliffs in the Paraná Formation in the Entre Ríos Province of Argentina by Pedro Scalabrini. Ameghino identified the fossil as a strepsirrhine primate, related to lemurs, but in 2012 it was recognised as a fish in the family Anostomidae. In 2026 the fossil was redescribed using micro CT data and comparison of bones and it was shown that was a member of the clade known as Megaleporinus, which had been proposed by Jorge Luis Ramirez, José Luis Olivan Birindelli and Pedro Manoel Galetti Jr. in 2017. As Arhinolemur predates Megaleporinus then the latter name is a junior synonym of the former. Eschmeyer's Catalog of Fishes classifies the genus Arhinolemur in the subfamily Leporininae of the toothed headstander family Anostomoidae in the characin order Characiformes.

== Species ==
These are the currently recognized species in this genus:

- Arhinolemur brinco (Birindelli, Britski & Garavello, 2013)
- Arhinolemur conirostris (Steindachner, 1875)
- Arhinolemur elongatus (Valenciennes, 1850)
- Arhinolemur gaiero Birindelli, Britski & Ramirez, 2020
- Arhinolemur garmani (Borodin, 1929)
- Arhinolemur macrocephalus (Garavello & Britski, 1988)
- Arhinolemur muyscorum (Steindachner, 1900)
- Arhinolemur obtusidens (Valenciennes, 1837)
- Arhinolemur piavussu (Britski, Birindelli & Garavello, 2012)
- Arhinolemur reinhardti (Lütken, 1875)
- †Arhinolemur scalabrinii Ameghino, 1898
- Arhinolemur trifasciatus (Steindachner, 1876)

== Etymology ==
Arhinolemus is a name which prefixes a-, meaning "without", to rhinos, meaning "snout", and lemur, the primate group of Madagascar. The type species of this genus, A. scalabrinii, was originally identified as a primate, only being identified as an anastomid fish in 2012.
