= Timocratica leucocapna =

Scientific classification
- Kingdom: Animalia
- Phylum: Arthropoda
- Class: Insecta
- Order: Lepidoptera
- Family: Depressariidae
- Genus: Timocratica
- Species: T. leucocapna

Binomial name
- Timocratica leucocapna (Meyrick, 1925)

Synonyms
- Lychnocrates leucocapna Meyrick, 1925

Species of moth

Timocratica leucocapna is a moth of the family Depressariidae. It is found in Colombia, Costa Rica, Peru and Venezuela.

The wingspan is about 46 mm. The forewings are fuscous suffused with dark fuscous with an orange costal band from the base to two-fifths, the costal edge dark fuscous posteriorly, a short suffused white streak within it from the base and some white suffusion towards the base of the dorsum. There is a large patch of iridescent white suffusion occupying most of the area beyond the cell but not extending to the margin, and crossed by dark fuscous veins. The hindwings are light ochreous yellow, the dorsum deeper.
