= Timocratica amseli =

Scientific classification
- Domain: Eukaryota
- Kingdom: Animalia
- Phylum: Arthropoda
- Class: Insecta
- Order: Lepidoptera
- Family: Depressariidae
- Genus: Timocratica
- Species: T. amseli

Binomial name
- Timocratica amseli Duckworth, 1962

Synonyms
- Timocratica albella Amsel, 1956 (preocc. Zeller, 1839)

Species of moth

Timocratica amseli is a moth in the family Depressariidae. It was described by W. Donald Duckworth in 1962. It is found in Venezuela.
