= Timocratica fraternella =

Scientific classification
- Domain: Eukaryota
- Kingdom: Animalia
- Phylum: Arthropoda
- Class: Insecta
- Order: Lepidoptera
- Family: Depressariidae
- Genus: Timocratica
- Species: T. fraternella

Binomial name
- Timocratica fraternella (Busck, 1910)

Synonyms
- Stenoma fraternella Busck, 1910

Species of moth

Timocratica fraternella is a moth in the family Depressariidae. It was described by August Busck in 1910. It is found in Costa Rica.

The wingspan is 34–38 mm. The forewings are dark brownish fuscous with a dusting of silvery scales and three oblique dark-brown cross lines. These are about equivalent and all nearly parallel, one from the basal third of the costa, one from the middle, and one from the apical third, the last nearly straight across the tip of the wing, the two others gently curved outward as they approach the dorsal edge, which they do not quite reach. The hindwings are dark fuscous. All wings have bright-yellow costal edges on the underside.
