= Timocratica grandis =

Scientific classification
- Domain: Eukaryota
- Kingdom: Animalia
- Phylum: Arthropoda
- Class: Insecta
- Order: Lepidoptera
- Family: Depressariidae
- Genus: Timocratica
- Species: T. grandis

Binomial name
- Timocratica grandis (Perty, [1833])

Synonyms
- Yponomeuta grandis Perty, [1833]

Species of moth

Timocratica grandis is a moth in the family Depressariidae. It was described by Maximilian Perty in 1833. It is found in Brazil (Amazonas), French Guiana and Panama.
