= Timocratica philomela =

Scientific classification
- Kingdom: Animalia
- Phylum: Arthropoda
- Clade: Pancrustacea
- Class: Insecta
- Order: Lepidoptera
- Family: Depressariidae
- Genus: Timocratica
- Species: T. philomela

Binomial name
- Timocratica philomela (Meyrick, 1925)

Synonyms
- Stenoma philomela Meyrick, 1925

Species of moth

Timocratica philomela is a moth of the family Depressariidae. It is found in Peru.

The wingspan is about 22 mm. The forewings are white and the hindwings are yellow-whitish grey, with the apical edge yellow. The forewings beneath are suffused light yellowish except towards the dorsum, towards the costa suffused ochreous orange, the apical edge suffused dark grey. The hindwings beneath are suffused yellowish towards the costa.
