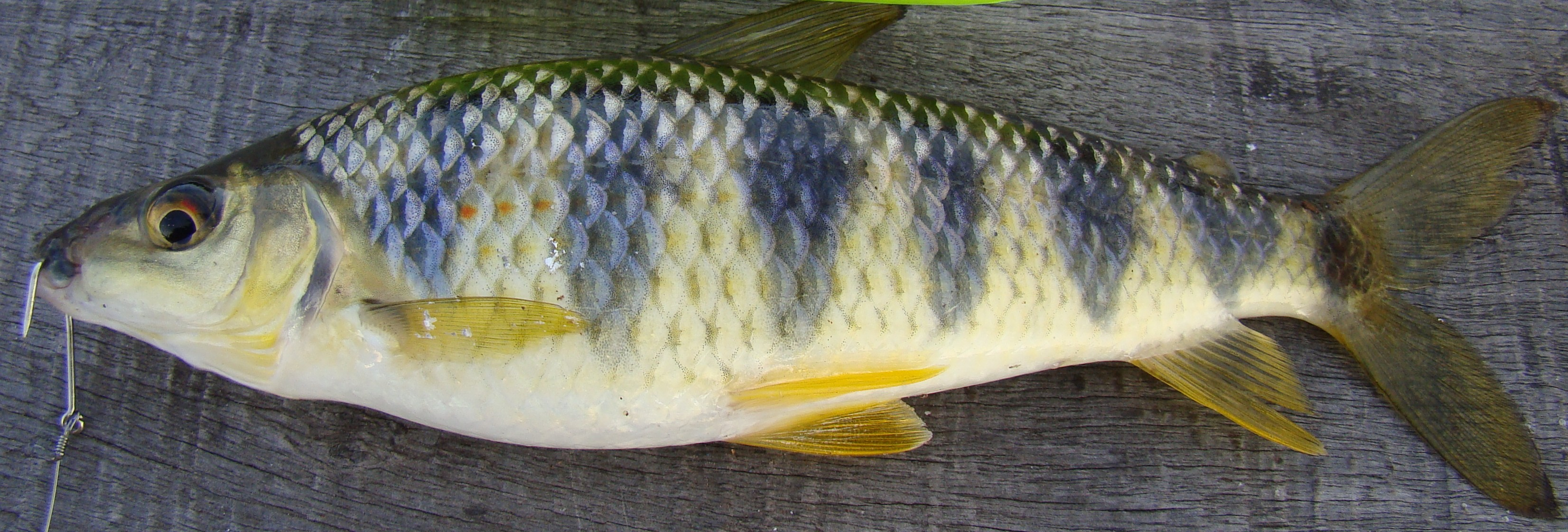

Conservation status
- Least Concern (IUCN 3.1)

Scientific classification
- Kingdom: Animalia
- Phylum: Chordata
- Class: Actinopterygii
- Division: Teleostei
- Order: Characiformes
- Family: Anostomidae
- Genus: Arrhinolemur
- Species: A. elongatus

Binomial name
- Arhinolemur elongatus (Valenciennes, 1850)

Synonyms
- Leporinus elongatus Valenciennes, 1850; Megaleporinus elongatus (Valenciennes, 1850); Leporinis crassilabbris Borodin, 1929; Leporinus crassilabris breviceps Borodin, 1929

= Arhinolemur elongatus =

Species of fish

Arhinolemur elongatus is a species of freshwater ray-finned fish belonging to the family Anostomidae, the toothed headstanders. This fish is found in Minas Gerais and Bahia states of Brazil.

== Taxonomy ==
Arhinolemur elongatus was first formally described as Leporinus elongatus in 1850 by the French zoologist Achille Valenciennes with its type locality given as the Rio São Francisco, an error, and the Río de la Plata at Buenos Aires, Argentina. It is thought that the actual type locality is the Jequitinhonha River in Brazil, a lectotype being designated in 1987. In 2017 the new genus Megaleporinus was proposed by J. L. Ramírez, J. L. O. Birindelli and P. M. Galetti Jr. with Curimatus obtusidens designated as its type species, A. elongatus is closely related to this taxon, so much that it has been regarded as a subspecies of it, and so was moved into this new genus. The genus Arhinolemur is classified within the subfamily Leporininae of the toothed headstander family, Anostomidae. Anostomidae is classified in the suborder Characoidei of the order Characiformes, the characins and related fishes.

== Etymology ==
Arhinolemur elongatus is classified within the genus Arhinolemur, a name which prefixes a-, meaning "without", to rhinos, meaning "snout", and lemur, the primate group of Madagascar. The type species of this genus A. scalabrinii was originally identified as a primate, only being identified as an anastomid fish in 2012. The specific name, elongatus, means "prolonged", a reference to the more elongated body with a relatively longer head and snout in comparison to A. pachyurus.

== Description ==
Arhinolemur elongatus has 11 or 12 soft rays in its dorsal fin and 10 or 11 in its anal fin. There are three teeth on each premaxilla and on the dentary with 12 scale rows around the caudal peduncle. This species has 36 or 27 pored scales in the lateral line, which has a number of dark blotches along its length. It has an elongated, laterally compressed boby with a maximum total length of 50 cm (20 in).

== Distribution ==
Arhinolemur elongatus is endemic to Brazil where it occurs in the drainages of the Jequitinhonha and Pardo rivers, in the states of Minas Gerais and Bahia.
