= Timocratica subovalis =

Scientific classification
- Kingdom: Animalia
- Phylum: Arthropoda
- Class: Insecta
- Order: Lepidoptera
- Family: Depressariidae
- Genus: Timocratica
- Species: T. subovalis

Binomial name
- Timocratica subovalis (Meyrick, 1932)

Synonyms
- Stenoma subovalis Meyrick, 1932; Stenoma stomatocosma Meyrick, 1932

Species of moth

Timocratica subovalis is a moth in the family Depressariidae. It was described by Edward Meyrick in 1932. It is found in Amazonas, Brazil.
