= Timocratica isarga =

Scientific classification
- Kingdom: Animalia
- Phylum: Arthropoda
- Class: Insecta
- Order: Lepidoptera
- Family: Depressariidae
- Genus: Timocratica
- Species: T. isarga

Binomial name
- Timocratica isarga (Meyrick, 1925)

Synonyms
- Stenoma isarga Meyrick, 1925

Species of moth

Timocratica isarga is a moth of the family Depressariidae. It is found in Bolivia.

The wingspan is about 40 mm. The forewings and hindwings are white, beneath also wholly white.
