= Timocratica xanthosoma =

Scientific classification
- Domain: Eukaryota
- Kingdom: Animalia
- Phylum: Arthropoda
- Class: Insecta
- Order: Lepidoptera
- Family: Depressariidae
- Genus: Timocratica
- Species: T. xanthosoma

Binomial name
- Timocratica xanthosoma (Dognin, 1913)

Synonyms
- Stenoma xanthosoma Dognin, 1913; Stenoma sacra Meyrick, 1918

Species of moth

Timocratica xanthosoma is a moth in the family Depressariidae. It was described by Paul Dognin in 1913. It is found in Panama, Colombia and French Guiana.

The wingspan is about 35 mm. The forewings are snow white and the hindwings are white.

== Subspecies ==
- Timocratica xanthosoma xanthosoma (French Guiana)
- Timocratica xanthosoma leucocephala Becker, 1982 (Panama, Colombia)
