= Timocratica albella =

Scientific classification
- Kingdom: Animalia
- Phylum: Arthropoda
- Clade: Pancrustacea
- Class: Insecta
- Order: Lepidoptera
- Family: Depressariidae
- Genus: Timocratica
- Species: T. albella

Binomial name
- Timocratica albella (Zeller, 1839)

Synonyms
- Depressaria (Volucra) albella Zeller, 1839

Species of moth

Timocratica albella is a moth in the family Depressariidae. It was described by Philipp Christoph Zeller in 1839. It is found in Suriname.

The wingspan is about 17 mm.
