= Timocratica macroleuca =

Scientific classification
- Kingdom: Animalia
- Phylum: Arthropoda
- Class: Insecta
- Order: Lepidoptera
- Family: Depressariidae
- Genus: Timocratica
- Species: T. macroleuca

Binomial name
- Timocratica macroleuca (Meyrick, 1932)

Synonyms
- Stenoma macroleuca Meyrick, 1932

Species of moth

Timocratica macroleuca is a moth in the family Depressariidae. It was described by Edward Meyrick in 1932. It is found in Bolivia.
