= Timocratica =

Scientific classification
- Kingdom: Animalia
- Phylum: Arthropoda
- Class: Insecta
- Order: Lepidoptera
- Family: Depressariidae
- Subfamily: Stenomatinae
- Genus: Timocratica; Meyrick, 1912

Synonyms
- Lychnocrates Meyrick, 1926

Genus of moths

Timocratica is a moth genus of the family Depressariidae from the Neotropics.

== Species ==
monotonia species group

- Timocratica major (Busck, 1911)
- Timocratica agramma Becker, 1982
- Timocratica longicilia Becker, 1982
- Timocratica pompeiana Meyrick, 1925
- Timocratica monotonia (Strand, 1911)
- Timocratica meridionalis Becker, 1982
- Timocratica loxotoma (Busck, 1910)
- Timocratica fraternella (Busck, 1910)

leucocapna species group

- Timocratica leucocapna (Meyrick, 1926)
- Timocratica effluxa (Meyrick, 1930)

albella species group

- Timocratica grandis (Perty, [1833])
- Timocratica bicornuta Becker, 1982
- Timocratica xanthotarsa Becker, 1982
- Timocratica constrictivalva Becker, 1982
- Timocratica subovalis (Meyrick, 1932)
- Timocratica amseli Duckworth, 1962
- Timocratica venifurcata Becker, 1982
- Timocratica fuscipalpalis Becker, 1982
- Timocratica xanthosoma (Dognin, 1913)
- Timocratica anelaea (Meyrick, 1932)
- Timocratica titanoleuca Becker, 1982
- Timocratica macroleuca (Meyrick, 1932)
- Timocratica leucorectis (Meyrick, 1925)
- Timocratica spinignatha Becker, 1982
- Timocratica argonais (Meyrick, 1925)
- Timocratica maturescens (Meyrick, 1925)
- Timocratica megaleuca (Meyrick, 1912)
- Timocratica palpalis (Zeller, 1877)
- Timocratica melanocosta Becker, 1982
- Timocratica nivea Becker, 1982
- Timocratica albitogata Becker, 1982
- Timocratica melanostriga Becker, 1982
- Timocratica isarga (Meyrick, 1925)
- Timocratica albella (Zeller, 1839)
- Timocratica guarani Becker, 1982
- Timocratica philomela (Meyrick, 1925)
- Timocratica parvileuca Becker, 1982
- Timocratica butyrota (Meyrick, 1929)
- Timocratica parvifusca Becker, 1982
