= Timocratica monotonia =

Scientific classification
- Domain: Eukaryota
- Kingdom: Animalia
- Phylum: Arthropoda
- Class: Insecta
- Order: Lepidoptera
- Family: Depressariidae
- Genus: Timocratica
- Species: T. monotonia

Binomial name
- Timocratica monotonia (Strand, 1911)

Synonyms
- Cryptolechia monotonia Strand, 1911; Timocratica isographa Meyrick, 1912; Timocratica claudescens Meyrick, 1925; Timocratica crassa Meyrick, 1925

Moth in the family Depressariidae from South America

Timocratica monotonia is a moth in the family Depressariidae. It was described by Embrik Strand in 1911. It is found in Brazil (Amazonas), Guyana, Venezuela, Colombia, Ecuador and Peru.

The wingspan is 45–56 mm. The forewings are fuscous irrorated grey whitish and with the costal edge bright orange to near the apex. There are three very indistinct brownish oblique lines from just beneath the costa, but not reaching the dorsum, the third directed towards the termen below the middle. The hindwings are ochreous yellowish, towards the base and dorsum deeper yellow.
