= Timocratica anelaea =

Scientific classification
- Kingdom: Animalia
- Phylum: Arthropoda
- Class: Insecta
- Order: Lepidoptera
- Family: Depressariidae
- Genus: Timocratica
- Species: T. anelaea

Binomial name
- Timocratica anelaea (Meyrick, 1932)

Synonyms
- Stenoma anelaea Meyrick, 1932

Species of moth

Timocratica anelaea is a moth in the family Depressariidae. It was described by Edward Meyrick in 1932. It is found in Brazil in the states of Amazonas and Pará.

The wingspan is about 54 mm. The forewings and hindwings are white. The underside of both wings is also white.
