= Timocratica parvileuca =

Scientific classification
- Domain: Eukaryota
- Kingdom: Animalia
- Phylum: Arthropoda
- Class: Insecta
- Order: Lepidoptera
- Family: Depressariidae
- Genus: Timocratica
- Species: T. parvileuca

Binomial name
- Timocratica parvileuca Becker, 1982

Species of moth

Timocratica parvileuca is a moth in the family Depressariidae. It was described by Vitor O. Becker in 1982. It is found in Brazil (São Paulo, Paraná).

The wingspan is 9–10 mm. The ground colour of the forewings is white. The underside is golden yellow. The hindwings are cream yellow.
