= Timocratica nivea =

Scientific classification
- Domain: Eukaryota
- Kingdom: Animalia
- Phylum: Arthropoda
- Class: Insecta
- Order: Lepidoptera
- Family: Depressariidae
- Genus: Timocratica
- Species: T. nivea

Binomial name
- Timocratica nivea Becker, 1982

Species of moth

Timocratica nivea is a moth in the family Depressariidae. It was described by Vitor O. Becker in 1982. It is found in Brazil (Distrito Federal, Minas Gerais).

The wingspan is 15–17 mm for males and 19–20 mm for females. The ground colour of the forewings is white. The underside is white. The hindwings are also white.
