= Timocratica leucorectis =

Scientific classification
- Kingdom: Animalia
- Phylum: Arthropoda
- Class: Insecta
- Order: Lepidoptera
- Family: Depressariidae
- Genus: Timocratica
- Species: T. leucorectis

Binomial name
- Timocratica leucorectis (Meyrick, 1925)

Synonyms
- Stenoma leucorectis Meyrick, 1925

Species of moth

Timocratica leucorectis is a moth of the family Depressariidae. It is found in Brazil (Minas Gerais, Pará, Espírito Santo), French Guiana, Colombia and Peru.

The wingspan is 56–60 mm. The forewings and hindwings are white, beneath with broad yellow-ochreous costal bands, sometimes some grey suffusion at the apex of the forewings.
