= Timocratica major =

Scientific classification
- Domain: Eukaryota
- Kingdom: Animalia
- Phylum: Arthropoda
- Class: Insecta
- Order: Lepidoptera
- Family: Depressariidae
- Genus: Timocratica
- Species: T. major

Binomial name
- Timocratica major (Busck, 1911)

Synonyms
- Stenoma major Busck, 1911

Species of moth

Timocratica major is a moth in the family Depressariidae. It was described by August Busck in 1911. It is found in Peru and Brazil (Amazonas, Mato Grosso, Goiás).

The wingspan is 50–60 mm. The forewings are light ocherous with the entire edge narrowly dark ocherous brown and with three nearly equidistant and parallel, transverse, oblique ocherous brown streaks across the wing. The first of these streaks begins at the basal third of the costa and reaches to the fold, which is itself ocherous brown. The second begins before the middle of the costa and reaches to the tornus and the third begins beyond the middle of the costa and reaches the termen. The hindwings are light yellow.
