= Agra katewinsletae =

Scientific classification
- Kingdom: Animalia
- Phylum: Arthropoda
- Clade: Pancrustacea
- Class: Insecta
- Order: Coleoptera
- Suborder: Adephaga
- Family: Carabidae
- Genus: Agra
- Species: A. katewinsletae

Binomial name
- Agra katewinsletae Erwin, 2002

Species of beetle named after Kate Winslet

Agra katewinsletae is a species of carabid beetle named after English actress Kate Winslet.

The holotype was collected in Costa Rica and first described to science in 2002. The species' discoverer, Terry Erwin, wrote:

The specific epithet, katewinsletae, is the Latinized genitive form of the combined name of the actress Kate Winslet, starlet of the movie Titanic. Her character did not go down with the ship, but we will not be able to say the same for this elegant canopy species, if all the rain forest is converted to pastures.

Agra katewinsletae is a small beetle measuring 8.5–13.0 mm (0.33–0.51 in) in length and 2.64–3.72 mm (0.104–0.146 in) in width.

== See also ==
- List of organisms named after famous people (born 1975–present)
