= Timocratica albitogata =

Scientific classification
- Kingdom: Animalia
- Phylum: Arthropoda
- Clade: Pancrustacea
- Class: Insecta
- Order: Lepidoptera
- Family: Depressariidae
- Genus: Timocratica
- Species: T. albitogata

Binomial name
- Timocratica albitogata Becker, 1982

Species of moth

Timocratica albitogata is a moth in the family Depressariidae. It was described by Vitor O. Becker in 1982. It is found in Brazil in the states of Paraná, Mato Grosso and Rio de Janeiro.
