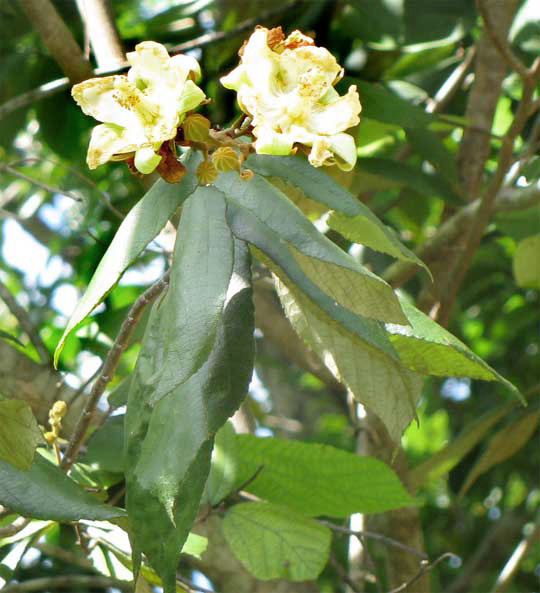
- Luehea speciosa flowering leafy branch

Scientific classification
- Kingdom: Plantae
- Clade: Embryophytes
- Clade: Tracheophytes
- Clade: Spermatophytes
- Clade: Angiosperms
- Clade: Eudicots
- Clade: Rosids
- Order: Malvales
- Family: Malvaceae
- Genus: Luehea
- Species: L. speciosa

Binomial name
- Luehea speciosa Willd.

Synonyms
- List: Aubletia ulmifolia (Kunth) F.Dietr.; Apeiba ulmifolia Kunth; Brotera maritima Vell.; Luehea alternifolia (Mill.) Mabb.; Luehea densiflora A.St.-Hil.; Luehea ferruginea Turcz.; Luehea laxiflora A.St.-Hil.; Luehea rufescens Benth.; Luehea speciosa var. laxiflora K.Schum.; Luehea tarapotina J.F.Macbr.; Cedrela alternifolia (Mill.) Steud.; Swietenia alternifolia (Mill.) Steud.; Cedrus alternifolia Mill.

= Luehea speciosa =

Species of plant

Luehea speciosa, with no commonly used English name, is an attractive tree species native mostly to tropical regions of the New World. It belongs to the family Malvaceae.

== Description ==
Here are distinctive features of Luehea speciosa:

- The tree grows up to 25 m (82 ft) with a trunk diameter at chest level of 70 cm (28 in).
- Deciduous leaves with petioles up to 12 mm (1/2 in) have egg-shaped to elliptic blades up to 24 cm (9.4 in) long and half that wide, with sharp tips and somewhat rounded bases. Blade margins are sawtoothed and both surfaces bear hairlike "star-shaped" trichomes, which grow more densely on the undersurface.
- Branched, panicle-type inflorescences up to 12 cm (4 1/2 in) appear at or near branch tips.
- Flowers on pedicels up to 3.5 cm (1 1/2 in) long bear slender sepals up to 4 cm (1 1/2 in) long and conspicuous, pale-yellow petals up to 3.5 cm (1 1/2 in) and 1.5 cm (1/2 in) wide. Many stamens group in 5 or 10 clusters, surrounding a style up to 2.5 cm (1 in) long.
- Somewhat woody, densely hairy, capsule-type fruits up to 4 cm (1 1/2 in) long and 1.5 cm (1/2 in) wide are conspicuously 5-angled with rounded ridges. Seeds are very numerous, winged, flattened and about 10 mm (3/8 in) and 4 mm (3/16 in) wide.

It can be hard to distinguish Luehea speciosa from Luehea candida, which occurs over much of the same distribution area, and in similar habitats. Leaves of Luehea speciosa tend to have their edges broadly curved downward, while leaves of L. candida are flat. Also, in Mexico's Yucatan Peninsula, Luehea speciosa flowers all year round except in August and September, while Luehea candida flowers from March to September.

== Distribution ==
Luehea speciosa occurs in southern Mexico, Cuba, all of Central America, and in South America south into Peru, Bolivia and northern Brazil.

== Habitat ==
In Mexico's Yucatan Peninsula, Luehea speciosa inhabits dry forests and moist forests, including forests regularly flooded. In Costa Rica it occurs commonly in various forest types and often is seen along roadsides.

== Human uses ==
=== In construction ===
In the Mexican state of Veracruz, the wood of Luehea speciosa is considered hard to work with, but is used in general construction, as with making furniture parts, for floors and for making plywood.

=== Ecological restoration ===
Luehea speciosa is appropriate for use in soil conservation in tropical forests experiencing extended dry seasons. Commonly it is planted in mixed tropical woodlands and agroforestry systems.

=== Miscellaneous other uses ===
Among the Mayan people of Mexico's Yucatan Peninsula it is a multi-purpose tree. Beyond uses mentioned above, its leaves are considered as forage for livestock, it is used in traditional medicine, including as an antiemetic, its flowers produce nectar and pollen for honeybees, its wood is burned as firewood and used as fenceposts, it is a valued shade tree, and resin from the tree is sought.

== Taxonomy ==
Luehea speciosa was formally named and described in 1801 by Carl Ludwig Willdenow, from a plant collected by "Herr Bredemeyer", who found the tree "... on the summit of the high mountains between Guyana and Caracas, on stony, loamy soil." The mentioned Herr Bredemeyer was Franz (Johann Christian) Bredemeyer, an Austrian botanical collector and gardener known by Willdenow, who in 1786–1788 collected plants around Caracas and the Coastal Cordillera as part of an Austrian state-sponsored expedition. Willdenow named the genus Bredemeyera after him. Thus Bredemeyer collected plants in Venezuela well before Alexander von Humboldt and Aimé Bonpland were there during their American Expedition of 1799–1804

=== Etymology ===
The genus name Luehea honors Carl Emil von der Lühe, a German poet-jurist and botanist, Danish chamberlain and bailiff, and imperial government councilor in Lower Austria.

The species name speciosa is the feminine form of the Latin adjective speciosus, meaning "beautiful" or "splendid".

== Gallery ==
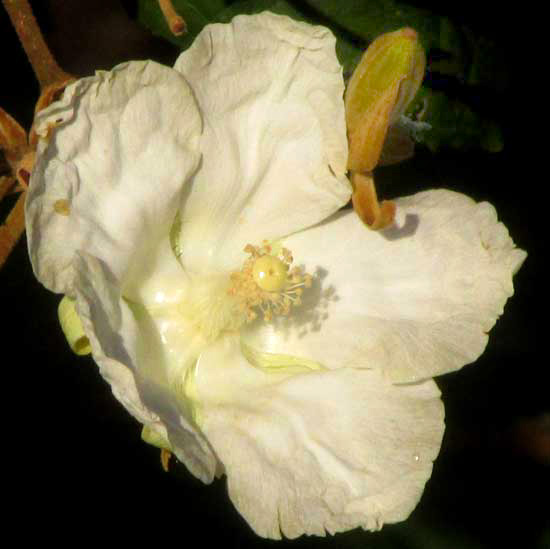
Luehea speciosa flower

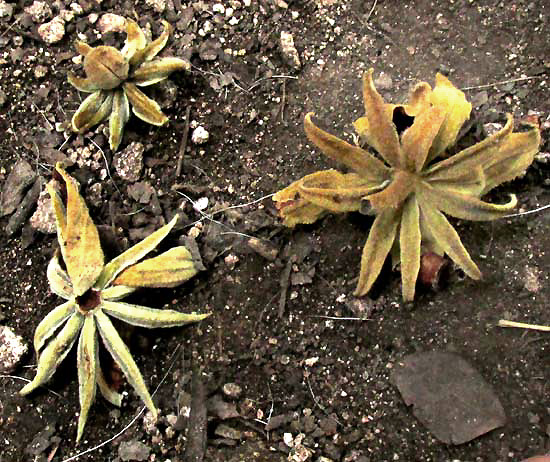
Flowers fallen onto forest trail

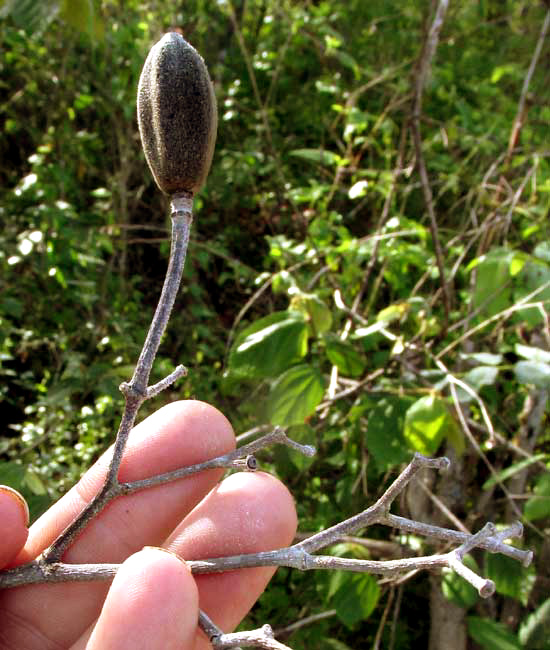
Capsular fruit before splitting open

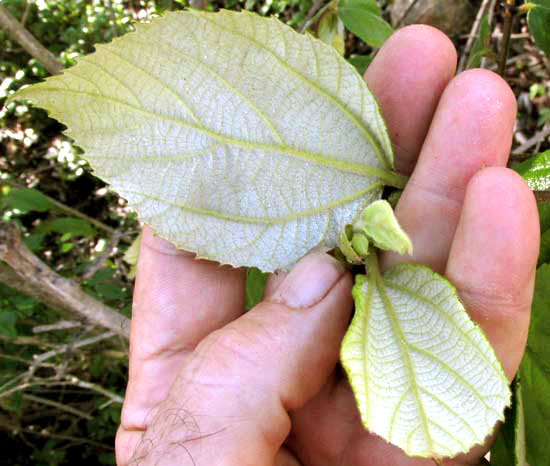
Hairy leaf undersurfaces
