= Timocratica parvifusca =

Scientific classification
- Domain: Eukaryota
- Kingdom: Animalia
- Phylum: Arthropoda
- Class: Insecta
- Order: Lepidoptera
- Family: Depressariidae
- Genus: Timocratica
- Species: T. parvifusca

Binomial name
- Timocratica parvifusca Becker, 1982

Species of moth

Timocratica parvifusca is a moth in the family Depressariidae. It was described by Vitor O. Becker in 1982. It is found in Costa Rica.

The wingspan is about 9 mm. The ground colour of the forewings is white. The underside is dark fuscous, with the costa ochreous.
