= Timocratica longicilia =

Scientific classification
- Domain: Eukaryota
- Kingdom: Animalia
- Phylum: Arthropoda
- Class: Insecta
- Order: Lepidoptera
- Family: Depressariidae
- Genus: Timocratica
- Species: T. longicilia

Binomial name
- Timocratica longicilia Becker, 1982

Species of moth

Timocratica longicilia is a moth in the family Depressariidae. It was described by Vitor O. Becker in 1982. It is found in Colombia. The habitat consists of tropical montane and tropical lower montane wet forests.
