= Dunn's road guarder =

Conservation status
- Least Concern (IUCN 3.1)

Scientific classification
- Kingdom: Animalia
- Phylum: Chordata
- Order: Squamata
- Suborder: Serpentes
- Family: Colubridae
- Genus: Crisantophis; Villa, 1971
- Species: C. nevermanni

Binomial name
- Crisantophis nevermanni (Dunn, 1937)

Synonyms
- Conophis nevermanni Dunn, 1937; Crisantophis nevermanni — Villa, 1971

Species of snake

Dunn's road guarder (Crisantophis nevermanni) is a species of snake in the subfamily Dipsadinae of the family Colubridae. The species, which is monotypic in the genus Crisantophis, is native to Central America.

== Geographic distribution ==
Crisantophis nevermanni is found in northwestern Costa Rica, El Salvador, Guatemala, western Honduras, and Nicaragua.

== Habitat ==
The preferred natural habitat of Crisantophis nevermanni is forest, at altitudes of 4–1,385 m (13–4,544 ft).

== Behavior ==
Crisantophis nevermanni is terrestrial and diurnal.

== Diet ==
Crisantophis nevermanni preys predominately upon frogs and lizards.

== Reproduction ==
Crisantophis nevermanni is oviparous.

== Etymology ==
The generic name, Crisantophis, is in honor of Miss Crisanta Cháves, who was director of the Museo Nacional de Nicaragua for over 50 years.

The specific name, nevermanni, is in honor of German coleopterist Wilhelm Heinrich Ferdinand Nevermann (1881–1938).
