= Timocratica venifurcata =

Scientific classification
- Kingdom: Animalia
- Phylum: Arthropoda
- Class: Insecta
- Order: Lepidoptera
- Family: Depressariidae
- Genus: Timocratica
- Species: T. venifurcata

Binomial name
- Timocratica venifurcata Becker, 1982

Species of moth

Timocratica venifurcata is a moth in the family Depressariidae. It was described by Vitor O. Becker in 1982. It is found in the Federal District of Brazil.

Their wingspan is 16–17 mm (0.63"–0.67") .
