= Timocratica argonais =

Scientific classification
- Kingdom: Animalia
- Phylum: Arthropoda
- Class: Insecta
- Order: Lepidoptera
- Family: Depressariidae
- Genus: Timocratica
- Species: T. argonais

Binomial name
- Timocratica argonais (Meyrick, 1925)

Synonyms
- Stenoma argonais Meyrick, 1925

Species of moth

Timocratica argonais is a moth of the family Depressariidae. It is found in Brazil (Amazonas), French Guiana and Guyana.

The wingspan is about 42 mm. The forewings and hindwings are white, beneath tinged yellowish except towards the dorsum, towards the costa and apex suffused deeper yellow ochreous and the apical edge suffused fuscous. The hindwings beneath are suffused ochreous yellowish towards the costa and apical part of the termen.
