= Timocratica guarani =

Scientific classification
- Domain: Eukaryota
- Kingdom: Animalia
- Phylum: Arthropoda
- Class: Insecta
- Order: Lepidoptera
- Family: Depressariidae
- Genus: Timocratica
- Species: T. guarani

Binomial name
- Timocratica guarani Becker, 1982

Species of moth

Timocratica guarani is a moth in the family Depressariidae. It was described by Vitor O. Becker in 1982. It is found in northern Argentina and Paraguay.

The wingspan is 12–14 mm. The ground colour of the forewings is white.
