= Timocratica megaleuca =

Scientific classification
- Kingdom: Animalia
- Phylum: Arthropoda
- Class: Insecta
- Order: Lepidoptera
- Family: Depressariidae
- Genus: Timocratica
- Species: T. megaleuca

Binomial name
- Timocratica megaleuca (Meyrick, 1912)

Synonyms
- Stenoma megaleuca Meyrick, 1912

Species of moth

Timocratica megaleuca is a moth of the family Depressariidae. It is found in Colombia.

The wingspan is about 54 mm. The forewings and hindwings are white. The forewings beneath are suffused with ochreous yellowish except towards the dorsum and termen.
