= Timocratica loxotoma =

Scientific classification
- Kingdom: Animalia
- Phylum: Arthropoda
- Clade: Pancrustacea
- Class: Insecta
- Order: Lepidoptera
- Family: Depressariidae
- Genus: Timocratica
- Species: T. loxotoma

Binomial name
- Timocratica loxotoma (Busck, 1910)

Synonyms
- Stenoma loxotoma Busck, 1910

Species of moth

Timocratica loxotoma is a moth in the family Depressariidae. It was described by August Busck in 1910. It is found in Mexico, Costa Rica and Guatemala.

The wingspan is 43–50 mm. The forewings are brownish grey with narrow ochreous edges and with three transverse, oblique, nearly parallel narrow lines. The first from the basal fourth of the costa somewhat undulated to the apical third of the dorsal edge, the second also somewhat curved from about the middle of the costa to just above the anal angle and the third is nearly straight from just before the deflection of the costal edge to the middle of termen. The hindwings are bright ochre yellow. The underside of all wings is bright ochre yellow.
