= Timocratica butyrota =

Scientific classification
- Kingdom: Animalia
- Phylum: Arthropoda
- Class: Insecta
- Order: Lepidoptera
- Family: Depressariidae
- Genus: Timocratica
- Species: T. butyrota

Binomial name
- Timocratica butyrota (Meyrick, 1929)

Synonyms
- Stenoma butyrota Meyrick, 1929; Stenoma syndicastis Meyrick, 1929

Species of moth

Timocratica butyrota is a moth in the family Depressariidae. It was described by Edward Meyrick in 1929. It is found in Colombia, Costa Rica, Panama and Peru.
