= Timocratica maturescens =

Scientific classification
- Kingdom: Animalia
- Phylum: Arthropoda
- Class: Insecta
- Order: Lepidoptera
- Family: Depressariidae
- Genus: Timocratica
- Species: T. maturescens

Binomial name
- Timocratica maturescens (Meyrick, 1925)

Synonyms
- Stenoma maturescens Meyrick, 1925

Species of moth

Timocratica maturescens is a moth of the family Depressariidae. It is found in French Guiana, Colombia and Venezuela.

The wingspan is 42–50 mm. The forewings and hindwings are white, beneath suffused light ochreous yellowish except towards the dorsum, deeper yellow ochreous towards the costa and apex, around the apical edge more or less suffused fuscous. The hindwings beneath are suffused yellow ochreous towards the costa.
