= Timocratica bicornuta =

Scientific classification
- Domain: Eukaryota
- Kingdom: Animalia
- Phylum: Arthropoda
- Class: Insecta
- Order: Lepidoptera
- Family: Depressariidae
- Genus: Timocratica
- Species: T. bicornuta

Binomial name
- Timocratica bicornuta Becker, 1982

Species of moth

Timocratica bicornuta is a moth in the family Depressariidae. It was described by Vitor O. Becker in 1982. It is found in Brazil (Rio de Janeiro) and French Guiana.
