= Halocoryza maindroni =

Scientific classification
- Kingdom: Animalia
- Phylum: Arthropoda
- Class: Insecta
- Order: Coleoptera
- Suborder: Adephaga
- Family: Carabidae
- Genus: Halocoryza
- Species: H. maindroni

Binomial name
- Halocoryza maindroni Alluaud, 1919

Species of beetle

Halocoryza maindroni is a species of brown coloured ground beetle in the subfamily Scaritinae which can be found on Comoros, Madagascar, Mauritius, Mayotte, and Réunion, as well as in Djibouti, Saudi Arabia, and Somalia.
