= Agra aculeata =

Scientific classification
- Kingdom: Animalia
- Phylum: Arthropoda
- Clade: Pancrustacea
- Class: Insecta
- Order: Coleoptera
- Suborder: Adephaga
- Family: Carabidae
- Genus: Agra
- Species: A. aculeata

Binomial name
- Agra aculeata Chaudoir, 1854

Species of beetle

Agra aculeata is a species of beetle in the family Carabidae. It is found in Colombia.
