= Agra acutidens =

Scientific classification
- Kingdom: Animalia
- Phylum: Arthropoda
- Clade: Pancrustacea
- Class: Insecta
- Order: Coleoptera
- Suborder: Adephaga
- Family: Carabidae
- Genus: Agra
- Species: A. acutidens

Binomial name
- Agra acutidens Straneo, 1965

Species of beetle

Agra acutidens is a species of beetle in the family Carabidae. It was described by Stefano Straneo in 1965.
