= Agra guatemalena =

Scientific classification
- Domain: Eukaryota
- Kingdom: Animalia
- Phylum: Arthropoda
- Class: Insecta
- Order: Coleoptera
- Suborder: Adephaga
- Family: Carabidae
- Genus: Agra
- Species: A. guatemalena

Binomial name
- Agra guatemalena Csiki, 1932

Species of beetle

Agra guatemalena is a species of carabid beetle. The holotype was collected in Costa Rica and first described to science in 1932 by Ernő Csíki.
