= Timocratica spinignatha =

Scientific classification
- Domain: Eukaryota
- Kingdom: Animalia
- Phylum: Arthropoda
- Class: Insecta
- Order: Lepidoptera
- Family: Depressariidae
- Genus: Timocratica
- Species: T. spinignatha

Binomial name
- Timocratica spinignatha Becker, 1982

Species of moth

Timocratica spinignatha is a moth in the family Depressariidae. It was described by Vitor O. Becker in 1982. It is found in Peru.
