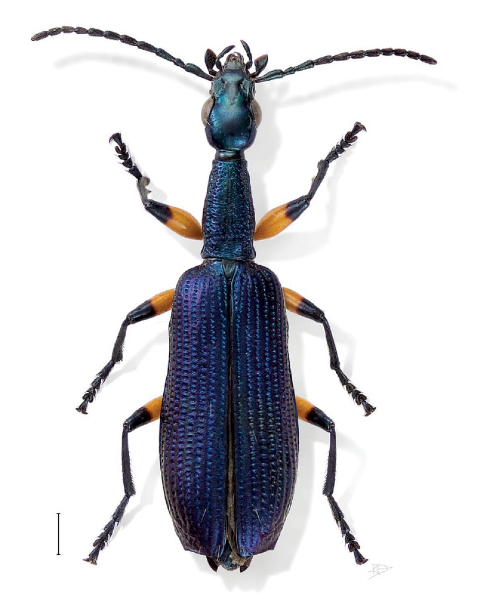
- Agra grace

Scientific classification
- Kingdom: Animalia
- Phylum: Arthropoda
- Class: Insecta
- Order: Coleoptera
- Suborder: Adephaga
- Family: Carabidae
- Tribe: Lebiini
- Genus: Agra; Fabricius, 1801

= Agra (beetle) =

Genus of beetles

Agra is a genus of beetles in the family Carabidae, the ground beetles. There are over 500 described species, but there are well over 1000 specimens in collections that have not yet been described. The common name elegant canopy beetles has been used for genus Agra.

Beetles of this genus have narrow heads and long, constricted necks. The tarsomeres, or the "feet" of the beetle, are wide and equipped with pads, allowing the beetle to grip leaves as it moves about and rests on plants. Females have "telescopic" reproductive organs, which they use to deposit eggs deep in the substrate.

Adults of some species are probably predators of other arthropods. Some have also been seen drinking sap and eating pollen. Adult beetles are nocturnal and attracted to lights. They rest on the undersides of leaves with their bodies aligned along the midrib, legs and antennae tucked in. The larvae develop in burrows and under tree bark, and are likely predatory.

Adult beetles have anti-predator secretions that are offensive to predators; they have been noted to repel bats.

Species include:

- Agra absurdis Liebke, 1938
- Agra aculeata Chaudoir, 1854
- Agra acuspina Straneo, 1979
- Agra acutidens Straneo, 1965
- Agra acutoides Straneo, 1982
- Agra aeneipennis Chaudoir, 1861
- Agra aeneola Bates, 1883
- Agra aeris Erwin, 2000
- Agra aeroides Erwin, 1983
- Agra alinahui Erwin, 2000
- Agra alternata Klug, 1834
- Agra alvarengai Straneo, 1982
- Agra amabilis Chaudoir, 1863
- Agra amoena Chaudoir, 1861
- Agra andina Liebke, 1938
- Agra andrewesi Liebke, 1938
- Agra anguinea Bates, 1865
- Agra anthrax Erwin, 1986
- Agra ardoini Straneo, 1982
- Agra ariasi Erwin, 1982
- Agra arrowi Liebke, 1938
- Agra asymetrica Straneo, 1979
- Agra aterrima Klug, 1824
- Agra atlas Erwin, 1984
- Agra atriperna Erwin, 1984
- Agra attenuata Klug, 1824
- Agra aurata Bates, 1865
- Agra aurea Liebke, 1940
- Agra aureoviridis Straneo, 1982
- Agra auricula Liebke, 1940
- Agra aurifera Liebke, 1940
- Agra auripennis Liebke, 1940
- Agra auronitens Bates, 1883
- Agra aurora Liebke, 1940
- Agra aurovittata Chaudoir, 1850
- Agra azurea Chaudoir, 1861
- Agra azureipennis Erwin, 1982
- Agra baccii (Straneo, 1958)
- Agra bahiae Straneo, 1965
- Agra baleni Steinheil, 1875
- Agra barrensis Straneo, 1955
- Agra basilewskyi Straneo, 1955
- Agra bci Erwin, 2000
- Agra belize Erwin, 1984
- Agra besckei Liebke, 1940
- Agra bicolor Straneo, 1979
- Agra bicoloripes Straneo, 1955
- Agra bicostata Bates, 1865
- Agra biexcavata Straneo, 1958
- Agra biexcisa Chaudoir, 1866
- Agra bifaria Chaudoir, 1866
- Agra biolat Erwin, 2000
- Agra biseriatella Straneo, 1955
- Agra blumax Erwin, 1983
- Agra boggianii Straneo, 1955
- Agra bogotana Straneo, 1979
- Agra boliviana Liebke, 1951
- Agra bonsi Straneo, 1979
- Agra bonvouloiri Chaudoir, 1866
- Agra borgmeieri Liebke, 1940
- Agra brentoides Latreille & Dejean, 1823
- Agra brevicollis Klug, 1824
- Agra brevicornis Bates, 1865
- Agra brevithorax Straneo, 1965
- Agra brunnea Liebke, 1940
- Agra brunneipennis Gory, 1833
- Agra brunneitarsis Straneo, 1958
- Agra brunneoviridis Straneo, 1979
- Agra brunnescens Straneo, 1965
- Agra buqueti Gory, 1833
- Agra cachimbana Straneo, 1965
- Agra cachimbo Erwin, 1984
- Agra cadabra Erwin, 1986
- Agra cajennensis (Olivier, 1795)
- Agra calamitas Erwin, 1986
- Agra caligata Liebke 1951
- Agra caligo Erwin, 1982
- Agra callidoides Straneo, 1979
- Agra campana Erwin, 1983
- Agra cancellata Dejean 1831
- Agra capitata Straneo, 1958
- Agra castanea Straneo, 1965
- Agra castaneipes Bates, 1883
- Agra castanoptera Straneo, 1965
- Agra catascopoides Straneo, 1965
- Agra catbellae Erwin, 2002
- Agra catenulata Klug, 1824
- Agra catie Erwin, 2002
- Agra cauca Erwin, 1998
- Agra cavei Erwin, 1984
- Agra ce Erwin, 2010
- Agra cephalota Liebke 1938
- Agra chalcea Klug, 1834
- Agra chalcoptera Klug, 1834
- Agra championi Bates, 1883
- Agra chapada Erwin, 1987
- Agra chaudoiri Bates, 1865
- Agra chlorocera Chaudoir, 1863
- Agra chocha Erwin, 1986
- Agra chrysis Bates, 1865
- Agra chrysopteryx Bates, 1878
- Agra cicatricosa Chaudoir, 1861
- Agra clavata Liebke, 1951
- Agra clavipes Klug, 1834
- Agra cobra Erwin, 1982
- Agra cochlearis Liebke, 1938
- Agra coeps Erwin, 1982
- Agra coerulea Chaudoir, 1854
- Agra colasi Straneo, 1965
- Agra columbiana Chaudoir, 1861
- Agra communis Straneo, 1965
- Agra confusa Chaudoir, 1854
- Agra conhormigas Erwin, 2000
- Agra conicollis Straneo, 1965
- Agra constans Erwin, 1984
- Agra coptoptera Chaudoir, 1861
- Agra cornicola Liebke, 1940
- Agra costaricensis Liebke, 1940
- Agra crassicornis Liebke, 1940
- Agra crassipes Liebke, 1951
- Agra crebrefoveata Straneo, 1965
- Agra crebrepunctata Straneo, 1955
- Agra cribriceps Straneo, 1965
- Agra cribricollis Chaudoir, 1861
- Agra cruciaria Erwin, 2010
- Agra csikii Liebke, 1940
- Agra cuneolus Erwin, 1983
- Agra cuprea Klug, 1824
- Agra cupreola Chaudoir, 1847
- Agra cupripennis Dejean, 1831
- Agra cuproptera Liebke, 1940
- Agra cyanea Chaudoir, 1861
- Agra cyanescens Lucas, 1857
- Agra cyaneucnemes Erwin, 1984
- Agra cyanippe Bates, 1891
- Agra cyanosticta Klug, 1834
- Agra cyanoviridis Straneo, 1979
- Agra cynthia Buquet, 1835
- Agra cytherea J.Thomson, 1857
- Agra dable Erwin, 2002
- Agra dafne Straneo, 1965
- Agra darlingtoni Straneo, 1955
- Agra dation Erwin, 1987
- Agra dax Erwin, 2000
- Agra delgadoi Erwin, 2002
- Agra demerasae Erwin, 1984
- Agra denticulata Steinheil 1875
- Agra dentipennis Liebke, 1951
- Agra diagonalis Straneo, 1966
- Agra dimidiata Chevrolat 1856
- Agra dominula Bates, 1865
- Agra dora Erwin, 1984
- Agra dorazul Erwin, 1984
- Agra driades Straneo, 1965
- Agra dryas Erwin, 1982
- Agra duckworlhorum Erwin, 2000
- Agra duplicata Liebke, 1938
- Agra ecaligis Erwin, 1982
- Agra ega Erwin, 1982
- Agra elaina Bates, 1883
- Agra eowilsoni Erwin, 1998
- Agra eponine Erwin, 2000
- Agra erythrocera Brulle 1837
- Agra erythropus Dejean 1825
- Agra eucera Erwin, 1984
- Agra eucnemes Erwin, 1984
- Agra eurypelma Bates, 1883
- Agra exarata Klug, 1824
- Agra excavata Klug, 1824
- Agra exsculpta Liebke, 1951
- Agra fada Chevrolat 1856
- Agra falcon Erwin, 2000
- Agra fallax Liebke, 1951
- Agra falsisagax Erwin, 1982
- Agra famula Liebke, 1940
- Agra feisthameli Buquet, 1835
- Agra felix Liebke, 1951
- Agra femoralis Chaudoir, 1861
- Agra femorata Klug, 1824
- Agra filicornis Straneo, 1955
- Agra filiformis Dejean, 1831
- Agra fimbriata Straneo, 1965
- Agra flava Straneo, 1966
- Agra flavipes Straneo, 1982
- Agra foraminosa Liebke, 1938
- Agra forluna Erwin, 1983
- Agra formicaria Thomson, 1857
- Agra foveella Liebke, 1937
- Agra foveigera Chaudoir, 1861
- Agra foveipennis Chaudoir, 1866
- Agra foveolata Chaudoir, 1850
- Agra fryi Chaudoir, 1866
- Agra fugax Erwin, 2002
- Agra fulvicauda Bates, 1883
- Agra funebris Straneo, 1965
- Agra fuseipes Straneo, 1979
- Agra gaudiola Bates, 1865
- Agra gemmata Klug, 1824
- Agra geniculata Klug, 1824
- Agra geographiea Straneo, 1965
- Agra germaini Liebke, 1938
- Agra giesberti Erwin, 2002
- Agra glauca Liebke, 1951
- Agra goryi Chaudoir, 1847
- Agra gounellei Liebke, 1938
- Agra goyasensis Straneo, 1965
- Agra goyazella Erwin, 1984
- Agra grace Erwin, 2010
- Agra gracilis Lucas 1857
- Agra graminea Bates, 1865
- Agra granodeoro Erwin, 2002
- Agra gravis Straneo, 1966
- Agra guatemalena Csiki, 1932
- Agra guyanensis (Chaudoir, 1863)
- Agra hespenheide Erwin, 2000
- Agra hilaris Liebke, 1938
- Agra hirta Straneo, 1965
- Agra honesta Chaudoir, 1854
- Agra hovorei Erwin, 2000
- Agra howdenorum Erwin, 1982
- Agra huambana Straneo, 1982
- Agra humboldti Liebke, 1951
- Agra humeralis Straneo, 1966
- Agra hyalina Chaudoir, 1861
- Agra hypsophila Straneo, 1966
- Agra ichabod Erwin, 2002
- Agra ictina Bates, 1883
- Agra ignobilis Chaudoir, 1872
- Agra imaginis Erwin, 1986
- Agra immersa Klug, 1824
- Agra inbio Erwin, 2000
- Agra inca Erwin, 1986
- Agra incerta Straneo, 1979
- Agra incisa Liebke, 1938
- Agra infuscata Klug, 1824
- Agra inops Straneo, 1979
- Agra inpa Erwin, 1983
- Agra insidiosa Bates, 1883
- Agra intermedia Straneo, 1958
- Agra invicta Erwin, 1982
- Agra iota Erwin, 1984
- Agra iquitosana Erwin, 1982
- Agra iris Liebke, 1938
- Agra itatiaya Erwin, 1986
- Agra iycisca Buquet 1835
- Agra janzeni Erwin, 2002
- Agra jedlickai Liebke, 1938
- Agra jimwappes Erwin, 2002
- Agra julie Erwin, 2002
- Agra katewinsletae Erwin, 2002
- Agra kayae Erwin, 1984
- Agra ketschuana Liebke, 1951
- Agra klugii Brulle, 1837
- Agra lacrymosa Straneo, 1965
- Agra laeticolor Bates, 1878
- Agra laetipes Straneo, 1965
- Agra lamproptera Chaudoir, 1847
- Agra lata Erwin, 1987
- Agra laticeps Bates, 1865
- Agra latifemoris Straneo, 1982
- Agra latipes Chaudoir, 1861
- Agra lavernae Erwin, 1978
- Agra leprieuri Buquet 1835
- Agra liebkei Straneo, 1958
- Agra ligulata Liebke, 1940
- Agra lilu Erwin, 2000
- Agra limulus Erwin, 1982
- Agra lindae Erwin, 2000
- Agra littleorum Erwin, 1984
- Agra liv Erwin, 2002
- Agra lobata Straneo, 1982
- Agra longelytrata Straneo, 1965
- Agra longicornis Liebke 1938
- Agra longula Chaudoir, 1866
- Agra loricata Liebke 1940
- Agra luctuosa Straneo, 1979
- Agra luehea Erwin, 1983
- Agra lugubris Straneo, 1979
- Agra lutea Liebke 1938
- Agra macra Steinheil 1875
- Agra macracantha Bates, 1883
- Agra macrodera Chaudoir, 1866
- Agra magdalena Erwin, 1987
- Agra magnifica Erwin, 2000
- Agra maia Erwin, 2010
- Agra manu Erwin, 2000
- Agra maracay Erwin, 2000
- Agra mathani Straneo, 1965
- Agra mauritii Straneo, 1982
- Agra max Erwin, 2010
- Agra maxli Erwin, 1982
- Agra maya Liebke 1951
- Agra megaera J. Thomson 1857
- Agra melanogqna Chaudoir, 1861
- Agra memnon Erwin, 1987
- Agra metallescens Chaudoir, 1847
- Agra mexicana Buquet 1835
- Agra mime Erwin, 2000
- Agra minasianus Erwin, 2010
- Agra mira Liebke 1938
- Agra mirabilis Straneo, 1966
- Agra misella Straneo, 1965
- Agra mixta Straneo, 1965
- Agra mnemosine Straneo, 1965
- Agra mniszechi Erwin, 1982
- Agra modesta Straneo, 1979
- Agra moerens Chaudoir, 1861
- Agra moesta Chaudoir, 1861
- Agra moira Erwin, 1983
- Agra monteverde Erwin, 2002
- Agra monticola Liebke, 1938
- Agra moritzi Chaudoir, 1861
- Agra muehlei Straneo, 1982
- Agra mulieris Liebke 1951
- Agra multifoveolata Steinheil, 1875
- Agra multiplicata Klug, 1824
- Agra multipunctata Straneo, 1965
- Agra multisetosa Bates, 1883
- Agra mustela Bates, 1865
- Agra negrei Straneo, 1966
- Agra nevermanni Liebke, 1938
- Agra nex Erwin, 2000
- Agra nicki Schweiger, 1952
- Agra nickiana Straneo, 1955
- Agra nigra Liebke, 1951
- Agra nigrarima Erwin, 1984
- Agra nigrella Straneo, 1965
- Agra nigripes Chaudoir, 1847
- Agra nigritarsis Straneo, 1982
- Agra nigritula Straneo, 1955
- Agra nigriventris Chaudoir, 1861
- Agra nigroaenea Chaudoir, 1854
- Agra nigrocyanea Straneo, 1955
- Agra nigrotibiata Straneo, 1965
- Agra nigroviridis Straneo, 1982
- Agra nodicornis Straneo, 1965
- Agra nola Erwin, 1986
- Agra not Erwin, 2002
- Agra notcatie Erwin, 2002
- Agra notichlora Erwin, 1984
- Agra notiocyanea Erwin, 1984
- Agra notpusilla Erwin, 2010
- Agra nova Straneo, 1982
- Agra novoaurora Erwin, 2000
- Agra nox Erwin, 1984
- Agra oblongopunctata Chevrolat 1835
- Agra obscura Chaudoir, 1861
- Agra obscuripes Chaudoir, 1854
- Agra obscuritibiis Straneo, 1965
- Agra occipitalis Bates, 1865
- Agra ocellata Liebke, 1938
- Agra ohausi Liebke, 1938
- Agra oiapoquensis Erwin, 1982
- Agra olfersi Straneo, 1966
- Agra olivella Bates, 1883
- Agra olivencana Erwin, 1982
- Agra optima Bates, 1865
- Agra orabrocha Erwin, 1984
- Agra orinocensis Erwin, 2000
- Agra osculatii Guerin-Meneville, 1855
- Agra othello Erwin, 2000
- Agra ovicollis Chaudoir, 1861
- Agra oxyptera Chaudoir, 1861
- Agra pacifica Bates, 1891
- Agra pala Liebke, 1937
- Agra pallens Lucas 1857
- Agra pallida Liebke, 1937
- Agra pallipes Liebke, 1938
- Agra palmata Steinheil, 1875
- Agra paloma Erwin, 1984
- Agra panamensis Bates, 1878
- Agra para Erwin, 1987
- Agra paradoxa Straneo, 1979
- Agra paratax Erwin, 2000
- Agra parumfoveata Straneo, 1965
- Agra pavonina Straneo, 1965
- Agra pearsoni Erwin, 1984
- Agra peccata Liebke, 1940
- Agra pehlkei Liebke, 1938
- Agra pennyi Erwin, 1982
- Agra perexcisa Straneo, 1965
- Agra perforata Liebke, 1938
- Agra perinvicta Erwin, 1982
- Agra perkinsorum Erwin, 1986
- Agra perrinae Straneo, 1982
- Agra pertzeli Liebke, 1951
- Agra peruana Liebke, 1951
- Agra phaearlhra Chaudoir, 1866
- Agra phaenicodera (Bates, 1865)
- Agra phaenoptera Chaudoir, 1854
- Agra phaeogena Bates, 1865
- Agra phainops Erwin, 1986
- Agra phallica Erwin, 2002
- Agra phite Erwin, 1987
- Agra pia Liebke, 1940
- Agra pichincha Erwin, 2000
- Agra picipes Klug, 1834
- Agra piligera Straneo, 1982
- Agra piranha Erwin, 2010
- Agra pitilla Erwin, 2002
- Agra plantipedis Liebke, 1951
- Agra platyscelis (Chaudoir, 1861)
- Agra plaumanni Liebke, 1940
- Agra plebeja Chaudoir, 1872
- Agra polita Lucas 1857
- Agra prasina Liebke, 1940
- Agra prodigiosa Liebke, 1938
- Agra proxima Straneo, 1982
- Agra pseuderythropus Erwin, 1982
- Agra pseudoboliviana Straneo, 1965
- Agra pseudolaetipes Straneo, 1979
- Agra pseudolutea Straneo, 1982
- Agra pseudomoesta Straneo, 1965
- Agra pseudopusilla Erwin, 2010
- Agra pseudorufitarsis Straneo, 1965
- Agra pseudovarians Straneo, 1965
- Agra pujoli Straneo, 1965
- Agra pulchella Chaudoir, 1861
- Agra pulchra Straneo, 1982
- Agra pulla Chaudoir, 1866
- Agra punctata Straneo, 1955
- Agra punctatella Straneo, 1958
- Agra punctatostriata Chaudoir, 1861
- Agra puncticeps Straneo, 1982
- Agra puncticollis Dejean, 1825
- Agra punctigera Straneo, 1958
- Agra punctulata Liebke, 1951
- Agra pupilla Liebke, 1940
- Agra purpurea Bates, 1883
- Agra quadricephala Straneo, 1955
- Agra quadrilamata Straneo, 1965
- Agra quadriseriata Lansberge, 1866
- Agra quadrispinosa Chaudoir, 1872
- Agra quararibea Erwin, 1993
- Agra quesada Erwin, 2002
- Agra raffaellae Straneo, 1982
- Agra reflexidens Chaudoir, 1861
- Agra regina Liebke 1951
- Agra regularis Klug, 1834
- Agra relucens Schweiger 1952
- Agra resplendens Chaudoir, 1866
- Agra rhomboides Erwin, 1982
- Agra risseri Erwin, 2010
- Agra rondonia Erwin, 2000
- Agra rosea Liebke, 1940
- Agra rosettae Straneo, 1960
- Agra rotundangula Straneo, 1955
- Agra rubra Erwin, 1987
- Agra rubricephala (Straneo, 1982)
- Agra rubricollis (Chaudoir, 1863)
- Agra rubripes Straneo, 1955
- Agra rubrocuprea Bates, 1865
- Agra rubrofemorata Straneo, 1958
- Agra rubroviolacea Straneo, 1965
- Agra rufarima Erwin, 1984
- Agra rufescens Klug, 1824
- Agra ruficornis Klug, 1824
- Agra rufipes Fabrlcius, 1801
- Agra rufitarsis Straneo, 1955
- Agra rufiventris Bates, 1883
- Agra rufoaenea Chevrolat, 1835
- Agra rufonigra Straneo, 1965
- Agra rugosostriata Chaudoir, 1854
- Agra rutilipennis Laporte De Castelnau, 1835
- Agra sagax Liebke, 1940
- Agra sahlbergii Chaudoir, 1854
- Agra saltatrix Erwin, 1982
- Agra samiria Erwin, 2000
- Agra santarema Chaudoir, 1866
- Agra santarosa Erwin, 2002
- Agra saramax Erwin, 1993
- Agra sasquatch Erwin, 1982
- Agra satipo Erwin, 1984
- Agra saundersi Bates, 1865
- Agra schwarzeneggeri Erwin, 2002
- Agra scrobipennis Chaudoir, 1863
- Agra seabrae Erwin, 1982
- Agra semifulva Bates, 1883
- Agra semiviridis (Straneo, 1968)
- Agra seriefoveata Chaudoir, 1877
- Agra serra Erwin, 1984
- Agra servatorum Erwin, 2000
- Agra seticollis Straneo, 1982
- Agra setifemoris Straneo, 1982
- Agra setigera Liebke, 1938
- Agra sexdentata Straneo, 1982
- Agra sigillata Liebke, 1940
- Agra similis Schweiger, 1952
- Agra simillima Straneo, 1965
- Agra simplex Liebke, 1940
- Agra sirena Erwin, 2002
- Agra sironyx Erwin, 1984
- Agra smaragdina Chaudoir, 1866
- Agra smaragdinipennis (Steinheil, 1875)
- Agra smaragdula Liebke, 1938
- Agra smurf Erwin, 2000
- Agra soccata Bates, 1883
- Agra solanoi Erwin, 2002
- Agra solimoes Erwin, 2000
- Agra solisi Erwin, 2002
- Agra soror Chaudoir, 1866
- Agra sparsepunctata Straneo, 1982
- Agra sphenarion Erwin, 1982
- Agra spina Erwin, 1983
- Agra spinicauda Straneo, 1982
- Agra spinipennis Chaudoir, 1850
- Agra spinosa Liebke, 1940
- Agra splendida Dejean 1829
- Agra steinbachi Liebke, 1951
- Agra sternitica Straneo, 1982
- Agra stockwelli Erwin, 1984
- Agra strandi Liebke, 1940
- Agra strangulata Chaudoir, 1863
- Agra striatifemoris Liebke, 1940
- Agra striatopunctata Chaudoir, 1866
- Agra subcoerulea Straneo, 1965
- Agra subgemmata Straneo, 1965
- Agra sublaevicollis Straneo, 1965
- Agra sublaevigata Straneo, 1965
- Agra subpallipes Straneo, 1982
- Agra subtilicornis Straneo, 1982
- Agra subtilis Straneo, 1982
- Agra superba Erwin, 2000
- Agra suprema Erwin, 2000
- Agra surinama Csiki, 1932
- Agra suturalis Lucas, 1857
- Agra tarapoto Erwin, 1984
- Agra tarapotoana Erwin, 1982
- Agra tarnieri Chaudoir, 1861
- Agra tenuis Chaudoir, 1863
- Agra terebrata Straneo, 1966
- Agra tessera Erwin, 1983
- Agra tetraspina Straneo, 1982
- Agra thiemei Liebke, 1940
- Agra thomsoni Liebke, 1940
- Agra tibialis Chaudoir, 1861
- Agra tingo Erwin, 2000
- Agra tingomaria Erwin, 1984
- Agra tiputini Erwin, 2010
- Agra titan Erwin, 1982
- Agra titschacki Liebke, 1951
- Agra tremolerasi Liebke, 1940
- Agra tricarinata Straneo, 1965
- Agra tricolor Liebke, 1940
- Agra tricuspidata Straneo, 1979
- Agra tridentata (Olivier, 1795)
- Agra triseriata Chaudoir, 1861
- Agra tristis Dejean 1831
- Agra trochanterica Straneo, 1965
- Agra truquii Chaudoir, 1866
- Agra tubercolata Straneo, 1965
- Agra tuitis Erwin, 1987
- Agra tumatumari Erwin, 1982
- Agra turrialba Erwin, 2002
- Agra tuxtlas Erwin, 2000
- Agra ubicki Erwin, 2002
- Agra urania Straneo, 1965
- Agra valentina Bates, 1865
- Agra vanemdeni Straneo, 1955
- Agra varceicola Erwin, 1982
- Agra variabilis Straneo, 1982
- Agra varians Chaudoir, 1861
- Agra variipes Liebke, 1951
- Agra varioligera Chaudoir, 1863
- Agra variolosa Klug, 1824
- Agra vate Erwin, 1986
- Agra vation Erwin, 1983
- Agra venatrix Liebke, 1951
- Agra venezuelana Straneo, 1982
- Agra venustula Straneo, 1958
- Agra vesedes Erwin, 1984
- Agra vicina Chaudoir, 1847
- Agra vidua Straneo, 1965
- Agra violacea Straneo, 1966
- Agra violante Liebke, 1940
- Agra virgata Chevrolat, 1856
- Agra viridicollis Straneo, 1965
- Agra viridipennis Straneo, 1958
- Agra viridipleuris Straneo, 1965
- Agra viridipunctata Chaudoir, 1854
- Agra viridisticta Chaudoir, 1861
- Agra viridistriata Schweiger 1952
- Agra viridula Straneo, 1965
- Agra vulgaris Straneo, 1965
- Agra winnie Erwin, 2002
- Agra xingu Erwin, 1984
- Agra yeti Erwin, 1982
- Agra yoda Erwin, 1982
- Agra yodella Erwin, 1982
- Agra yola Erwin, 2000
- Agra zapotal Erwin, 2000
- Agra zellibori Straneo, 1966
- Agra zischkai Straneo, 1955
- Agra zona Erwin, 1983
- Agra zumbado Erwin, 2002
- Agra zuniga Erwin, 2002
