= Timocratica melanocosta =

Scientific classification
- Domain: Eukaryota
- Kingdom: Animalia
- Phylum: Arthropoda
- Class: Insecta
- Order: Lepidoptera
- Family: Depressariidae
- Genus: Timocratica
- Species: T. melanocosta

Binomial name
- Timocratica melanocosta Becker, 1982

Species of moth

Timocratica melanocosta is a moth in the family Depressariidae. It was described by Vitor O. Becker in 1982. It is found in Panama.

The wingspan is 14–18 mm for males and 16–19 mm for females. The ground colour of the forewings is white. The underside is white. The hindwings are also white.

The larvae feed on the bark of Erythroxylym suberosum and Byrsonima species.
