= Timocratica meridionalis =

Scientific classification
- Kingdom: Animalia
- Phylum: Arthropoda
- Class: Insecta
- Order: Lepidoptera
- Family: Depressariidae
- Genus: Timocratica
- Species: T. meridionalis

Binomial name
- Timocratica meridionalis Becker, 1982

Species of moth

Timocratica meridionalis is a moth in the family Depressariidae. It was described by Vitor O. Becker in 1982. It is found in Brazil (Paraná, São Paulo, Rio Grande do Sul), Bolivia and Paraguay.
