= Halocoryza arenaria =

Scientific classification
- Kingdom: Animalia
- Phylum: Arthropoda
- Class: Insecta
- Order: Coleoptera
- Suborder: Adephaga
- Family: Carabidae
- Genus: Halocoryza
- Species: H. arenaria

Binomial name
- Halocoryza arenaria Darlington, 1939

Species of beetle

Halocoryza arenaria is a species of brown coloured ground beetle in the subfamily Scaritinae which was described by Darlington in 1939.

== Distribution ==
It is found on Barbados, Dominican Republic, Grenada, Guadeloupe, Jamaica, Puerto Rico, Virgin Islands, as well as Brazil, and Panama. It is also native to Cameroon. and was recorded from Florida, United States and East coast of Mexico such as Quintana Roo, Puerto Juarez, and Yucatan Peninsula.
