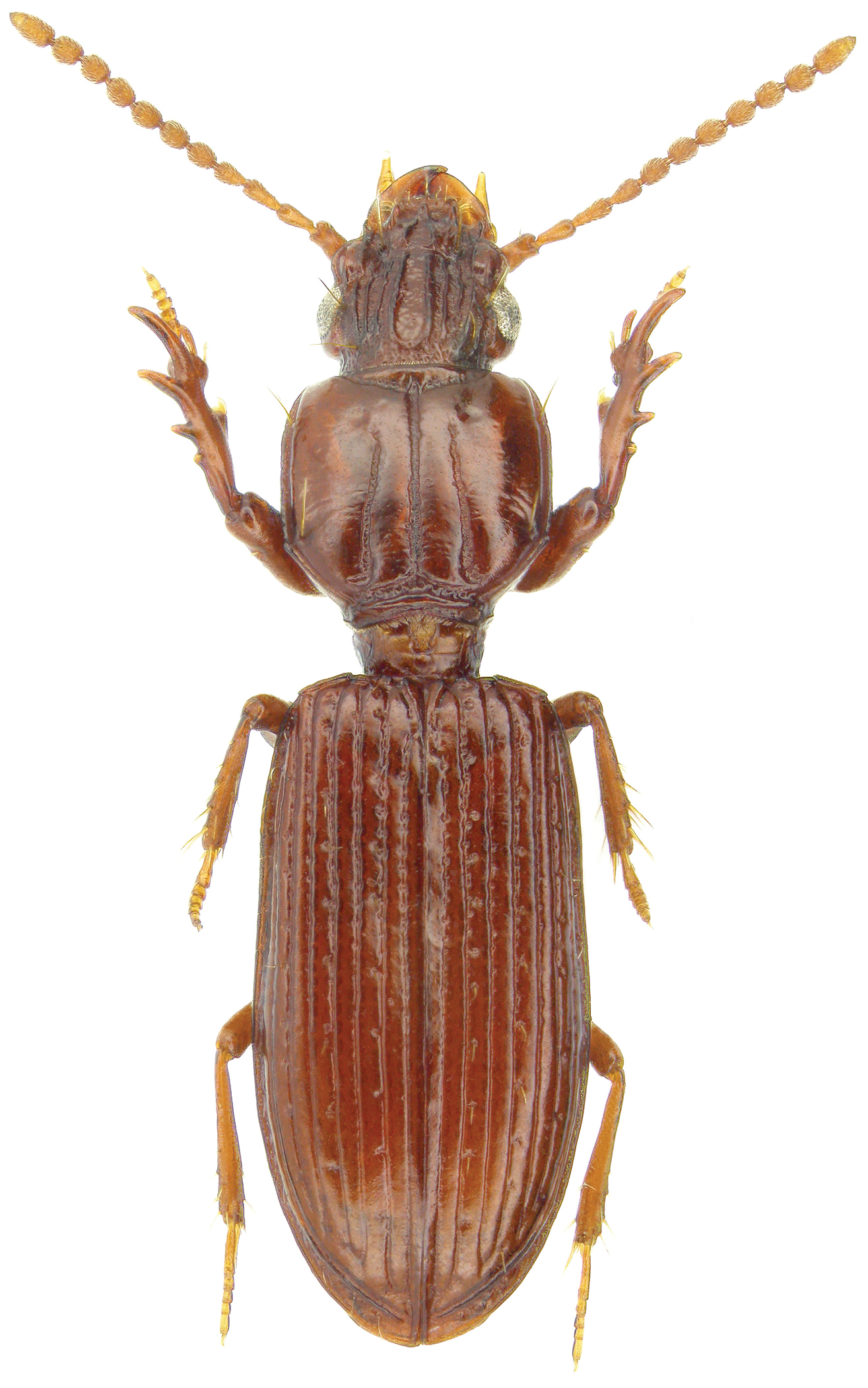

Scientific classification
- Domain: Eukaryota
- Kingdom: Animalia
- Phylum: Arthropoda
- Class: Insecta
- Order: Coleoptera
- Suborder: Adephaga
- Family: Carabidae
- Genus: Schizogenius
- Species: S. amphibius

Binomial name
- Schizogenius amphibius (Haldeman, 1843)

= Schizogenius amphibius =

Species of beetle

Schizogenius amphibius is a species of ground beetle in the family Carabidae. It is found in North America.
