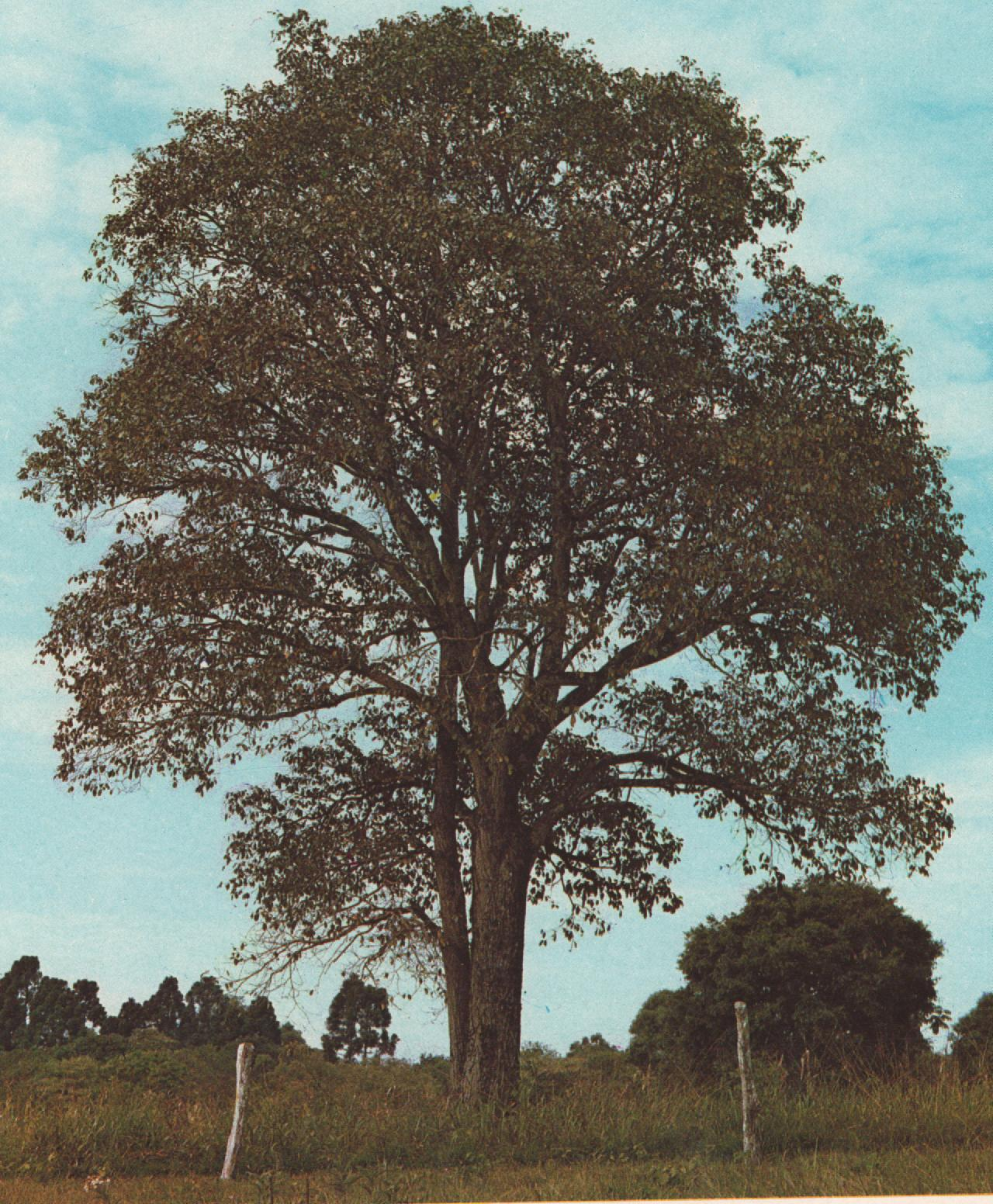
- Luehea divaricata

Scientific classification
- Kingdom: Plantae
- Clade: Tracheophytes
- Clade: Angiosperms
- Clade: Eudicots
- Clade: Rosids
- Order: Malvales
- Family: Malvaceae
- Subfamily: Grewioideae
- Genus: Luehea; Willd.

Synonyms
- Alegria Moc. & Sessé ex DC.; Brotera Vell.; Luhea DC.

= Luehea =

Genus of trees

Luehea is a genus of trees in the family Malvaceae.

Its native range stretches from Mexico to southern tropical America and Cuba. It is native to the countries of; Argentina, Belize, Bolivia, Brazil, Colombia, Costa Rica, Cuba, Ecuador, El Salvador, French Guiana, Guatemala, Guyana, Honduras, Mexico, Nicaragua, Panamá, Paraguay, Peru, Suriname, Uruguay, and Venezuela. It has been introduced into; Bangladesh, the Dominican Republic, and Puerto Rico.

The genus name of Luehea is in honour of Carl Emil von der Luehe or Lühe (1751–1801), a German botanist and chamberlain of Princess Caroline-Mathilde of Denmark; later a chamberlain in Vienna, Austria. It was first described and published by Carl Ludwig Willdenow in Neue Schriften Ges. Naturf. Freunde Berlin Vol.3 on page 410 in 1801.

== Known species ==
19 species are accepted.

- Luehea burretii M.C.S.Cunha
- Luehea candicans Mart.
- Luehea candida (Moc. & Sessé ex DC.) Mart.
- Luehea conwentzii K.Schum.
- Luehea cymulosa Spruce ex Benth.
- Luehea divaricata Mart.
- Luehea fiebrigii Burret
- Luehea grandiflora Mart.
- Luehea herzogiana R.E.Fr.
- Luehea macrophylla Pohl
- Luehea microcarpa R.E.Fr.
- Luehea ochrophylla Mart.
- Luehea paniculata Mart.
- Luehea rufescens A.St.-Hil.
- Luehea seemannii Triana & Planch.
- Luehea speciosa Willd.
- Luehea splendens Rusby
- Luehea steinbachii Burret
- Luehea tomentella Rusby

The type species is Luehea speciosa.

According to the IUCN Red List of plants; Luehea candicans, Luehea candida, Luehea speciosa, Luehea cymulosa, Luehea divaricata, Luehea paniculata, Luehea ochrophylla and Luehea seemannii are all listed as Least concern plants.
