= Schizogenius sulcifrons =

Scientific classification
- Domain: Eukaryota
- Kingdom: Animalia
- Phylum: Arthropoda
- Class: Insecta
- Order: Coleoptera
- Suborder: Adephaga
- Family: Carabidae
- Genus: Schizogenius
- Species: S. sulcifrons

Binomial name
- Schizogenius sulcifrons Putzeys, 1846

Species of beetle

Schizogenius sulcifrons is a species of ground beetle in the family Carabidae. It is found in North America.
