= Timocratica fuscipalpalis =

Scientific classification
- Domain: Eukaryota
- Kingdom: Animalia
- Phylum: Arthropoda
- Class: Insecta
- Order: Lepidoptera
- Family: Depressariidae
- Genus: Timocratica
- Species: T. fuscipalpalis

Binomial name
- Timocratica fuscipalpalis Becker, 1982

Species of moth

Timocratica fuscipalpalis is a moth in the family Depressariidae. It was described by Vitor O. Becker in 1982. It is found in Venezuela.

The wingspan is about 12 mm. The ground colour of the forewings is white. The costa on the underside is golden yellow. The hindwings are white.
