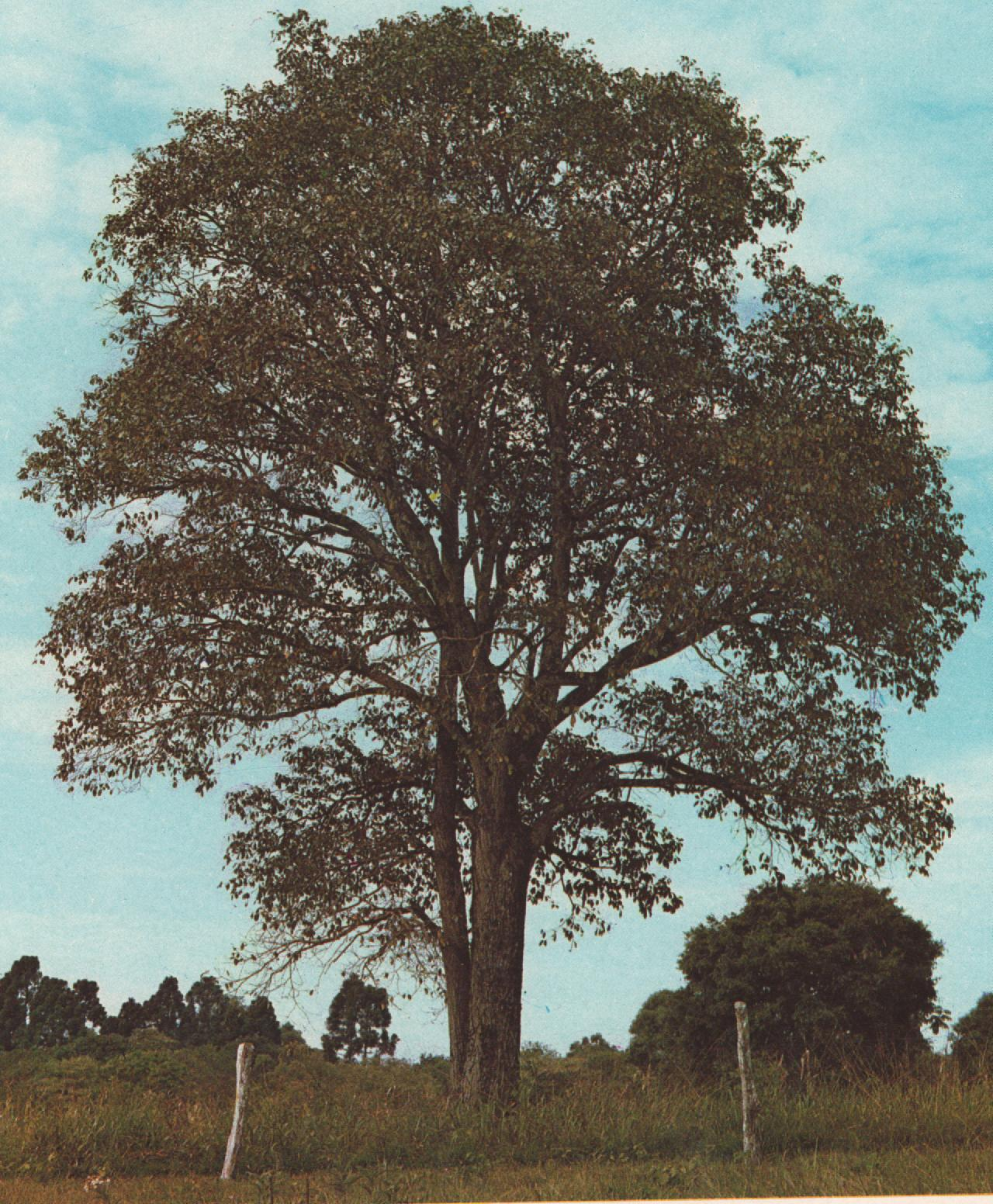

Scientific classification
- Kingdom: Plantae
- Clade: Tracheophytes
- Clade: Angiosperms
- Clade: Eudicots
- Clade: Rosids
- Order: Malvales
- Family: Malvaceae
- Genus: Luehea
- Species: L. divaricata

Binomial name
- Luehea divaricata Mart

Synonyms
- Alegria divaricata; Brotera mediterranea; Thespesia brasiliensis

= Luehea divaricata =

Species of tree

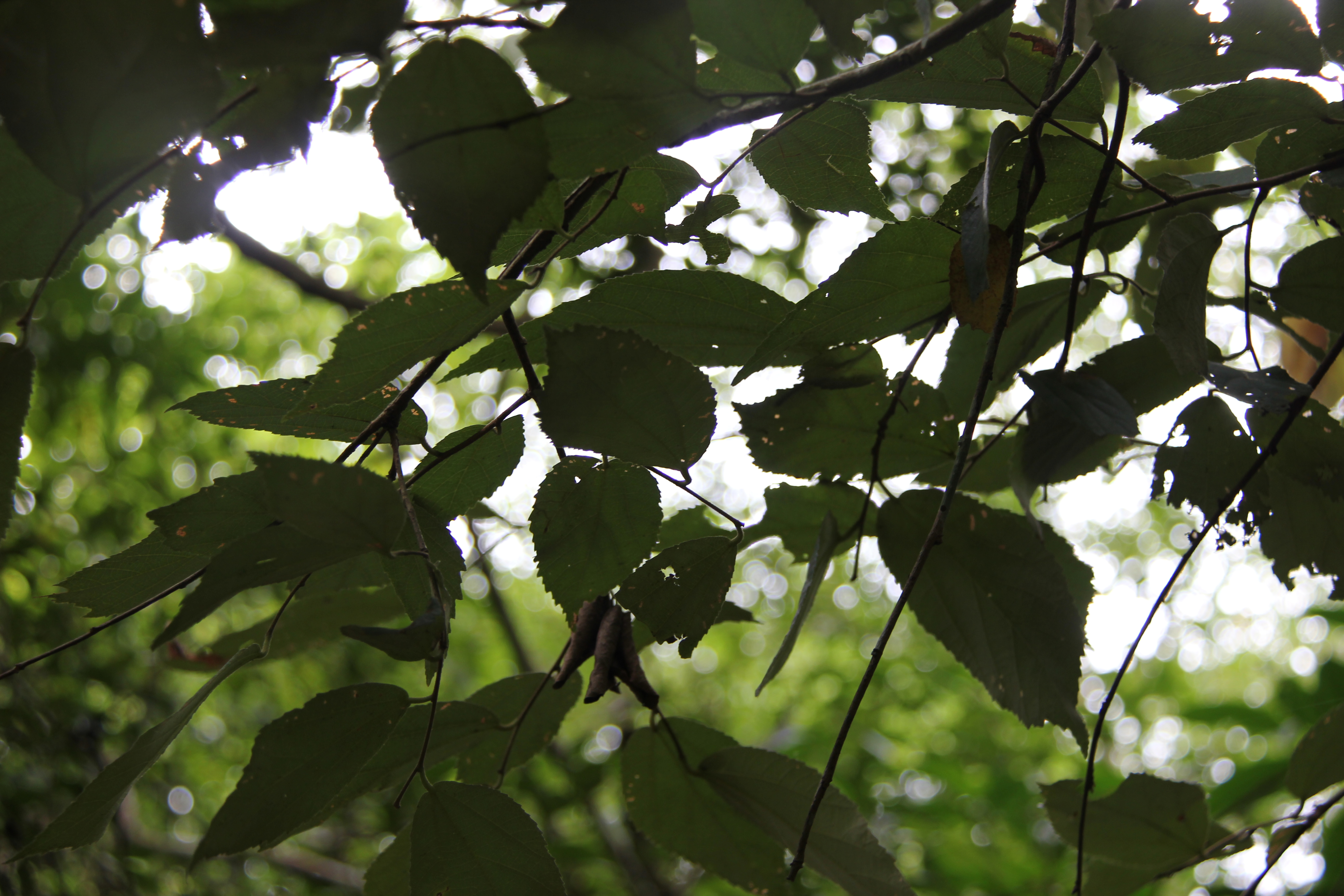
Luehea divaricata leaves, Iguazu Falls, Argentina

Luehea divaricata is a species of tree native to the cerrado area of Brazil, particularly the states of Bahia and Rio Grande do Sul. It is known by various local names including "açoita-cavalo", "açoita-cavalo miúdo", "ibatingui", "ivatingui", "pau-de-canga", and "caiboti".

== Traditional uses ==
Luehea divaricata is regarded as a medicinal plant in traditional Brazilian medicine. The stems are used to relieve inflammation, the leaves are used as a diuretic while a bark decoction is used in the treatment of arthritis. The wood can also be fashioned into whips.
