= Wilhelm Heinrich Ferdinand Nevermann =

German entomologist (1881–1938)

- Born: 31 October 1881; Hamburg, Germany
- Died: 3 July 1938 (aged 56); Limón, Costa Rica
- Scientific career
- Fields: Entomology

Wilhelm Heinrich Ferdinand Nevermann, more usually known as Ferdinand Nevermann (31 October 1881 – 3 July 1938) was a German entomologist who specialised in Coleoptera.

== Biography ==
Nevermann was born in Hamburg on 31 October 1881. His parents were Johann Joachim Heinrich Nevermann and Johanna Henriette Nevermann [née Meier].

Nevermann spent much of his working life in Costa Rica, where he was a resident from about 1909. He owned a banana plantation called the Hamburg Farm near the Reventazón River at Ebene, Limón (near the modern town of Cairo), and was a professor at the National School of Agriculture.

Nevermann married Annie Rownd Deters (1888–1984) in 1909, and they had four children.

The Dunn's road guarder snake, Crisantophis nevermanni (Dunn, 1937), was given its specific name by American herpetologist Emmett Reid Dunn (1894–1956) in honour of Nevermann.

In June 1938 Nevermann invited his friend, the entomologist Alexander Bierig (1884–1963), to stay with him on his plantation. On the night of 30 June, while out collecting insects, Nevermann and Bierig were accidentally shot by an American hunter passing through the area, who had mistaken them for an animal. Nevermann died of his injuries in the hospital at Limón on 3 July 1938. Bierig was shot in the shoulder, but survived.

in 1941 Nevermann's collection of Costa Rican Coleoptera was accessioned by the U.S. National Museum. It comprised 33,000 specimens including representatives of 2,800 species, with types of around 400 species, 10,000 Coleoptera that were unidentified, plus Nevermann's field notes and observations.
