= Agra liv =

Scientific classification
- Kingdom: Animalia
- Phylum: Arthropoda
- Clade: Pancrustacea
- Class: Insecta
- Order: Coleoptera
- Suborder: Adephaga
- Family: Carabidae
- Genus: Agra
- Species: A. liv

Binomial name
- Agra liv Erwin, 2002

Species of beetle

Agra liv is a species of carabid beetle found in Costa Rica and Panama. It is named after the actress Liv Tyler, starlet of the movie Armageddon, because the "existence of this species of elegant beetle is dependent upon the rainforest not undergoing an armageddon."

The holotype was collected in Costa Rica and first described to science in 2002.

Agra liv measure 14–15.5 mm (0.55–0.61 in) in length and 3.4–4.6 mm (0.13–0.18 in) in width.

== See also ==
- List of organisms named after famous people (born 1975–present)
