= Max Liebke =

German entomologist (1892–1945)

- Born: 12 February 1892; Hamburg, Germany
- Died: 1945 (aged 52–53)
- Scientific career
- Fields: Entomology

Max Liebke (12 February 1892 – 1945) was a German entomologist, who researched ground beetles. He wrote in a journal called Entomologischer Anzeiger, describing beetles that he discovered.

Liebke was born Max Heinrich Wilhelm Liebke in Hamburg on 12 February 1892. His parents were Ernst August Julius Liebke and Anna Margaretha Dorothea Liebke (nee Wenk).

On 21 February 1914 in Hamburg, 22 year old Liebke married 21 year old Minna Caroline Marie Antonie Elisabeth Amthor. Both are described as Lutherans on their marriage record.

Between 1927 and 1940, Liebke authored at least 33 scientific papers, mainly about Carabidae.

Liebke was listed as missing at Posen [Poznań, Poland] in 1944. Like's birth registration document bears an official stamp noting that he was formally declared dead on 11 October 1951, but is considered to have been dead by the end of 1945.

In 1932 Liebke gifted 5,344 beetle specimens to the Zoological Museum in Hamburg. Liebke's carabidae collection was partially destroyed during World War II, but some specimens survived and were moved to the collections of the Polish Academy of Sciences in Warsaw. Liebke also described species from material loaned to him by other scientists, including beetles later returned to Ferdinand Nevermann (1881–1938) whose collection is now at the Smithsonian Museum.
