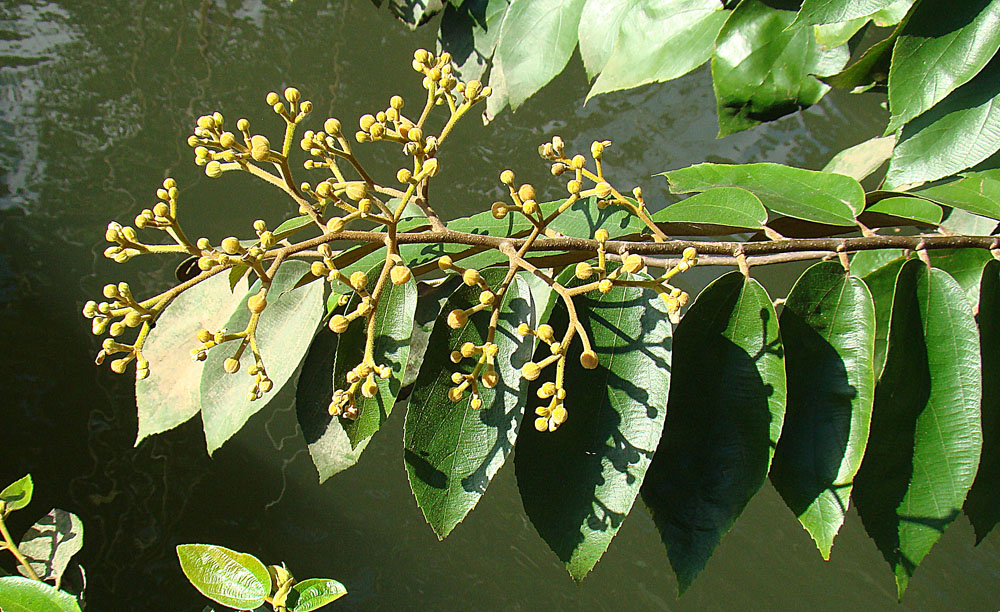
- Flower buds and leaves
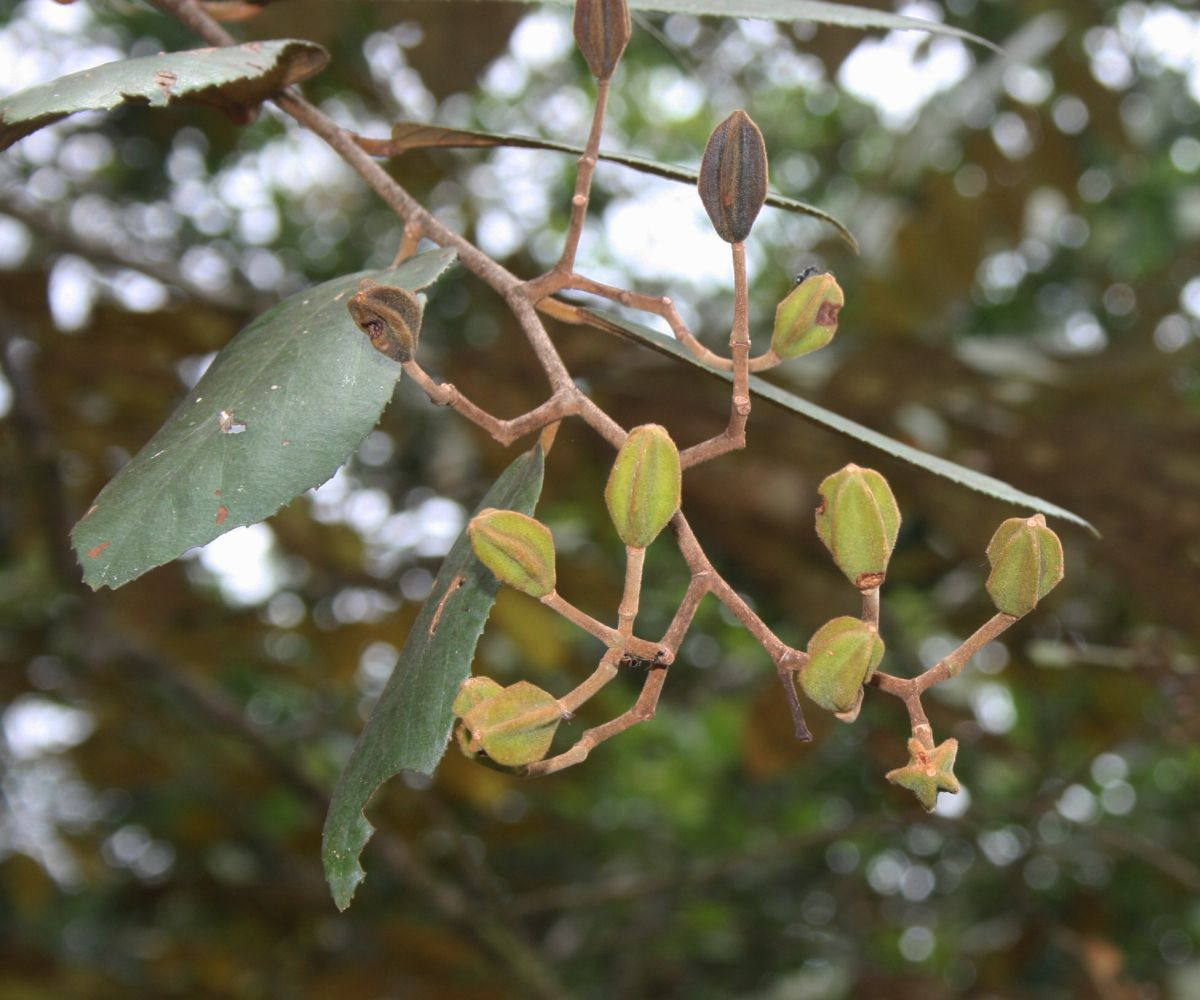
- Fruit

Conservation status
- Least Concern (IUCN 3.1)

Scientific classification
- Kingdom: Plantae
- Clade: Tracheophytes
- Clade: Angiosperms
- Clade: Eudicots
- Clade: Rosids
- Order: Malvales
- Family: Malvaceae
- Genus: Luehea
- Species: L. seemannii

Binomial name
- Luehea seemannii Triana & Planch.

Synonyms
- Luehea rufescens Seem.; Luehea seemannii var. chocoensis Cuatrec.

= Luehea seemannii =

Species of plant

Luehea seemannii is a widespread species of flowering plant in the family Malvaceae. It is native to southern Mexico, Central America, Colombia, and Venezuela, and it has been introduced to Puerto Rico. A large canopy tree, it is found in tropical and subtropical forests, and has been assessed as Least Concern. In a study in the Panama Canal Zone, Luehea seemannii was found to host 945 species of beetles.

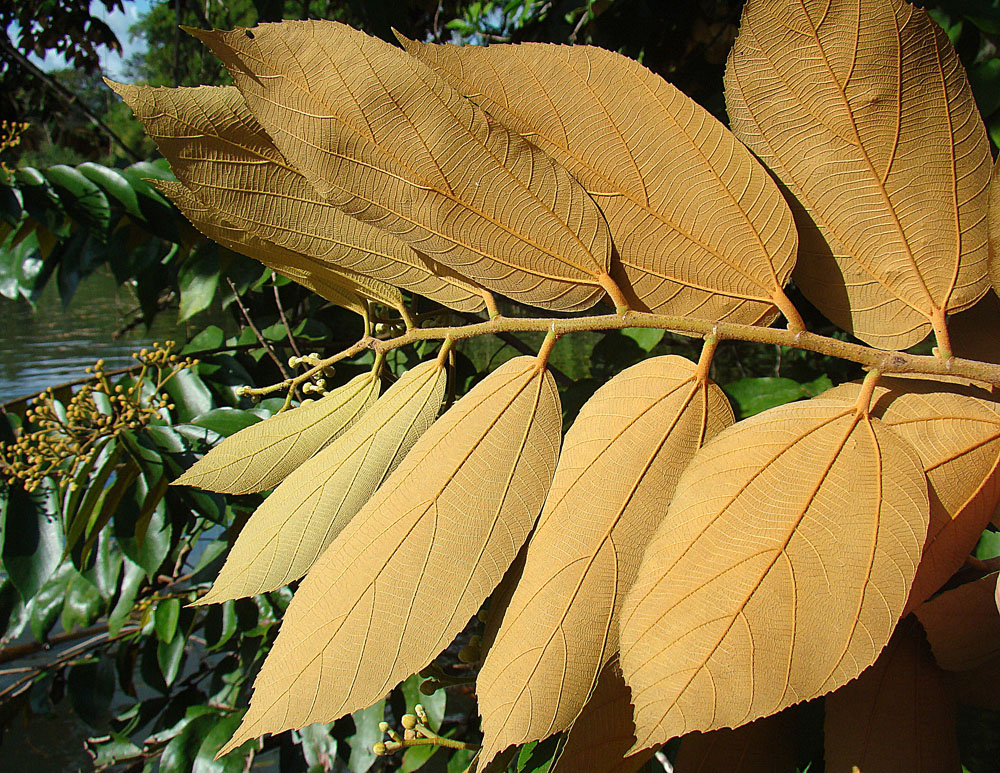
Leaf undersides
