= Donald R. Whitehead =

American entomologist (1938–1990)

- Born: 1938
- Died: 1990 (aged 51–52)
- Scientific career
- Fields: Entomology
- Workplaces: USDA

Donald Robert Whitehead (1938–1990) was an American entomologist, who specialized in the study of the biogeography and systematics of weevils.

Whitehead was awarded his Bachelor of Science degree in 1961 from Rutgers University and his PhD from the University of Alberta in 1971.

In 1976, Whitehead was appointed Research Entomologist in the Systematic Entomology Laboratory of the United States Department of Agriculture, where he conducted taxonomic work at the National Museum of Natural History. He remained in this position until his death in 1990.
