= Terry Erwin =

American entomologist (1940–2020)

Terry Lee Erwin
- Born: December 1, 1940; St. Helena, California, U.S.
- Died: May 11, 2020 (aged 79)
- Education: University of Alberta; San Jose State University
- Scientific career
- Fields: Entomology
- Workplaces: Harvard University; Smithsonian Institution

Terry Lee Erwin (December 1, 1940 – May 11, 2020) was an American entomologist with the Smithsonian Institution.

== Early life ==
Erwin went to Vallejo High School and then graduated in biology in 1964, followed by a masters in 1966 from San Jose State College (now San Jose State University). He went to the University of Alberta to study carabid beetles under George Ball, obtaining a Ph.D. in 1969 followed by a post-doctoral stint at Harvard under P. Jackson Darlington, Jr.

== Career ==
He took up an entomologist position in the United States National Museum (later the Smithsonian Institution) but took a year off to study carabid beetles at the University of Lund under Carl H. Lindroth.

On return in 1971, Erwin was deputed to examine the beetles of Panama. By fogging the forest canopy with pesticide, he collected the falling specimens and found 1,200 species of beetles living in Luehea seemannii trees. Of those 1,200 species of beetles, he estimated that 163 are found only in the Luehea seemannii tree and not in other species of trees. There are about 50,000 species of trees in the tropics and beetles make up 40% of insects and related animals. Erwin estimated that there are about twice as many species of insects and related animals in tropical trees as there are on the ground of the forest. Erwin is notable for his controversial extrapolation of 30 million as the total number of arthropod species.

Erwin served as secretary of the Society of Systematic Biologists from 1973 to 1975, and was the editor in chief of ZooKeys. He described over 20 genera and more than 400 species of insect, and as of 2015 is commemorated in the names of 47 species, two genera, one subfamily and one subspecies.
