= Mikan (disambiguation) =

A mikan is a citrus fruit, also variously called Citrus unshiu, unshu mikan, Wenzhou migan, or a satsuma.

Mikan may also refer to:

== People ==
- Joseph Gottfried Mikan (also J.G. Mikan; 1743–1814), Austrian-Czech botanist
- Johann Christian Mikan (also J.C. Mikan; 1769–1844), Austrian-Czech botanist, zoologist, and entomologist, son of Joseph Gottfried Mikan
- George Mikan (1924–2005), American professional basketball player
  - Mikan Drill, basketball drill commonly credited to George Mikan and Ray Meyer
- Ed Mikan (1925–1999), American basketball player, younger brother of George Mikan
- Larry Mikan (born 1948), American basketball player, son of George Mikan
- George L. Mikan III (born 1971), American businessman, son of Larry Mikan

== Fictional characters ==
- Mikan Sakura, fictional character in the manga and anime series Alice Academy
- Mikan Yuuki, fictional character from the Japanese anime and manga series To Love-Ru
- Mikan Tsumiki, fictional character from the Danganronpa series
- Jasmine (Pokémon) (known as Mikan in the Japanese version), a Johto gym leader from the Pokémon series
- Mikan Hinatsuki a character from the manga and anime The Demon Girl Next Door

== Other uses ==
- "Mikan" (song), 2007 single by J-pop idol group Morning Musume
- Mikan (cat), station master cat of Ciaotou Sugar Refinery metro station in Kaohsiung, Taiwan

== See also ==
- Mican (disambiguation)
- Mikanic, South African rock group
- Bemerhak Negia Mikan (English: A Touch Away), album by Israeli rock singer and guitarist Izhar Ashdot
- Mikan Enikki (English: Mikan Picture Diary), Japanese manga series by Miwa Abiko
