= Mican (disambiguation) =

Mican is an Azerbaijani village and municipality.

Mican may also refer to:

- Mican (surname), Romanian and Turkish surname
- Mičan family, Bohemian noble family from the Holy Roman Empire
- Miçan, Mountain in Albania
- MICAN, Modular Integrated Capability for ACDF and North Sea concept, see Multifunctional Support Ship

== See also ==
- Mikan (disambiguation)
