= Žerotín =

Žerotín may refer to places in the Czech Republic:

- Žerotín (Louny District), a municipality and village in the Ústí nad Labem Region
- Žerotín (Olomouc District), a municipality and village in the Olomouc Region

== See also ==
- Zierotin family (also called Žerotín), a noble family
