= Qəzli =

Qəzli or Gazli may refer to:

- Qəzli, Ismailli, Azerbaijan
- Qəzli, Sabirabad, Azerbaijan
- Qezli, Iran, a village in Golestan Province, Iran
- Gazli, Uzbekistan

== See also ==
- Gezeli (disambiguation), places in Iran
