= Gezeli =

Gezeli or Gazli (Persian: گزلي) may refer to:

- Gezeli-ye Sofla

== See also ==
- Gazli (disambiguation)
