= Bílichov =

- Municipality
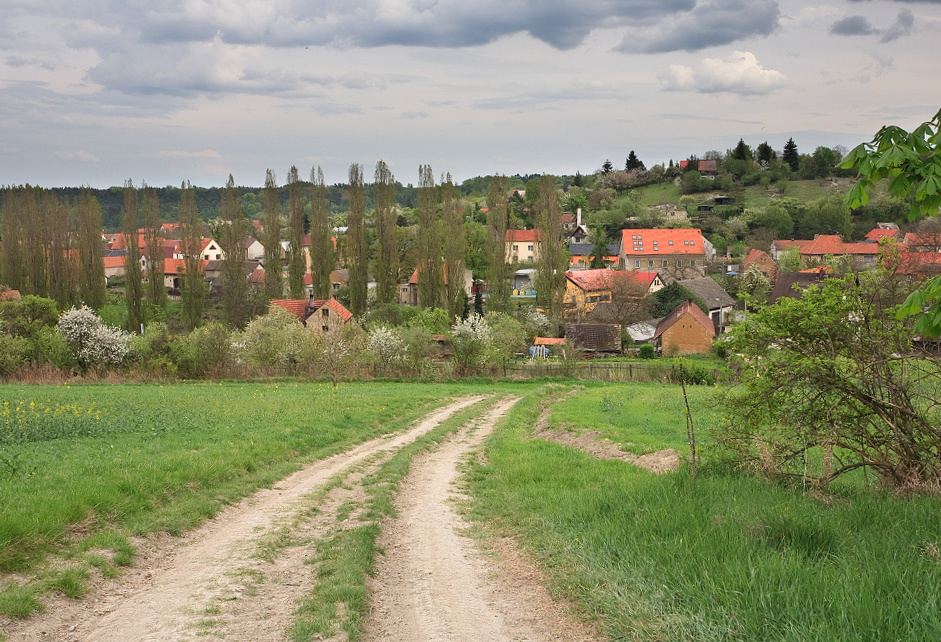
- General view

- Flag Coat of arms

- Location in the Czech Republic
- Coordinates: 50°15′44″N 13°54′59″E
- Country: Czech Republic
- Region: Central Bohemian
- District: Kladno
- First mentioned: 1407

Area
  - Total: 12.21 km^{2} (4.71 sq mi)
- Elevation: 365 m (1,198 ft)

Population (2026-01-01)
  - Total: 215
  - Density: 17.6/km^{2} (45.6/sq mi)
- Time zone: UTC+1 (CET)
  - Summer (DST): UTC+2 (CEST)
- Postal code: 273 74
- Website: www.bilichov.cz

Bílichov is a municipality and village in Kladno District in the Central Bohemian Region of the Czech Republic. It has about 200 inhabitants.

== Etymology ==
The initial name of the settlement was Bílechov. The name was derived from the personal name Bílech, meaning "Bílech's (court)". Since 1600 at the latest, the current name has been used.

== Geography ==
Bílichov is located about 18 kilometres (11 mi) northwest of Kladno and 37 km (23 mi) northwest of Prague. It lies mostly in the Džbán range, only a small eastern part of the municipal territory extends into the Lower Ohře Table. The highest point is at 453 m (1,486 ft) above sea level. The stream Zlonický potok (here also called Bílichovský potok) originates in the municipality and supplies a set of small fishponds.

There are four small-scale protected areas in the municipality: national nature monuments Bílichovské údolí and Cikánský dolík, and nature monuments Smradovna and Na Pilavě.

== History ==
The first written mention of Bílichov is from 1407, when it was part of the Žerotín estate.

== Demographics ==
Historical population

Year	Pop.	±%
1869	333	—
1880	405	+21.6%
1890	390	−3.7%
1900	394	+1.0%
1910	395	+0.3%

Year	Pop.	±%
1921	403	+2.0%
1930	359	−10.9%
1950	262	−27.0%
1961	255	−2.7%
1970	210	−17.6%

Year	Pop.	±%
1980	155	−26.2%
1991	152	−1.9%
2001	134	−11.8%
2011	182	+35.8%
2021	196	+7.7%

Source: Censuses

== Transport ==
There are no railways or major roads passing through the municipality.

== Sights ==
The main landmark of Bílichov is the Chapel of Saint Wenceslaus. It was built at the end of the 19th century.
