= Carl Friedrich Philipp von Martius =

German botanist (1794–1868)

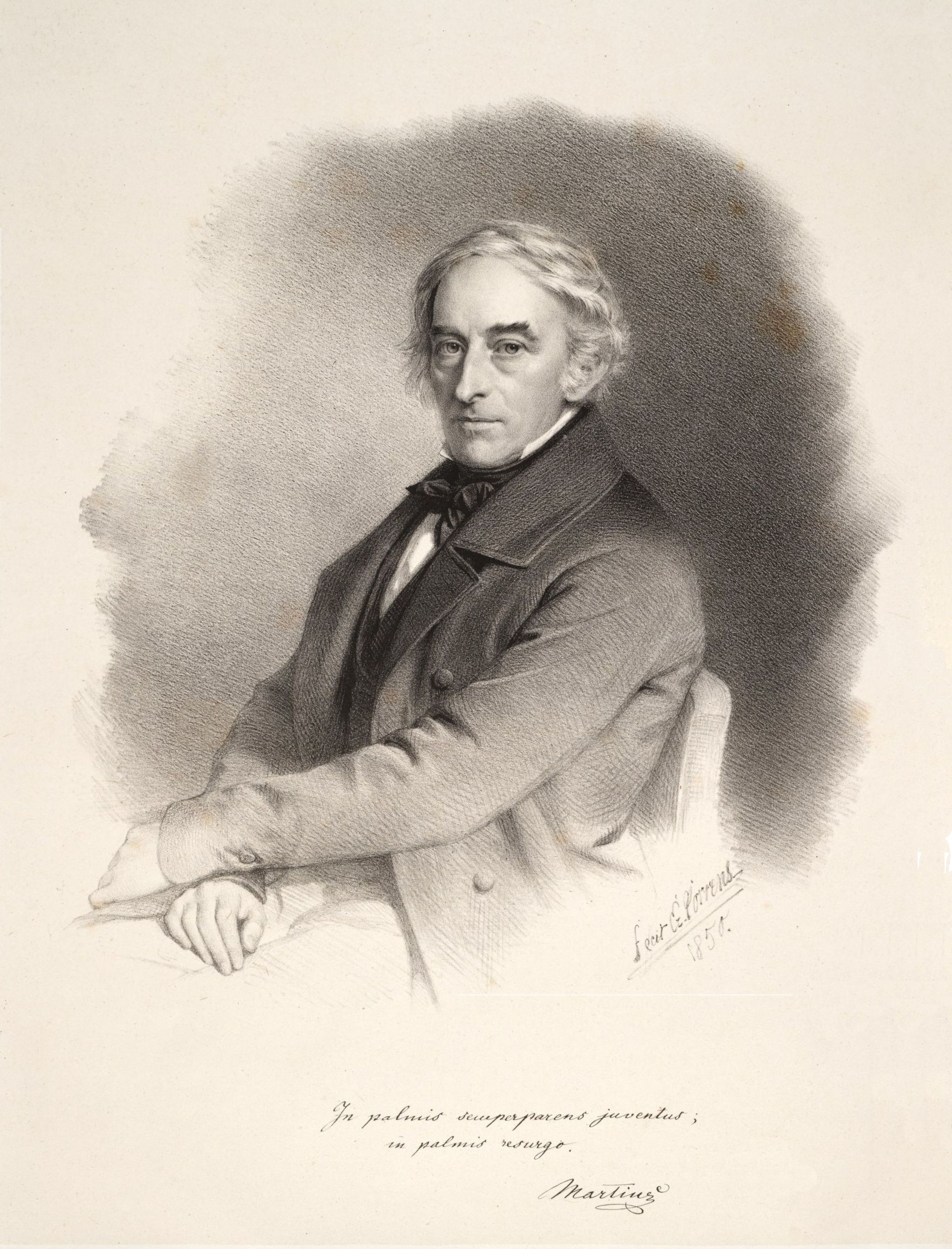
- Martius in 1850
- Born: 17 April 1794; Erlangen, Principality of Bayreuth
- Died: 13 December 1868 (aged 74); Munich, Kingdom of Bavaria
- Education: University of Erlangen
- Scientific career
- Fields: Botany, exploration
- Workplaces: Bavarian Academy of Sciences and Humanities; Ludwig-Maximilians-Universität München
- Academic advisors: Johann Baptist von Spix
- Doctoral students: Louis Agassiz
- Author abbrev. (botany): Mart.

Carl Friedrich Philipp von Martius (17 April 1794 – 13 December 1868) was a German botanist and explorer. Between 1817 and 1820, he traveled 10,000 km through Brazil while collecting botanical specimens. In 1840 he became the founding editor of Flora Brasiliensis, a comprehensive flora of Brazil, which was not completed until 1906, 62 years after his death.

== Life ==
Von Martius was born in Erlangen, the son of Prof Ernst Wilhelm Martius, court apothecary.

He graduated with a PhD from the University of Erlangen in 1814, publishing as his thesis a critical catalogue of plants in the university's botanical garden. After that he continued to devote himself to botanical study, and in 1817 he and Johann Baptist von Spix were sent to Brazil by Maximilian I Joseph, the King of Bavaria. They traveled from Rio de Janeiro through several of the southern and eastern provinces of Brazil and traveled up the Amazon River to Tabatinga, as well as exploring some of its larger tributaries.

On his return to Europe in 1820, von Martius was appointed as the keeper of the Botanic Garden of Munich, including the herbarium at the Munich Botanical Collection, and in 1826 as professor of botany at the Ludwig-Maximilians-Universität München (the university in Munich), and he held both offices until 1864. He devoted his chief attention to the flora of Brazil, and in addition to numerous short papers he published the Nova Genera et Species Plantarum Brasiliensium (1823–1832, 3 vols.) and Icones selectae Plantarum Cryptogamicarum Brasiliensium (1827), both works being finely illustrated. He is credited for introducing the word hypothecium in this latter work, referring to a specific layer of tissue in a lichen fruiting body that his extensive microscopical work had revealed.

An account of his travels in Brazil appeared in three volumes between 1823 and 1831, with an atlas of plates, but probably the work by which he is best known is his Historia naturalis palmarum (1823–1850) in three large folio volumes, in which all known genera of the palm family are described and illustrated. The work contains more than 240 chromolithographs, with habitat sketches and botanical dissections. In 1840, he began the Flora Brasiliensis, with the assistance of the most distinguished European botanists, who undertook monographs of the various orders. Its publication was continued after his death under the editorship of A. W. Eichler (1839–1887) until 1887, and subsequently of Ignatz Urban. At completion, the Flora described almost 23,000 plants, of which 5,689 were new to science. He also edited several works on the zoological collections made in Brazil by Spix, after the death of the latter in 1826. In 1837, he was elected a foreign member of the Royal Swedish Academy of Sciences.

On the outbreak of potato disease in Europe he investigated it and published his observations in 1842. He also published works and short papers on the aborigines of Brazil, on their civil and social condition, on their past and probable future, on their diseases and medicines, and on the languages of the various tribes, especially the Tupi. He died in Munich; his gravestone is decorated with two palm fronds and the Latin inscription In palmis semper virens resurgo.

A species of South American snake, Hydrops martii, is named in his honor. The Martiusstraße in Munich is named after him.

He married Franziska von Stengel (1801–1843). His son was German chemist, entrepreneur and company founder Carl Alexander von Martius (1838–1920).

According to the Puerto Rican historian Cayetano Coll y Toste, von Martius was the first person to describe the Indigenous peoples of Haiti as "Taini" (Taino) in 1867. However, Constantine Samuel Rafinesque had referred to the "Taino of Hayti" in his 1836 work The American Nations. The archaeologist L. Antonio Curet has written that Martius described these peoples as "Taini...perhaps by mistaking the qualifier for an ethnonym".

In 2012, botanists Harley & J.F.B.Pastore named a genus of flowering plants from Brazil and Peru, belonging to the family Lamiaceae as Martianthus in his honour.

His birthday, 17 April, is International Palm Day, an observance by the International Palm Society to raise awareness of the conservation plight of palms.

== Herbarium Martii ==
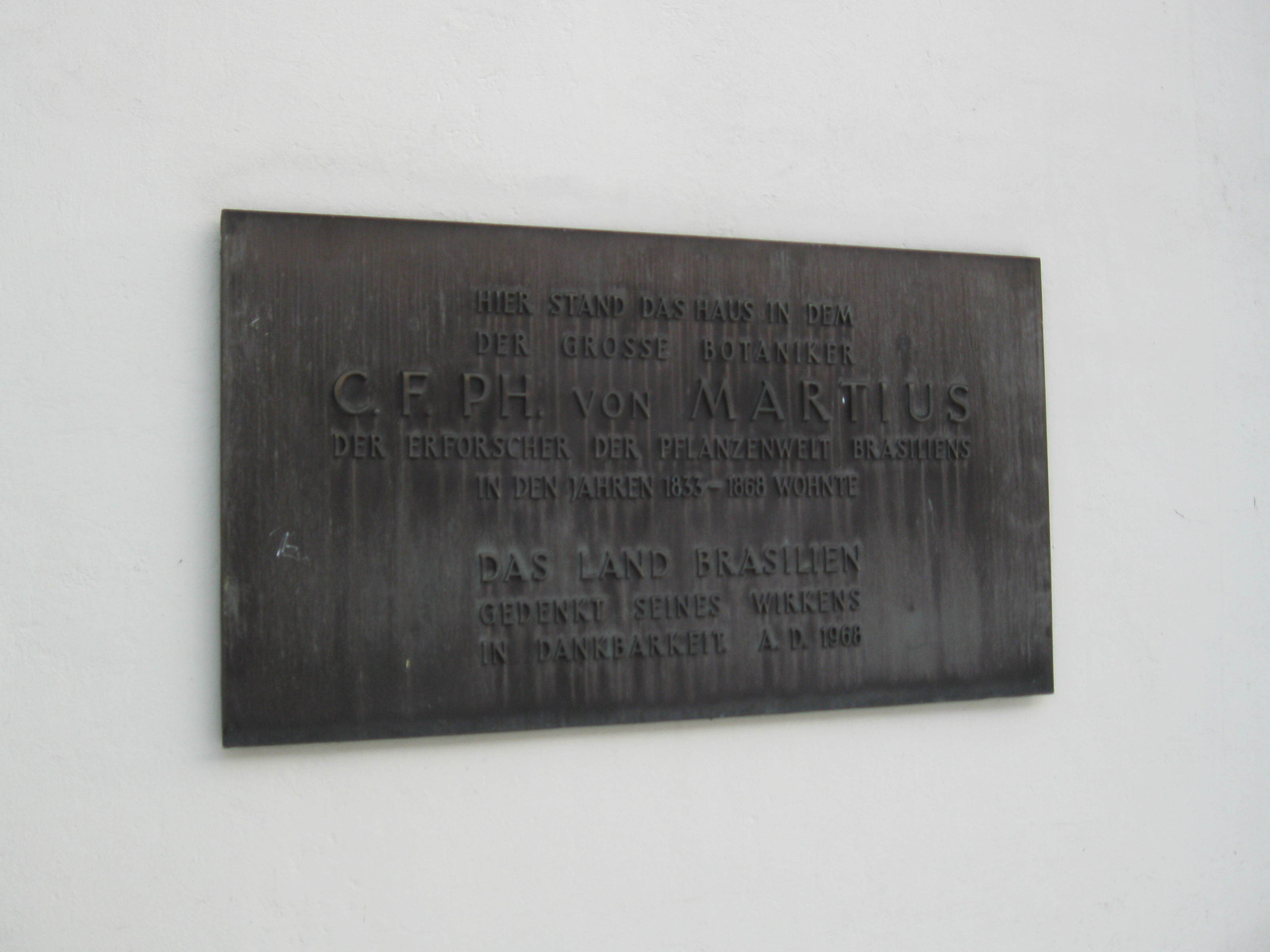
Memorial plaque for Martius in Munich, erected 1968 by the State of Brazil.

As well as a huge collection of flora specimens owned by Martius prior to his departure to South America, he returned with another 12,000 specimens which together formed the Herbarium Martii. At the time of his death the collection had been further expanded and comprised 300,000 specimens representing 65,000 species from around the world, and was one of the largest private herbaria assembled.

The Belgian government acquired the private collection in 1870 which formed the basis of the then newly established Jardin botanique de l'Etat. The collection is now held as part of the National Botanic Garden of Belgium. The collection made by Martius himself between 1817 and 1820 in Brazil with moremost at 25,000–30,000 specimens representing 7,300 species as well as some later collections was given to the Bavarian Academy of Sciences and Humanities and integrated as part of the herbarium of the now Botanische Staatssammlung München already during his life time.

The Martius Project is an effort by the Botanic Garden Meise to digitize the entire collection.

Other herbaria also hold specimens collected by von Martius, including at the New York Botanical Gardens, the Kew Herbarium and National Herbarium of Victoria (MEL), Royal Botanic Gardens Victoria.

Between 1837 and 1841 Martius published an exsiccata-like series with the title Herbarium florae Brasiliensis. Plantae Brasilienses exsiccatae, quas denominatas, partim diagnosi aut observationibus instructas botanophilis offert Dr. C. Fr. Ph. de Martius. This series is distributed with several sets and found in several herbaria.

== Route followed in Brazil during 1817–1820 expedition ==
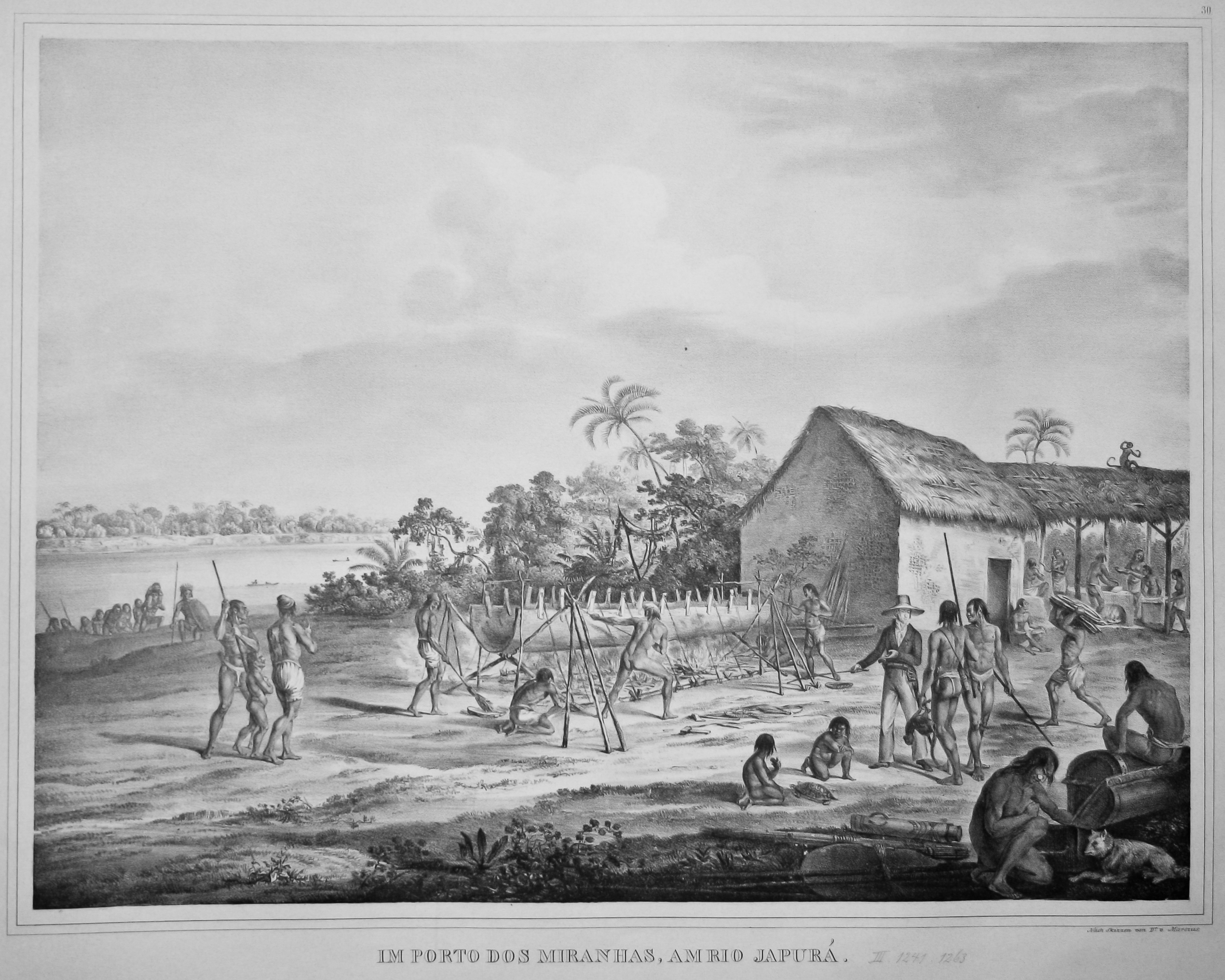
Travels in Brazil, in the years 1817–1820

Martius and Spix, accompanied by Johann Christian Mikan, his wife and the artist Thomas Ender travelled to Brazil with the Austrian Commission, which joined the wedding train of Archduchess Leopoldina of Austria and Dom Pedro de Alcantara, the future Emperor of Brazil. The party left from Trieste on 10 April 1817.

The first natural history collections were made in the city of Rio de Janeiro at Laranjeiras, Corcovado, Aqueduto, Fonte da Carioca, Tijuca, Botafogo, Jardim Botanico immediately following the wedding.

Spix and Martius then spent some days at "Fazenda Mandioca" with Grigori Ivanovitch Langsdorff and then went to a fazenda near Rio Paraiba before returning to Rio. A mounted expedition took them on horseback to Itaguaí (13 December 1817) through São Paulo state to the city of São Paulo where they arrived on 31 December 1817. They left on 9 January 1818 for Sorocaba and Itu on to Minas Gerais, then through Camanducaia to cross the Rio Sapucaí for São Gonçalo and Ouro Prêto. On 1 May 1818, they left for Diamantina, Minas Novas and then Montes Claros.

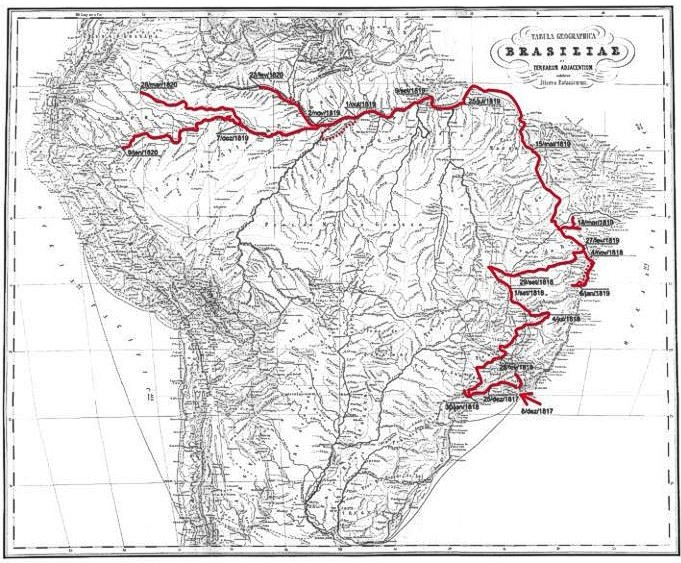
Route followed by Martius and Spix between 1817 and 1820

On 12 August 1818, they headed North-North East to Rio Carinhanha, as far as the Serra Geral then returned by Codó to Carinhanha arriving at Rio de Contas on 17 October 1818, then riding east to cross the Rio Paraguaçu arriving at Salvador on 10 November 1818, and leaving on 18 February 1819 via Coit and Jacobina. The party then travelled to Piauí, Oeiras where they arrived on 3 May. They departed on 11 May, arriving on 15 May at São Gonçalo do Amarante, where Martius became seriously ill. Spix had at this time contracted the schistosomiasis from which he eventually died.

On 3 June 1819, they arrived in Maranhão to replenish funds and supplies. They then sailed down the Rio Itapicuru to São Luis from where they left on 20 July for Belém, arriving there on 25 July, having collected specimens at several places in between. They left Belém on 21 August for an Amazon voyage, up the Tocantins to Breves, arriving in Gurupá on 9 September and Porto de Moz on the Rio Xingu on 10 September. They spent 19 September through 30th in Santarém, arriving at Barra do Rio Negro on 22 October and leaving on 2 November. They reached Tefé, then called Ega, on 26 November, then split up.

Spix left Tefé on 7 December 1819, for Solimões and visiting Tabatinga before returning to Manaus on 3 February 1820. He then travelled up the Rio Negro to Moura, Barcelos returning to Manaus on 26 February. Martius left Tefé on 12 December, ascended Rio Japurá, returning to Manaus on 11 March, where they reunited. They departed for Belém arriving on 16 April 1820, and left for Europe on 13 June 1820.

After this journey, Martius and Spix published their account of their travels and work in Brazil. In the appendix, they included a piece of dance music, a lundu, the earliest example of this form of music recorded, now named Lundu: Recolhido por C.P.F. von Martius. A performance of this work by Orquestra e Coro Vox Brasiliensis & Ricardo Kanji is included in their recording História da Música Brasileira – Período Colonial II.

== Selected publications ==
- Versuch einer Monographie der Sennesblätter . Junge, Erlangen 1857 Digital edition by the University and State Library Düsseldorf
- Goethe und Martius . Nemayer, Mittenwald 1932 Digital edition by the University and State Library Düsseldorf
- Martius, Karl Friedrich Philipp von (1835). Conspectus regni vegetabilis: secundum characteres morphologicos praesertim carpicos in classes ordines et familias digesti... (in Latin and German). Nuremberg: Schrag.
- — (1824). Nova genera et species plantarum :quas in itinere per Brasiliam MDCCCXVII-MDCCCXX jussu et auspiciis Maximiliani Josephi I., Bavariae regis augustissimi instituto. 3 vols (in Latin). Munich: Lindaueri.

== See also ==
- List of plants of Atlantic Forest vegetation of Brazil
- List of plants of Caatinga vegetation of Brazil
- List of plants of Cerrado vegetation of Brazil
- List of plants of Pantanal vegetation of Brazil

=== Sources ===
- "Martius, Carl Friedrich Philipp van (1794-1868)". Global Plants. JSTOR.
- "Flora Brasiliensis On-Line". The Centro de Referência em Informação Ambiental, CRIA (Reference Center on Environmental Information) (in Portuguese and English). 22 March 2006.
- "Introdução à Herpetologia do Brasil O contexto científico e político da expedição bávara ao Brasil de Johann Baptist von Spix & Johann Georg Wagler". Imaginario (in Spanish). Archived from the original on 14 August 2007.
- "Online database of digitized works". Gallica (in French). – click on 'Recherche' link and enter "Martius" as 'Auteur'
- This article incorporates text from a publication now in the public domain: Chisholm, Hugh, ed. (1911). "Martius, Carl Friedrich Philipp von". Encyclopædia Britannica. Vol. 17 (11th ed.). Cambridge University Press. p. 803.
