= Mičan family =

Mičan
- Parent family: Klinštejns, Ronovci
- Country: Holy Roman Empire
- Origin: Bohemia
- Founded: 15th century
- Founder: Jindřich Mičan
- Titles: Imperial Barons
- Connected members: Friedrich Mičan von Klinstein und Rostok
- Estates: Žehrovice Estate, Kornhaus Estate, Čelechovic Estate, Rischburg Estate
- Dissolution: 1663

The Mičan family was a Bohemian noble family from the Holy Roman Empire.

== History ==
The family can be traced back to at least the early 15th century, when a Jindřich Mičan von Klinstein was active in northern Bohemia. Jindřich's possessions passed to his son Jan (Johann), who died in 1503. The estates were then inherited by and divided among Johan's sons.

In the records of the time, the family was also listed as Míčan of Klinštejn and Roztoky (German: Mičan von Klinstein und Rostok, Czech: Míčanové z Klinštejna a z Roztok). In the second half of the 15th century, the family owned small estates in northern Bohemia. Their representative was Jindřich from Sulislavice and Roztoky. His descendants acquired Vinařice, Toužetín and Žerotín.

In 1571, Friedrich Mičan von Klinstein und Rostok, Baron of Klinstein and Rostock in Constantinople, was governor of Kornhaus Estate. He also acquired almost all the Žehrovice estate from the Kolowrat-Bezdružický lords, including the Zehrow Castle, which had since become dilapidated. In 1569, Friedrich bought the rest of the estate's granary from the brothers Jan and Zdislav Abdon Kolowrat-Bezdružický. Friederich also sold parts of Čelechovic estate to Georg Borzita von Martinitz in 1578. In 1595, the latter bought the remaining parts of the estate from Friederich's heirs.

Another, later Friederich Mičan von Klinstein is recorded as Imperial Councilor. He was owed a sum of money that his debtors weren't able to return, and as a result was given the Rischburg Estate. His son, Albrecht, inherited this estate after Friederich's death. After Albrecht's death it passed to the latter's wife, Magdalena Mičan (née von Hodkowa).

This branch of the Klinštejns, as well as the Klinštejn family in general, died out with the death of Ignác Vojtěch in 1663 in Prague.
