= Martiusstraße =

Street in Munich, Germany

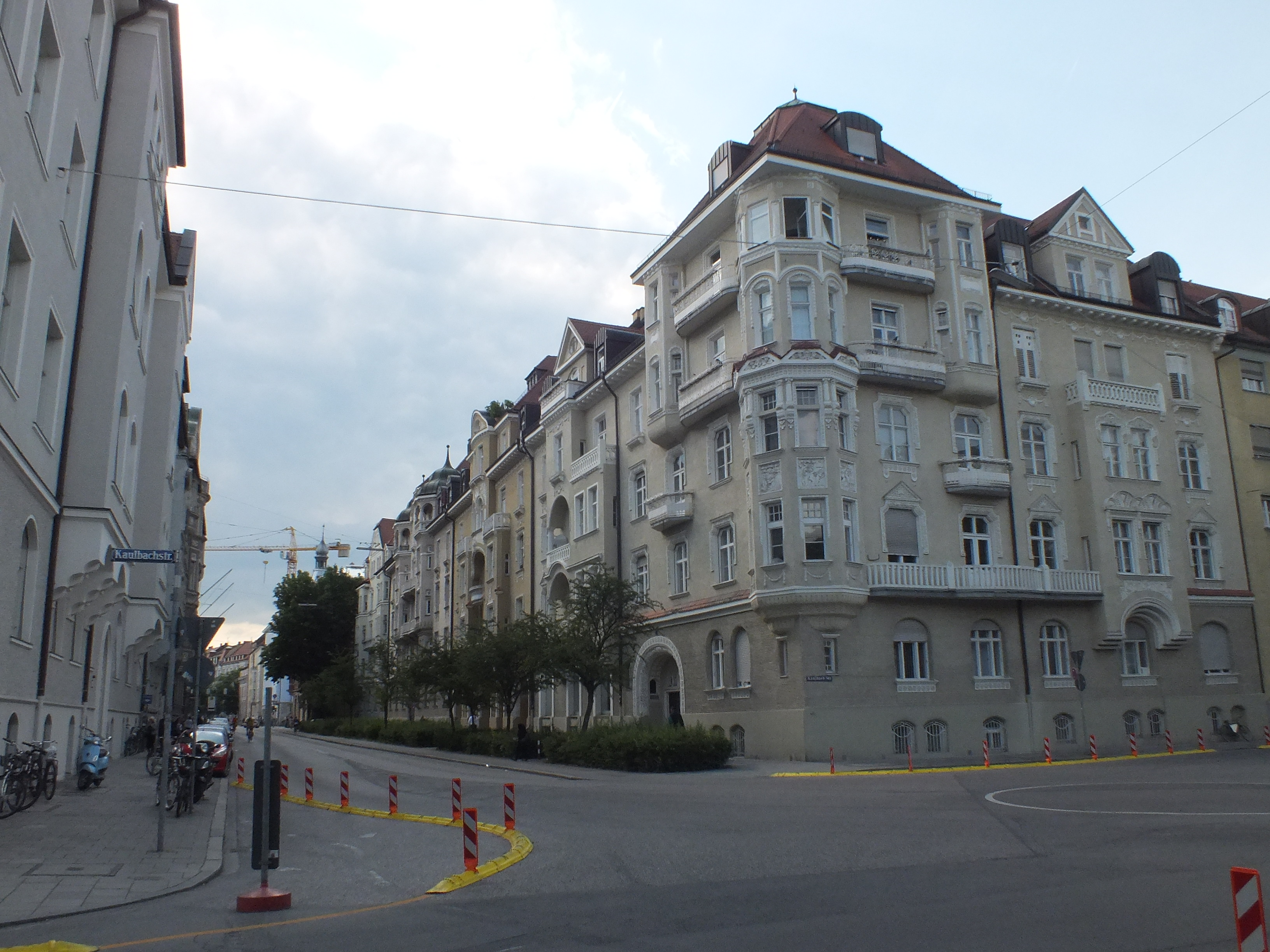
Corner Martius-/Kaulbachstraße

The Martiusstraße in Munich Schwabing leads from Leopoldstraße to Kißkaltplatz. It was named after naturalist Carl Friedrich Philipp von Martius. He was director of the Alter Botanischer Garten in Munich and member of the Bavarian Academy of Sciences and Humanities.

== Appearance ==
The Martiusstraße is a protected building ensemble consisting of a number of state apartment units, which were built in the early 20th century as a closed concept, over a two-year period, in what was then a contemporary Art Nouveau style. The road had already been designed around 1885 before the annexation of Schwabing to Munich, as a connecting piece of road between Leopoldstraße, then still called Schwabinger Landstraße (highway from Schwabing), and Königinstraße. The western section was built between 1906 and 1908 to the then Kaulbachplatz (today Kißkaltplatz). As an eastern extension of the axis between Elisabeth- / Franz-Joseph-Straße, Martiusstraße was also a preferred area for state apartment buildings in Schwabing. Anton Hatzl, architect and owner, built a closed row of four buildings (No. 1, 3, 5, 7) on the north side and another building (No. 4) to the south. They were later supplemented by two similar designed houses (No. 6, 8) by Franz Popp. Only the latter has lost its elaborate facade design due to the removal of damages and debris from the war, therefore the former architectural importance as structurally emphasized prelude of the street line, together with the unchanged object Martiusstraße 7, no longer comes across clearly. Under a uniform conception, four-storey, elegant apartment units in the neo-baroque Art Nouveau style of plasticity and rich ornamentation were created on the short, straight street section. The adjacent buildings complement the street space.

South of Martiusstraße, in the area of house number 2, BLfD's historically protected monument body graves of the early Middle Ages can be found.

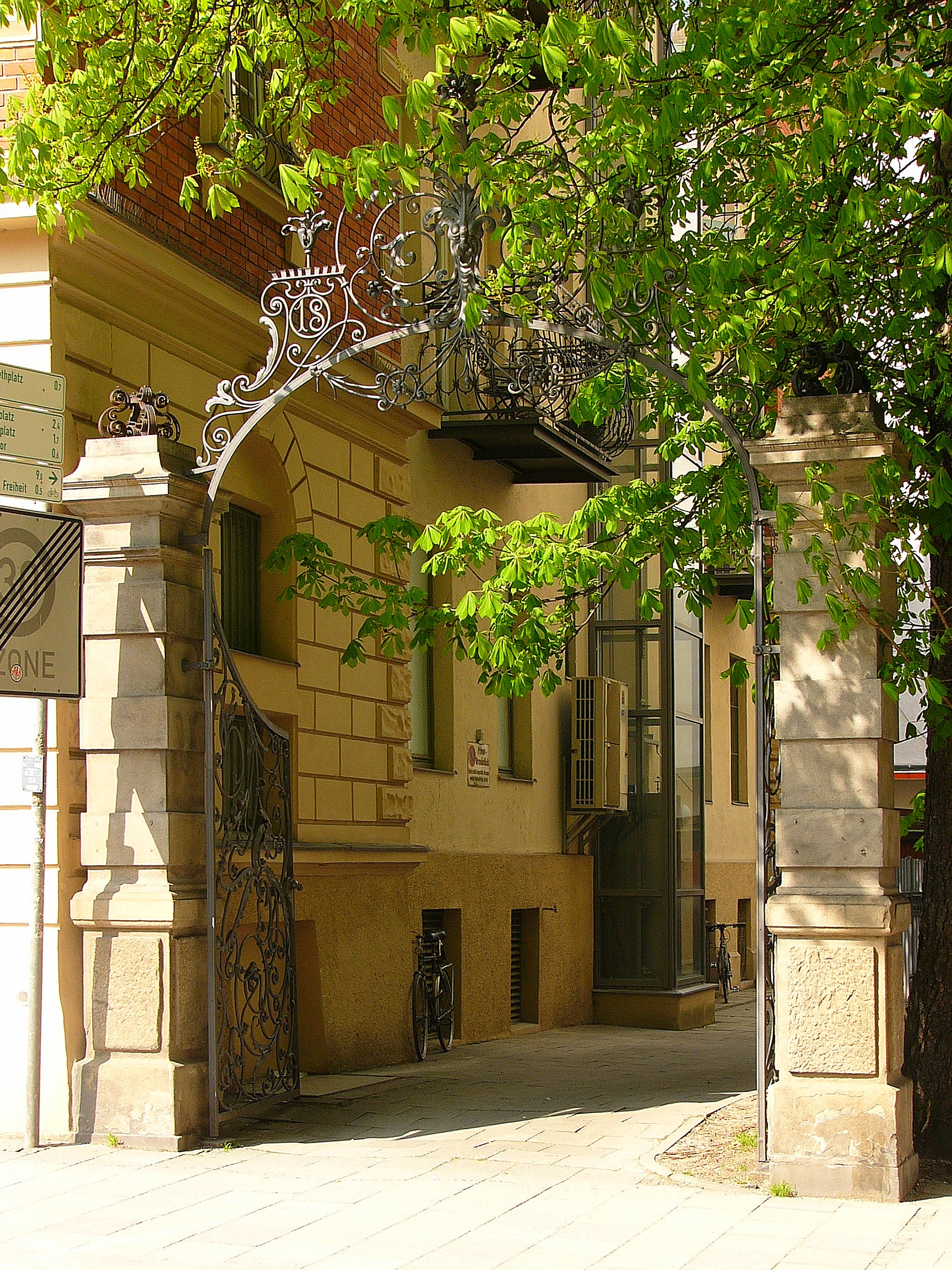
Two gate posts with lattice from 1890 at the beginning of Martiusstraße to the 1889 by Friedrich Steffan neo-Renaissance building on the corner of Leopoldstraße

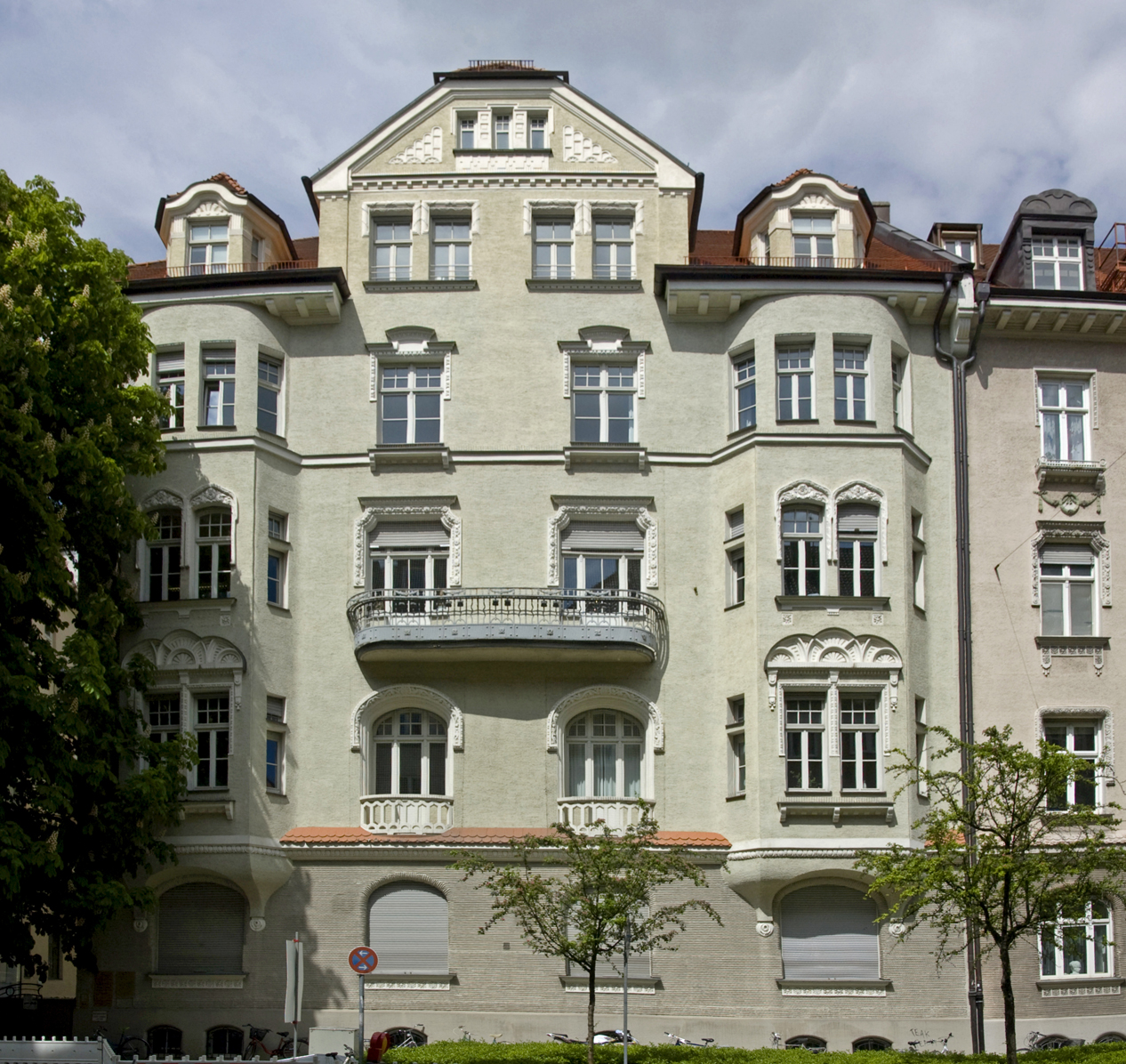
richly structured and stuccoed Art Nouveau building built by Anton Hatzl in 1906–07 with two oriels and gables at Martiusstraße 1

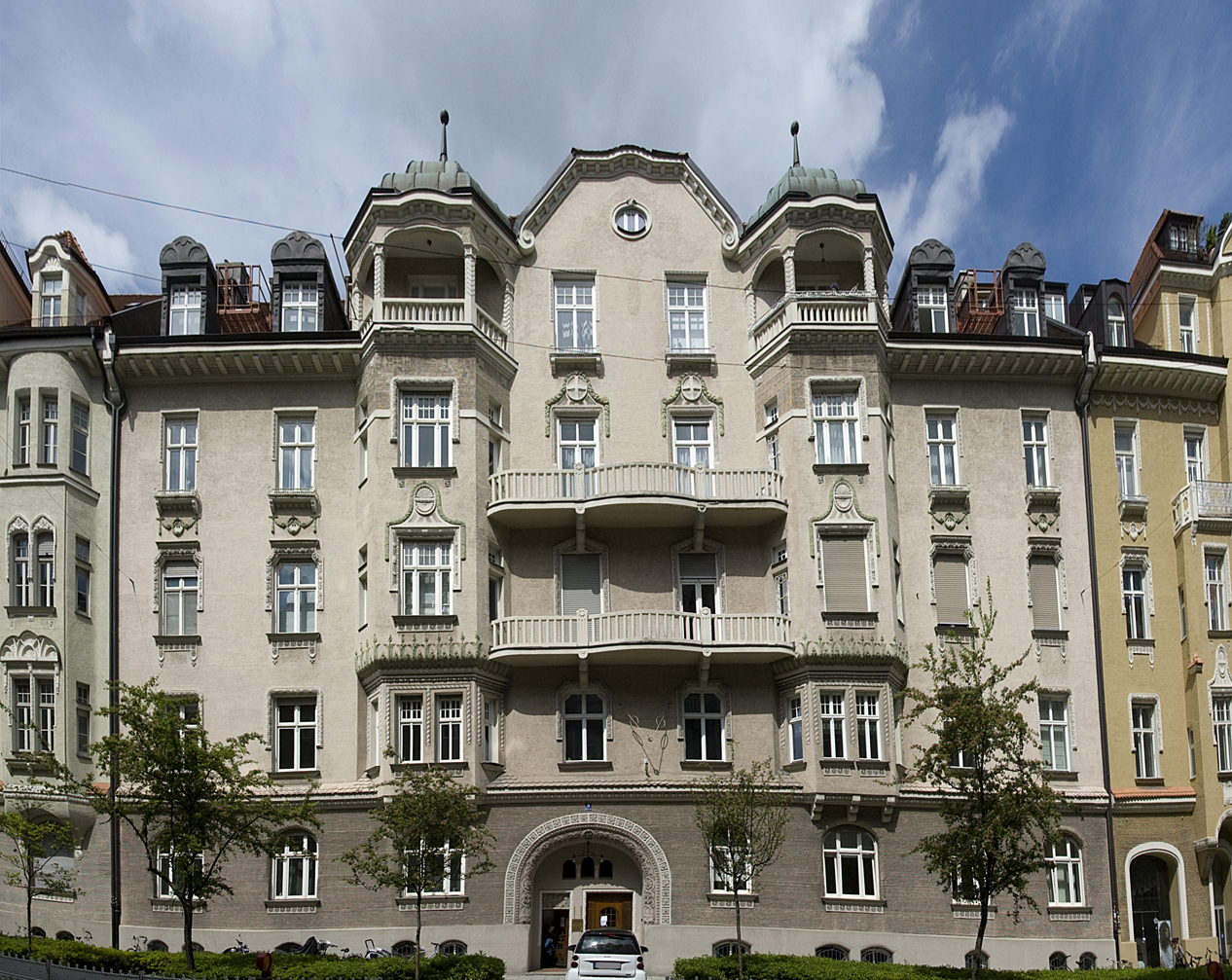
Art Nouveau building built by Anton Hatzl in 1906 with a wide double facade at Martiusstraße 3

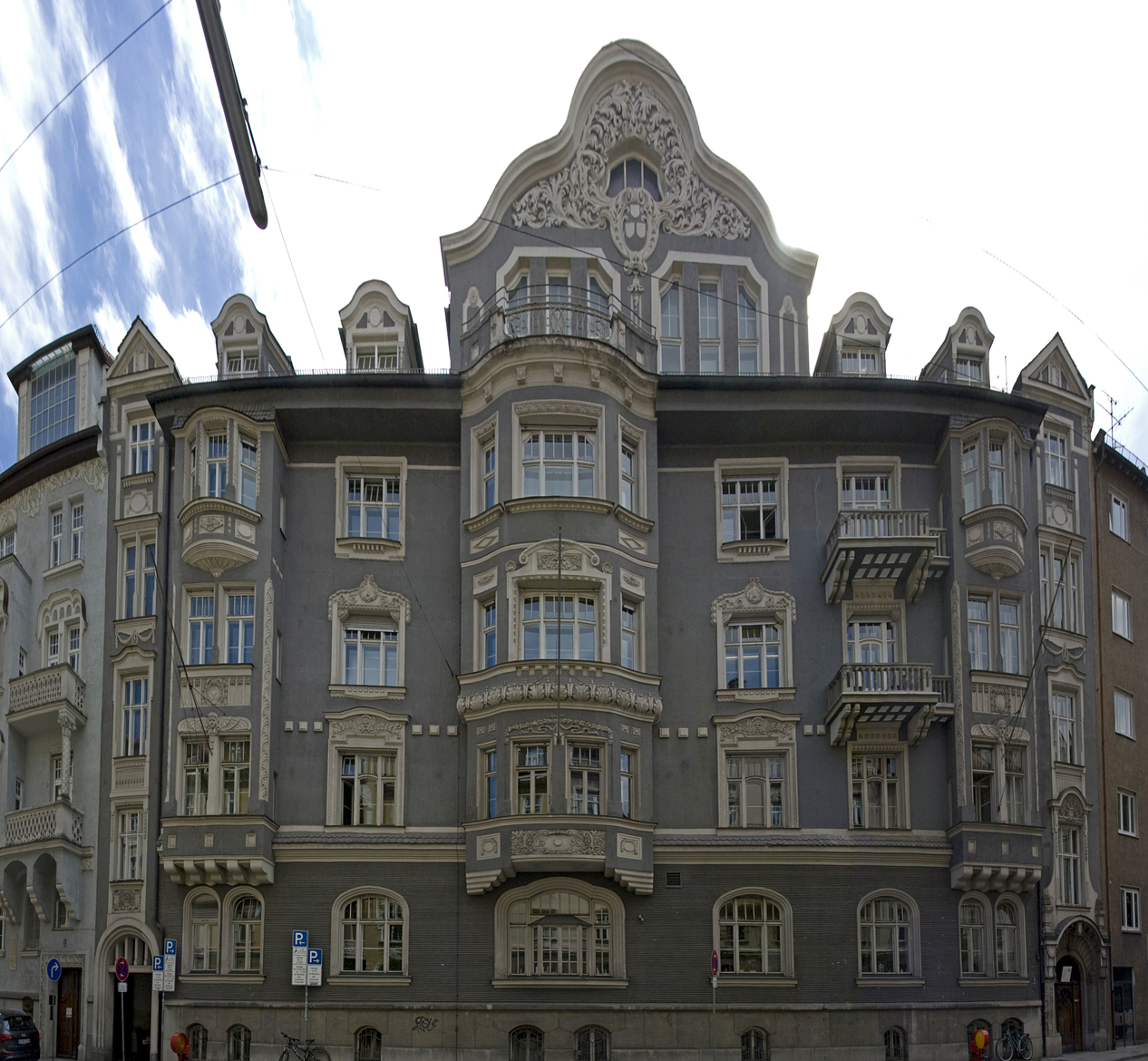
Art Nouveau building at Martiusstraße 4

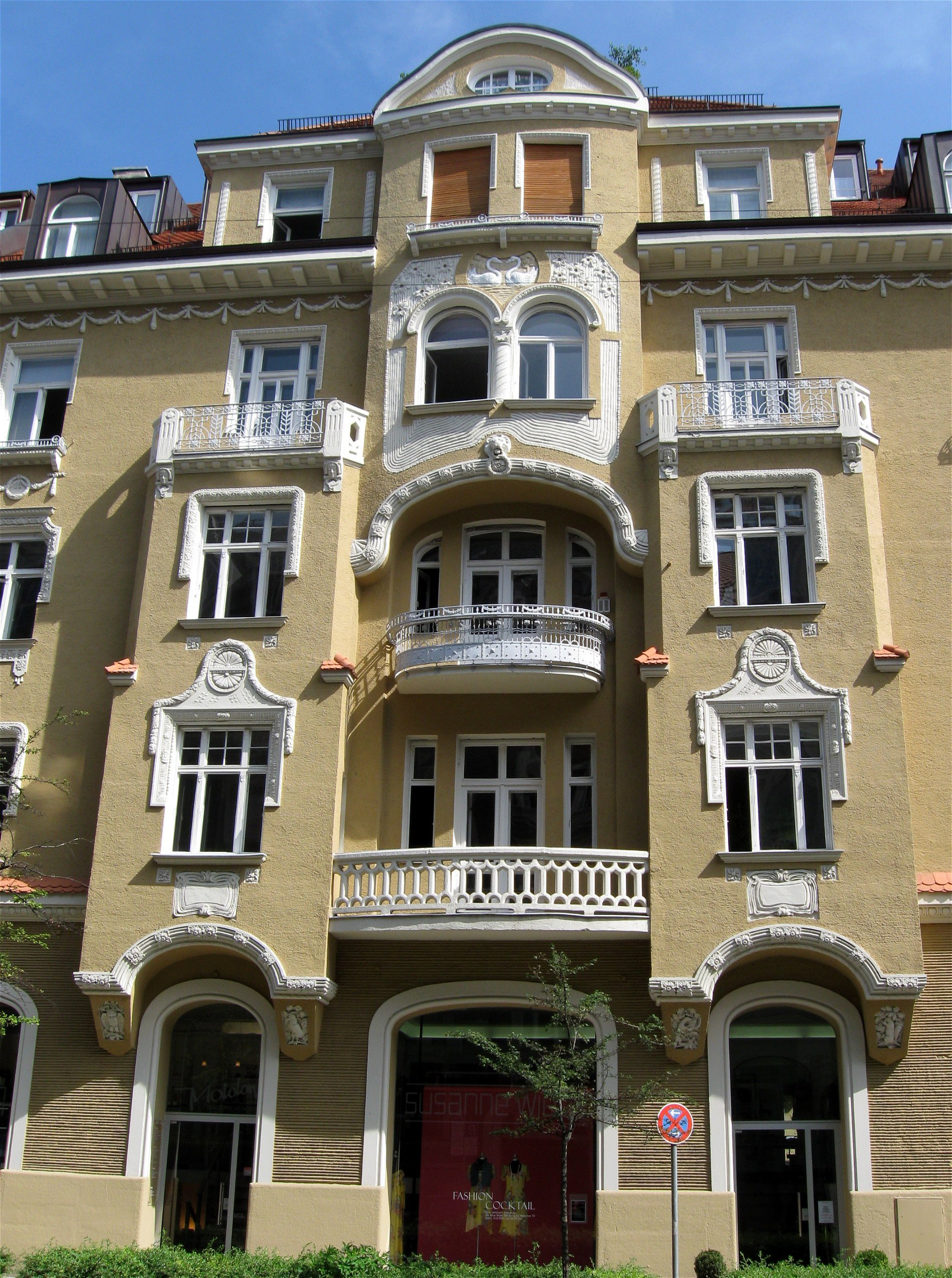
Art Nouveau building at Martiusstraße 5

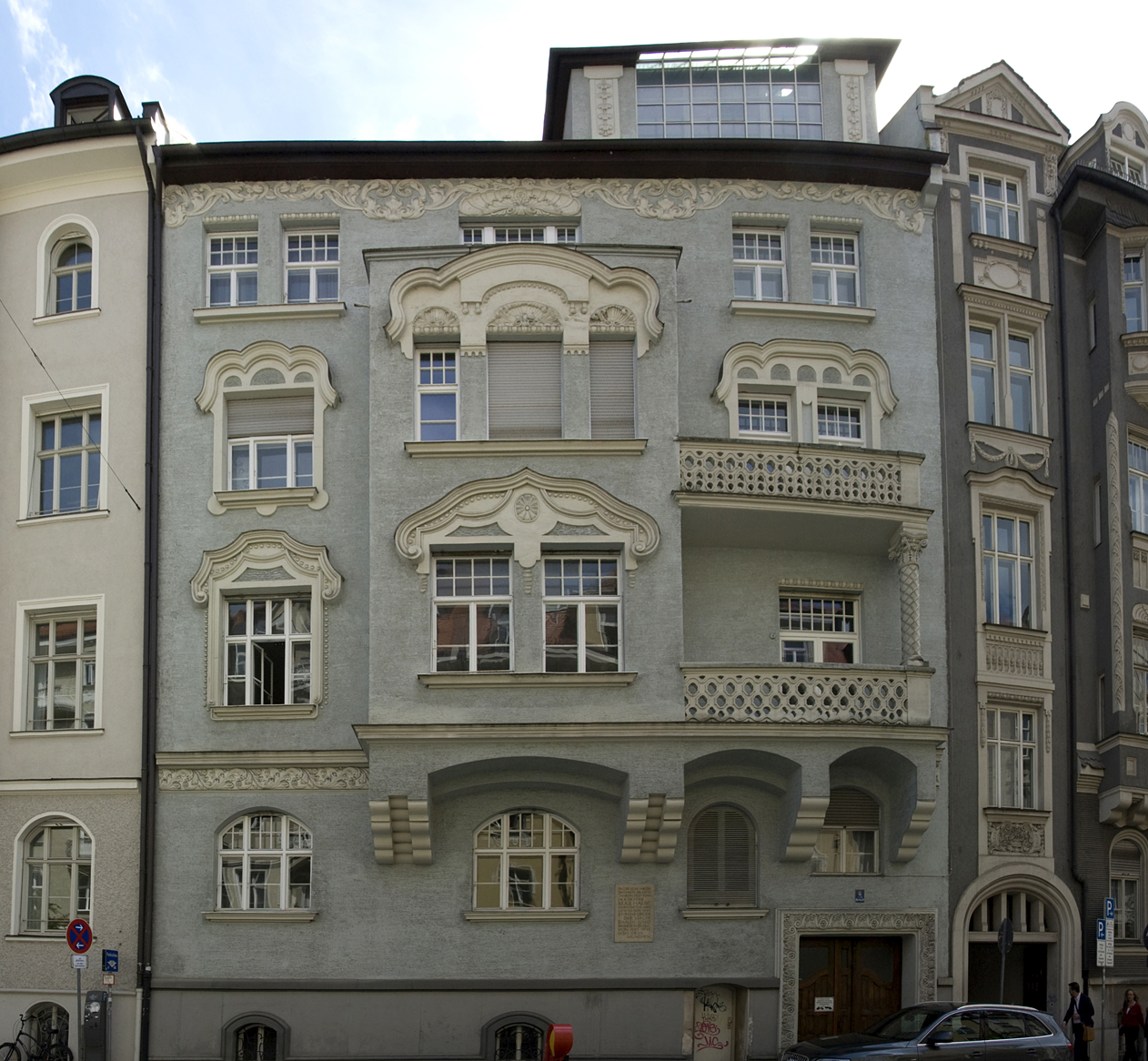
Built in 1906–07 by Franz Popp at Martiusstraße 6; 1937-44 dwelling house of the poet Max Halbe

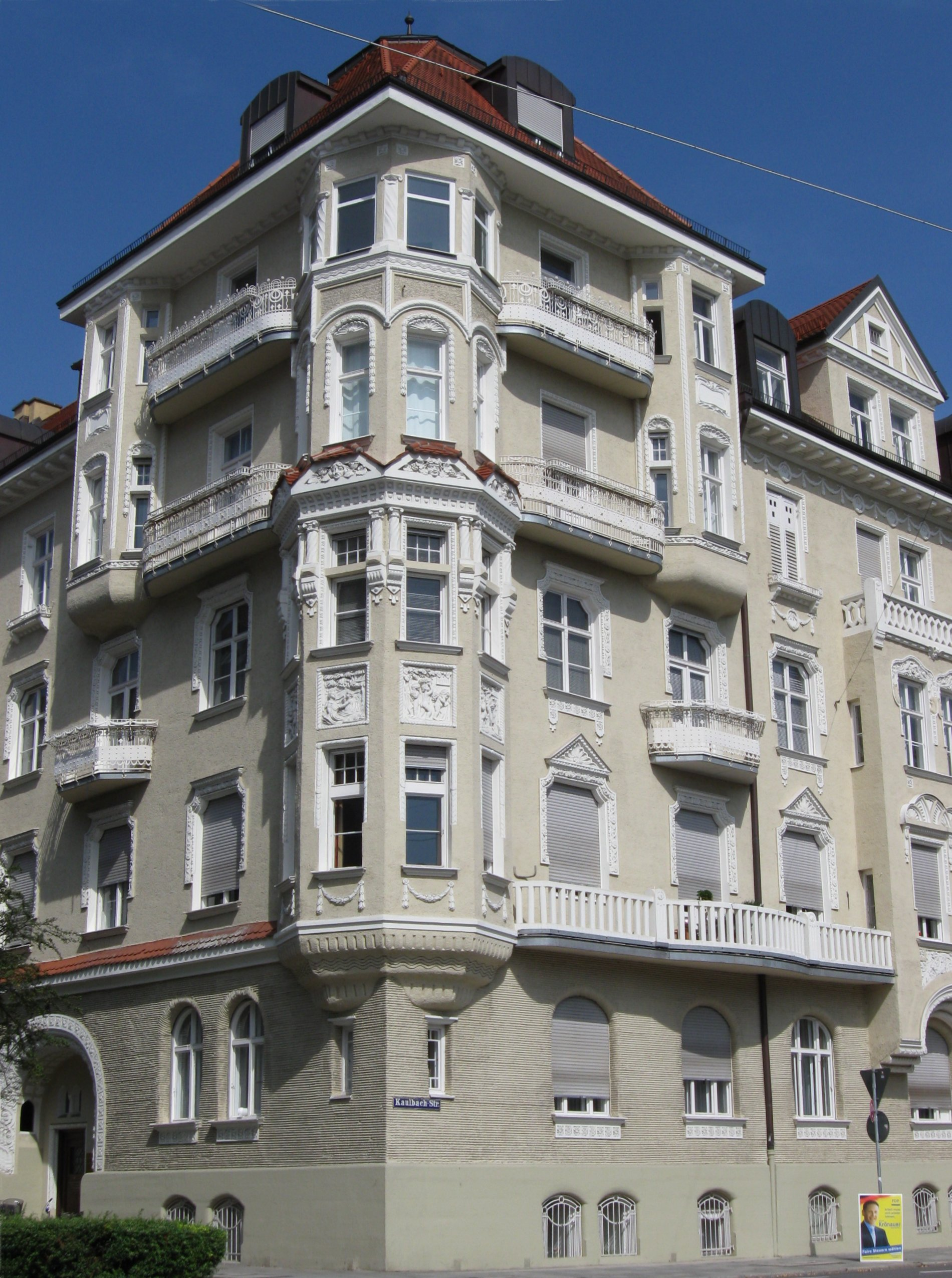
Art Nouveau building at Martiusstraße 7, where the gallery Otto Stangls was located from 1948 to 1962

== Transportation ==
The Metrobus line 54, the night bus lines 43 and 44, as well as the bus lines 150 and 154, lead in both directions through the Martiusstraße. Already since the 1990s, a tram line through the Martiusstraße came into discussion and was intended to pass by the Kurfürstenplatz through Martiusstraße into the Englischer Garten (English garden) at the Chinesischer Turm (Chinese tower) and would therefore create a northern tangent between Neuhausen and Bogenhausen. The garden tram was to be operated, according to the request of the city of Munich, with batteries in order avoid having overhead lines in the Englischer Garten, the Free State of Bavaria as a landowner of the Englischer Garten rejected the tram connection for a long time. The final decision for the construction is still pending.

== Famous residents ==
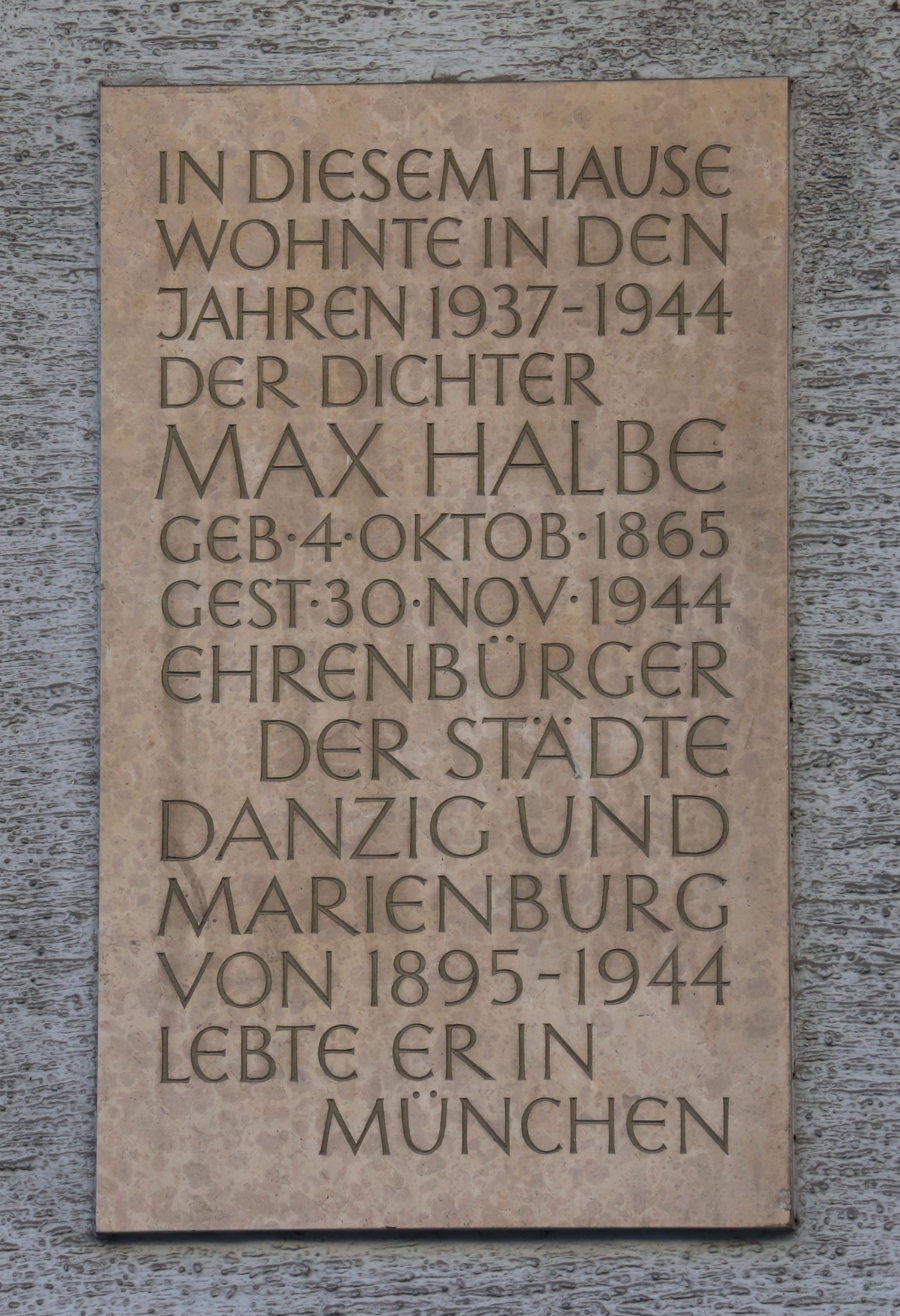
Commemorative plaque for Max Halbe on house No. 6

The zoologist and evolutionary biologist, Richard Semon, lived from 1907 onward at Martiusstraße 7. From 1937 to 1944, the poet Max Halbe lived at Martiusstraße 6. Max Mayrshofer had his studio on Martiusstraße from 1911 to 1944. The writer, Josef Ponten, also lived at Martiusstraße 7, together with his wife, the painter Julia Ponten von Broich (1880–1947).

Otto Stangl and his wife Etta founded the Modern Gallery Etta and Otto Stangl, in 1948 on an upper floor on Martiusstraße 7, which existed there with their offices until 1962 and was one of the most important meeting places of avant-garde artists in Munich. Accordingly, the founding of the group ZEN 49, a group of seven German artists, took place in Stangl's gallery in 1949.

When two police officers tried to prevent five young guitarists from making music on the corner of Martiusstraße and Leopoldstraße on the night of 21 June 1962, this resulted in street riot between approximately 40,000 people, mainly youth protesters and partially mounted policemen, which later became known as the Schwabing riots in the history books.

Martiusstraße has also found its place in the novel, Doctor Faustus, by Thomas Mann. In the late work of Thomas Mann, he described since 1919 at Dr. Sixtus Kridwiß, a graphic artist, taking place Herrenabend in Martiusstraße. Emil Preetorius was Thomas Mann's role model for the figure of Kridwiß.
