= Cikánský dolík =

Fen in Bílichov, Czech Republic

- IUCN category IV (habitat/species management area)
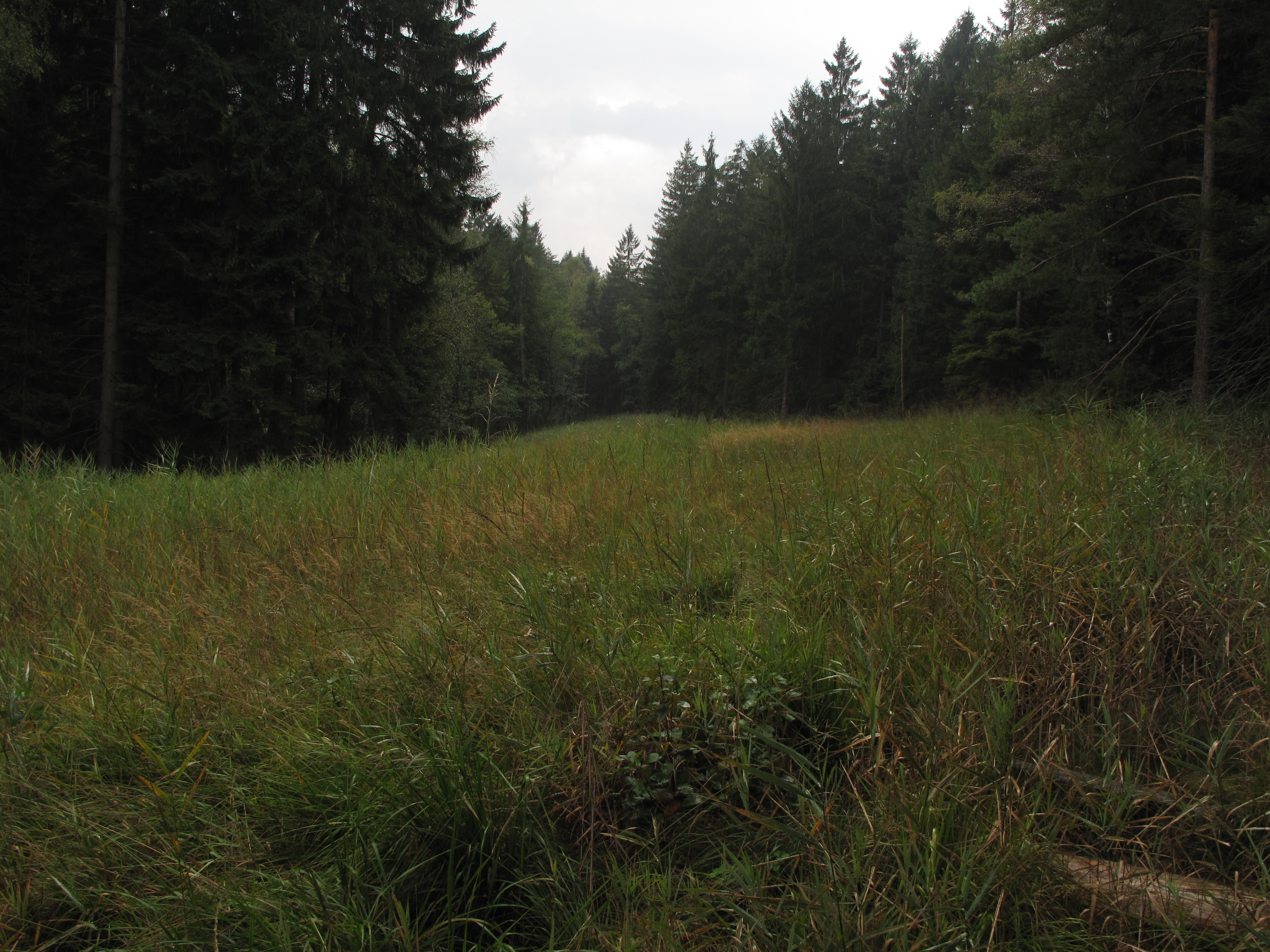
- General view

- Location within Czech Republic
- Location: Bílichov, Central Bohemian Region, Czech Republic
- Coordinates: 50°16′15″N 13°53′51″E
- Area: 0.646 ha (1.60 acres)
- Max. elevation: 376 m (1,234 ft)
- Min. elevation: 370 m (1,210 ft)
- Established: 29 September 1987
- Operator: AOPK ČR

Cikánský dolík is a fen in the municipality of Bílichov in the Central Bohemian Region of the Czech Republic. It is protected as a national nature monument.

== Geography ==
Cikánský dolík is located in the Džbán range in the municipal territory of Bílichov, 1.5 kilometres (0.9 mi) northwest of the village of Bílichov and about 38 km (24 mi) northwest of Prague. The brook Samotínský potok flows through the area. It has been designated a protected area since 1987, and since 1994 it has been protected as a national nature monument. The national nature monument has an area of 0.65 ha (1.6 acres) and lies at an altitude of 370–376 m above sea level.

== Flora ==
Cikánský dolík is a naturally formed wet meadow, surrounded on all sides by forest. Many protected plant species occur here. The main reason for protection is the occurrence of thesium rostratum, for which this is the only locality of occurrence in the Czech Republic, and of schoenus nigricans, for which this is one of two localities of occurrence in the country.

Most of the area periodically dries out, which is why the purple moor-grass and the heath false brome are dominant plant species here.

== Fauna ==
From the point of view of nature conservation, the most important animal species in the area are the alpine newt, the keeled skimmer, and the golden-ringed dragonfly.

== Geology and pedology ==
The bedrock consists of Cretaceous sandy-limestone marls, located on glauconitic marls and sandstones. The soil is strongly calcareous.
