= Mican (surname) =

Mican is a Romanian and Turkish surname. Notable people with the surname include:

- Carmen Mican (born 1966), Romanian handball player and coach
- Hakan Savaş Mican (born 1978), German-Turkish filmmaker
- Kürşat Mican (born 1982), Turkish politician and author

== See also ==
- Mičan family, Bohemian noble family
