= Martianthus =

Scientific classification
- Kingdom: Plantae
- Clade: Tracheophytes
- Clade: Angiosperms
- Clade: Eudicots
- Clade: Asterids
- Order: Lamiales
- Family: Lamiaceae
- Genus: Martianthus; Harley & J.F.B.Pastore

Species of flowering plant

Martianthus is a genus of flowering plants belonging to the family Lamiaceae.

It is native to Peru and north-eastern Brazil.

The genus name of Martianthus is in honour of Carl Friedrich Philipp von Martius (1794–1868), a German botanist and explorer. It was first described and published in Phytotaxa Vol.58 on page 27 in 2012.

== Known species ==
According to Kew:

- Martianthus elongatus (Benth.) Harley & J.F.B.Pastore
- Martianthus leucocephalus (Mart. ex Benth.) J.F.B.Pastore
- Martianthus sancti-gabrielii (Harley) Harley & J.F.B.Pastore
- Martianthus stachydifolius (Epling) Harley & J.F.B.Pastore
