= Austrian expedition to Brazil =

Political and scientific mission to Brazil from Austria 1817–1835

The Austrian expedition to Brazil (German: Österreichische Brasilien-Expedition) was a scientific expedition which explored Brazil. It was organized and financed by the Austrian Empire from 1817 to 1835.

== History ==
The expedition had as its main supporter the Austrian statesman Prince Metternich and the expedition was associated with the politically significant marriage of Dom Pedro of Brazil and Archduchess Leopoldine of Austria. Overall planning was overseen by Metternich and scientific planning was undertaken by Carl Franz von Schreibers.

The contingent of fourteen naturalists included Johann Christian Mikan, Carl Friedrich Philipp von Martius, Giuseppe Raddi, Heinrich Wilhelm Schott, Johann Baptist von Spix, Johann Baptist Emanuel Pohl, Johann Natterer, Ferdinand Dominik Sochor (Imperial hunter and a skilled taxidermist) and the artists Thomas Ender and Johann Buchberger. A thirteen-room "Brazilian Museum" containing 133,000 objects from the expedition was opened to the public. It was closed in 1836 and the contents integrated with those of the Hof-Naturalienkabinette, now the Natural History Museum of Vienna.

== Sources ==
- de:Österreichische Brasilien-Expedition
