= Friedrich Mičan von Klinstein und Rostok =

Friedrich Mičan, Baron von Klinstein und Rostok in Constantinople (fl. 1569 – 1578) was a German-Bohemian nobleman.

== Biography ==
His family's origin can be traced back to over a century before his day. A Jindřich Mičan von Klinstein was active in the early 15th century; his son, and heir to his estates, Jan (Johann) died in 1503, with his own sons dividing the estates among themselves.

In 1571, he was the governor of the Kornhaus Estate, and as such attended the provincial parliament held in Prague at that time. By the end of the Thirty Years' War, the estate had passed to Heinrich Stampach.

In the middle of the 16th century, Friedrich Mičan von Klinstein und Rostok acquired almost all the Žehrovice estate, with the exception of the granary, from the Kolowrat-Bezdružický lords. This estate included the Zehrow Castle, which had been left to decay since 1506, and was described in 1550 as a deserted castle with a courtyard. In 1569, Mičan bought the rest of the granary for 5,875 shock Czech pennies from the brothers Jan and Zdislav Abdon Kolowrat-Bezdružický.

In 1578, he sold parts of Čelechovic estate to Georg Borzita von Martinitz, who in 1595 bought the rest from his heirs.

A Friedrich Mičan von Klinstein is later mentioned as Imperial Councilor. In 1613 this Mičan was owed 33,000 shock Czech pennies of debts, and as a result of his debtors' inability to pay off their debts, he came into the possession of the Rischburg Estate. After his death, this estate was inherited by his son Albrecht Mičan von Klinstein, who then passed it on to his wife Magdalena Mičan (née von Hodkowa).

He was Baron of Klinstein and Rostock in Constantinople.
