= Mšec =

- Market town
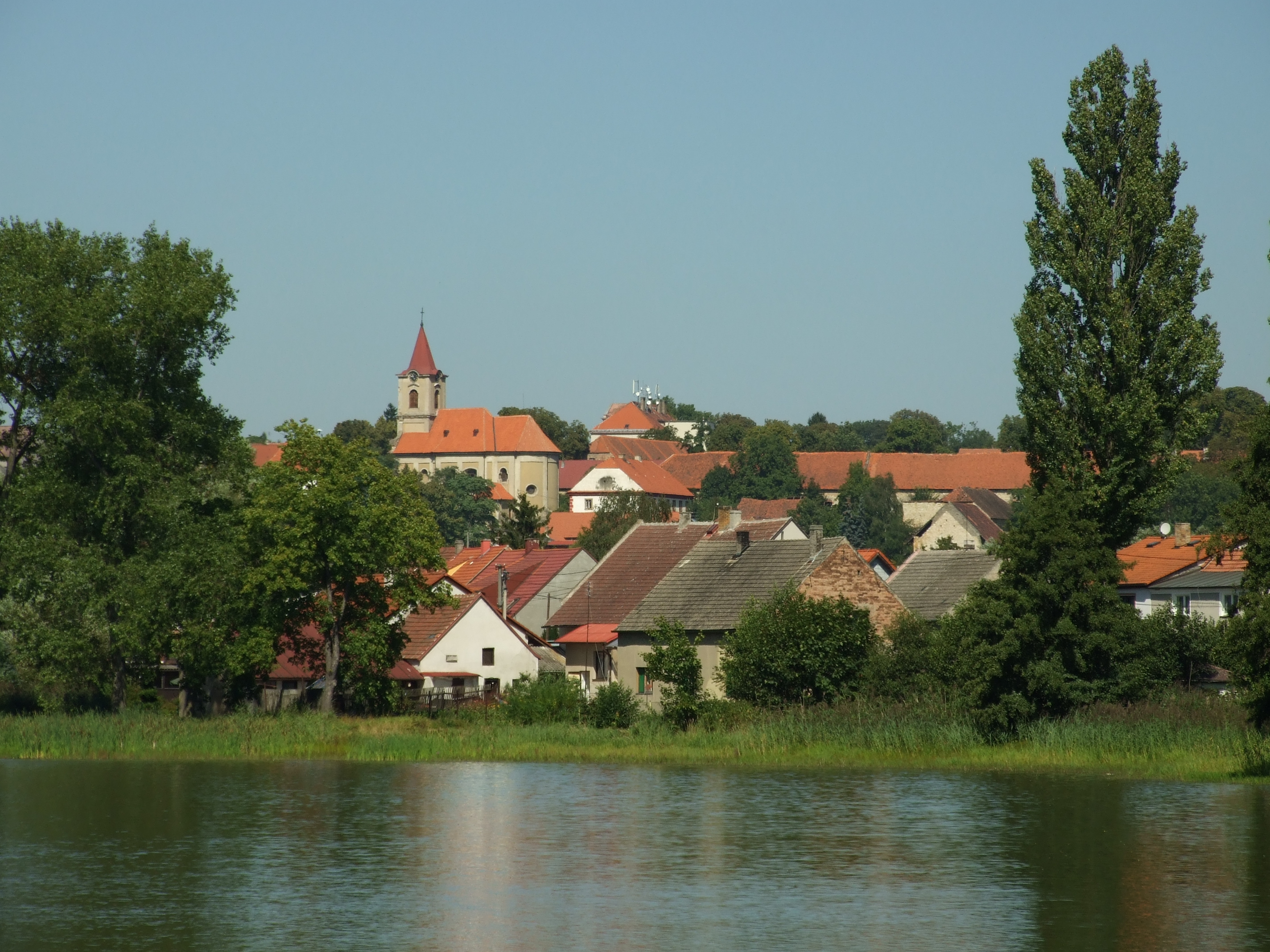
- View from the south

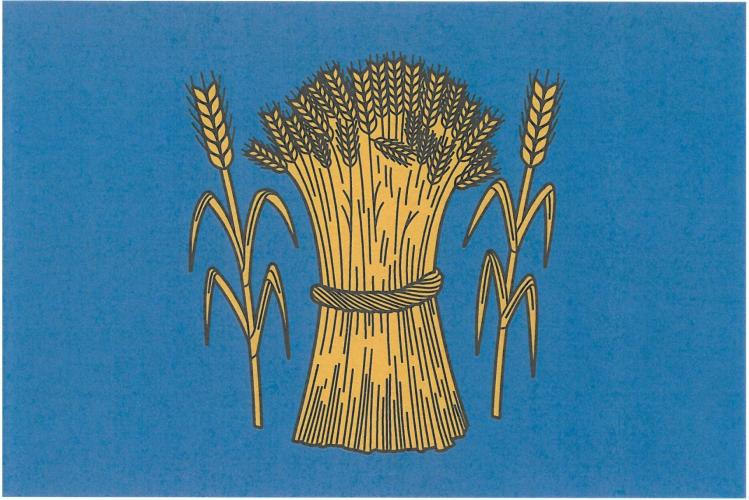
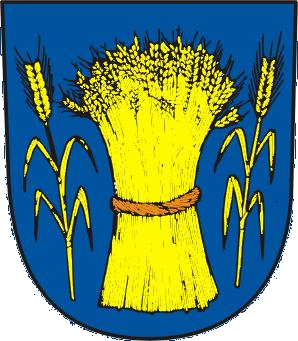
- Flag Coat of arms

- Location in the Czech Republic
- Coordinates: 50°12′19″N 13°53′54″E
- Country: Czech Republic
- Region: Central Bohemian
- District: Rakovník
- First mentioned: 1316

Area
  - Total: 14.20 km^{2} (5.48 sq mi)
- Elevation: 435 m (1,427 ft)

Population (2026-01-01)
  - Total: 879
  - Density: 61.9/km^{2} (160/sq mi)
- Time zone: UTC+1 (CET)
  - Summer (DST): UTC+2 (CEST)
- Postal code: 270 64
- Website: www.obecmsec.cz

Mšec (Czech pronunciation: [ˈmʃɛts]; German: Kornhaus) is a market town in Rakovník District in the Central Bohemian Region of the Czech Republic. It has about 900 inhabitants.

== Etymology ==
The name is derived from the Czech word mšec (diminutive from mech), meaning 'small moss'.

== Geography ==
Mšec is located about 15 kilometres (9 mi) northwest of Kladno and 34 km (21 mi) northwest of Prague. It lies in the Džbán range. The highest point is at 466 m (1,529 ft) above sea level. The Loděnice River flows through the southern part of the territory and supplies a system of several fishponds there.

== History ==
The first written mention of Mšec is from 1316. Albrecht the Elder of Kolowrat had built here a fortress in 1361, but it was destroyed already in 1388. In 1548, Mšec was first referred to as a market town. With a short break in 1536–1538, the Kolowrat family owned Mšec until 1569. It was then property of the families of Mičan and Štampach. The greatest development occurred during the rule of Matyáš Štampach, who had built here a school in 1601 and had rebuilt the castle.

After the Battle of White Mountain, properties of the Štampach family were confiscated. From 1662, Mšec was continuously owned by the Schwarzenberg family.

== Demographics ==
Historical population

Year	Pop.	±%
1869	1,179	—
1880	1,177	−0.2%
1890	1,209	+2.7%
1900	1,083	−10.4%
1910	1,165	+7.6%

Year	Pop.	±%
1921	1,163	−0.2%
1930	1,057	−9.1%
1950	999	−5.5%
1961	992	−0.7%
1970	867	−12.6%

Year	Pop.	±%
1980	826	−4.7%
1991	810	−1.9%
2001	828	+2.2%
2011	867	+4.7%
2021	874	+0.8%

Source: Censuses

== Transport ==
The I/16 road, which connects the D6 motorway with Slaný and Mělník, runs through the market town.

== Sights ==
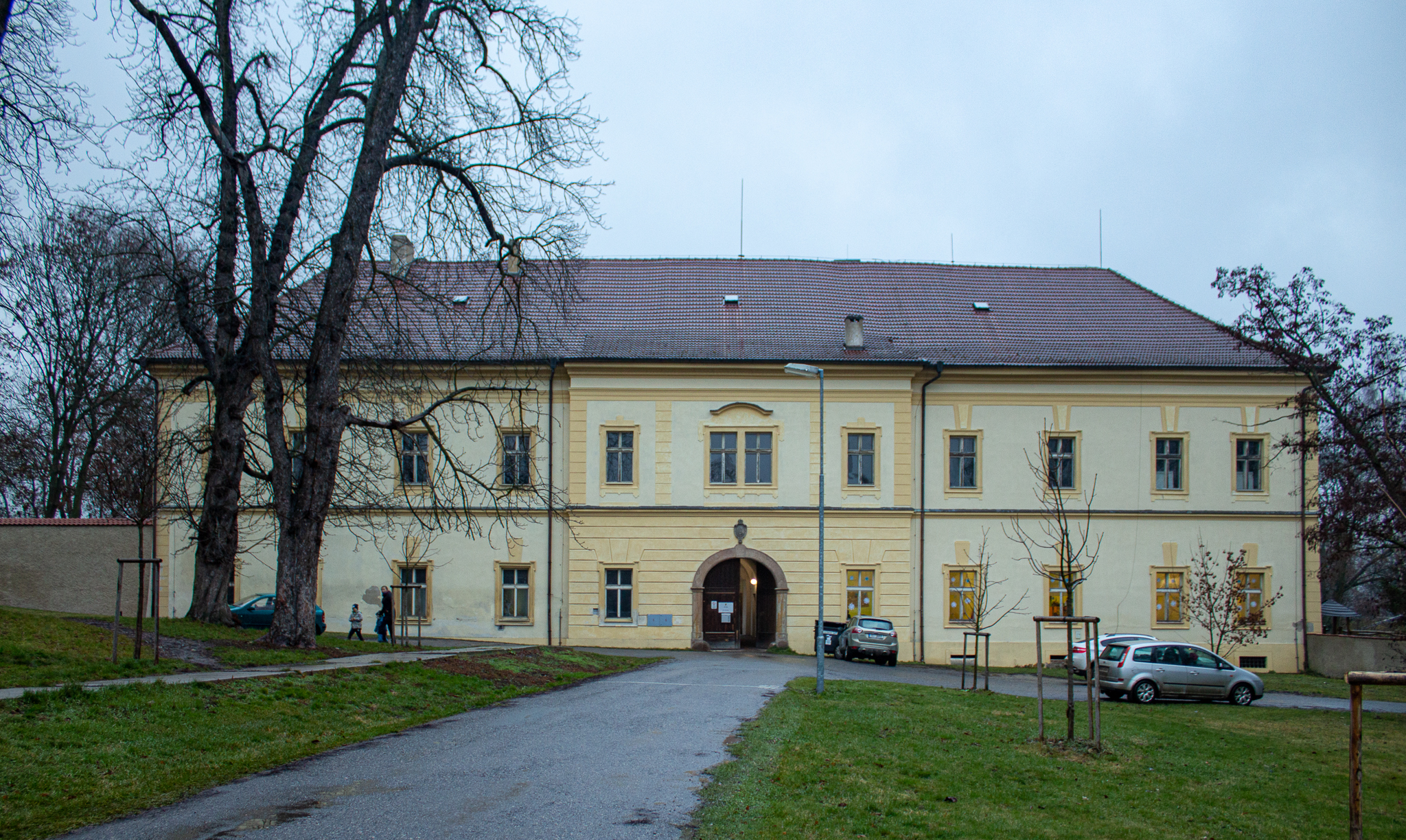
Mšec Castle

The main landmark of Mšec is the Church of Saint Catherine of Alexandria. It is a late Baroque building from 1780, which replaced an old Gothic church.

The Mšec Castle was built in the late Renaissance style at the turn of the 16th and 17th centuries, then it was rebuilt in the Baroque style in several stages in the 18th century. Neoclassical modifications were made in the 19th century. Next to the castle is a park.
