= Joseph Natterer =

Austrian ornithologist (1786–1852)

Joseph Natterer (7 October 1786 – 28 June 1852) was an Austrian ornithologist at the Vienna natural history museum. He was the older brother of Johann Natterer and the son of royal falconer Joseph Natterer Sr. (1754–1823). His sons Johann August Natterer (1821–1900) and Josef Natterer (1819–1862) were pioneers of photography.

== Life ==
Natterer was born in Laxenburg to the royal falconer Joseph Natterer Sr. (1754–1823) and Maria Anna Theresia Schober. Trained by his father to observe, collect and preserve specimens. He began to work as an assistant to Karl von Schreibers at the Imperial Cabinet for Naturalia (Hofnaturalienkabinett) in Vienna in 1806. He became a curator in 1810. He worked extensively on the collections but did not publish much on his own. He examined the collections made by his brother Johann from South America.
