= Gezeli-ye Sofla =

Gezeli-ye Sofla گزلي سفلي
- Village
- Location within Iran
- Coordinates: 30°51′32″N 49°19′26″E
- Country: Iran
- Province: Khuzestan
- County: Ramshir
- Bakhsh: Central
- Rural District: Abdoliyeh-ye Sharqi

Population (2006)
  - Total: 57
- Time zone: UTC+3:30 (IRST)
  - Summer (DST): UTC+4:30 (IRDT)

Gezeli-ye Sofla (Persian: گزلي سفلي, also Romanized as Gezelī-ye Soflá; also known as Gezelī-ye Pā’īn) is a village in Abdoliyeh-ye Sharqi Rural District, in the Central District of Ramshir County, Khuzestan Province, Iran. At the 2006 census, its population was 57, in 11 families.
