= Mšecké Žehrovice =

- Municipality
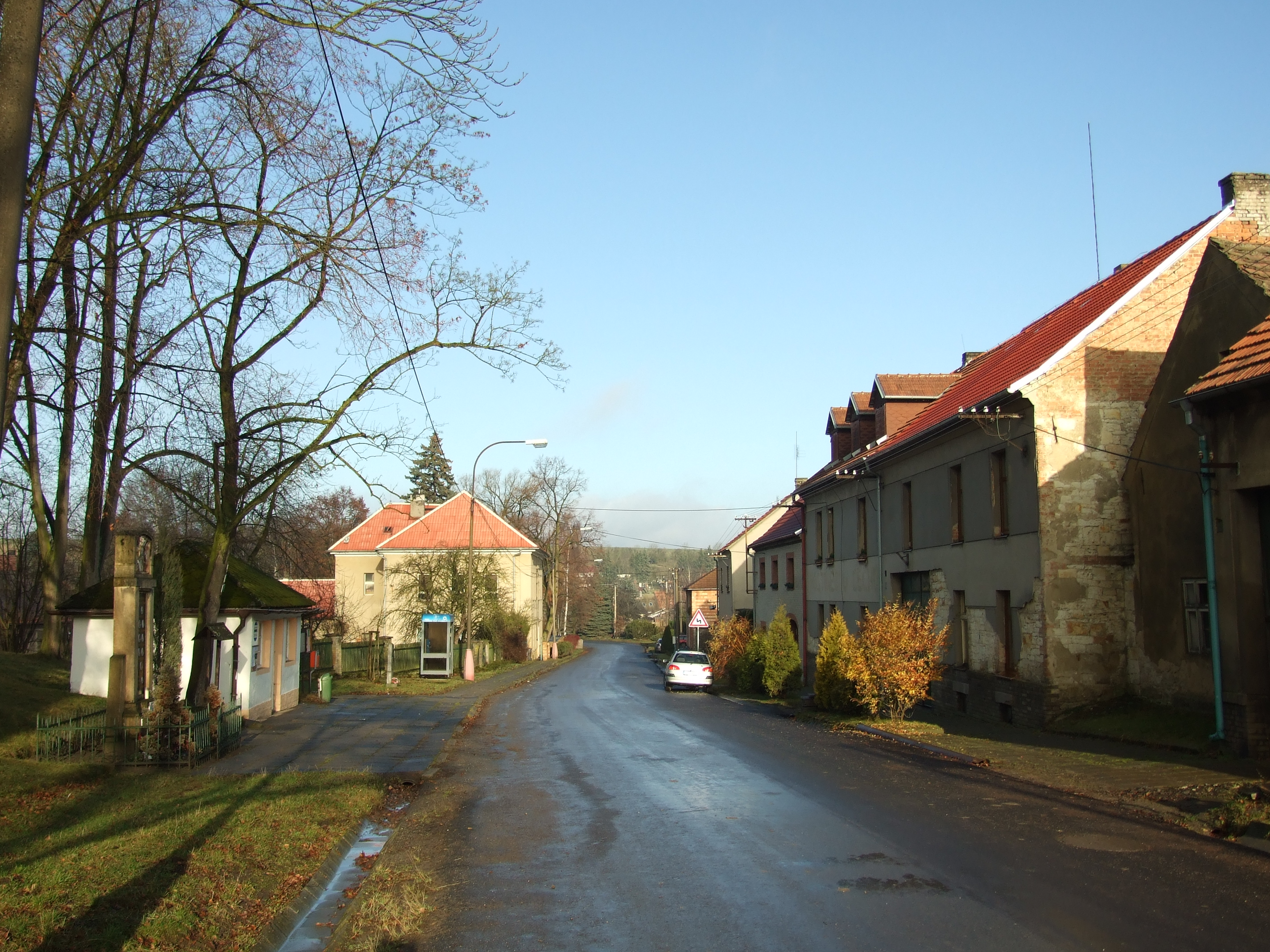
- Main street

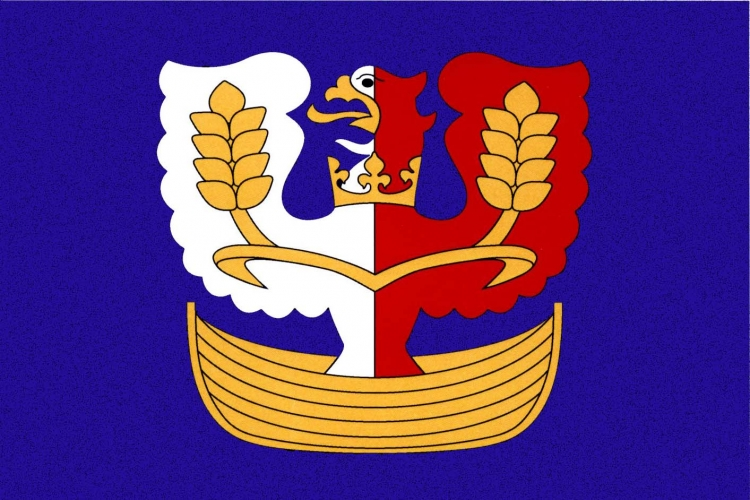
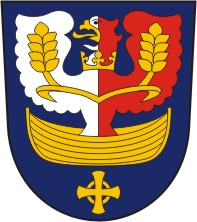
- Flag Coat of arms

- Location in the Czech Republic
- Coordinates: 50°10′45″N 13°55′24″E
- Country: Czech Republic
- Region: Central Bohemian
- District: Rakovník
- First mentioned: 1045

Area
  - Total: 14.05 km^{2} (5.42 sq mi)
- Elevation: 413 m (1,355 ft)

Population (2026-01-01)
  - Total: 664
  - Density: 47.3/km^{2} (122/sq mi)
- Time zone: UTC+1 (CET)
  - Summer (DST): UTC+2 (CEST)
- Postal code: 270 64
- Website: www.msecke-zehrovice.cz

Mšecké Žehrovice (German: Kornhaus Scherowitz) is a municipality and village in Rakovník District in the Central Bohemian Region of the Czech Republic. It has about 700 inhabitants.

== Administrative division ==
Mšecké Žehrovice consists of two municipal parts (in brackets population according to the 2021 census):

- Mšecké Žehrovice (494)
- Lodenice (132)

== Etymology ==
The name Žehrovice is derived from the personal name Žehra, meaning "the village of Žehra's people". The prefix Mšecké is derived from Mšec, to which Žehrovice belonged for some time.

== Geography ==
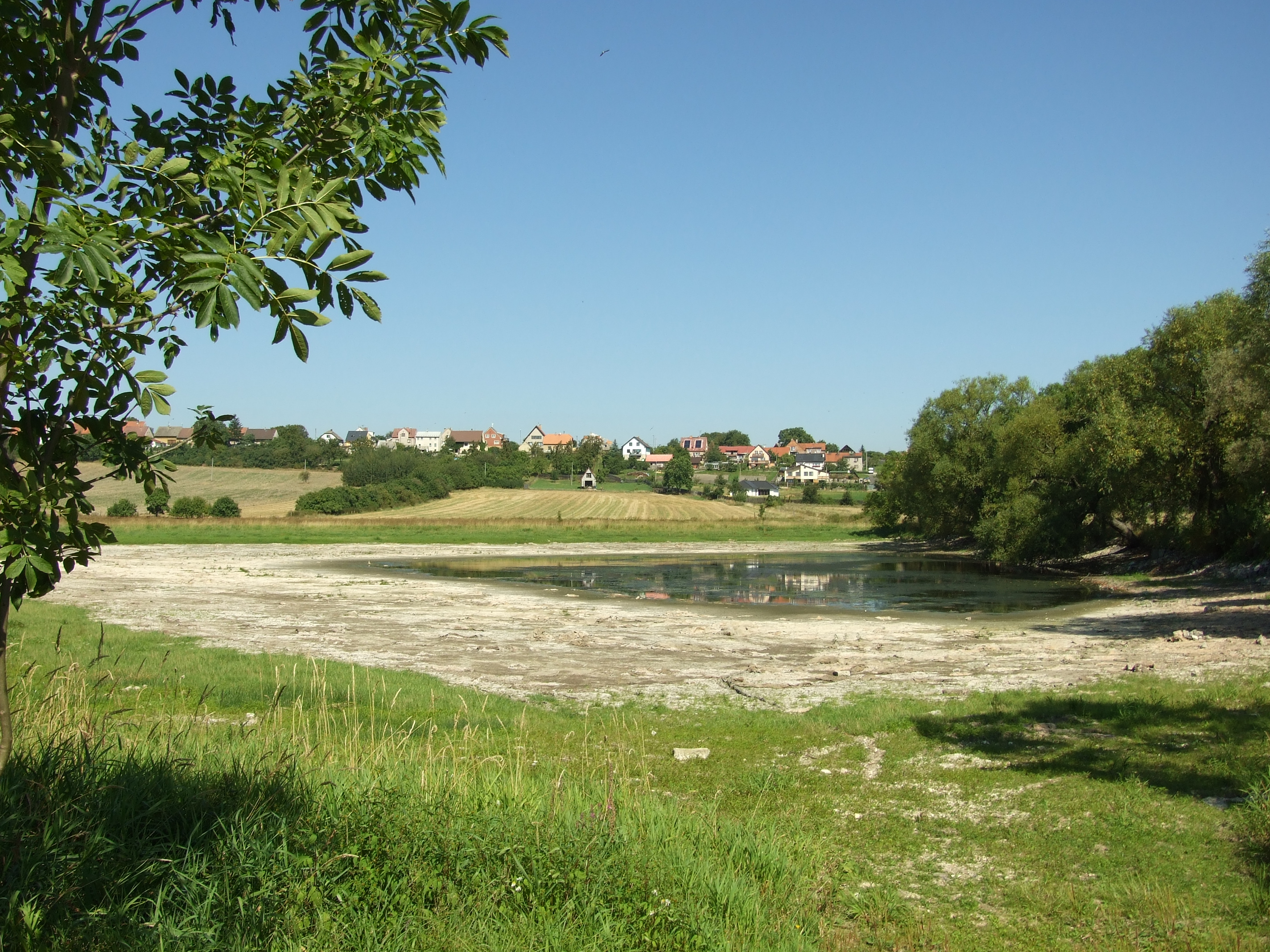
View from the south

Mšecké Žehrovice is located about 16 kilometres (10 mi) northeast of Rakovník and 30 km (19 mi) northwest of Prague. It lies in the Džbán range. The highest point is the Kopanina hill at 466 m (1,529 ft) above sea level. The Loděnice River flows through the village of Lodenice and supplies the fishpond Loděnický rybník. The village of Mšecké Žehrovice is surrounded by many small fishponds that are fed by the streams Žehrovický potok and Novodvorský potok.

Mšecké Žehrovice is located in the Džbán Nature Park. The Louky v oboře Libeň Nature Reserve is situated within the Libeň deer park in the southern part of the municipality. It has an area of 9.5 ha (23 acres) and is protected because of its rich flora.

== History ==
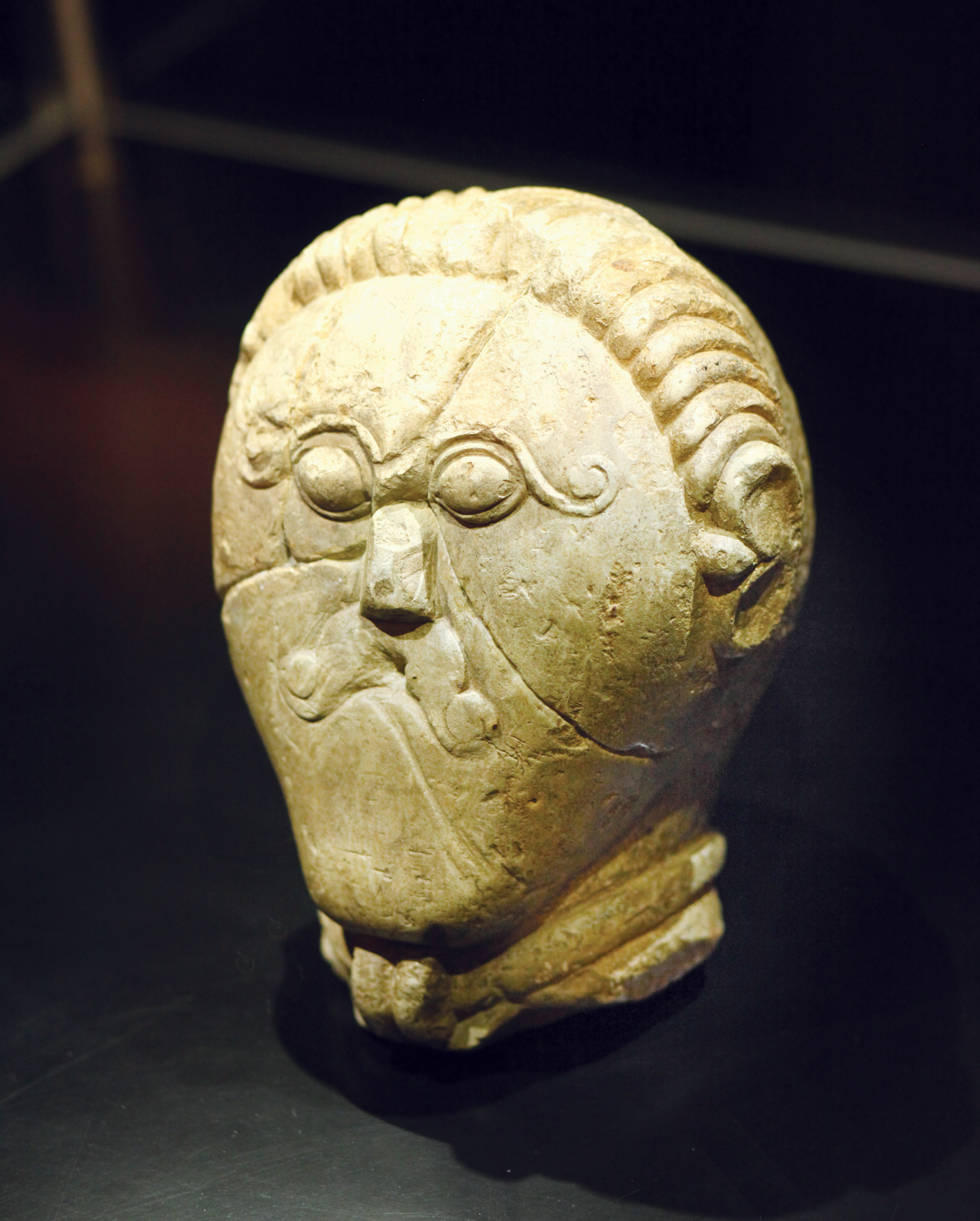
The Mšecké Žehrovice Head, discovered in 1943

The location of today's Mšecké Žehrovice has been inhabited since the period of the Knovíz culture in the Late Bronze Age, 13–10 centuries BC. Archaeological findings also confirmed the settlement from the late Hallstatt period. The most important finds come from the La Tène culture, including the Mšecké Žehrovice Head, which is a stone head from the 2nd–3rd century BC discovered in 1943.

The first written mention of Žehrovice was in 1045, when Duke Bretislav I left part of the village to the Břevnov Monastery. At the beginning of the 13th century, the administrator of the royal portion tried to subdue the subjects of the monastic portion, but they left Žehrovice. In 1224, King Ottokar I of Bohemia granted the monastery a protective privilege for the monastic part of Žehrovice. The deed from 1224 is also the first written mention of the newly established village of Lodenice, founded be the people who left Žehrovice.

In 1361, the Kolowrat family acquired Žehrovice and a branch of the family that called itself Žehrovický of Kolowrat arose here. In the 14th and 15th centuries, the Žehrov Fortress stood here, which was the seat of the family. In 1506, Mikuláš Žehrovický of Kolowrat annexed Žehrovice to the Mšec estate and it was renamed Mšecké Žehrovice. Since then, the fortress fell into disrepair, and in 1549 it was described as abandoned. The Kolowrat family owned Žehrovice until the second half of the 16th century.

Until 1622, Mšecké Žehrovice and Lodenice were owned by the Knights of Štampach. After the Battle of White Mountain, their properties were confiscated and Mšecké Žehrovice was bought by the Fürstenberg family. During the Thirty Years' War, Lodenice was completely destroyed, but was later restored. In 1662, the Fürstenbergs sold the estate to the Schwarzenberg family, who owned it until the establishment of an independent municipalities of Mšecké Žehrovice and Lodenice in 1850. In 1976, Lodenice was incorporated into Mšecké Žehrovice.

== Demographics ==
Historical population

Year	Pop.	±%
1869	728	—
1880	766	+5.2%
1890	731	−4.6%
1900	747	+2.2%
1910	802	+7.4%

Year	Pop.	±%
1921	875	+9.1%
1930	882	+0.8%
1950	749	−15.1%
1961	674	−10.0%
1970	631	−6.4%

Year	Pop.	±%
1980	570	−9.7%
1991	484	−15.1%
2001	470	−2.9%
2011	528	+12.3%
2021	626	+18.6%

Source: Censuses

== Economy ==
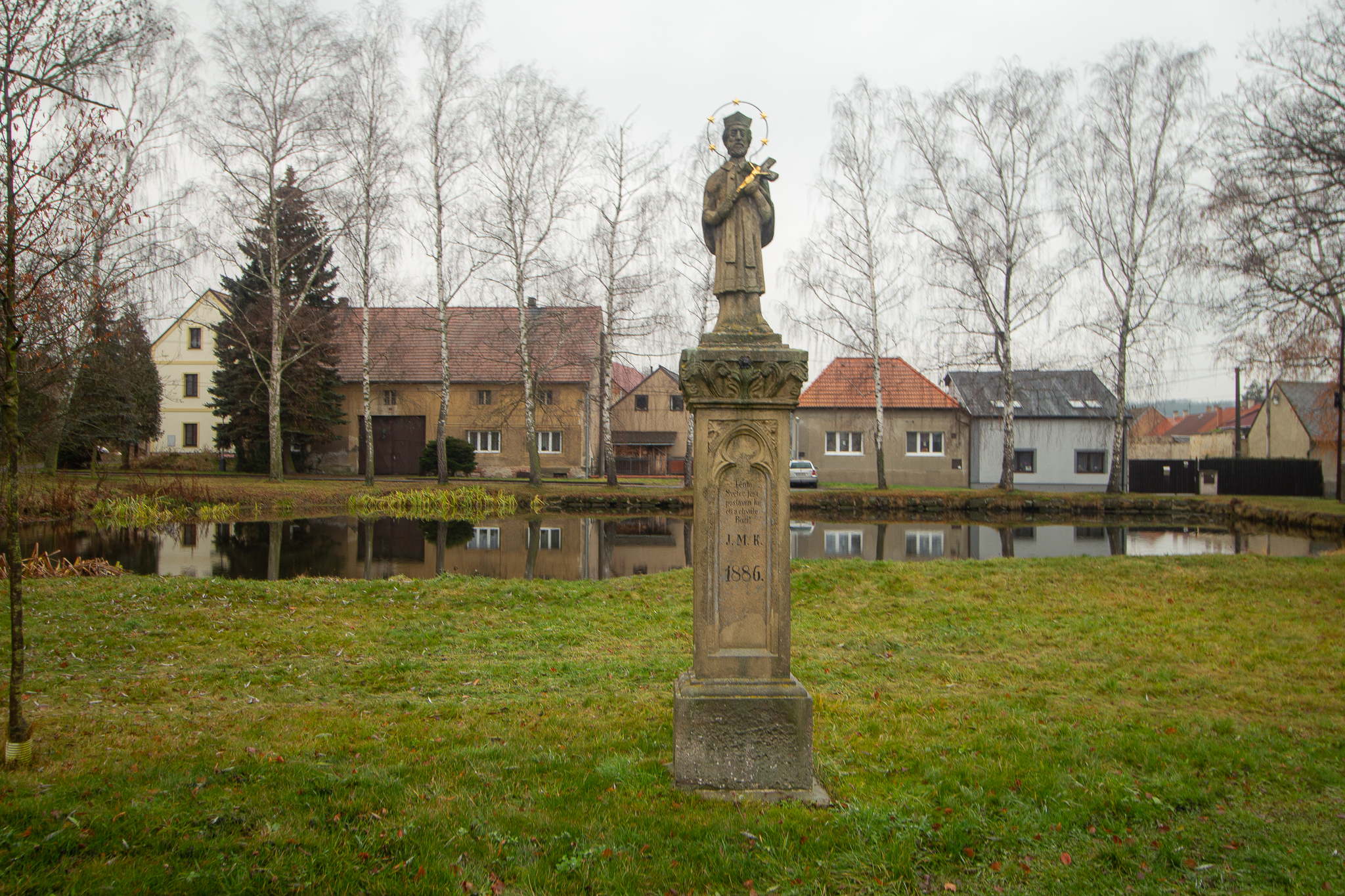
Statue of St. John of Nepomuk

Mšecké Žehrovice is known for growing hops.

== Transport ==
There are no railways or major roads passing through the municipality. The D6 motorway (part of the European route E48) runs just beyond the southern municipal border.

== Sights ==
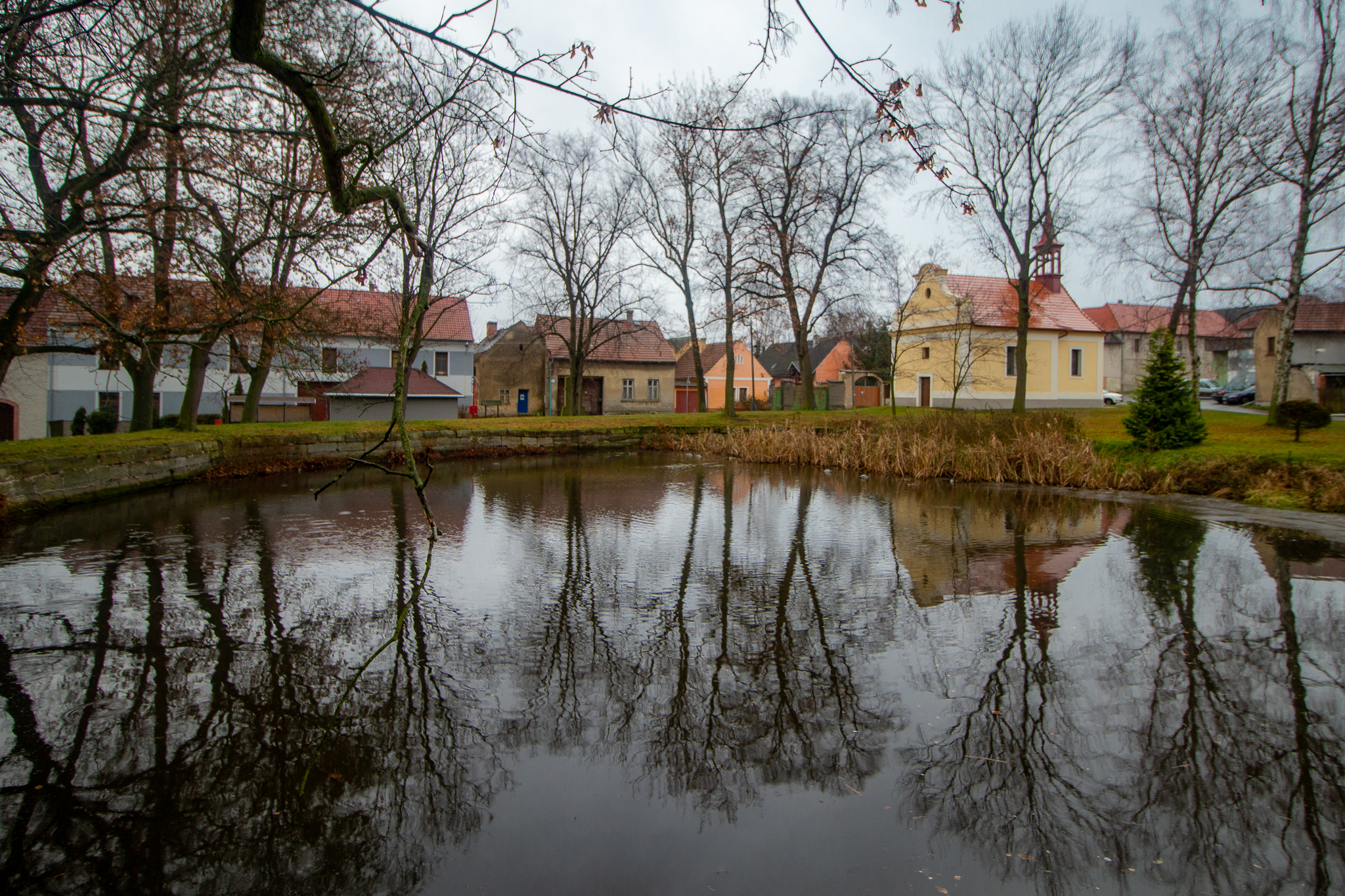
View towards the Church of Saint Martin

The main landmark of Mšecké Žehrovice is the Church of Saint Martin. It is a small rural Baroque building from 1774.

The municipality is known for its archaeological site. The life of the Celts in the area is covered by an educational trail that passes near the site. The area of the Viereckschanze is protected as a cultural monument.

A landmark is the 400-year-old European beech tree. It is the oldest tree in Rakovník District. It has a trunk circumference of 5.30 m (17.4 ft) and a height of 14 m (46 ft). It has been protected since 1978. Its crown reaches a diameter of 26 m (85 ft).
