= Mikanic =

- Origin: Cape Town, South Africa
- Genres: Rock
- Years active: 2003 – Present
- Labels: Unsigned
- Members: Mike Rennie; Nick Turner; Yasuhito Sasaki; Shirzad Khusrokhan; Alex Beckmann
- Website: http://www.mikanic.com/

Mikanic is a South African rock group.

== History ==
Mikanic was formed in 2003, with Michael Rennie on violin and vocals and Nick Turner on acoustic guitar and vocals. Both musicians were already well known on the South African music scene having founded Sons of Trout. With Sons of Trout they headlined every major music festival in the country and toured extensively, releasing four albums and opening for a number of international artists.

In 2004 Mikanic released its first album, Swimming with the Women. The album crossed musical boundaries, established Mikanic's characteristic sound, and provided the springboard for their departure to the USA. Now based in New York, Mikanic's line-up features musicians from Japan (Yasuhito Sasaki on lead guitar), India (Shirzad Khusrokhan on bass) and the USA (Alex Beckmann on drums).

Mikanic's music spans genres with influences ranging from rock, reggae and African to hip-hop and jazz. Lyrically powerful, relevant, humorous and energetic, the music has a wide appeal. With shows that feature virtuosic musicianship, funky grooves and catchy tunes, Mikanic has quickly become one of New York's hottest live acts.

In June 2005, upon returning from tours in the UK and South Africa, Mikanic released a second album, The Subway Tracks, showcasing the diversity and the instant appeal of their sound. Mikanic also toured Japan with great success. Among other shows, the band played sold-out concerts at Sweet Basil and Mandala in Tokyo and at Olive Hall in Takamatsu, collaborating with some of Japan's biggest stars, and appearing live on radio and TV.

Mikanic has played many of New York City's legendary venues including CBGB's, Ace of Clubs and The Knitting Factory. They have also performed at the UN, Lincoln Center and at 9/11 memorial services held at Ground Zero in 2004 and 2005.

== Discography ==
=== Albums ===
- The Subway Tracks (2005)
- Swimming with the Women (2002)

=== Singles ===
- Sweet Radio (2005)
