= Qəzli, Ismailli =

Qəzli
- Location within Azerbaijan
- Coordinates: 40°47′04″N 48°06′43″E
- Country: Azerbaijan
- Rayon: Ismailli
- Municipality: Mican
- Time zone: UTC+4 (AZT)
  - Summer (DST): UTC+5 (AZT)

Qəzli (also, Gazli and Kozly) is a village in the Ismailli Rayon of Azerbaijan. The village forms part of the municipality of Mican.
