= Joseph Gottfried Mikan =

Austrian-Czech botanist (1743–1814)

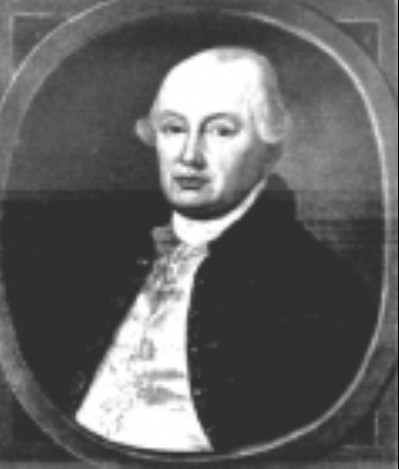
Joseph Gottfried Mikan

Joseph Gottfried Mikan (3 September 1743 – 7 August 1814) was an Austrian-Czech botanist. He was the father of zoologist Johann Christian Mikan (1769–1844).

== Life and career ==
Mikan was born on 3 September 1743 in Česká Lípa, Bohemia. He was a student in Dresden, Prague and Vienna, and served as a spa physician in Teplice. In 1773, he became an associate professor, and two years later was appointed a full professor of botany and chemistry at the University of Prague. In 1798 he became rector of the university.

He was the author of Catalogus plantarum omnium (1776), which he dedicated to the botanical garden in Prague. The plant genus Mikania from the family Asteraceae is named after him.
