= Mican =

- Municipality
- Location within Azerbaijan
- Coordinates: 40°47′36″N 48°07′53″E
- Country: Azerbaijan
- Rayon: Ismailli

Population
  - Total: 2,996
- Time zone: UTC+4 (AZT)
  - Summer (DST): UTC+5 (AZT)

Mican (also, Midzhakend and Midzhan) is a village and municipality in the Ismailli Rayon of Azerbaijan. It has a population of 2,996. The municipality consists of the villages of Mican and Qəzli.
