= Žerotín (Olomouc District) =

- Municipality
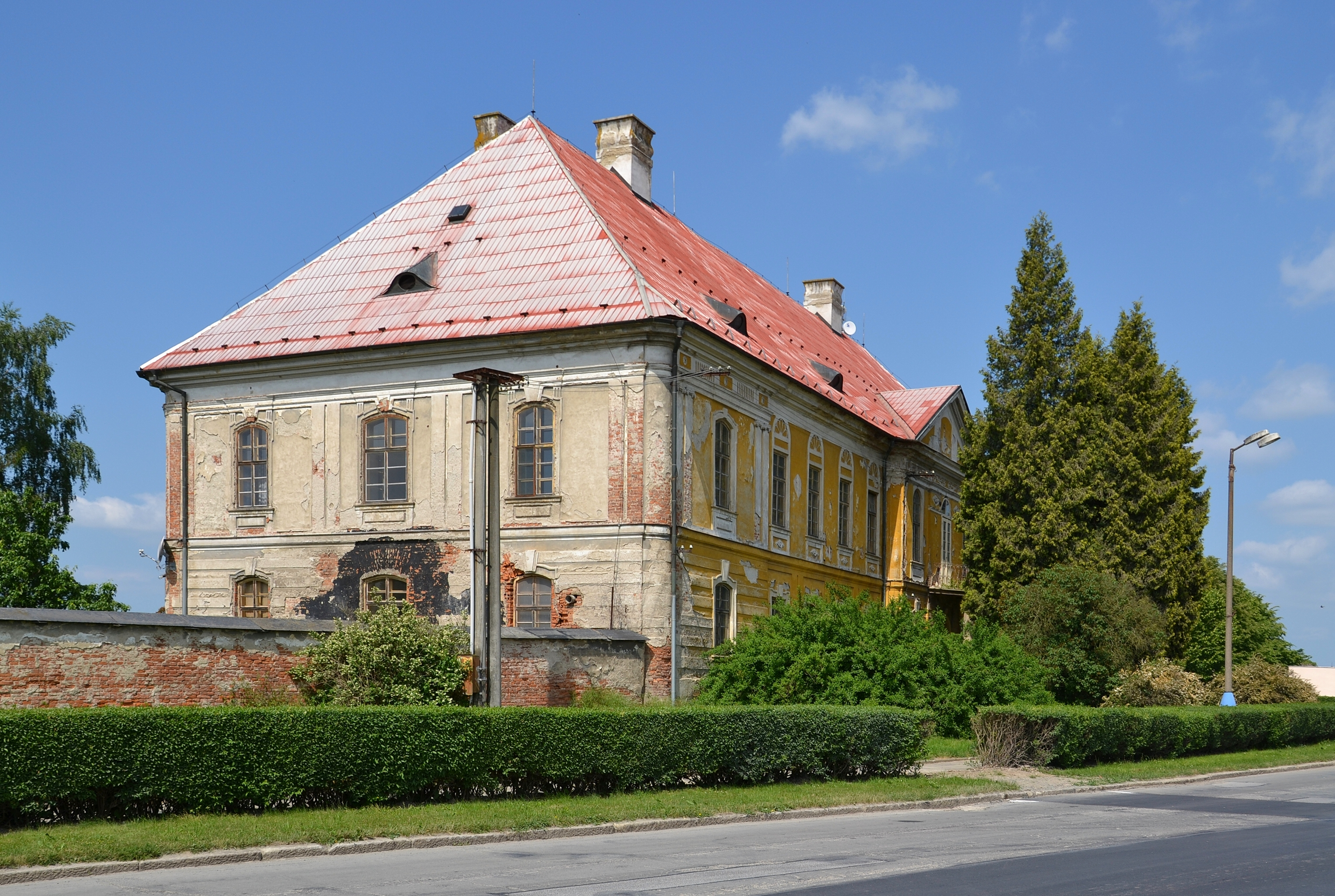
- Žerotín Castle

- Flag Coat of arms

- Location in the Czech Republic
- Coordinates: 49°43′28″N 17°11′13″E
- Country: Czech Republic
- Region: Olomouc
- District: Olomouc
- First mentioned: 1141

Area
  - Total: 7.85 km^{2} (3.03 sq mi)
- Elevation: 227 m (745 ft)

Population (2026-01-01)
  - Total: 446
  - Density: 56.8/km^{2} (147/sq mi)
- Time zone: UTC+1 (CET)
  - Summer (DST): UTC+2 (CEST)
- Postal code: 784 01
- Website: www.obeczerotin.cz

Žerotín is a municipality and village in Olomouc District in the Olomouc Region of the Czech Republic. It has about 400 inhabitants.

Žerotín lies approximately 15 kilometres (9 mi) north of Olomouc and 203 km (126 mi) east of Prague.

== History ==
The first written mention of Žerotín is in a deed of bishop Jindřich Zdík from 1141. Its history is connected with the noble Zierotin family that got its name from the village. The Zierotins owned Žerotín until the 15th century. The next 300 years it was owned by the Augustinian monastery in Šternberk.

== Demographics ==
Historical population
Year	Pop.	±%
1869	502	—
1880	548	+9.2%
1890	473	−13.7%
1900	509	+7.6%
1910	466	−8.4%
1921	460	−1.3%
1930	559	+21.5%
1950	434	−22.4%
1961	470	+8.3%
1970	461	−1.9%
1980	443	−3.9%
1991	415	−6.3%
2001	440	+6.0%
2011	433	−1.6%
2021	422	−2.5%
Source: Censuses
