= Qəzli, Sabirabad =

Qəzli
- Municipality
- Location within Azerbaijan
- Coordinates: 40°05′06″N 48°36′32″E
- Country: Azerbaijan
- Rayon: Sabirabad

Population
  - Total: 2,711
- Time zone: UTC+4 (AZT)
  - Summer (DST): UTC+5 (AZT)

Qəzli (also, Gazli, Kazeli, and Kezli) is a village and municipality in the Sabirabad Rayon of Azerbaijan. It has a population of 2,711.
