= Jiří Bořita of Martinice =

Bohemian Supreme Chancellor

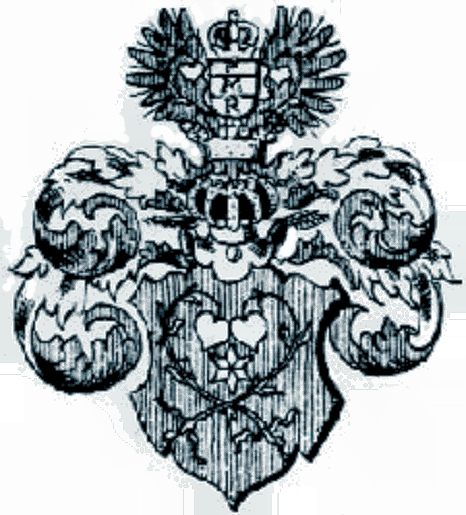
Family coat of arms

Jiří Bořita of Martinice (German: Georg Borzita von Martinitz; 1532 – 22 January 1598) was Bohemian Supreme Chancellor. He came from the noble Martinic family.

== Biography ==
His parents were Jan Bořita of Martinice († 1577) and his wife Isolde Berka of Dubá and Lipá († 1560). He received his education in Spain and held honorary posts with the Empress Maria. He was imperial chamberlain from 1575 to 1578, after which he was appointed Supreme Court Magistrate (Obersthoflehenrichter) in 1584 and Supreme Court Judge (Oberstlandrichter) in 1585. He retained this post until 1597, when, after the death of Oberstburggraf (Supreme Burgrave) Adam II in December 1596, he was appointed Supreme Chancellor of the Kingdom of Bohemia, becoming the highest-ranking Catholic in the kingdom.

He was indeed a catholico zelantissimo, a devotee of the Roman Catholic faith. He wielded considerable influence over the Emperor, which made him a "very welcome collaborator in the eyes of papal diplomats". People in Rome expected that after his appointment as Supreme Chancellor, there would be major changes in the kingdom in favor of the Catholic faith, with a "clear strengthening of their own political influence and that of the entire Catholic party", as evinced in an enthusiastic letter by Cesare Speciano, written shortly after Jiří Bořita's appointment to the office of Supreme Chancellor.

The wishes placed in him assuming the office soon proved true; however, although Jiří Bořita tried with everything in his power to fulfill the expectations of the Holy See's diplomat, he was ultimately unable to break the influence of the Vice-Chancellor, and the situation in the Bohemian Court Chancellery remained practically unchanged even after his appointment.

He was able to increase his possessions considerably. In 1578 he first bought parts of the Čelechovice estate from Friedrich Mičan von Klinstein, buying the rest from his heirs in 1595. In 1581 he bought the Stochov estate from Heinrich Georg Seidlitz von Schönfeld, and from Ludmila of Martinice, widow of Jiří Žďárský of Žďár, he bought Třebichovice, Řisuty and parts of Dobrá and Hrdlív. He also rebuilt the former Smečno Fortress into his family castle.

Jiří Bořita married the heiress Elisabeth of Wrbna. With her dowry he bought Smečno and paid off his brother. The marriage remained childless. His wife left her fortune to the two sons of his brother Yaroslav († 1582). Of these, George died young, so the fortune fell to Jaroslav Bořita of Martinice (1582–1649), his nephew, who later became famous for the Prague Defenestration.

Jiří Bořita of Martinice died suddenly on 22 January 1598.
