= Johann Christian Mikan =

Austrian-Czech botanist, zoologist and entomologist (1769–1844)

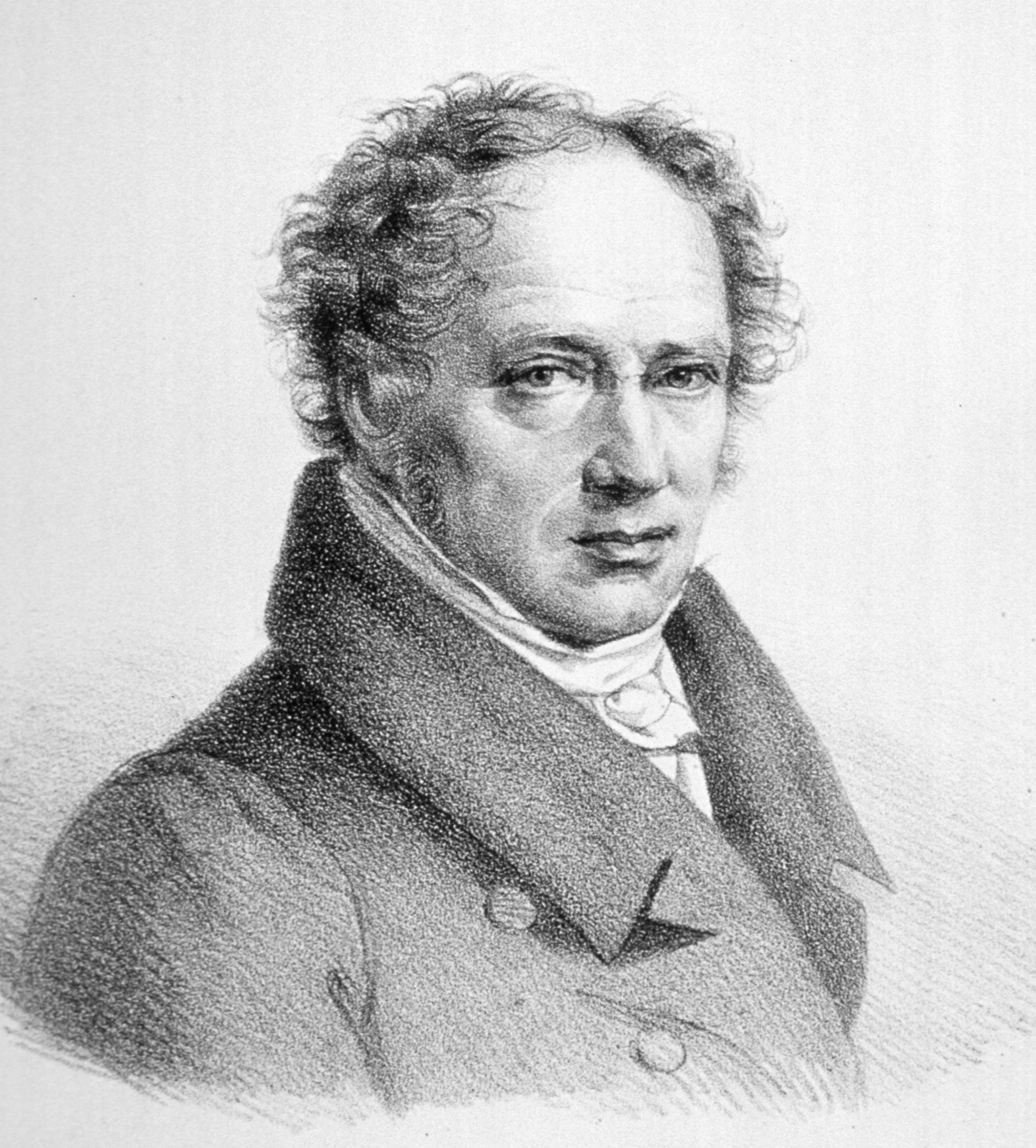
Drawing of Johann Christian Mikan

Johann Christian Mikan (5 December 1769 – 28 December 1844) was an Austrian-Czech botanist, zoologist and entomologist. He was the son of Joseph Gottfried Mikan.

== Life and career ==
Mikan was born on 5 December 1769 in Teplice, Bohemia. He was a professor of natural history at the University of Prague. He was one of three leading naturalists on the Austrian Brazil Expedition.

He wrote Monographia Bombyliorum Bohemiæ, iconibus illustrata in 1796, Entomologische Beobachtungen, Berichtigungen und Entdeckungen in 1797, and Delectus Florae et Faunae Brasiliensis, etc. in 1820. Mikan described many new species, including the black lion tamarin.

Mikan is commemorated in the scientific name of a species of South American snake, Dipsas mikanii.

The genus Mikania Willd. (Asteraceae) was named for his father Joseph Gottfried Mikan (1743–1814), professor of botany and chemistry at the University of Prague.

He died on 28 December 1844 in Prague.
