= Žerotín (Louny District) =

- Municipality
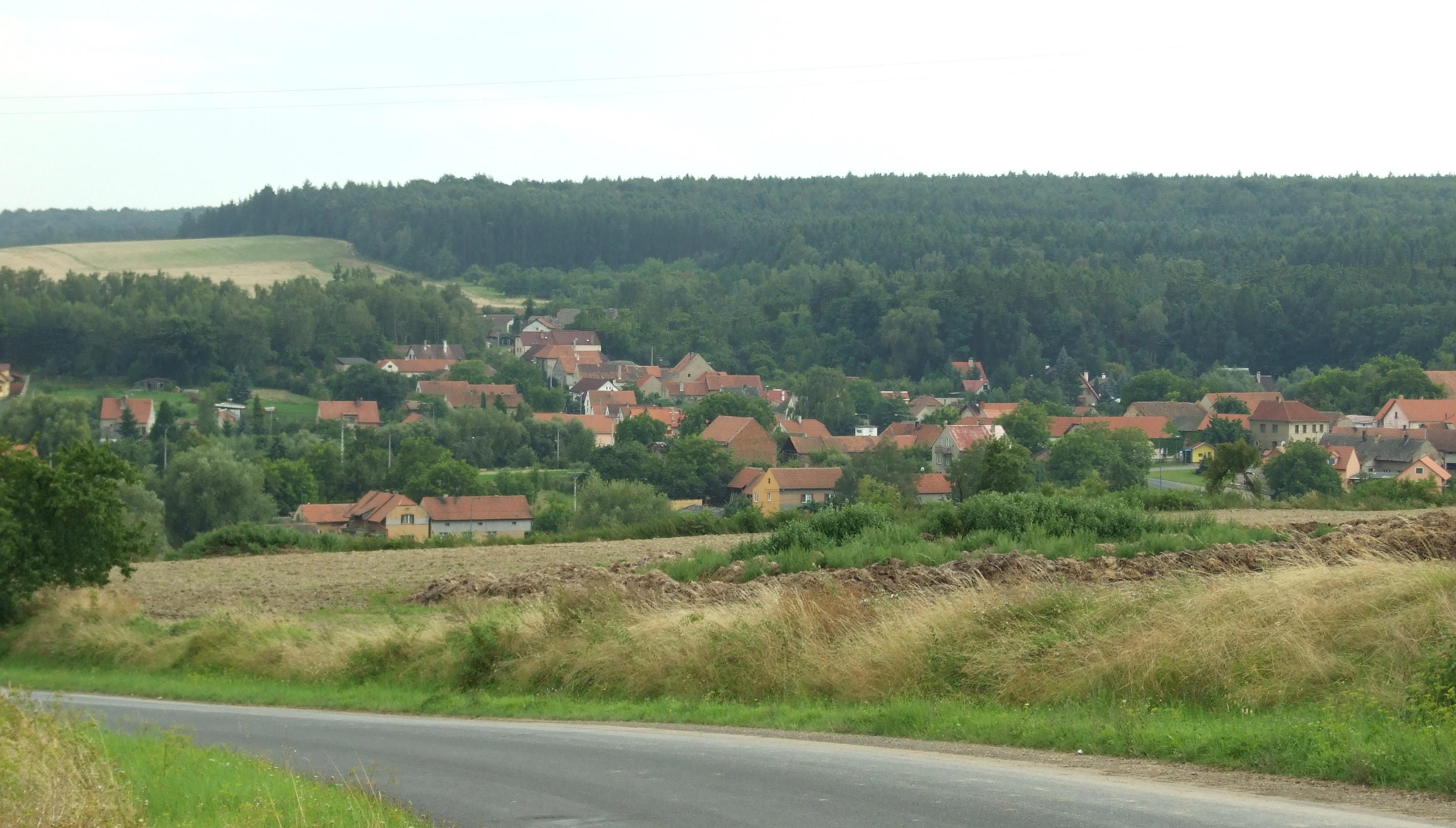
- View from the north

- Flag Coat of arms

- Location in the Czech Republic
- Coordinates: 50°17′11″N 13°54′44″E
- Country: Czech Republic
- Region: Ústí nad Labem
- District: Louny
- First mentioned: 1250

Area
  - Total: 11.20 km^{2} (4.32 sq mi)
- Elevation: 336 m (1,102 ft)

Population (2026-01-01)
  - Total: 226
  - Density: 20.2/km^{2} (52.3/sq mi)
- Time zone: UTC+1 (CET)
  - Summer (DST): UTC+2 (CEST)
- Postal code: 440 01
- Website: www.ouzerotin.cz

Žerotín (German: Scherotin) is a municipality and village in Louny District in the Ústí nad Labem Region of the Czech Republic. It has about 200 inhabitants.

Žerotín lies approximately 12 kilometres (7 mi) south-east of Louny, 46 km (29 mi) south of Ústí nad Labem, and 44 km (27 mi) north-west of Prague.

== Demographics ==
Historical population
Year	Pop.	±%
1869	406	—
1880	421	+3.7%
1890	388	−7.8%
1900	480	+23.7%
1910	456	−5.0%
1921	442	−3.1%
1930	350	−20.8%
1950	270	−22.9%
1961	270	+0.0%
1970	243	−10.0%
1980	204	−16.0%
1991	182	−10.8%
2001	173	−4.9%
2011	198	+14.5%
2021	205	+3.5%
Source: Censuses
