= Yellala Falls =

Waterfall in the Congo river, DRC

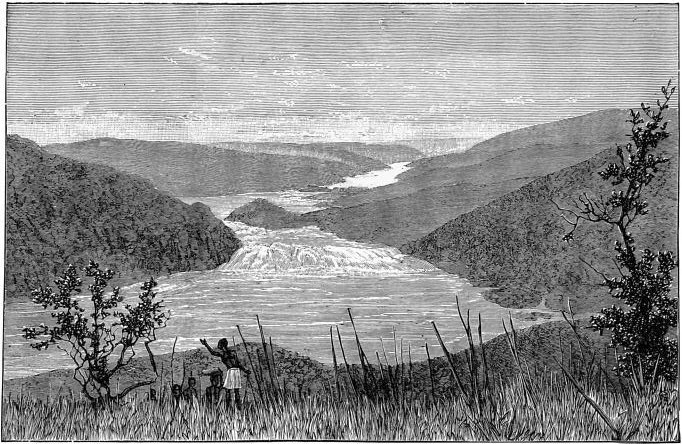
- The Yellala Falls from the left bank, c. 1880

- Location within Democratic Republic of the Congo
- Coordinates: 5°43′32″S 13°32′39″E
- Watercourse: Congo River

The Yellala Falls (Rapides de Yelala or Chutes Yelala; also spelled as Ielala) are a series of waterfalls and rapids on the Congo River just upstream from Matadi in the Democratic Republic of the Congo. The falls are the lowest of a long series of rapids that render the river unnavigable, forcing colonial explorers to travel by foot as far as the Stanley Pool 350 kilometres (220 mi) upstream. The Congo is the second largest river in the world by volume of water discharged, and the deepest in the world. The section of river that ends with the Yellala falls has over 300 species of fish, many found nowhere else.

== Location ==
The region drained by the Congo River covers one eighth of Africa, including both tropical rain forest and savanna, much of it in a huge, shallow basin. The present system of rivers seems to date from around five million years ago, not long ago on a geological time scale. At that time the Atlantic continental margin was lifted up and formed a barrier between the basin and the sea. A large lake formed before the Congo River broke through this barrier, running through a narrow, rocky channel about 350 kilometres (220 mi) long from Kinshasa to Matadi. The river is navigable both above and below this stretch, called the lower Congo.

The upper portion of the Lower Congo starts with the steep Livingstone Falls just below Kinshasa and continues for 133 kilometres (83 mi) through a number of smaller rapids. The central portion of about 129 kilometres (80 mi) is navigable, at times lake-like and at times narrow and as deep as 200 metres (660 ft). The lower portion of about 88 kilometres (55 mi) is the steepest, with huge rapids at the Inga Falls and again at the Yellala falls, after which the river is navigable to the ocean. About 1,250,000 cubic feet (35,000 m^{3}) of water flows over the falls each second.

== First European discovery ==
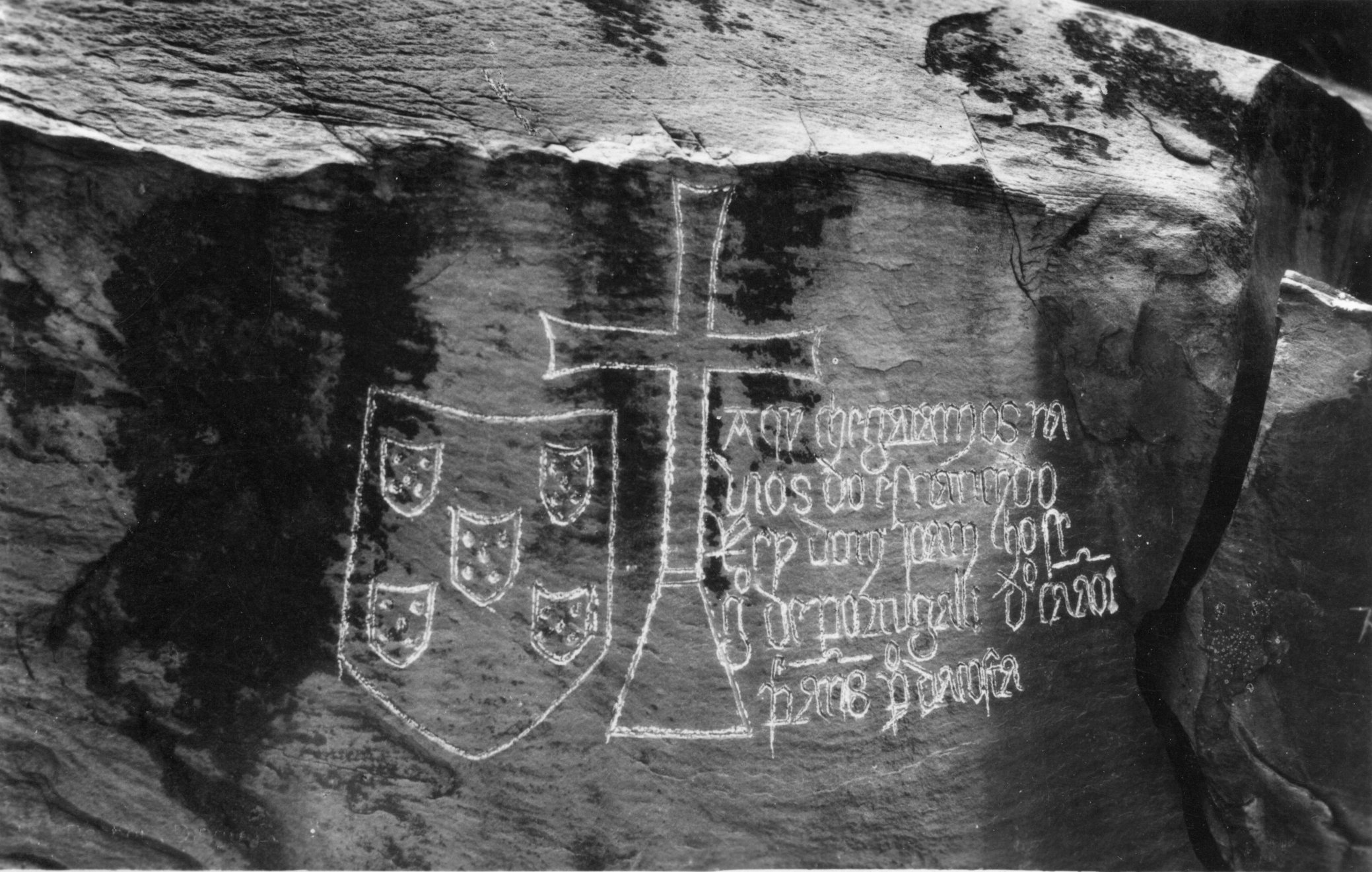
The Stone of Yellala, bearing an inscription of 1485 by Diogo Cão

The Yellala Falls were reached by Europeans as early as 1485, when the Portuguese explorer Diogo Cão took a group of men as far as the falls before they were forced to turn back by disease, probably malaria. In that place he set a padrão, a large stone cross-shaped marker, customary during the Portuguese Age of Discovery. The stone, which was not rediscovered until 1911, bears the words: "Aqui chegaram os navios do esclarecido rei D.João II de Portugal - Diogo Cão, Pero Anes, Pero da Costa." ("Here arrived the ships of illustrious John II, King of Portugal – Diogo Cão, Pero Anes, Pero da Costa".)

== Later European visitors and descriptions ==
Captain James Hingston Tuckey visited in 1816. He said that the local people thought the falls were the residence of an evil spirit, and that anyone who saw them would never see them again. Visiting in the dry season, he was disappointed by the falls. He described the site as comprising a large hill of syenite, a course-grained igneous rock, on the south side. The northern side, made of the same material, was not as high, but steeper than the south. He described the river as having forced its course and within the middle of the river an island of slate "still defies its power, and breaks the current into two narrow channels; that near the south side gives vent to a great mass of water, over which the torrent rushes with great fury and noise, as may easily be conceived".

Tuckey, who was sponsored by the Royal Geographical Society of London to obtain information on the slave trade, noted the brutality of the Portuguese slave trade and gathered valuable information about the geography, animals, plants, minerals and people of the region. Talking of the people who lived above the falls, Tuckey said that fowls, eggs, manioc and fruits were the property of women. The items were never dealt with by the men without a discussion with their wives. Beads were given as presents from the men. (Note: A chart of the Congo based on Tuckey's account showed the river opening out to a width of 4 miles (6.4 km) above the falls. Stanley pointed out in forceful terms that this was wrong, saying of a map of Africa "I dare not image that Captain Tuckey is responsible for these errors ... We also have just above the Falls of Yellala a stretch of river four or five miles wide, with islands, the whole of which I shall be able to show you is sheer nonsense". The map maker was at fault. Tuckey reached the Yellala Falls on 14 August, then went 40 miles (64 km) further to Inga, reaching the upper river on 24 August at a point where it was 300 yards (270 m) wide. It was not until 6 September that Tuckey's group was at a section about 280 miles (450 km) inland where the river was 4 miles (6.4 km) to 5 miles (8.0 km) wide. Due to sickness, fatal for Tuckey and others, the expedition was forced to return from this point.)

In 1848 the Hungarian László Magyar ascended the Congo to the Yellala falls, before spending five years exploring the region to the south. Due to his lack of contact with the outside world, the valuable information that he gathered received little circulation.

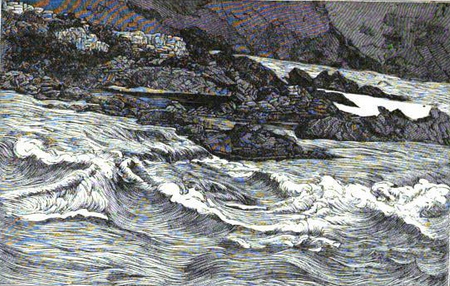
Yellala Falls from Sir Harry Johnston's 1884 account

Sir Richard Francis Burton, who first saw the falls in 1863, wrote a description of the great Yellala. Waves developed in the course of the river "for a mile and a half above". Afterwards, the water heads down a slope of around thirty feet "in 300 yards, spuming, colliding and throwing up foam, which looks dingy white against the dull yellow-brown of the less disturbed channel - the movement is that of waves dashing upon a pier". He went on: "The old river-valley, shown by the scarp of the rocks, must have presented gigantic features, and the height of the trough-walls, at least a thousand feet, gives the Yellala a certain beauty and grandeur. The site is apparently the highest axis of the dividing ridge separating the maritime lowlands from the inner plateau".

The explorer Henry Morton Stanley, who visited the falls on April 6, 1880, wrote that over a five or six mile stretch the incline was only 45 feet (14 m), but that the "general fury of the water is caused by the obstructions which the giant volume meets in the bed of the narrow defile." Sir Harry Johnston, who visited the falls in 1883, called the river "the last grand fall of Yellala" and detailed the sight and sounds of his impression of the falls.

== Ecological importance ==
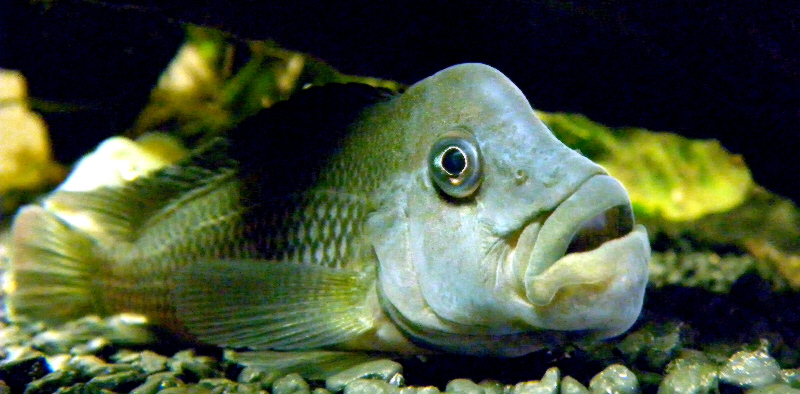
Steatocranus gibbiceps, a species of cichlid found in the lower Congo

The Yellala Falls and the other falls and rapids upstream have largely isolated the aquatic fauna of the Congo Basin for around five million years, a significant period on an evolutionary timescale. The cichlid genera Steatocranus, Nanochromis, Lamprologus and Teleogramma are found only in the Congo basin. Several dozen species in these genera are found only in the lower Congo. Steatocranus are rheophilic, meaning they have adapted to living in fast water. The four species of Teleogramma are found only in the lower Congo rapids. Genetically distinct populations have been found on opposite sides of the river. Although only 1 mile (1.6 km) apart, powerful currents that may exceed 30 miles per hour (48 km/h) have prevented interbreeding.

== Sources ==
- Ballard, Harlan Hoge (1887). The Swiss cross, Volumes 2-3. N.D.C. Hodges.
- Burton, Richard Francis (1876). Two trips to gorilla land and the cataracts of the Congo, Volume 1. S. Low, Marston, Low, and Searle. p. 284.
- Conley, Joseph F. (2000). Drumbeats that changed the world: a history of the Regions Beyond Missionary Union and the West Indies Mission, 1873-1999. William Carey Library. ISBN 978-0-87808-603-0.
- Dickman, Kyle (November 3, 2009). "Evolution in the Deepest River in the World". Smithsonian. Archived from the original on 2013-10-19.
- Headrick, Daniel R. (2010). Power over peoples: technology, environments, and Western imperialism, 1400 to the present. Princeton University Press. ISBN 978-0-691-13933-3.
- Kalumvueziko, Ngimbi (2009). Congo-Zaïre: le destin tragique d'une nation (in French). Editions L'Harmattan. ISBN 978-2-296-09607-3.
- Kochnitzky, Léon (1948). Negro art in Belgian Congo. Belgian Govt. Information Center.
- Markham, Sir Clements Robert (1875). "Discovery of the Course of the Congo". The Geographical Magazine. 2. Trübner & Co.
- Schwarzer, Julia; Misof, Bernhard; Ifuta, Seraphin N.; Schliewen, Ulrich K. (June 20, 2011). "Time and Origin of Cichlid Colonization of the Lower Congo Rapids". PLOS ONE. 6 (7) e22380. Bibcode:2011PLoSO...622380S. doi:10.1371/journal.pone.0022380. PMC 3140524. PMID 21799840.
- Spencer, Herbert (1877). "On the Evolution of the Family". The Popular Science Monthly. 11. Popular Science Pub. Co.
- Stanley, Henry Morton (1885). The Congo, and the founding of its Free State: a story of work and exploration. London: Sampson Low. p. 202. OCLC 681372837.
- "Stanley's New Discoveries". The Academy. Oct 20, 1877.
- Tuckey, James Hingston; Smith, Christen (1818). Narrative of an expedition to explore the river Zaire, usually called the Congo: in South Africa, in 1816, under the direction of Captain J.K. Tuckey, R.N. To which is added, the journal of Professor Smith; and some general observations on the country and its inhabitants. W.B. Gilley. p. 176.
