= Leporinus vanzoi =

Conservation status
- Least Concern (IUCN 3.1)

Scientific classification
- Kingdom: Animalia
- Phylum: Chordata
- Class: Actinopterygii
- Order: Characiformes
- Family: Anostomidae
- Genus: Leporinus
- Species: L. vanzoi

Binomial name
- Leporinus vanzoi Britski & Garavello, 2005

Species of fish

Leporinus vanzoi is a species of freshwater ray-finned fish belonging to the family Anostomidae, the toothed headstanders. It is endemic to Brazil and found in the Tapajós (upper Amazon basin). It can grow to 11.8 cm (4.6 in) standard length.

== Etymology ==
The fish is named in honor of herpetologist Paulo Emílio "Vanzo" Vanzolini (1924–2013), the founder of Expedição Permanente à Amazônia (EPA), which has greatly contributed to the Amazonian fish collection at the Universidade de São Paulo, Museu de Zoologia in São Paulo, Brazil and to Brazilian fish studies in general. The type specimens were collected by members of the EPA under the direction of Vanzolini.
