= Heiko Bleher =

German ichthyologist and adventurer (1944–2025)

- Born: 18 October 1944; Frankfurt on Main, Gau Hesse-Nassau, Germany
- Died: 15 August 2025 (aged 80)
- Known for: Ichthyological and Botanical field research worldwide
- Awards: Chevalier des Grand Ordre Rocamadour due Diamant noir (1993); Scientist of the year CAOAC (2008); Fellow of the Explorers Club (2010)
- Scientific career
- Fields: Explorer, researcher, photographer, filmmaker, author, editor

Heiko Bleher (18 October 1944 – 15 August 2025) was a German researcher, author, photographer and filmmaker. He is best known in the scientific community for his contribution to the exploration of fresh and brackish water habitats worldwide. He discovered numerous species of fish and aquatic plant, several of which carry his name or are named in honor of Bleher's family.

== Life and career ==
Heiko Bleher was born in Frankfurt on Main, Germany. He was the fourth and last child of Ludwig Bleher and Amanda Flora Hilda Bleher née Kiel. Bleher inherited his passion for freshwater fishes and aquatic plants from his mother. Amanda Flora Hilda Bleher was the daughter of Adolf Kiel, who is known as the "Father of Water Plants" and a pioneer of the modern aquarium. Adolf Kiel established the world's largest plant and ornamental fish farm in Frankfurt am Main, Germany, in 1900.

At the age of 4, Bleher's mother took him to Equatorial Guinea, in West Africa, on a research expedition. Two years later, he accompanied his mother on a journey throughout Europe, collecting plants and fishes. From age seven, he and his three siblings joined their mother on her adventurous exploration trip deep into the "green hell" of the South American jungle. During this two-year expedition, his mother discovered many new aquatic plant species, fishes and other animals. At the end of 1958, Bleher's family settled permanently in Brazil and established a water-plant nursery and fish-breeding hatchery called "Osiris" in the jungle outside Rio de Janeiro. In 1962, Bleher moved to the United States and later attended the University of South Florida, studying courses in ichthyology, biology, limnology, oceanography, parasitology, combined with work at Elsberry's Fish Farm and at Gulf Fish Farm. Upon returning to Rio de Janeiro in 1964, Bleher established his own export company, "Aquarium Rio", and continued his research and collecting throughout Brazil.

In 1964, Bleher introduced the Hemigrammus bleheri (the brilliant rummy-head tetra) to the aquarium hobby. It was the first species to be named after him. Bleher contributed to the rainbowfish species community by introducing Melanotaenia boesemani and many of the other almost 100 species of rainbowfish. In 1970, Bleher was the first to collect live Pterophyllum altum from Venezuela.

Bleher died on 15 August 2025, at the age of 80.

== Taxa named after him and his family ==
- The tetra Hemigrammus bleheri
- Leporinus bleheri
- Bleheratherina pierucciae
- The Cichlid Steatocranus bleheri M. K. Meyer
- The Snakehead Channa bleheri
- The African Tetra Phenacogrammus bleheri
- Moenkhausia heikoi
- The Rainbowfish Chilatherina bleheri
- The Bromeliad Vriesea bleheri, collected by Amanda and Michael Bleher
- Hyphessobrycon amandae is named in honor of Amanda Bleher (1910–1991), the mother of Heiko Bleher, who collected the type specimen and because of her interest in and her knowledge of the freshwater fauna and flora of Brazil

== Controversies ==
In 2012, Bleher was accused of plagiarising fish images, submitting them as his own for a Practical Fishkeeping article entitled "PFK's Definitive Guide to Channa". In 2019, he was again accused of plagiarism, whereby images of freshwater fishes were used uncredited in his book "Indian Ornamental Fishes Volume 1". The images were, in fact, the property of a well-known blog writer based in India.
