= Leporinus melanopleurodes =

Conservation status
- Near Threatened (IUCN 3.1)

Scientific classification
- Kingdom: Animalia
- Phylum: Chordata
- Class: Actinopterygii
- Order: Characiformes
- Family: Anostomidae
- Genus: Leporinus
- Species: L. melanopleurodes

Binomial name
- Leporinus melanopleurodes Birindelli, Britski & Garavello, 2013

Species of fish

Leporinus melanopleurodes is a species of freshwater ray-finned fish belonging to the family Anostomidae, the toothed headstanders. This fish is found in the Das Almas River and Jequiriçá River in Bahia, Brazil.

== Description ==
Leporinus melanopleurodes can reach a standard length of 12.9 centimetres (5.1 in).
