= Leporinus cylindriformis =

Conservation status
- Least Concern (IUCN 3.1)

Scientific classification
- Kingdom: Animalia
- Phylum: Chordata
- Class: Actinopterygii
- Order: Characiformes
- Family: Anostomidae
- Genus: Leporinus
- Species: L. cylindriformis

Binomial name
- Leporinus cylindriformis Borodin 1929

Species of fish

Leporinus cylindriformis is a species of freshwater ray-finned fish belonging to the family Anostomidae, the toothed headstanders. It is found in the lower Amazon River basin in Brazil.

== Description ==
Leporinus cylindriformis can reach a standard length of 19.9 centimetres (7.8 in).
