= Leporinus paranensis =

Conservation status
- Least Concern (IUCN 3.1)

Scientific classification
- Kingdom: Animalia
- Phylum: Chordata
- Class: Actinopterygii
- Order: Characiformes
- Family: Anostomidae
- Genus: Leporinus
- Species: L. paranensis

Binomial name
- Leporinus paranensis Garavello & Britski, 1987

Species of fish

Leporinus paranensis is a species of freshwater ray-finned fish belonging to the family Anostomidae, the toothed headstanders. It is found in the Paraná River basin in South America.

== Description ==
Leporinus paranensis can reach a standard length of 16.0 centimetres (6.3 in).
