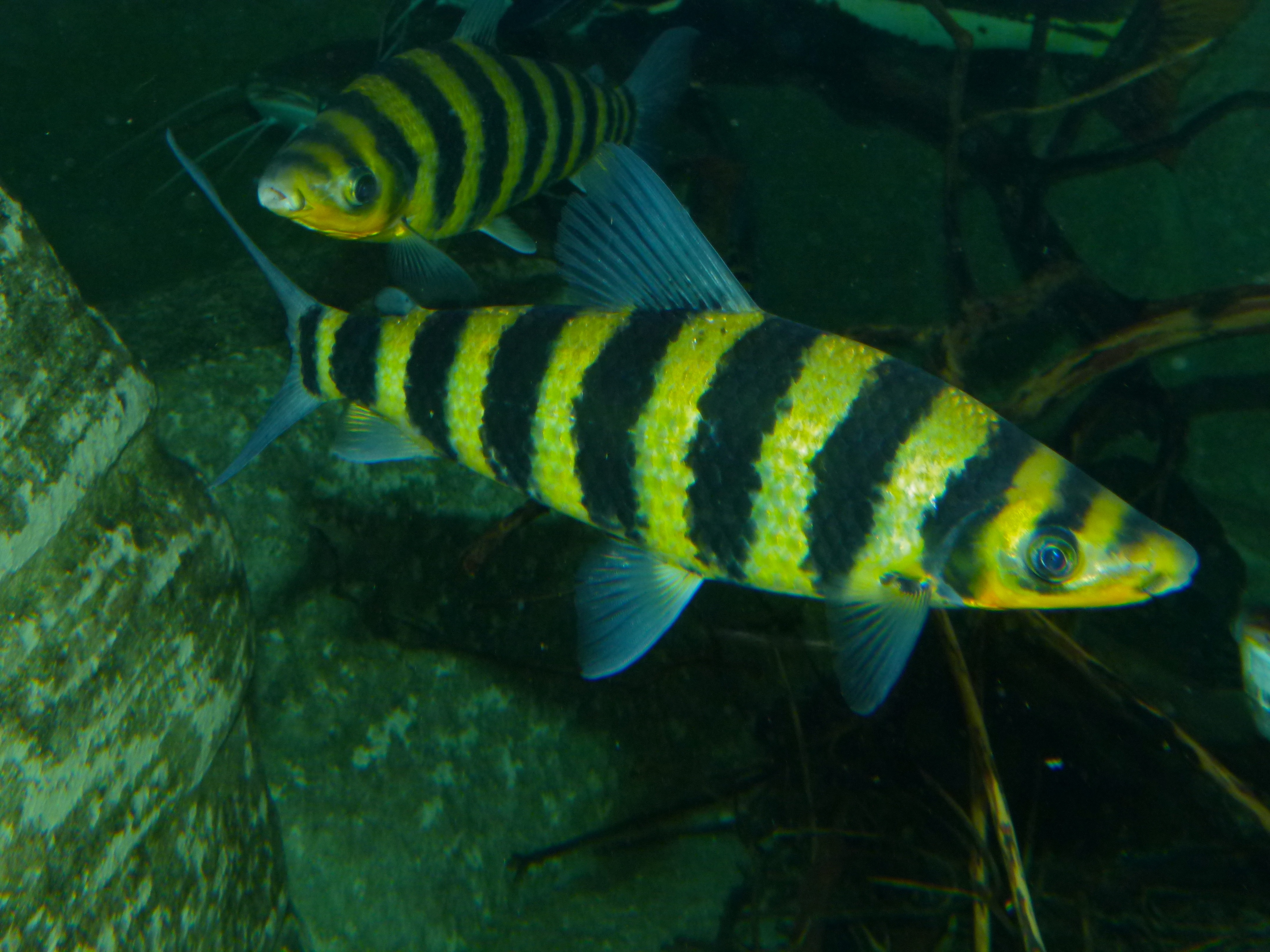
- Leporinus fasciatus
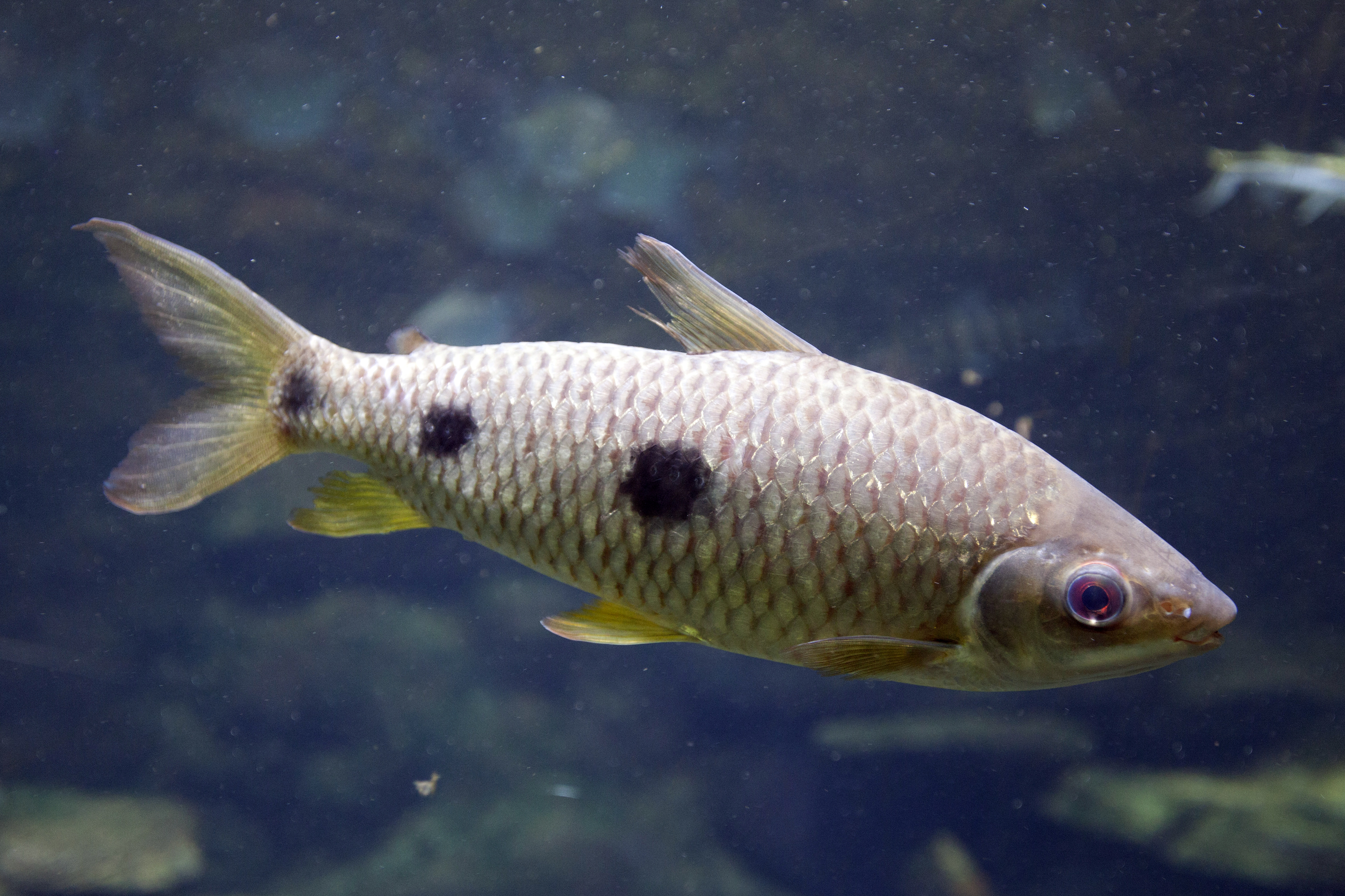
- Leporinus friderici

Scientific classification
- Kingdom: Animalia
- Phylum: Chordata
- Class: Actinopterygii
- Order: Characiformes
- Family: Anostomidae
- Subfamily: Leporininae
- Genus: Leporinus; Agassiz, 1829

Type species
- Leporinus novemfasciatus Spix & Agassiz, 1829

Synonyms
- Leporinops Géry, 1960; Myocharax Fowler, 1914

= Leporinus =

Genus of fishes

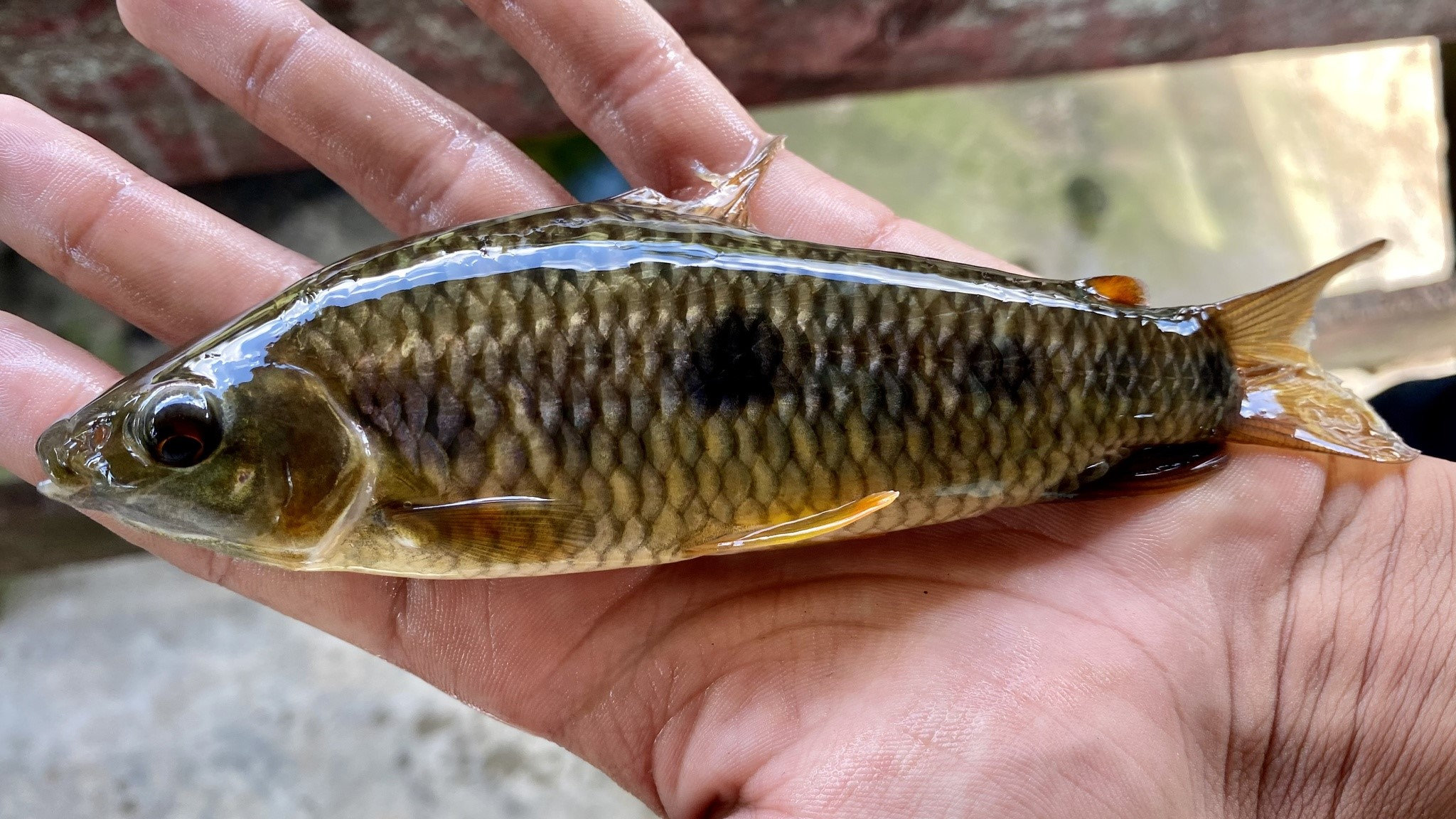
Leporinus bahiensis

Leporinus is a genus of freshwater ray-finned fish belonging to the family Anostomidae, the toothed headstanders. The fishes in this genus are found in South America.

== Species ==
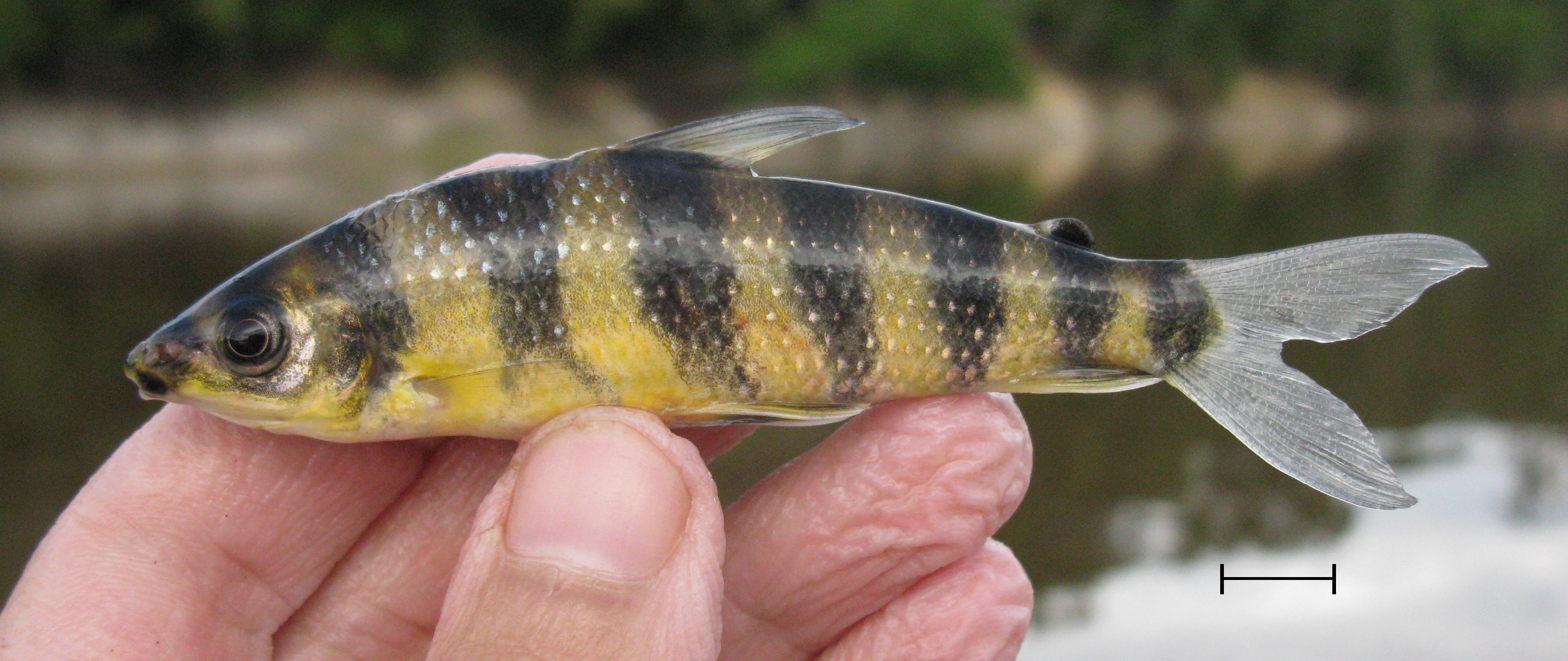
Leporinus enyae

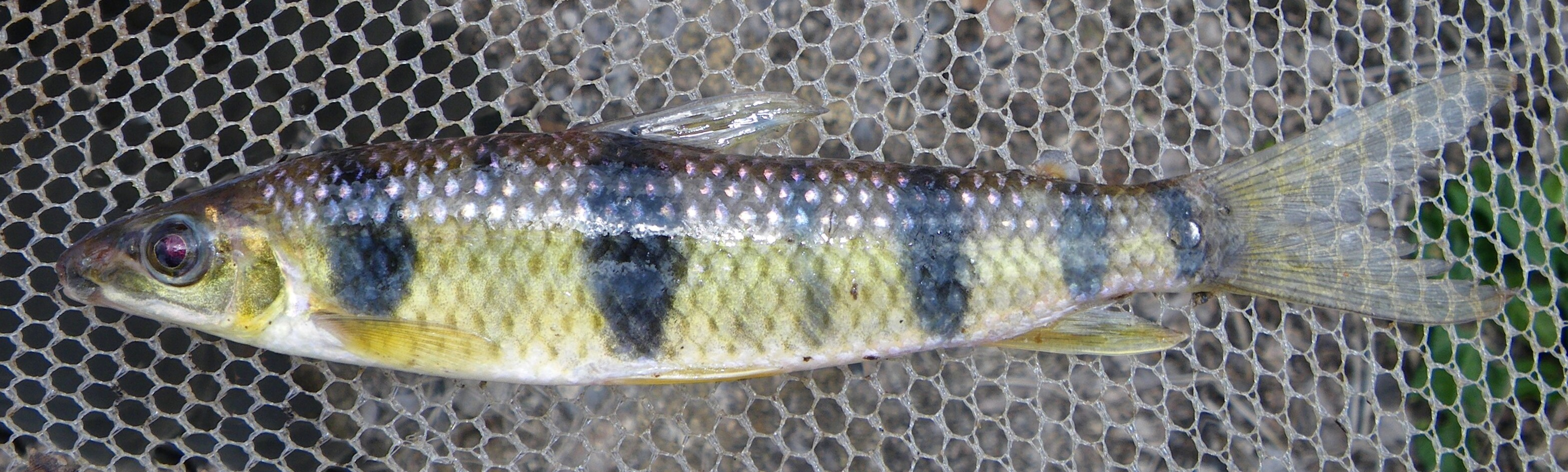
Leporinus maculatus

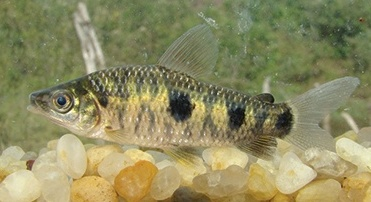
Leporinus piau

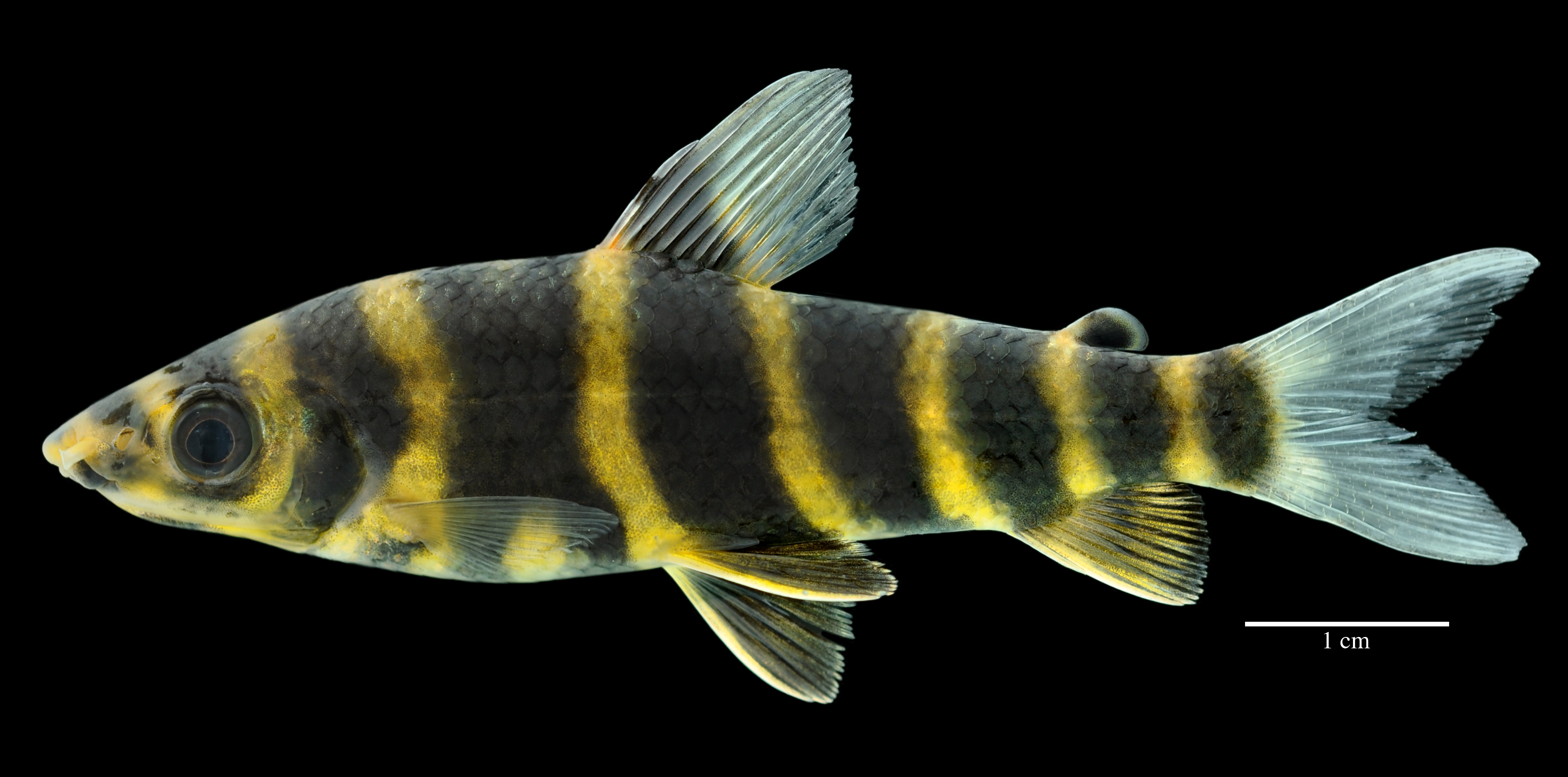
Leporinus villasboasorum

These are the currently recognized species in this genus:

- Leporinus acutidens (Valenciennes, 1837)
- Leporinus affinis Günther, 1864
- Leporinus agassizii Steindachner, 1876
- Leporinus altipinnis Borodin, 1929
- Leporinus amae Godoy (pt), 1980
- Leporinus amazonicus G. M. dos Santos & Zuanon, 2008
- Leporinus amblyrhynchus Garavello & Britski, 1987
- Leporinus apollo Sidlauskas, Mol & Vari, 2011
- Leporinus arimaspi Burns, Frable & Sidlauskas, 2014
- Leporinus aripuanaensis Garavello & G. M. dos Santos, 1981
- Leporinus bahiensis Steindachner, 1875
- Leporinus bistriatus Britski, 1997
- Leporinus bleheri Géry, 1999
- Leporinus boehlkei Garavello, 1988
- Leporinus britskii Feitosa, G. M. dos Santos & Birindelli, 2011
- Leporinus brunneus G. S. Myers, 1950
- Leporinus cylindriformis Borodin, 1929
- Leporinus desmotes Fowler, 1914
- Leporinus ecuadorensis C. H. Eigenmann & Henn, 1916
- Leporinus enyae Burns, Chatfield, Birindelli, & Sidlauskas 2017
- Leporinus fasciatus (Bloch, 1794)
- Leporinus friderici (Bloch, 1794)
- Leporinus geminis Garavello & G. M. dos Santos, 2009
- Leporinus gossei Géry, Planquette & Le Bail, 1991
- Leporinus guttatus Birindelli & Britski, 2009
- Leporinus inexpectatus Britski, Garavello, Oliveira & Birindelli, 2024
- Leporinus jamesi Garman, 1929
- Leporinus jatuncochi Ovchynnyk, 1971
- Leporinus julii (dos Santos, Jégu & A. C. Lima, 1996)
- Leporinus klausewitzi Géry, 1960
- Leporinus lacustris Amaral Campos, 1945
- Leporinus leschenaulti Valenciennes, 1850
- Leporinus lignator Boaretto, Ohara, Souza-Shibatta & Birindelli, 2025
- Leporinus maculatus J. P. Müller & Troschel, 1844
- Leporinus marcgravii Lütken, 1875
- Leporinus melanopleura Günther, 1864
- Leporinus melanopleurodes Birindelli, Britski & Garavello, 2013
- Leporinus microphthalmus Garavello, 1989
- Leporinus microphysus Birindelli & Britski, 2013
- Leporinus moralesi Fowler, 1942
- Leporinus multimaculatus Birindelli, Teixeira & Britski, 2016
- Leporinus niceforoi Fowler, 1943
- Leporinus nigrotaeniatus (Jardine, 1841)
- Leporinus octofasciatus Steindachner, 1915
- Leporinus octomaculatus Britski & Garavello, 1993
- Leporinus oliveirai Ito, Souza-Shibatta, Venturieri & Birindelli, 2023
- Leporinus ortomaculatus Garavello, 2000
- Leporinus pachycheilus (Britski, 1976)
- Leporinus parae C. H. Eigenmann, 1907
- Leporinus paranensis Garavello & Britski, 1987
- Leporinus parvulus Birindelli, Britski & F. C. T. Lima, 2013
- Leporinus pearsoni Fowler, 1940
- Leporinus piau Fowler, 1941
- Leporinus pitingai G. M. dos Santos & Jégu, 1996
- Leporinus punctatus Garavello, 2000
- Leporinus reticulatus Britski & Garavello, 1993
- Leporinus sexstriatus Britski & Garavello, 1980
- Leporinus sidlauskasi Britski & Birindelli, 2019
- Leporinus spilopleura Norman, 1926
- Leporinus steyermarki R. F. Inger, 1956
- Leporinus subniger Fowler, 1943
- Leporinus taeniatus Lütken, 1875
- Leporinus taeniofasciatus Britski, 1997
- Leporinus tigrinus Borodin, 1929
- Leporinus trimaculatus Garavello & G. M. dos Santos, 1992
- Leporinus tristriatus Birindelli & Britski, 2013
- Leporinus unitaeniatus Garavello & G. M. dos Santos, 2009
- Leporinus villasboasorum Burns, Chatfield, Birindelli & Sidlauskas, 2017
- Leporinus vanzoi Britski & Garavello, 2005
- Leporinus venerei Britski & Birindelli, 2008
- Leporinus yophorus C. H. Eigenmann, 1922

== Synonyms ==
The following species were formerly placed in Leporinus but have since been moved to other genera:

- Hypomasticus copelandii was described as Leporinus copelandii Steindachner, 1875
- Hypomasticus steindachneri was described as Leporinus steindachneri C. H. Eigenmann, 1907
