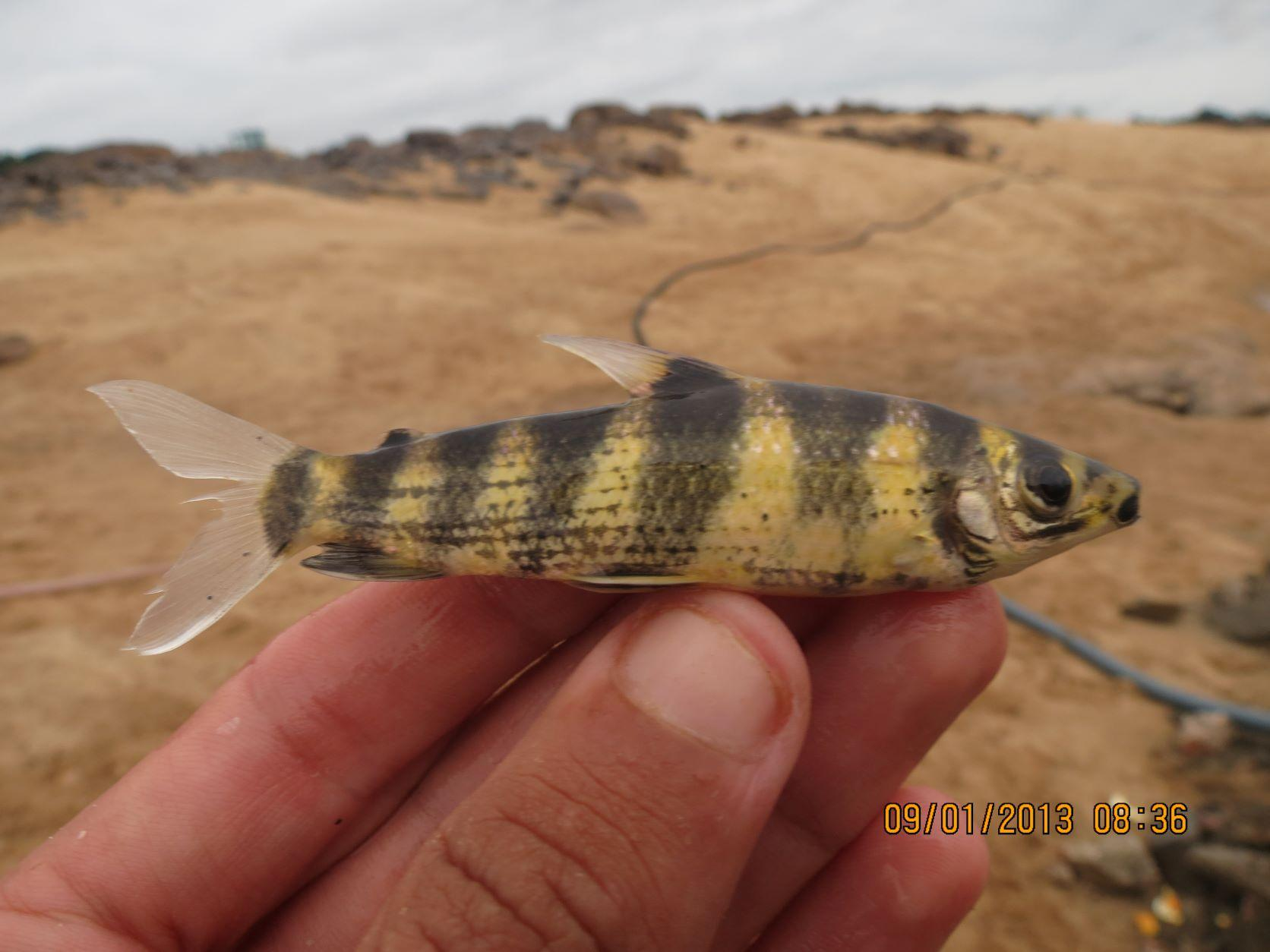

Conservation status
- Least Concern (IUCN 3.1)

Scientific classification
- Kingdom: Animalia
- Phylum: Chordata
- Class: Actinopterygii
- Order: Characiformes
- Family: Anostomidae
- Genus: Leporinus
- Species: L. desmotes

Binomial name
- Leporinus desmotes Fowler, 1914

= Leporinus desmotes =

Species of fish

Leporinus desmotes is a species of freshwater ray-finned fish belonging to the family Anostomidae, the toothed headstanders. This fish is found in northern South America.

== Size ==
The maximum size for L. desmotes is 22 cm (8.7 in).

== Range ==
Leporinus desmotes lives in Brazil, Guyana and Suriname in the Rupunini river basin.

== Habitat ==
Leporinus desmotes lives in wetlands with a preferred pH of 6.5 - 7.2.

== Diet ==
These fish are omnivorous, as they eat algae as well as aquatic invertebrates, such as aquatic insects, Tubifex and Daphnia.

== Conservation status ==
Leporinus desmotes is listed as Least Concern on the IUCN Red List.

== Captivity ==
Leporinus desmotes is a peaceful schooling fish that is not usually kept in the same tank as plants as it has been known to eat them. However, it likes roots, driftwood and stones to hide in and in the centre of the tank a free space to swim around in.
