= Leporinus multimaculatus =

Scientific classification
- Kingdom: Animalia
- Phylum: Chordata
- Class: Actinopterygii
- Order: Characiformes
- Family: Anostomidae
- Genus: Leporinus
- Species: L. multimaculatus

Binomial name
- Leporinus multimaculatus Birindelli, Teixeira & Britski, 2016

Species of fish

Leporinus multimaculatus is a species of freshwater ray-finned fish belonging to the family Anostomidae, the toothed headstanders. It is endemic to Brazil and found in small tributaries of the Araguaia River, the Tocantins River and the Xingu River basins. It is also found in the Jari River basin and coastal drainages of Amapá state.

== Description ==
Leporinus multimaculatus can reach a standard length of 11.1 centimetres (4.4 in).
