= Chilatherina pricei =

Scientific classification
- Domain: Eukaryota
- Kingdom: Animalia
- Phylum: Chordata
- Class: Actinopterygii
- Order: Atheriniformes
- Family: Melanotaeniidae
- Genus: Chilatherina
- Species: C. pricei

Binomial name
- Chilatherina pricei G. R. Allen & Renyaan, 1996

Species of fish

Chilatherina pricei, commonly known as Price's rainbowfish, is a species of rainbowfish only found on Yapen Island. The species was described by Gerald R. Allen and Samuel J. Renyaan in 1996, and was named after David Price, who collected the type specimen for this species.

== Distribution and habitat ==
Chilatherina pricei is endemic to Yapen, Cenderawasih Bay, Western New Guinea, Indonesia, where it is found in the main channel of the Reifafeif river system over boulders or rocks. Price's rainbowfish is sometimes found with the Melanotaenia japenensis, despite it generally not occurring in the main channel of the Reifafeif river.

== Description ==
Price's rainbowfish grows to a length of 7 to 10 cm (2.8 to 3.9 in), and was described based on 23 collected specimens. It looks similar to Chilatherina fasciata, but has a blunter snout.
