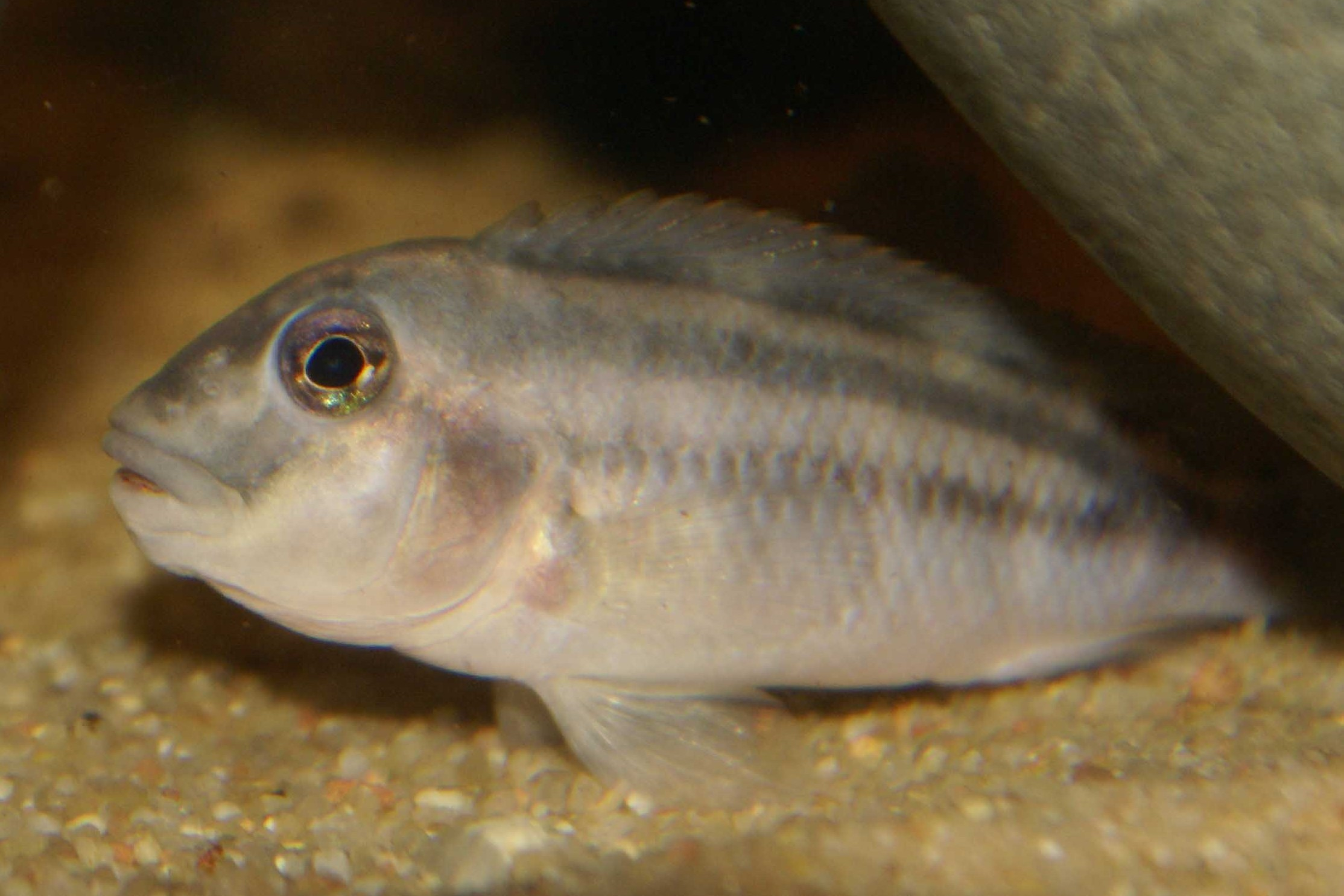

Conservation status
- Data Deficient (IUCN 3.1)

Scientific classification
- Kingdom: Animalia
- Phylum: Chordata
- Class: Actinopterygii
- Order: Cichliformes
- Family: Cichlidae
- Genus: Steatocranus
- Species: S. bleheri

Binomial name
- Steatocranus bleheri M. K. Meyer, 1993

= Steatocranus bleheri =

Species of fish

Steatocranus bleheri is species of fish in the cichlid family. It is endemic to the Kafubu River system, which is part of the Luapula drainage in the upper Congo River basin, in the Democratic Republic of the Congo.

== Description ==
Steatocranus bleheri can reach a standard length of 6.8 centimetres (2.7 in).

== Etymology ==
The species epithet is named in honor of explorer and ornamental-fish wholesaler Heiko Bleher (b. 1944), who collected the type specimen.
