= Leporinus amae =

Conservation status
- Least Concern (IUCN 3.1)

Scientific classification
- Kingdom: Animalia
- Phylum: Chordata
- Class: Actinopterygii
- Order: Characiformes
- Family: Anostomidae
- Genus: Leporinus
- Species: L. amae

Binomial name
- Leporinus amae Godoy (pt), 1980

Species of fish

Leporinus amae, the parrot leporinus, is a species of freshwater ray-finned fish belonging to the family Anostomidae, the toothed headstanders. It is found in the Uruguay River basin in South America.

== Description ==
Leporinus amae can reach a standard length of 19.4 centimetres (7.6 in).
