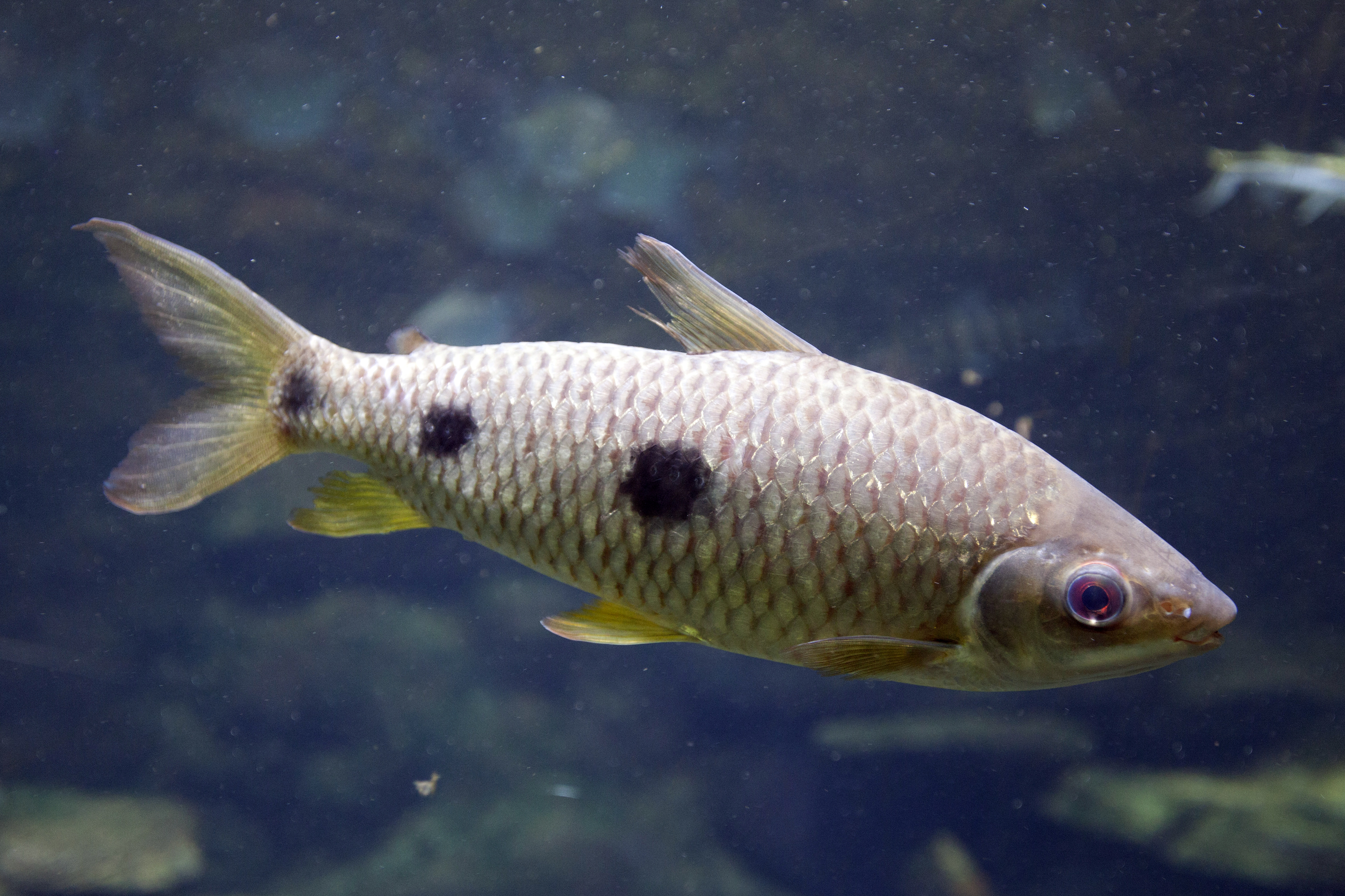

Conservation status
- Least Concern (IUCN 3.1)

Scientific classification
- Kingdom: Animalia
- Phylum: Chordata
- Class: Actinopterygii
- Division: Teleostei
- Order: Characiformes
- Family: Anostomidae
- Genus: Leporinus
- Species: L. friderici

Binomial name
- Leporinus friderici Bloch, 1794

= Leporinus friderici =

Species of fish

Leporinus friderici (or the threespot leporinus) is a species of freshwater fish in the family Anostomidae native to South America. The species is important for subsistence fisheries and is widely used in fish stocking programs in its native range.

== Distribution and habitat ==
Leoprinus friderici is found throughout Suriname and the Amazon River basin. It has also been reportedly found in Argentina.

== Description ==
Leoprinus friderici reaches up to about 40 cm (16 in) in standard length and a maximum published weight of 1.5 kg. Sexual maturity is reached at approximately 18.1 cm in standard length. The species has an elongate, fusiform body with a terminal mouth.

Adults are distinguished by three dark, rounded spots or blotches along the sides of the body. The first spot is located below the dorsal fin, the second beneath the adipose fin, and the third on the caudal peduncle at the base of the tail.

== Relationship with humans ==
Leporinus friderici is valued as a food fish due to the quality of its meat despite having numerous bones. It is an important species for subsistence fisheries in South America and is used in repopulation programs for river systems affected by hydroelectric dams. The species was among the most widely harvested fish in Brazil in 2018.
