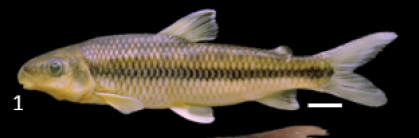

Conservation status
- Least Concern (IUCN 3.1)

Scientific classification
- Kingdom: Animalia
- Phylum: Chordata
- Class: Actinopterygii
- Order: Characiformes
- Family: Anostomidae
- Genus: Leporinus
- Species: L. amblyrhynchus

Binomial name
- Leporinus amblyrhynchus Garavello & Britski, 1987

= Leporinus amblyrhynchus =

Species of fish

Leporinus amblyrhynchus is a species of freshwater ray-finned fish belonging to the family Anostomidae, the toothed headstanders. It is found in the Paraná River basin in South America.

== Description ==
This species can reach a standard length of 27.4 centimetres (10.8 in).
