= Leporinus taeniofasciatus =

Conservation status
- Least Concern (IUCN 3.1)

Scientific classification
- Kingdom: Animalia
- Phylum: Chordata
- Class: Actinopterygii
- Order: Characiformes
- Family: Anostomidae
- Genus: Leporinus
- Species: L. taeniofasciatus

Binomial name
- Leporinus taeniofasciatus Britski, 1997

Species of fish

Leporinus taeniofasciatus is a species of freshwater ray-finned fish belonging to the family Anostomidae, the toothed headstanders. It is found in the Tocantins River basin in Brazil.

== Description ==
Leporinus taeniofasciatus can reach a standard length of 12.9 centimetres (5.1 in).
