= Leporinus geminis =

Conservation status
- Least Concern (IUCN 3.1)

Scientific classification
- Kingdom: Animalia
- Phylum: Chordata
- Class: Actinopterygii
- Order: Characiformes
- Family: Anostomidae
- Genus: Leporinus
- Species: L. geminis

Binomial name
- Leporinus geminis Garavello & G. M. dos Santos, 2009

Species of fish

Leporinus geminis is a species of freshwater ray-finned fish belonging to the family Anostomidae, the toothed headstanders. It is found in the Tocantins River, Brazil.

== Description ==
Leporinus geminis can reach a standard length of 18.0 centimetres (7.1 in).
