= Axelrod's rainbowfish =

Conservation status
- Endangered (IUCN 3.1)

Scientific classification
- Kingdom: Animalia
- Phylum: Chordata
- Class: Actinopterygii
- Order: Atheriniformes
- Family: Melanotaeniidae
- Genus: Chilatherina
- Species: C. axelrodi

Binomial name
- Chilatherina axelrodi G. R. Allen, 1979

Species of fish

Axelrod's rainbowfish (Chilatherina axelrodi) is a species of rainbowfish in the subfamily Melanotaeniinae. It is found in Papua New Guinea in the Yungkiri stream in the north western part of that nation. Typically its preferred habitat is a narrow stream with gentle moving, cloudy water surrounded by lush rainforest.

== Description ==
The males of Axelrod's rainbowfish are bluish-grey to greenish-brown in colour on the dorsal part of their body and silvery-grey to whitish on the ventral part. There are around 10 short bars along the centre of flanks, spaced roughly two scales apart and these merge to form a more or less solid blackish stripe along the caudal peduncle. The lower part of the body has about 6-10 faint dusky bars with those on side of abdomen more obvious than the others. On the back and upper flanks there are a number of bluish stripes while the lower part of the body is marked with faint yellow stripes which border each longitudinal scale row. The dorsal, anal and pelvic fins are yellowish while the remaining fins are translucent. The females are less colourful than the malesd and are a silvery colour with no markings. The males are larger and have deeper bodies than the females. The males can grow to a maximum standard length of 10 centimetres (3.9 in) while the females are normally less than 8 centimetres (3.1 in). There are 6-8 spines in the dorsal fins and 113 soft rays, there is a single spine in the anal fin with 19-24 soft rays

== Distribution ==
Axelrod's rainbowfish is only known to occur in the Yungkiri Stream in the Bewani Mountains of Sandaun Province in north western Papua New Guinea.

== Habitat and biology ==
Axelrod's rainbowfish live in a small, narrow rainforest streams where they have been recorded around aquatic vegetation and among submerged logs and branches in slightly turbid water. The spawning season runs from October to January, each female laying between 50 and 150 eggs in batches over several days.

== Species description and naming ==
Axelrod's rainbowfish was described in 1979 by Gerald R. Allen, Allen named the species after Herbert R. Axelrod (1927–2017), a publisher of books about pets, who gave financial aid to Allen's 1979 expedition to New Guinea.
