= Leporinus melanopleura =

Conservation status
- Least Concern (IUCN 3.1)

Scientific classification
- Kingdom: Animalia
- Phylum: Chordata
- Class: Actinopterygii
- Order: Characiformes
- Family: Anostomidae
- Genus: Leporinus
- Species: L. melanopleura

Binomial name
- Leporinus melanopleura Günther 1864

Species of fish

Leporinus melanopleura s a species of freshwater ray-finned fish belonging to the family Anostomidae, the toothed headstanders. It is found in the Amazon River basin in South America.

== Description ==
Leporinus melanopleura can reach a standard length of 30.0 centimetres (11.8 in).
