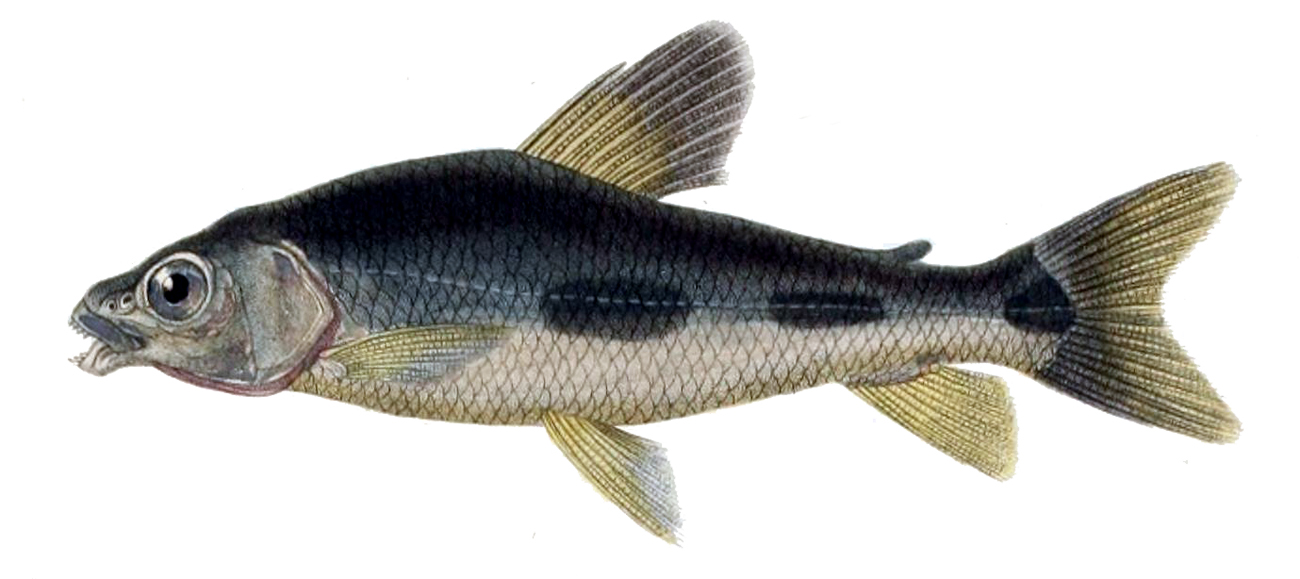

Conservation status
- Least Concern (IUCN 3.1)

Scientific classification
- Kingdom: Animalia
- Phylum: Chordata
- Class: Actinopterygii
- Order: Characiformes
- Family: Anostomidae
- Genus: Leporinus
- Species: L. acutidens

Binomial name
- Leporinus acutidens (Valenciennes, 1837)

Synonyms
- Curimatus acutidens Valenciennes, 1837; Leporinus friderici acutidens (Valenciennes, 1837)

= Leporinus acutidens =

Species of fish

Leporinus acutidens is a species of freshwater ray-finned fish belonging to the family Anostomidae, the toothed headstanders. It is found in the Amazon River basin and Guiana rivers in South America. It has also been reported from Argentina.

== Description ==
Leporinus acutidens can reach a standard length of 33.0 centimetres (13.0 in).

== Reproduction ==
Females become sexually mature after two year and males after one year. They reproduce between November and March and females can produce from 100,000 to 200,000 eggs when spawning.
