= Leporinus sexstriatus =

Conservation status
- Least Concern (IUCN 3.1)

Scientific classification
- Kingdom: Animalia
- Phylum: Chordata
- Class: Actinopterygii
- Order: Characiformes
- Family: Anostomidae
- Genus: Leporinus
- Species: L. sexstriatus

Binomial name
- Leporinus sexstriatus Britski & Garavello, 1993

Species of fish

Leporinus sexstriatus is a species of freshwater ray-finned fish belonging to the family Anostomidae, the toothed headstanders. It is found in the Papagaio and Tapajós River basins in Brazil.

== Description ==
Leporinus sexstriatus can reach a standard length of 8.0 centimetres (3.1 in).
