= Leporinus parvulus =

Conservation status
- Data Deficient (IUCN 3.1)

Scientific classification
- Kingdom: Animalia
- Phylum: Chordata
- Class: Actinopterygii
- Order: Characiformes
- Family: Anostomidae
- Genus: Leporinus
- Species: L. parvulus

Binomial name
- Leporinus parvulus Birindelli, Britski & F. C. T. Lima, 2013

Species of fish

Leporinus parvulus is a species of freshwater ray-finned fish belonging to the family Anostomidae, the toothed headstanders. It is found in the Tapajós River in Brazil.

== Description ==
Leporinus parvulus can reach a standard length of 7.7 centimetres (3.0 in).
