= Leporinus venerei =

Conservation status
- Least Concern (IUCN 3.1)

Scientific classification
- Kingdom: Animalia
- Phylum: Chordata
- Class: Actinopterygii
- Order: Characiformes
- Family: Anostomidae
- Genus: Leporinus
- Species: L. venerei

Binomial name
- Leporinus venerei Britski & Birindelli, 2008

Species of fish

Leporinus venerei is a species of freshwater ray-finned fish belonging to the family Anostomidae, the toothed headstanders. It is endemic to Brazil and known only from the Araguaia River basin.

== Description ==
Leporinus venerei can reach a standard length of 13.6 centimetres (5.4 in).

== Etymology ==
The species epithet is named in honor of Paulo Cesare Venere of the Universidade Federal de Mato Grosso, Campus Universitário do Araguaia. It was he who collected the first known specimens of this species in 1995.
