= Leporinus tigrinus =

Conservation status
- Least Concern (IUCN 3.1)

Scientific classification
- Kingdom: Animalia
- Phylum: Chordata
- Class: Actinopterygii
- Order: Characiformes
- Family: Anostomidae
- Genus: Leporinus
- Species: L. tigrinus

Binomial name
- Leporinus tigrinus Borodin 1929

Species of fish

Leporinus tigrinus is a species of freshwater ray-finned fish belonging to the family Anostomidae, the toothed headstanders. It is native to the Tapajós, Tocantins and Xingu river basins in Brazil, and has also been introduced to the upper Paraná basin.

== Description ==
Leporinus tigrinus can reach up to 29.8 cm (11.7 in) in standard length.
