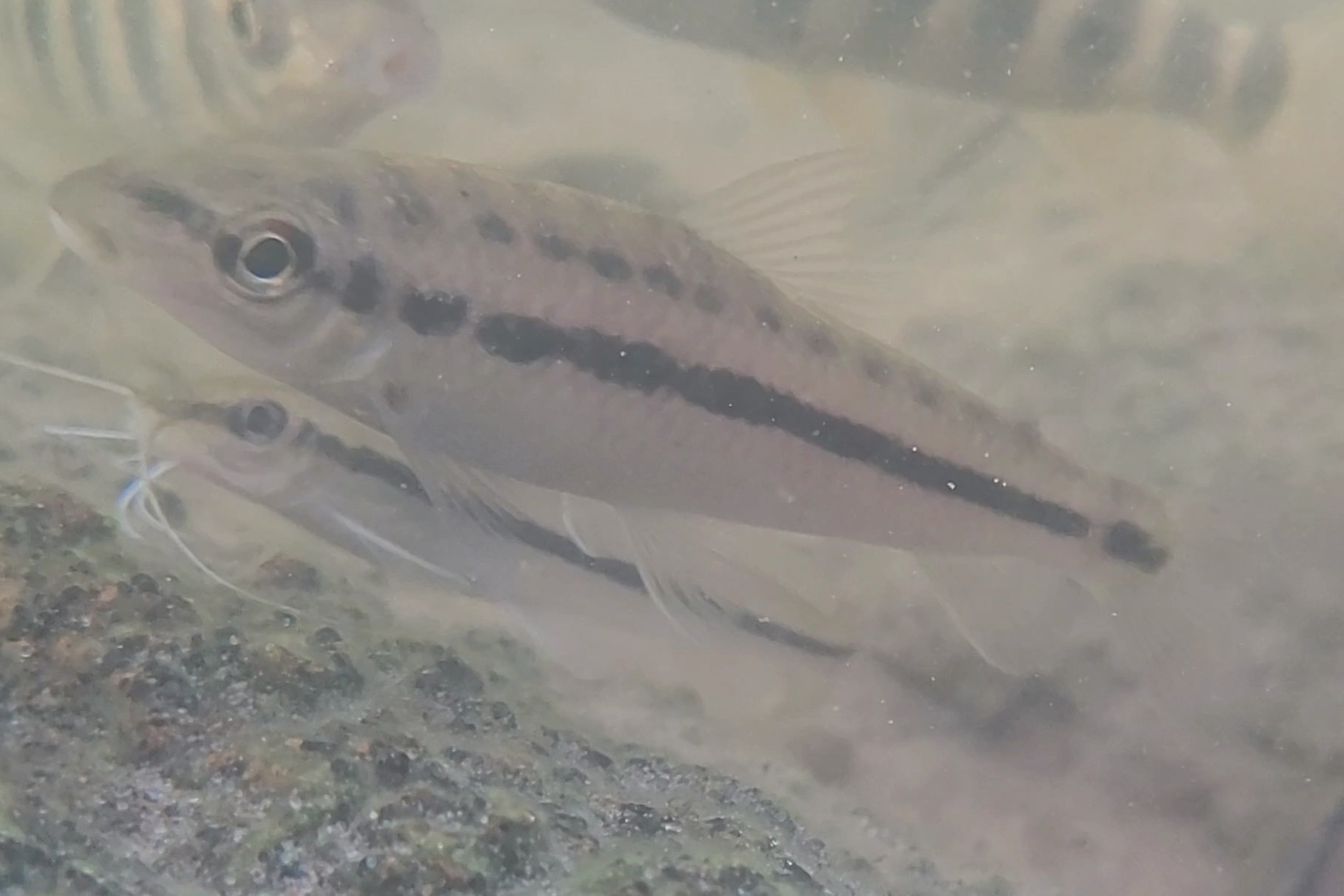

Scientific classification
- Kingdom: Animalia
- Phylum: Chordata
- Class: Actinopterygii
- Order: Characiformes
- Family: Anostomidae
- Genus: Leporinus
- Species: L. sidlauskasi

Binomial name
- Leporinus sidlauskasi Britski & Birindelli, 2019

= Leporinus sidlauskasi =

Species of fish

Leporinus sidlauskasi is a species of freshwater ray-finned fish belonging to the family Anostomidae, the toothed headstanders. It is found in the lower Tocantins River in Pará State, Brazil.

== Etymology ==
It is named in honor of Brian L. Sidlauskas (b. 1976), the Curator of Fishes at Oregon State University, for his contributions to the knowledge of the systematics of the family Anostomidae.
