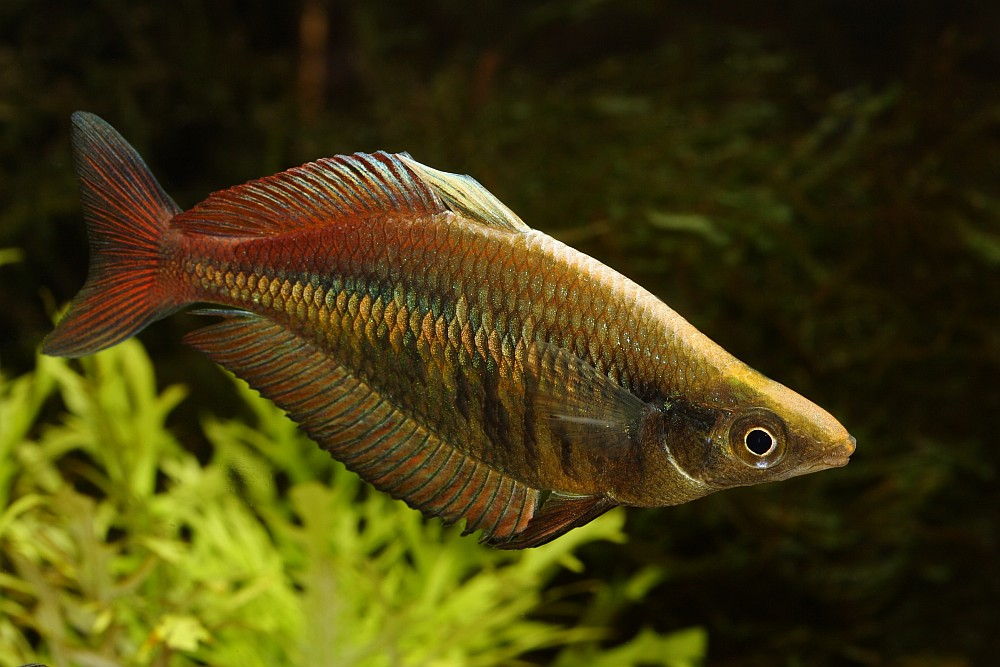
- Chilatherina fasciata male

Scientific classification
- Kingdom: Animalia
- Phylum: Chordata
- Class: Actinopterygii
- Order: Atheriniformes
- Family: Melanotaeniidae
- Genus: Chilatherina; Regan, 1914

Type species
- Rhombatractus fasciatus Weber, 1913

= Chilatherina =

Genus of fishes

Chilatherina is a genus of rainbowfishes that is endemic to freshwater in New Guinea.

== Species ==
There are currently 11 recognized species in this genus:

- Chilatherina alleni Price, 1997
- Chilatherina axelrodi G. R. Allen, 1979 (Axelrod's rainbowfish)
- Chilatherina bleheri G. R. Allen, 1985 (Bleher's rainbowfish)
- Chilatherina bulolo (Whitley, 1938) (Bulolo rainbowfish)
- Chilatherina campsi (Whitley, 1957) (Highlands rainbowfish)
- Chilatherina crassispinosa (M. C. W. Weber, 1913) (Silver rainbowfish)
- Chilatherina fasciata (M. C. W. Weber, 1913) (Barred rainbowfish)
- Chilatherina lorentzi (M. C. W. Weber, 1907) (Lorentz's rainbowfish)
- Chilatherina pagwiensis G. R. Allen & Unmack, 2012
- Chilatherina pricei G. R. Allen & Renyaan, 1996 (Price's rainbowfish)
- Chilatherina sentaniensis (M. C. W. Weber, 1907) (Sentani rainbowfish)
