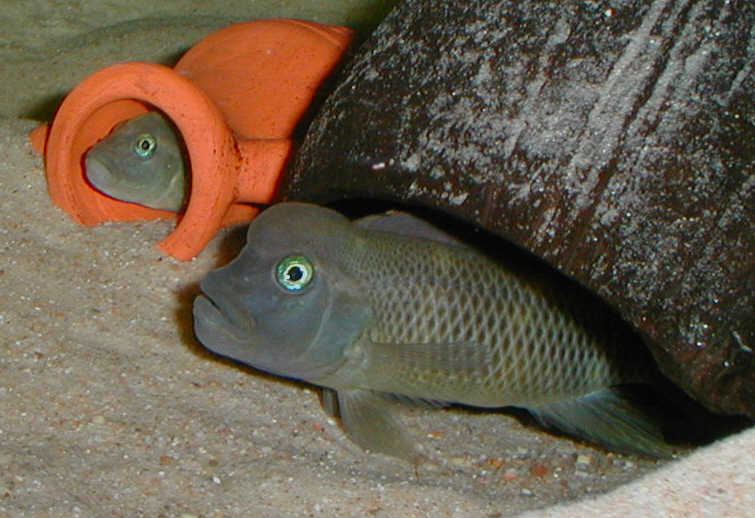

Conservation status
- Least Concern (IUCN 3.1)

Scientific classification
- Kingdom: Animalia
- Phylum: Chordata
- Class: Actinopterygii
- Order: Cichliformes
- Family: Cichlidae
- Genus: Steatocranus
- Species: S. casuarius

Binomial name
- Steatocranus casuarius Poll, 1939

= Lionhead cichlid =

Species of fish

The lionhead cichlid (Steatocranus casuarius), also known as African blockhead, buffalohead, humphead cichlid, lionhead or lumphead is a species of rheophilic cichlid native to Pool Malebo and the Congo River. It uses caves for spawning. This species can reach a length of 10 centimetres (3.9 in) TL. This species can also be found in the aquarium trade.
