= Leporinus altipinnis =

Conservation status
- Least Concern (IUCN 3.1)

Scientific classification
- Kingdom: Animalia
- Phylum: Chordata
- Class: Actinopterygii
- Order: Characiformes
- Family: Anostomidae
- Genus: Leporinus
- Species: L. altipinnis

Binomial name
- Leporinus altipinnis Borodin 1929

Synonyms
- Leporinus faciatus altipinnis Borodin, 1929; Leporinus falcipinnis Mahnert, Géry & Muller, 1997

Species of fish

Leporinus altipinnis is a species of ray-finned fish in the family Anostomidae, the toothed headstanders. It is found in the Iténez-Guaporé river basin of South America.
