= Leporinus bleheri =

Conservation status
- Data Deficient (IUCN 3.1)

Scientific classification
- Kingdom: Animalia
- Phylum: Chordata
- Class: Actinopterygii
- Order: Characiformes
- Family: Anostomidae
- Genus: Leporinus
- Species: L. bleheri

Binomial name
- Leporinus bleheri Géry 1999

Species of fish

Leporinus bleheri is a species of freshwater ray-finned fish belonging to the family Anostomidae, the toothed headstanders. It is found in the Iténez-Guaporé River basin in South America.

== Description ==
Leporinus bleheri can reach a standard length of 14.2 centimetres (5.6 in).

== Etymology ==
The species epithet is named in honor of the explorer and ornamental-fish wholesaler Heiko Bleher (b. 1944), who collected the type specimen.
