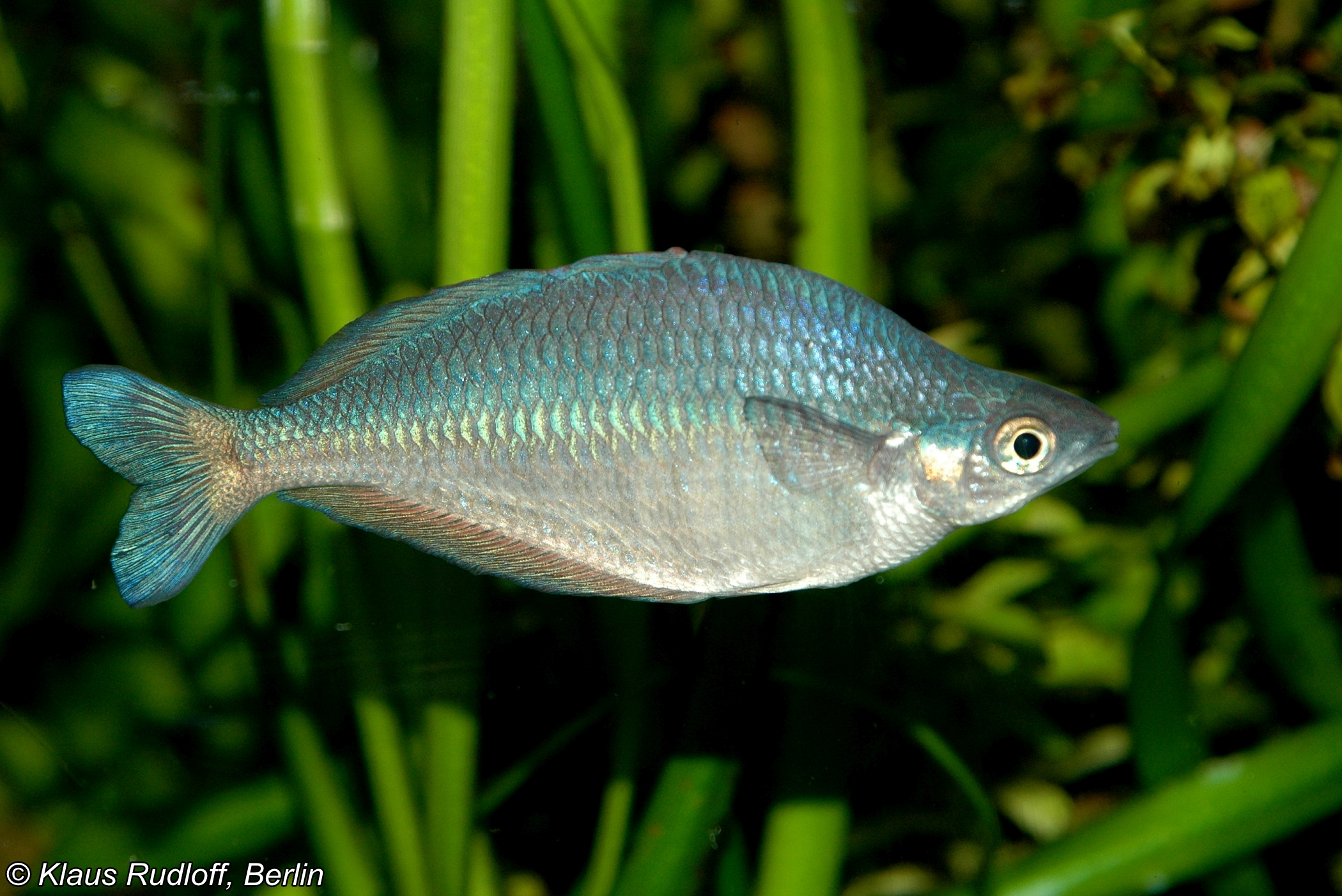

Conservation status
- Critically Endangered (IUCN 3.1)

Scientific classification
- Kingdom: Animalia
- Phylum: Chordata
- Class: Actinopterygii
- Order: Atheriniformes
- Family: Melanotaeniidae
- Genus: Chilatherina
- Species: C. sentaniensis

Binomial name
- Chilatherina sentaniensis (M. C. W. Weber, 1907)

Synonyms
- Rhombatractus sentaniensis Weber, 1907

= Sentani rainbowfish =

Species of fish

The Sentani rainbowfish (Chilatherina sentaniensis) is a critically endangered species of rainbowfish in the subfamily Melanotaeniinae. It is endemic to West Papua in Indonesia, where restricted to Lake Sentani (about 10 km west of Jayapura City) and its tributaries. It appears to have disappeared from the lake itself due to pollution and introduced species. Another rainbowfish, Glossolepis incisus has a similar range. Although a small population of the Sentani rainbowfish is maintained in captivity, it has frequently been confused with the closely related, more thickset C. fasciata.
