= Leporinus britskii =

Conservation status
- Least Concern (IUCN 3.1)

Scientific classification
- Kingdom: Animalia
- Phylum: Chordata
- Class: Actinopterygii
- Division: Teleostei
- Order: Characiformes
- Family: Anostomidae
- Genus: Leporinus
- Species: L. britskii

Binomial name
- Leporinus britskii Feitosa, G. M. dos Santos & Birindelli, 2011

Species of fish

Leporinus britskii is a species of freshwater ray-finned fish belonging to the family Anostomidae, the toothed headstanders. It is found in the Rio Tapajós and the Rio Jari drainages in Brazil.

== Description ==
Leporinus britskii reaches a standard length of 10.0 centimetres (3.9 in).

== Etymology ==
It is named in honor of Heraldo A. Britski of the Universidade de São Paulo, for his contribution to the knowledge of Neotropical fishes, and especially for his participation in the understanding of the taxonomy of the genus Leporinus.
