= Leporinus arimaspi =

Conservation status
- Least Concern (IUCN 3.1)

Scientific classification
- Kingdom: Animalia
- Phylum: Chordata
- Class: Actinopterygii
- Order: Characiformes
- Family: Anostomidae
- Genus: Leporinus
- Species: L. arimaspi

Binomial name
- Leporinus arimaspi Burns, Frable & Sidlauskas, 2014

Species of fish

Leporinus arimaspi is a species of freshwater ray-finned fish belonging to the family Anostomidae, the toothed headstanders. It is widely found throughout the Orinoco River drainage in Venezuela, including the tributaries Caura, Pamoni, Casiquiare, Manapiare, and Ventuari.

== Description ==
Leporinus arimaspi can reach a standard length of 19.0 centimetres (7.5 in).
