= Leporinus octofasciatus =

Conservation status
- Least Concern (IUCN 3.1)

Scientific classification
- Kingdom: Animalia
- Phylum: Chordata
- Class: Actinopterygii
- Order: Characiformes
- Family: Anostomidae
- Genus: Leporinus
- Species: L. octofasciatus

Binomial name
- Leporinus octofasciatus Steindachner 1915

Species of fish

Leporinus octofasciatus is a species of freshwater ray-finned fish belonging to the family Anostomidae, the toothed headstanders. It is found in the northern Cubatão River in Santa Catarina and the upper Paraná River basin in Brazil.

== Description ==
Leporinus octofasciatus can reach a standard length of 31.2 centimetres (12.3 in).
