= Leporinus leschenaulti =

Scientific classification
- Kingdom: Animalia
- Phylum: Chordata
- Class: Actinopterygii
- Order: Characiformes
- Family: Anostomidae
- Genus: Leporinus
- Species: L. leschenaulti

Binomial name
- Leporinus leschenaulti Valenciennes, 1850

Species of fish

Leporinus leschenaulti is a species of freshwater ray-finned fish belonging to the family Anostomidae, the toothed headstanders. It is found in coastal rivers of French Guiana and northern Brazil.

== Etymology ==
It is named in honor of botanist-ornithologist Jean-Baptiste Louis Claude Theodore Leschenault de La Tour (1773–1826), who, along with entomologist Adolphe Jacques Louis Doumerc (1802–1868), provided the type specimen.
