= László Magyar =

László Magyar (1818–1864) was a Hungarian explorer and map-maker of Southwest Africa.

== Biography ==
László Magyar was born on November 13, 1818, in Szombathely, Hungary, and lived 17 years in Ponte de Cuio, Angola, where he died on November 9, 1864. His geographical explorations, as well as his ethnological research, were supported by his father-in-law, the king of Bié. The king's relations, as well as his donation of 300 slaves, enabled Magyar to go on six exploring journeys in Angola. Unlike other European travellers, he did not only explore one area, but also described the life of the people living there. The African people called him "Mister What-Is-This", because he always asked them questions about his interests: the local people, their habits and the way they administered themselves. Magyar spent over a decade living among the native people and learning their languages.

In 1848 the Hungarian ascended the Congo River to the Yellala Falls, before spending five years exploring the region to the south.

== Travels in Africa ==
Apart from a few major essays, his travels in Africa became known through his diary fragments and letters. No matter how valuable and interesting they are, they cannot compensate for an expert, scientific report of his observations. Since these fragments and sketches were often written in a hurry and the experiences were not always reported in a well-organised form, it was easy to find mistakes and contradictions in them, so soon reviews became less favourable and László Magyar's reports were regarded as unreliable. Magyar may have been a good sailor but the study of his maps demonstrates that his knowledge of geography was fairly poor. Consequently, his maps are distorted and August Petermann had to redraw Magyar's maps based on reliable determinations of position before he had published the map of the Hungarian explorer's first big inland journey. He kept the original watercourses and his routes untouched and shortened the distances proportionately.

== Sources ==
- Kalumvueziko, Ngimbi (2009). Congo-Zaïre: le destin tragique d'une nation (in French). Editions L'Harmattan. ISBN 978-2-296-09607-3.
