= Leporinus tristriatus =

Conservation status
- Least Concern (IUCN 3.1)

Scientific classification
- Kingdom: Animalia
- Phylum: Chordata
- Class: Actinopterygii
- Order: Characiformes
- Family: Anostomidae
- Genus: Leporinus
- Species: L. tristriatus

Binomial name
- Leporinus tristriatus Birindelli & Britski, 2013

Species of fish

Leporinus tristriatus is a species of freshwater ray-finned fish belonging to the family Anostomidae, the toothed headstanders. It is found in the Amazon basin in Brazil.

== Etymology ==
The species epithet is formed from tri- meaning three; and striatus, meaning striped, referring to the three dark stripes on the body.
