= Leporinus trimaculatus =

Conservation status
- Least Concern (IUCN 3.1)

Scientific classification
- Kingdom: Animalia
- Phylum: Chordata
- Class: Actinopterygii
- Order: Characiformes
- Family: Anostomidae
- Genus: Leporinus
- Species: L. trimaculatus

Binomial name
- Leporinus trimaculatus Garavello & G. M. dos Santos, 1992

Species of fish

Leporinus trimaculatus is a species of freshwater ray-finned fish belonging to the family Anostomidae, the toothed headstanders. It is found in the Aripuanã River basin in Brazil.

== Description ==
Leporinus trimaculatus can reach a standard length of 23.2 centimetres (9.1 in).
