= Alestopetersius bleheri =

Conservation status
- Data Deficient (IUCN 3.1)

Scientific classification
- Kingdom: Animalia
- Phylum: Chordata
- Class: Actinopterygii
- Order: Characiformes
- Family: Alestidae
- Genus: Alestopetersius
- Species: A. bleheri

Binomial name
- Alestopetersius bleheri (Géry, 1995)

Synonyms
- Phenacogrammus bleheri Géry, 1955

Species of fish

Alestopetersius bleheri is a species of freshwater ray-finned fish belonging to the family Alestidae, the African tetras. It is known only from a small tributary of the Bari River in the Lua River system in the Ubangi River drainage, in the middle Congo River basin in the Democratic Republic of the Congo.

== Description ==
Alestopetersius bleheri reaches a standard length of 6.3 cm (2.5 in).

== Etymology ==
Alestopetersius bleheri is named in honor of explorer and ornamental fish wholesaler Heiko Bleher, who provided many specimens for Géry's study, including the type specimen of this species.
