= Leporinus guttatus =

Conservation status
- Vulnerable (IUCN 3.1)

Scientific classification
- Kingdom: Animalia
- Phylum: Chordata
- Class: Actinopterygii
- Order: Characiformes
- Family: Anostomidae
- Genus: Leporinus
- Species: L. guttatus

Binomial name
- Leporinus guttatus Birindelli & Britski, 2009

Species of fish

Leporinus guttatus is a species of freshwater ray-finned fish belonging to the family Anostomidae, the toothed headstanders. It is found in the upper Curuá River, of the Xingu River basin in Serra do Cachimbo, Brazil.

== Description ==
Leporinus guttatus can reach a standard length of 12.5 centimetres (4.9 in).
