= Bulolo rainbowfish =

Conservation status
- Least Concern (IUCN 3.1)

Scientific classification
- Kingdom: Animalia
- Phylum: Chordata
- Class: Actinopterygii
- Order: Atheriniformes
- Family: Melanotaeniidae
- Genus: Chilatherina
- Species: C. bulolo

Binomial name
- Chilatherina bulolo (Whitley, 1938)

Species of fish

The bulolo rainbowfish (Chilatherina bulolo) is a species of rainbowfish in the subfamily Melanotaeniinae. Bulolo Rainbowfish are found in the fast flowing, rapid water of the mountain streams in the Markham and Ramu river systems of north-eastern Papua New Guinea. It was first collected in 1934 and then not again until 1978.

== Sources ==
- Ryan Junghenn Aquarium Fish Experts
