= Leporinus bistriatus =

Conservation status
- Near Threatened (IUCN 3.1)

Scientific classification
- Kingdom: Animalia
- Phylum: Chordata
- Class: Actinopterygii
- Order: Characiformes
- Family: Anostomidae
- Genus: Leporinus
- Species: L. bistriatus

Binomial name
- Leporinus bistriatus Britski, 1997

Species of fish

Leporinus bistriatus is a species of freshwater ray-finned fish belonging to the family Anostomidae, the toothed headstanders. It is found in the Tocantins River basin of Brazil.

== Description ==
Leporinus bistriatus can reach a standard length of 11.1 centimetres (4.4 in).
