= Leporinus unitaeniatus =

Conservation status
- Least Concern (IUCN 3.1)

Scientific classification
- Kingdom: Animalia
- Phylum: Chordata
- Class: Actinopterygii
- Order: Characiformes
- Family: Anostomidae
- Genus: Leporinus
- Species: L. unitaeniatus

Binomial name
- Leporinus unitaeniatus Garavello & G. M. dos Santos, 2009

Species of fish

Leporinus unitaeniatus is a species of freshwater ray-finned fish belonging to the family Anostomidae, the toothed headstanders. It is found in the Araguaia River and Tocantins River, Brazil.

== Description ==
Leporinus unitaeniatus can reach a standard length of 12.5 centimetres (4.9 in).
