= Bleher's rainbowfish =

Conservation status
- Endangered (IUCN 3.1)

Scientific classification
- Domain: Eukaryota
- Kingdom: Animalia
- Phylum: Chordata
- Class: Actinopterygii
- Order: Atheriniformes
- Family: Melanotaeniidae
- Genus: Chilatherina
- Species: C. bleheri

Binomial name
- Chilatherina bleheri G. R. Allen, 1985

Species of fish

Bleher's rainbowfish (Chilatherina bleheri) is a species of rainbowfish in the subfamily Melanotaeniinae.

== Etymology ==
It is named in honor of Heiko Bleher, a German botanist and ichthyologist.

== Distribution and habitat ==
Bleher's rainbowfish is found in Lake Holmes in the lower Mamberamo system of West Papua in Indonesia. With a preference for shallow, abundant plant life, this rainbowfish lives in a foothill region surrounded by jungle.
