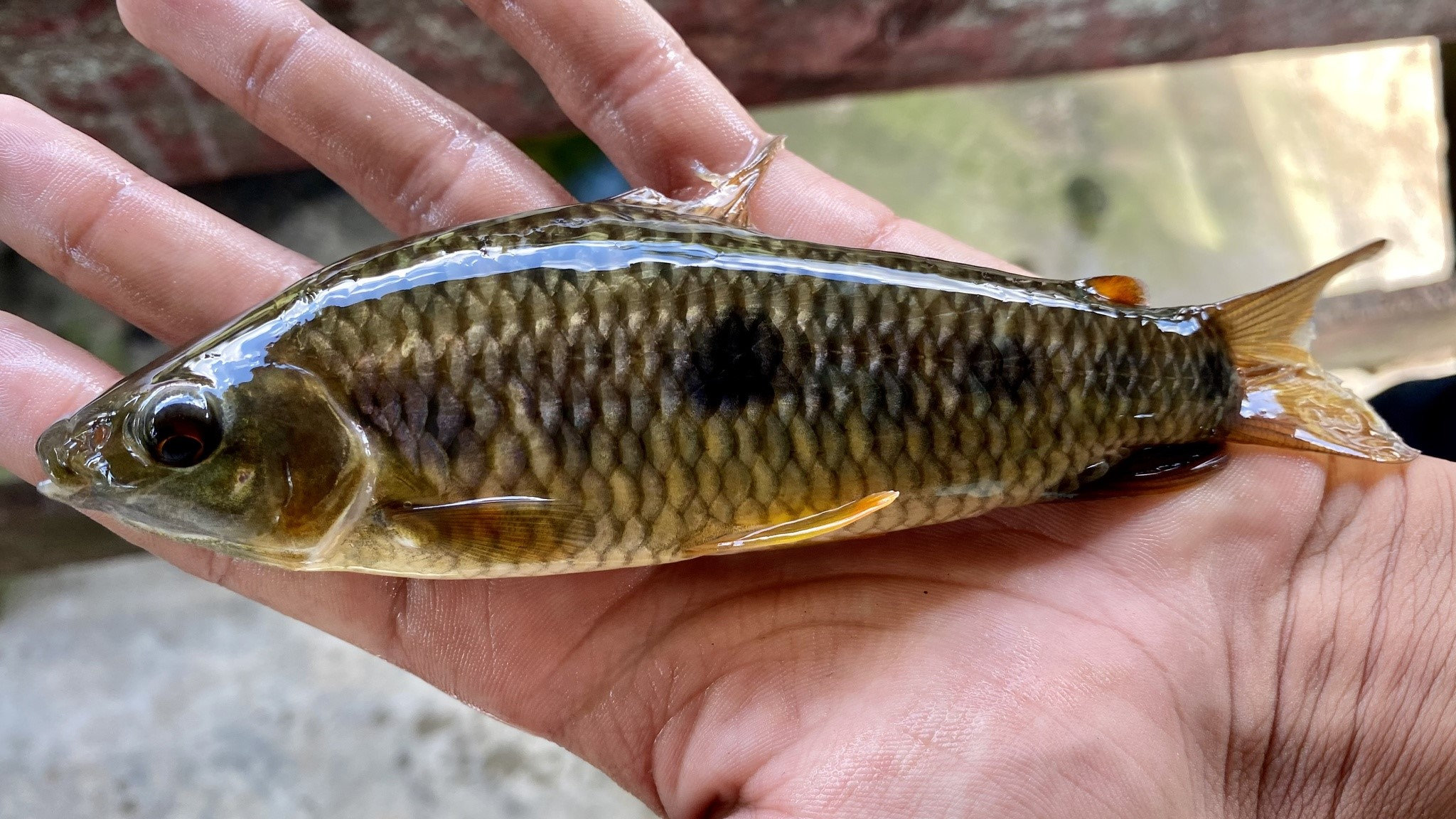

Conservation status
- Least Concern (IUCN 3.1)

Scientific classification
- Kingdom: Animalia
- Phylum: Chordata
- Class: Actinopterygii
- Order: Characiformes
- Family: Anostomidae
- Genus: Leporinus
- Species: L. bahiensis

Binomial name
- Leporinus bahiensis Steindachner 1875

= Leporinus bahiensis =

Species of fish

Leporinus bahiensis is a species of freshwater ray-finned fish belonging to the family Anostomidae, the toothed headstanders. It is found in Bahia, Brazil.
