= Leporinus reticulatus =

Conservation status
- Least Concern (IUCN 3.1)

Scientific classification
- Kingdom: Animalia
- Phylum: Chordata
- Class: Actinopterygii
- Order: Characiformes
- Family: Anostomidae
- Genus: Leporinus
- Species: L. reticulatus

Binomial name
- Leporinus reticulatus Britski & Garavello, 1993

Species of fish

Leporinus reticulatus is a species of freshwater ray-finned fish belonging to the family Anostomidae, the toothed headstanders. This fish is found in the Arinos River basin in the Tapajós River drainage in Brazil.

== Description ==
Leporinus reticulatus can reach a standard length of 13.6 centimetres (5.4 in).
