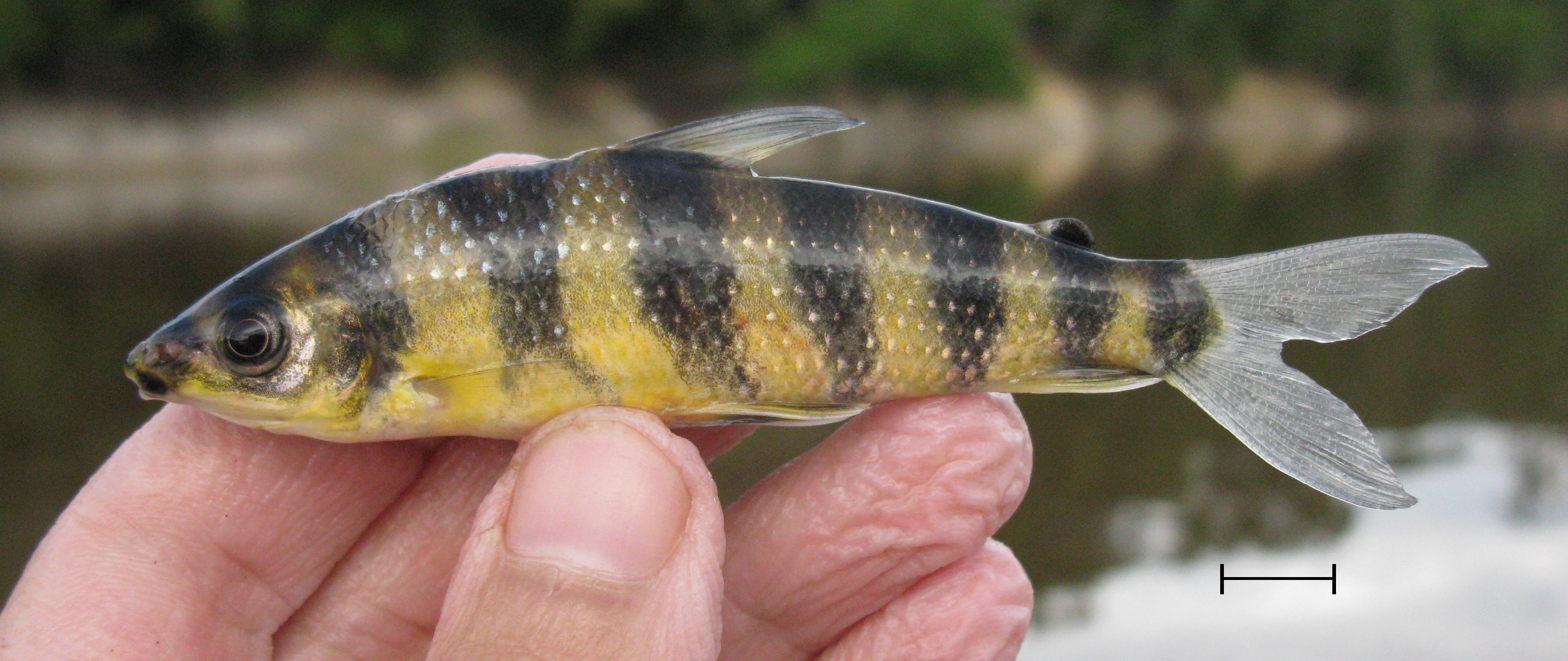

Conservation status
- Least Concern (IUCN 3.1)

Scientific classification
- Kingdom: Animalia
- Phylum: Chordata
- Class: Actinopterygii
- Order: Characiformes
- Family: Anostomidae
- Genus: Leporinus
- Species: L. enyae

Binomial name
- Leporinus enyae Burns, Chatfield, Birindelli, & Sidlauskas 2017

= Leporinus enyae =

Species of fish

Leporinus enyae is a species of freshwater ray-finned fish belonging to the family Anostomidae, the toothed headstanders. This species was first described in 2017 from the Orinoco River drainage area. It is named after the Irish singer Enya, whose major music hit "Orinoco Flow" deals with the Orinoco River, among others.
