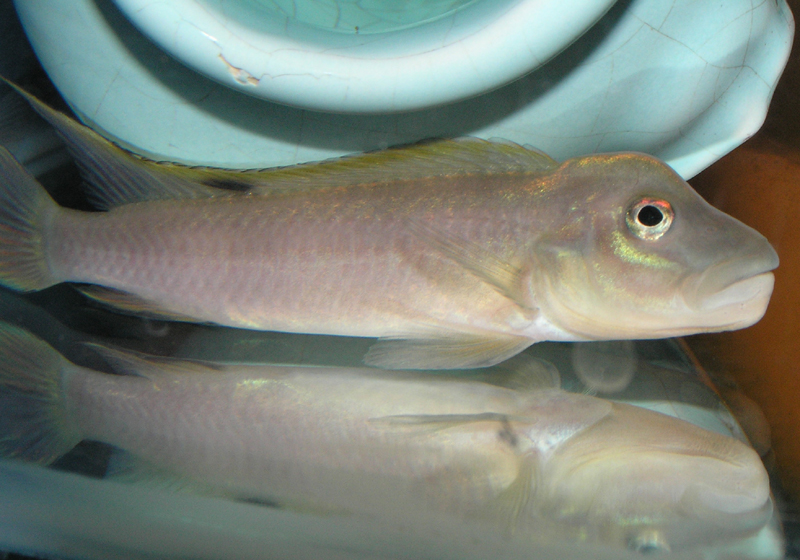
- S. tinanti

Scientific classification
- Kingdom: Animalia
- Phylum: Chordata
- Class: Actinopterygii
- Order: Cichliformes
- Family: Cichlidae
- Subfamily: Pseudocrenilabrinae
- Tribe: Steatocranini; Dunz & Schliewen, 2013
- Genus: Steatocranus; Boulenger, 1899

Type species
- Steatocranus gibbiceps Boulenger, 1899

= Steatocranus =

Genus of fishes

Steatocranus is a genus of small rheophilic cichlids mostly native to the Congo River Basin in DR Congo/Congo Brazzaville, although one species, S. irvinei, is restricted to the Volta River in Ghana and Burkino Faso, and it belongs in a separate genus. There are also at least c. 10 undescribed species in the Congo River basin awaiting scientific description.

The fish in this genus all have relatively reduced swim bladder function. The name Steatocranus refers to the fatty deposit on the forehead of most species.

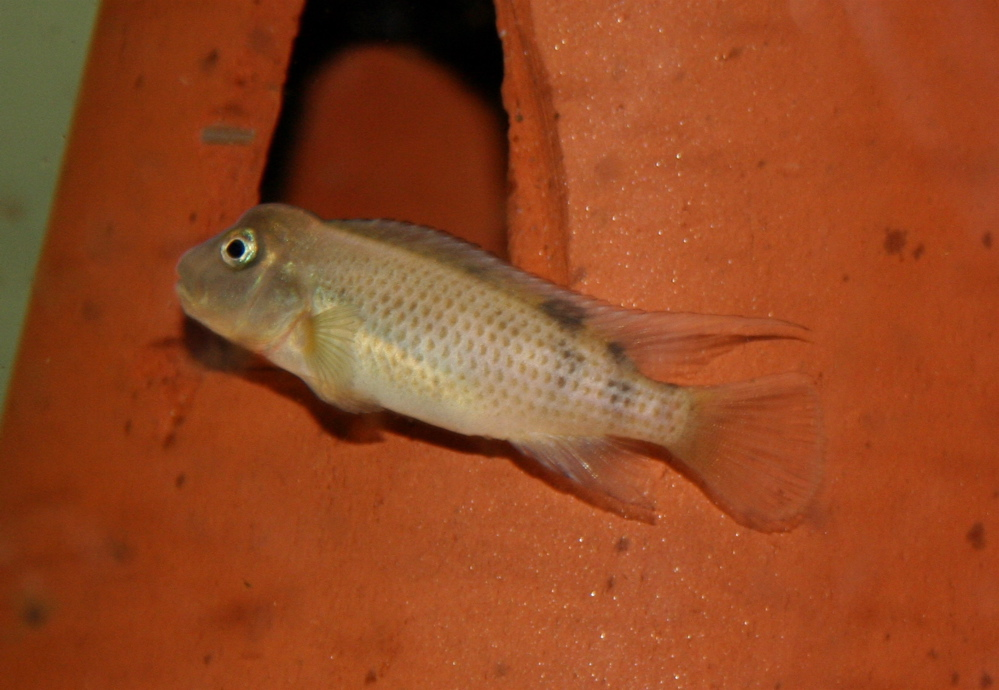
Young female Steatocranus casuarius

Two species, S. casuarius (also known as the lionhead or buffalohead cichlid) and S. tinanti are relatively common in the aquarium trade.

As for other cichlids brood care is highly developed and both sexes are involved in raising the young. All Steatocranus species are secretive cave spawners and form monogamous pairs for breeding. The female is more actively involved in fry raising, while the male is primarily concerned with territorial defence.

== Species ==
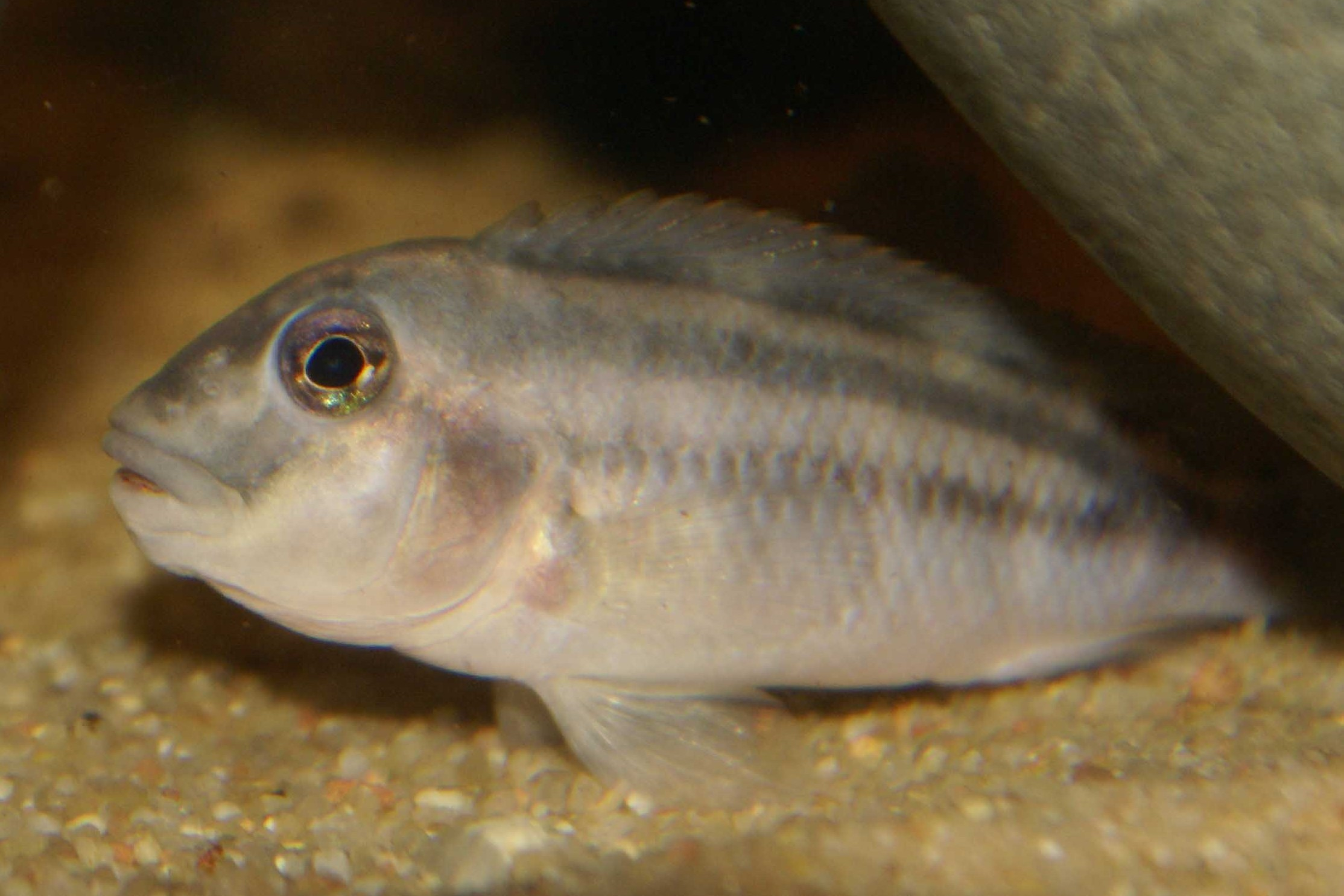
Young male Steatocranus bleheri

There are currently eight recognized species in this genus, but S. irvinei belongs elsewhere; in 2019 it was proposed to move it to its own genus, Paragobiocichla.

- Steatocranus bleheri M. K. Meyer, 1993
- Steatocranus casuarius Poll, 1939 (Lionhead cichlid)
- Steatocranus gibbiceps Boulenger, 1899
- Steatocranus glaber T. R. Roberts & D. J. Stewart, 1976
- Steatocranus masalamasoso Zamba, Weiss, Mamonekene, Schliewen & Vreven, 2022
- Steatocranus mpozoensis T. R. Roberts & D. J. Stewart, 1976
- Steatocranus rouxi (Pellegrin, 1928)
- Steatocranus tinanti (Poll, 1939)
- Steatocranus ubanguiensis T. R. Roberts & D. J. Stewart, 1976
