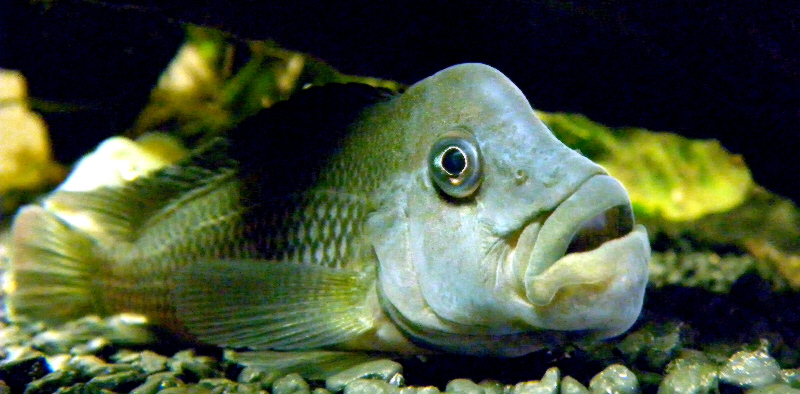

Conservation status
- Least Concern (IUCN 3.1)

Scientific classification
- Kingdom: Animalia
- Phylum: Chordata
- Class: Actinopterygii
- Order: Cichliformes
- Family: Cichlidae
- Genus: Steatocranus
- Species: S. gibbiceps

Binomial name
- Steatocranus gibbiceps Boulenger, 1899

= Steatocranus gibbiceps =

Species of fish

Steatocranus gibbiceps is species of cichlid native to the Malebo Pool and lower parts of the Congo River in Africa. This species can reach a length of 10 centimetres (3.9 in) TL.
