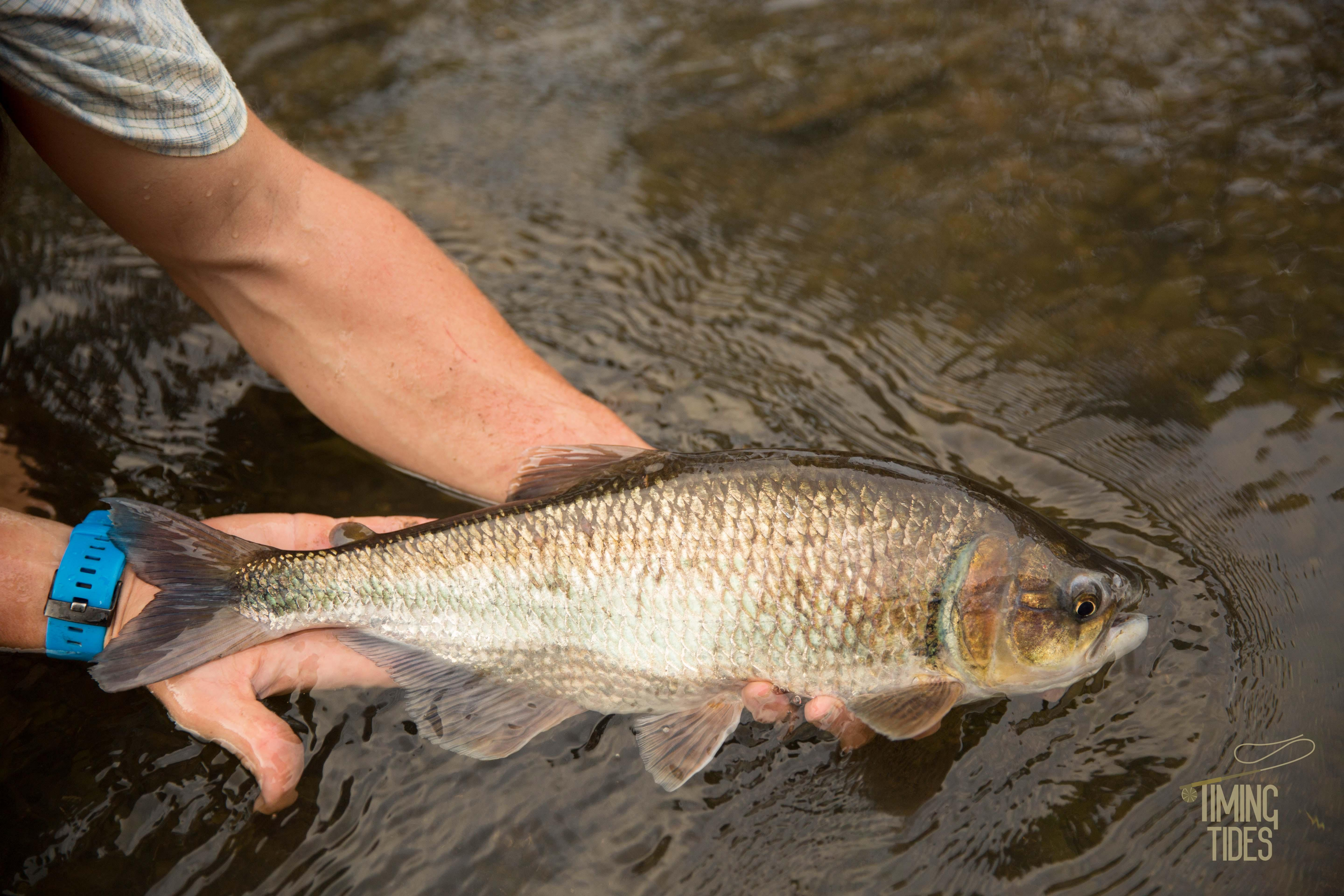

Conservation status
- Least Concern (IUCN 3.1)

Scientific classification
- Kingdom: Animalia
- Phylum: Chordata
- Class: Actinopterygii
- Order: Characiformes
- Family: Bryconidae
- Genus: Brycon
- Species: B. costaricensis

Binomial name
- Brycon costaricensis Angulo & Gracian-Negrete, 2013

= Brycon costaricensis =

Species of fish

Brycon costaricenisis, the Costa Rican brycon or machaca, is a species of freshwater ray-finned fish belonging to the family Bryconidae, the doradas and jaw characins. This species is found in Central America.

== Taxonomy ==
Brycon costaricenisis was first formally described in 2013 by the Costa Rican ichthyologist Arturo Angulo and the Mexican ichthyologist Jatziry Marlene Gracian-Negrete, with its type locality given as "Atlantic slope, Heredia, Sarapiquí drainage, La Virgen de Sarapiquí, Río Sarapiquí, at the Tirimbina Biological Reserve, 10°24'56.84"N, 84°07'18.70"W, Costa Rica, altitude 149 meters". This taxon had previously been considered to be a disjunct population of B. guatemalensis, but was shown to have distinct morphometrics and meristics. This species is classified B. striatulus species group within the genus Brycon, which is classified within the subfamily Bryconinae of the family Bryconidae in the suborder Characoidei of the order Characiformes.

== Etymology ==
Brycon costaricenisis belongs to the genus Brycon. This name is derived from the Greek brýchō (βρύχω), which means "to bite", "gnash teeth" or "eat greedily", thought to be an allusion to the fully toothed maxillae of the type species, B. falcatus. The specific name refers to Costa Rica, where the type locality is.

== Description ==
Brycon costaricensis may be distinguished from its Mesoamerican congeners by having between 49 and 54 scales in the lateral line, more than in B. argenteus and less than in any other species. The anal fin is clearly longer than the head, whereas in other species it is roughly equal in length to the head. Compared to B. guatemalensis this species has different scale row counts as well as an elongated and shallow caudal peduncle. The overall color is silvery, with the blackish edges of some scales creating vertical streaks, the back is dark olive, and the belly is white. The rear margin of the operculum is black. The pectoral and pelvic fins are transparent, light pink or reddish in juveniles, and rosy gray or dark in adults. The dorsal and adipose fins are light pink, yellowish or reddish in juveniles, and in adults they are rosy gray or dark. There is a variably distinct blackish spot on the caudal peduncle and, the caudal fin is pale pink, yellowish, reddish, mainly in juveniles, or dark in most adults. The anal and caudal fins typically have dark edges. This species has a maximum total length of 59 cm (23 in).

== Distribution and habitat ==
Brycon costaricensis is found in southern central America on the Atlantic slope of Nicaragua and Costa Rica. Its range extends from the Wawa River system in northern Nicaragua to the Matina River in southern Costa Rica. This species has been recorded from the Prinzapolka, Escondido, Sabagol, San Carlos, Sarapiqui, Tortuguero, Pacuare and Matina rivers, it also occurs in rivers draining into Lake Nicaragua. It occurs in lakes, rivers and creeks with slow to high flows.
