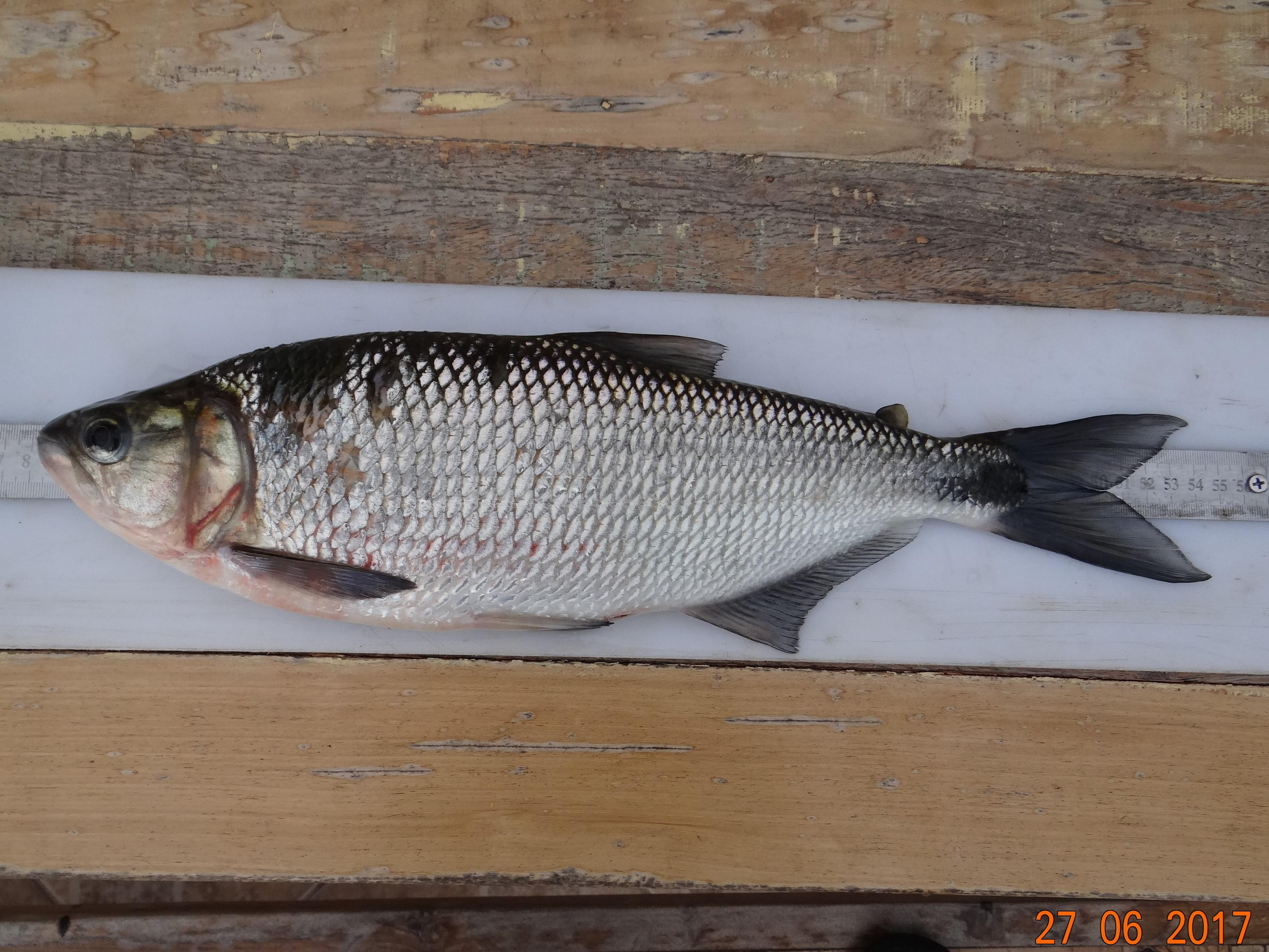

Conservation status
- Endangered (IUCN 3.1)

Scientific classification
- Kingdom: Animalia
- Phylum: Chordata
- Class: Actinopterygii
- Order: Characiformes
- Family: Bryconidae
- Genus: Brycon
- Species: B. insignis

Binomial name
- Brycon insignis Steindachner, 1877

Synonyms
- Catabasis acuminatus C. H. Eigenmann & A. A. Norris, 1900; Brycon acuminatus C. H. Eigenmann & A. A. Norris, 1900); Megalobrycon piabanha A. de Miranda Ribeiro, 1902

= Brycon insignis =

Species of fish

Brycon insignis, the Tiete tetra, is a species of species of freshwater ray-finned fish belonging to the family Bryconidae, the doradas and jaw tetras. It is endemic to the Paraíba do Sul River basin in southeast Brazil. B. insignis migrates upstream to spawn and has traditionally been important to fisheries, but it is now a threatened species.

== Taxonomy ==
Bryson insignis was first formally described in 1877 by the Austrian ichthyologist Franz Steindachner, with its type locality given as "Rio Parahyba at Campos and Mendez" in Brazil. This species is classified in the genus Brycon, which is classified within the subfamily Bryconinae of the family Bryconidae in the suborder Characoidei of the order Characiformes.

Some authorities recognize B. acuminatus as a separate, possibly extinct species, but recent authorities treat it as a synonym of B. insignis.

== Etymology ==
Brycon insignis belongs to the genus Brycon. This name is derived from the Greek brýchō (βρύχω), which means "to bite", "gnash teeth" or "eat greedily", thought to be an allusion to the fully toothed maxillae of the type species, B. falcatus. The specific name, insignis, is Latin and means "remarkable" or "notable". Steindachner did not explain this name, but he did note in his description that this species was notable among its then known congeners in the thin and well spaced teeth, with the second row of teeth adjacent ro the symphysis of the dentary, then thought to be a feature of fishes in the genus Brycon, being frequently absent.

== Description ==
Brycon insignis has a maximum standard length of 36.9 cm (14.5 in).

== Distribution and habitat ==
Brycon insignis is endemic to Brazil, where it was originally found in the drainages of the Paraíba do Sul, Itabapoana and Itapemirim rivers. Historically, this fish was found in the Grande River system, which drains into Guanabara Bay, Imbé River, which runs into Feia Lagoon, the Macaé River, the São João River, and the Itabapoana River, all separate river systems close to the drainage of the Paraíba do Sul. There have been no records from the Macaé in recent years, and it is likely extinct in the Grande, not having been recorded since the early 20th century. No wild populations have been found in the sections of the Paraíba do Sul within São Paulo. However, fish have been captured in the Paraibuna reservoir, probably introduced in a restocking effort. In Espírito Santo this species occurs only in the Itapemirim. This is a benthopelagic species.

== Biology ==
Brycon insignis feeds on fishes and insects when young, occasionally feeding on leaves, flowers, fruits, and seeds. However, the adults are largely vegetarian, eating leaves and fruit, with a few insects and small fishes. The spawning period runs from December and February. The females attain sexual maturity at 25 cm (9.8 in) when they are three years old, while the males reach it at 20 cm (7.9 in) after two years.

== Conservation ==
Brycon insignis is endemic to southeastern Brazil in the states of São Paulo, Rio de Janeiro and Espírito Santo. It has decreased in range, with natural subpopulations persisting in the Rio de Janeiro section of the Paraíba do Sul and its tributaries, the Imbé River, the Itabapoana River on the border between Rio de Janeiro and Espírito Santo, and the São João River on the Rio de Janeiro coast. In many of these drainages they are threatened by hydroelectric dams being built. This species faces threats from habitat degradation, deforestation, pollution, the introduction of invasive species, e.g. Salminus brasiliensis, and the construction of hydroelectric dams. These threats and its small range have led the International Union for Conservation of Nature to list this species as Endangered.
