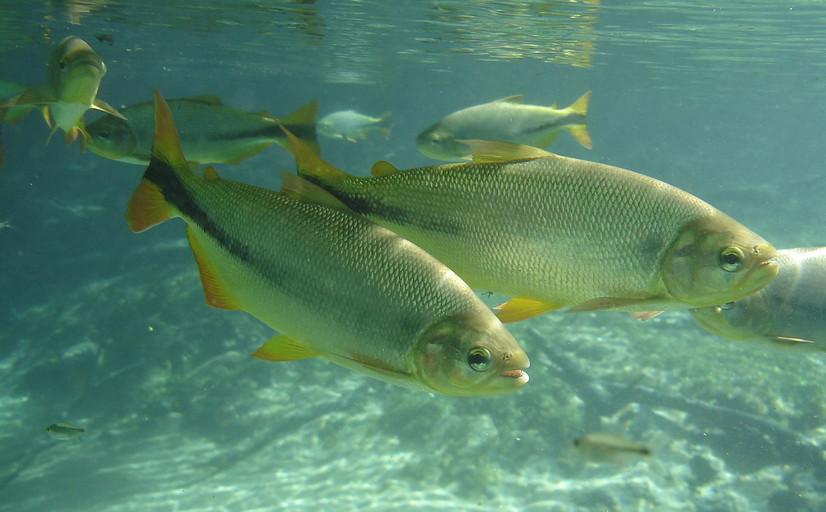
- Brycon hilarii

Scientific classification
- Kingdom: Animalia
- Phylum: Chordata
- Class: Actinopterygii
- Division: Teleostei
- Order: Characiformes
- Family: Bryconidae
- Subfamily: Bryconinae
- Genus: Brycon; J. P. Müller & Troschel, 1844

Type species
- Brycon falcatus J. P. Müller & Troschel, 1844

Synonyms
- Chalcinopsis Kner, 1863; Megalobrycon Günther, 1869; Catabasis C. H. Eigenmann & A. A. Norris, 1900; Othonophanes C. H. Eigenmann, 1903; Bryconodon C. H. Eigenmann, 1903; Triurobrycon C. H. Eigenmann, 1909; Holobrycon C. H. Eigenmann, 1909

= Brycon =

Brycon Temporal range: Oligocene to present

Genus of fishes

Brycon is a genus of freshwater ray-finned fishes belonging to the family Bryconidae, and order Characiformes. The fishes in this genus are found in Central and South America, ranging from southern Mexico to northern Argentina. Despite not being closely related to true trout, they are sometimes called South American trout. Members of the genus may be referred to by a number of other different common names in various languages. They reach a maximum length of 11.9–79.5 cm (4.7–31.3 in), depending on the species involved. Some species perform seasonal breeding migrations.

They feed heavily on fruits and seeds, but also take other plant material, invertebrates, and small fish. Their food is typically taken from the water, but they are able to jump out of the water to "pluck" low-hanging seeds and fruits directly from trees. Some seeds are crushed when eaten, but may also pass undamaged through the fish, making them seed dispersers.

Brycon support important fisheries, and, based on a review by IBAMA, they are the fifth most caught fish by weight in the Brazilian Amazon.

One fossil member of this genus is known in †Brycon avus (Woodward, 1898) from the Oligocene-aged Tremembé Formation of Brazil. A slightly older potential specimen of B. avus is also known from the Late Eocene/Early Oligocene of the Aiuruoca Basin.

== Taxonomy ==
Cladistically, Brycon is a non-monophyletic genus; some of the species in this genus are actually genetically and morphologically closer to Chilobrycon and Henochilus than to the type species, Brycon falcatus. Thus, phylogenetic analyses using cladistics have rendered Brycon to be paraphyletic or even polyphyletic, and have recommended taxonomic review of the genus. The clades within Brycon are grouped based on biogeographic evidence: in prehistory, vicariance lead to the speciation of a trans-Andean "Pacific clade" which also inhabits Central America; the other major clade is the cis-Andean + Magdalena-Cauca Basin clade which includes Brycon falcatus. The latter clades with species of Salminus and thus are closer to them than they are to the other Brycon clade.

=== Species ===
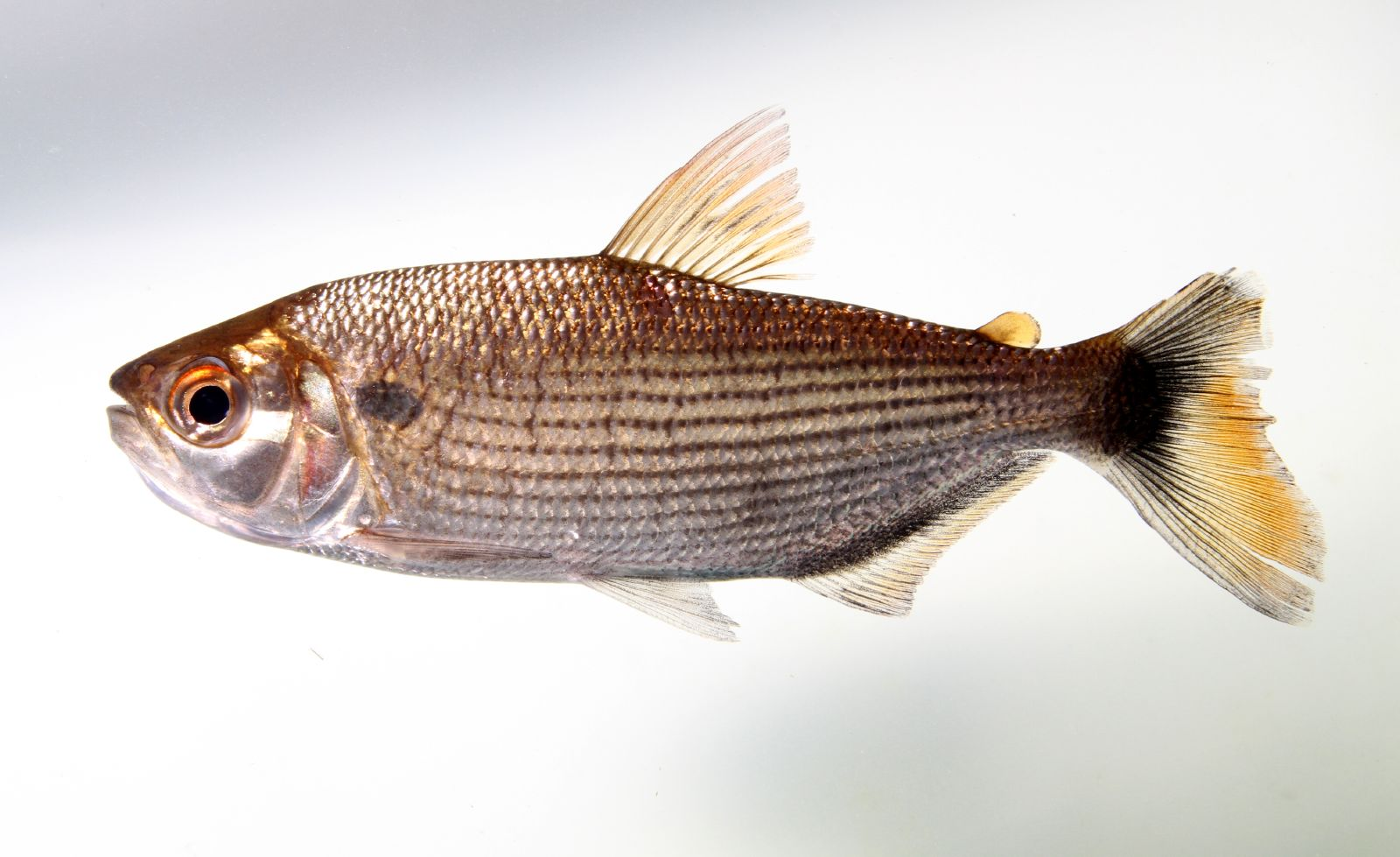
Brycon cf. amazonicus

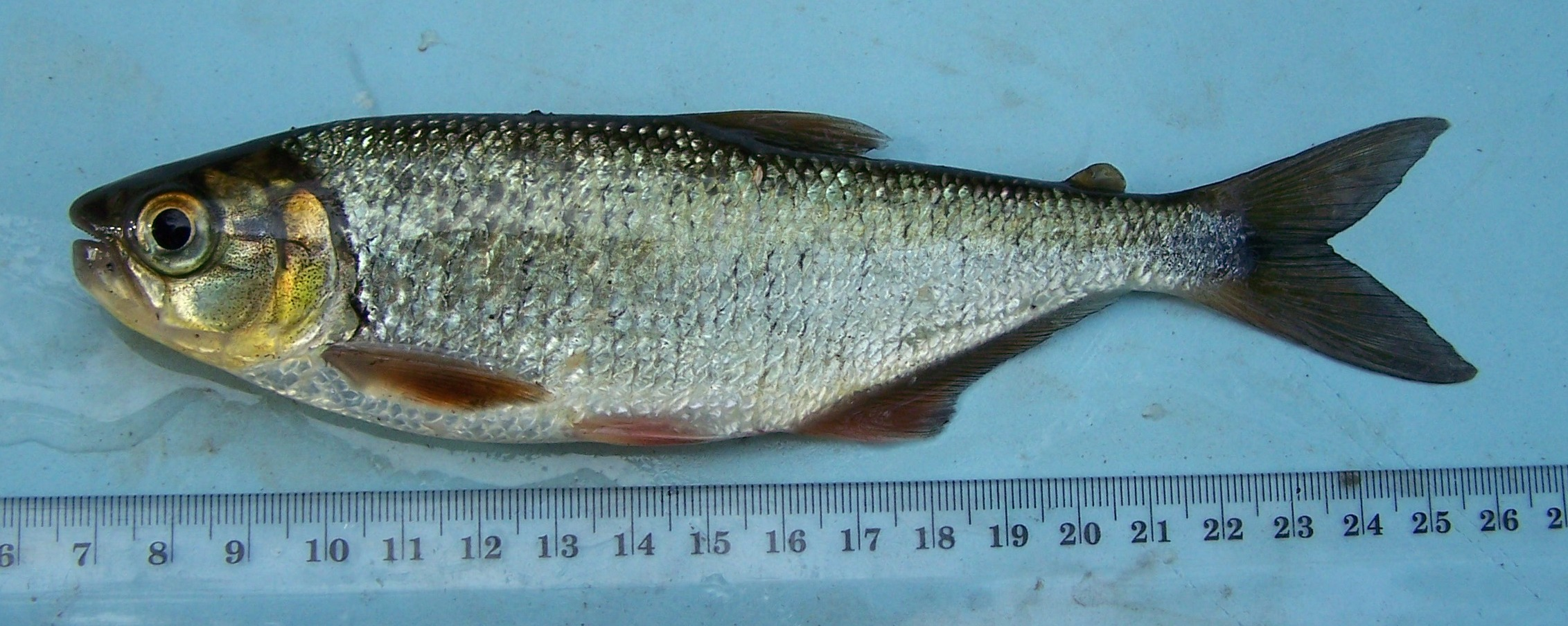
Brycon behreae

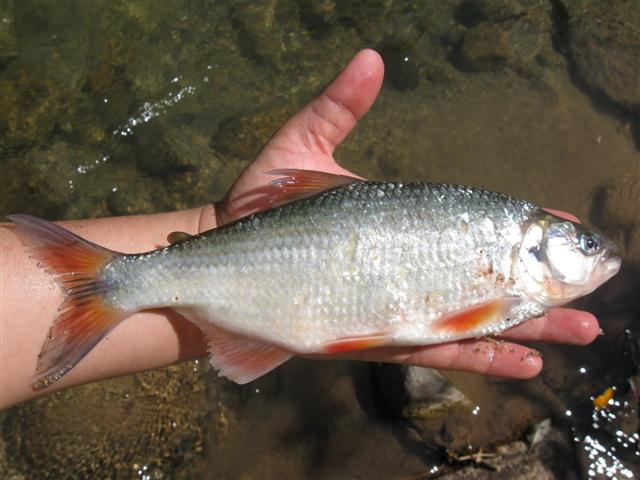
Brycon henni

Brycon hilarii

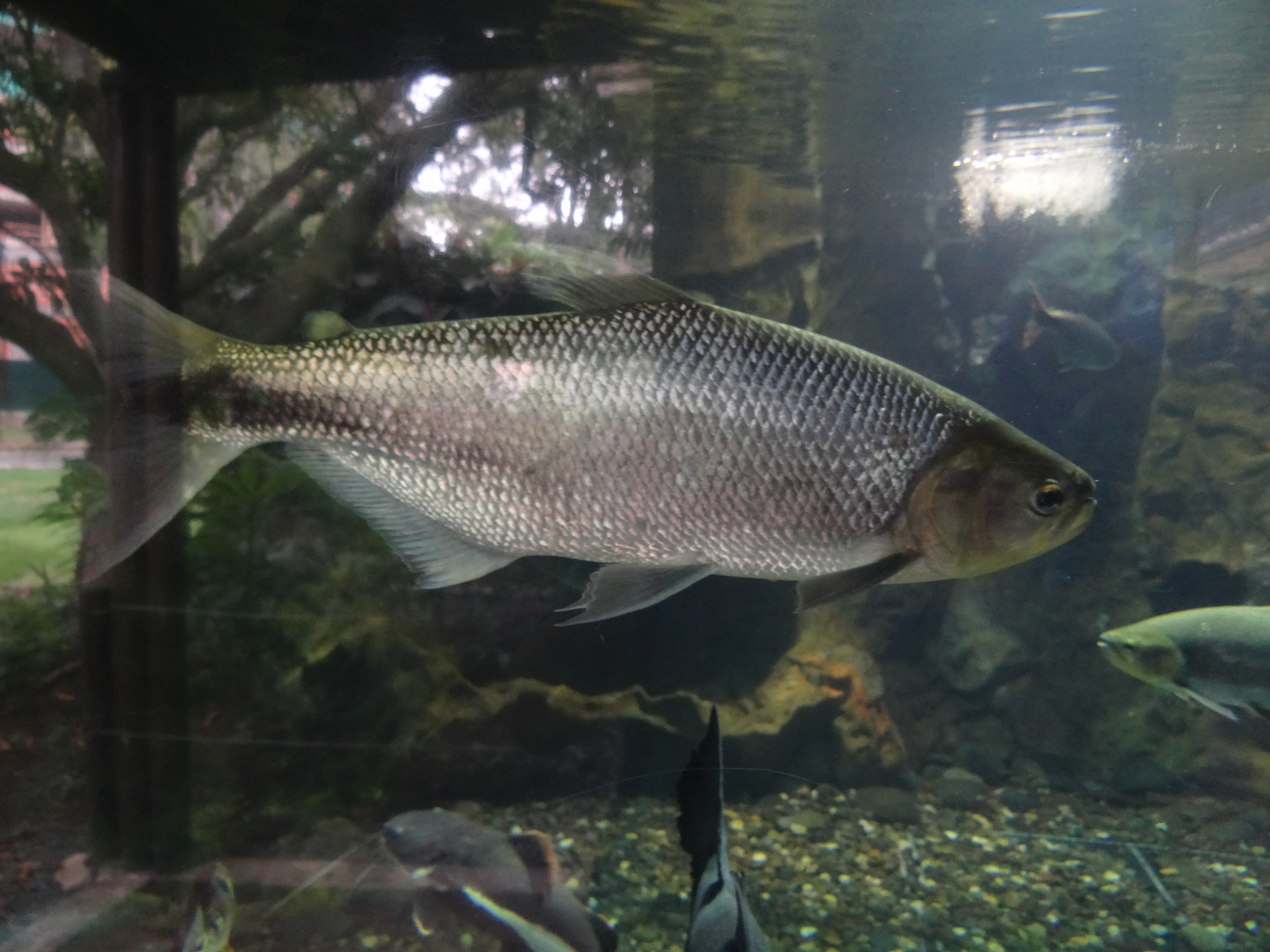
Brycon moorei

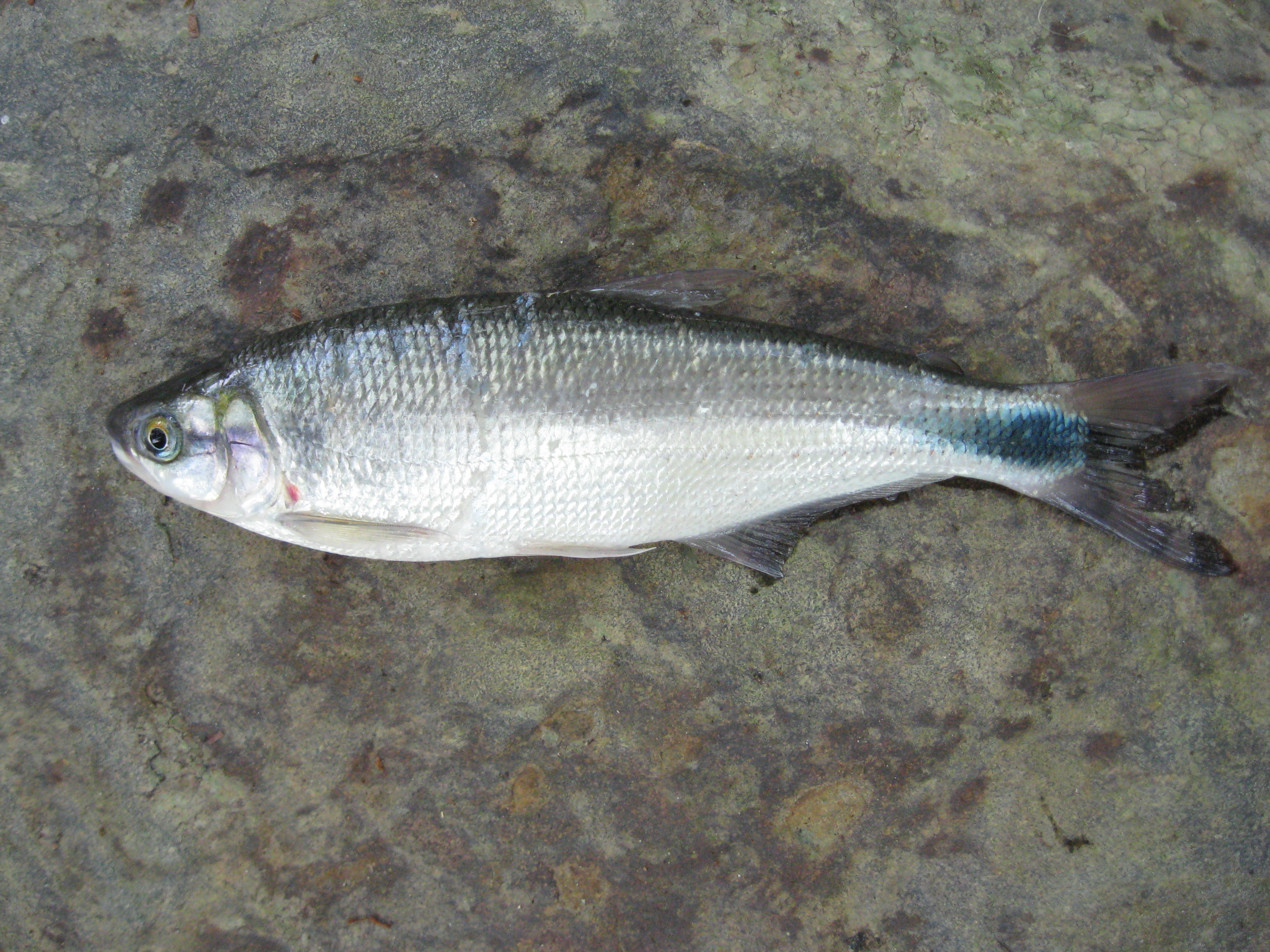
Brycon rubricauda

Brycon contains the following valid species:

- Brycon alburnus (Günther, 1860)
- Brycon amazonicus (Agassiz, 1829)
- Brycon argenteus Meek & Hildebrand, 1913
- Brycon atrocaudatus (Kner, 1863)
- Brycon behreae Hildebrand, 1938
- Brycon chagrensis (Kner, 1863)
- Brycon coquenani Steindachner, 1915
- Brycon costaricensis Angulo & Gracian-Negrete, 2013
- Brycon coxeyi Fowler, 1943
- Brycon dentex Günther, 1860
- Brycon devillei (Castelnau, 1855)
- Brycon dulcis Lima & Vieira, 2017
- Brycon falcatus J. P. Müller & Troschel, 1844
- Brycon ferox Steindachner, 1877
- Brycon fowleri Dahl, 1955
- Brycon gouldingi Lima, 2004
- Brycon guatemalensis Regan, 1908
- Brycon henni C. H. Eigenmann, 1913
- Brycon hilarii (Valenciennes, 1850)
- Brycon howesi Lima, 2017
- Brycon insignis Steindachner, 1877
- Brycon medemi Dahl, 1960
- Brycon meeki Eigenmann & Hildebrand, 1918
- Brycon melanopterus (Cope, 1872)
- Brycon moorei Steindachner, 1878
- Brycon nattereri Günther, 1864
- Brycon obscurus Hildebrand, 1938
- Brycon oligolepis Regan, 1913
- Brycon opalinus (Cuvier, 1819)
- Brycon orbignyanus (Valenciennes, 1850)
- Brycon orthotaenia Günther, 1864
- Brycon pesu J. P. Müller & Troschel, 1845
- Brycon petrosus Meek & Hildebrand, 1913
- Brycon polylepis Moscó Morales 1988
- Brycon posadae Fowler, 1945
- Brycon rubricauda Steindachner, 1879
- Brycon sinuensis Dahl, 1955
- Brycon stolzmanni Steindachner, 1879
- Brycon striatulus (Kner, 1863)
- Brycon unicolor Moscó Morales, 1988
- Brycon vermelha Lima & Castro, 2000
- Brycon vonoi Lima, 2017
- Brycon whitei Myers & Weitzman 1960

=== Cladogram ===
The following cladogram based on a 2014 maximum likelihood phylogenetic tree of Bryconidae. It recovers the consensus that Brycon is not monophyletic as the genus encompasses multiple lineages:

- ⊞Brycon + Chilobrycon
  ⊟
  - Brycon chagrensis
  - - Brycon petrosus
    - - Chilobrycon deuterodon
      - - Brycon aff. atrocaudatus
        - Brycon henni
- - Salminus
  - ⊞Brycon + Henochilus
    ⊟
    - Brycon pesu
    - - - Brycon moorei
        - - Brycon orthotaenia
          - Brycon orbygnianus
          - Brycon hilarii
          - Brycon gouldingi
          - Brycon amazonicus
      - - - Brycon falcatus (Type)
          - Brycon melanopterus
        - - Brycon opalinus
          - - Brycon nattereri
            - - - Henochilus wheatlandii
                - Brycon sp.
              - - Brycon vermelha
                - Brycon insignis
                - Brycon ferox
