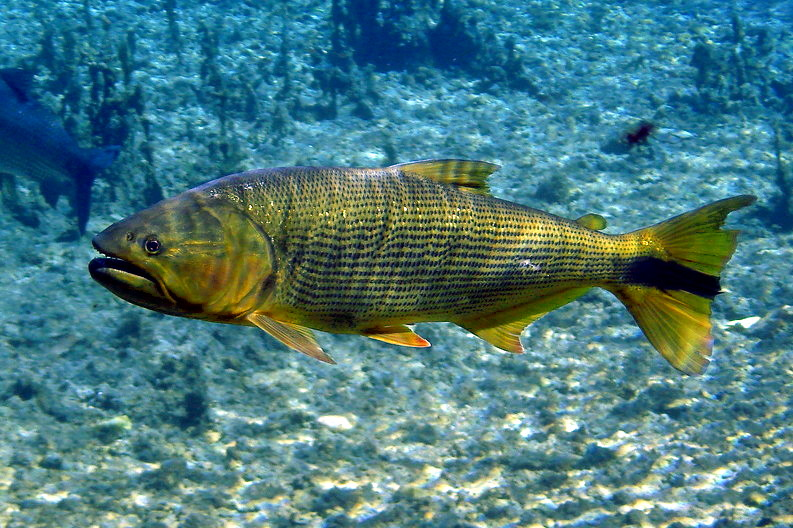

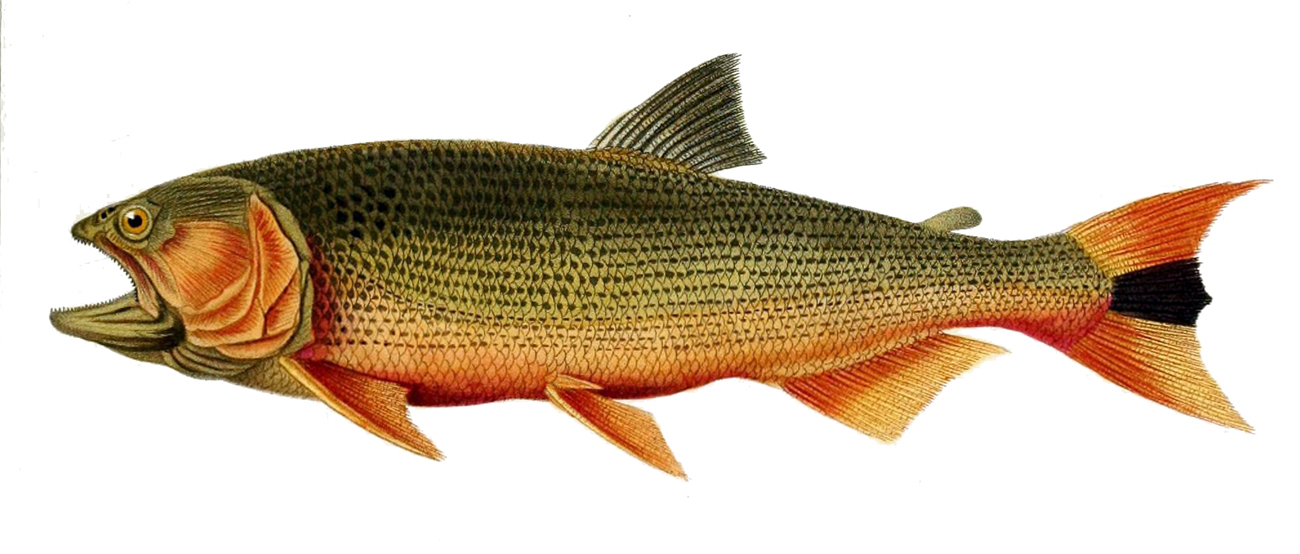

Conservation status
- Least Concern (IUCN 3.1)

Scientific classification
- Kingdom: Animalia
- Phylum: Chordata
- Class: Actinopterygii
- Division: Teleostei
- Order: Characiformes
- Family: Bryconidae
- Genus: Salminus
- Species: S. brasiliensis

Binomial name
- Salminus brasiliensis (Cuvier, 1816)

Synonyms
- List: Hydrocynus brasiliensis Cuvier, 1816; Hydrocyon brevidens Cuvier, 1819; Salminus cuvieri Valenciennes, 1850; Salminus maxillosus Valencienes, 1850; Salminus orbignyanus Valencienes, 1850; Salmo auratus Larrañaga, 1923

= Salminus brasiliensis =

Species of fish

Salminus brasiliensis, also known as the golden dorado, dorado, river tiger, dourado, or jaw characin, is a large, predatory characiform freshwater fish found in central and east-central South America. Despite having Salminus in its name, the dorado is not related to any species of salmon, nor to the saltwater fish also called "dorado". It is very popular among recreational anglers and supports large commercial fisheries.

== Etymology ==
Dorado, both in the name of the fish and other uses such as the El Dorado legend, originates from the Latin word for "gold", auratus (later modified into dauratus in Vulgar Latin, and subsequently oro in Italian and Spanish, and ouro in Portuguese).

The Portuguese word dourado and Spanish dorado both mean "golden"; this is applied to the fish due to its color displaying golden reflections.

== Description ==
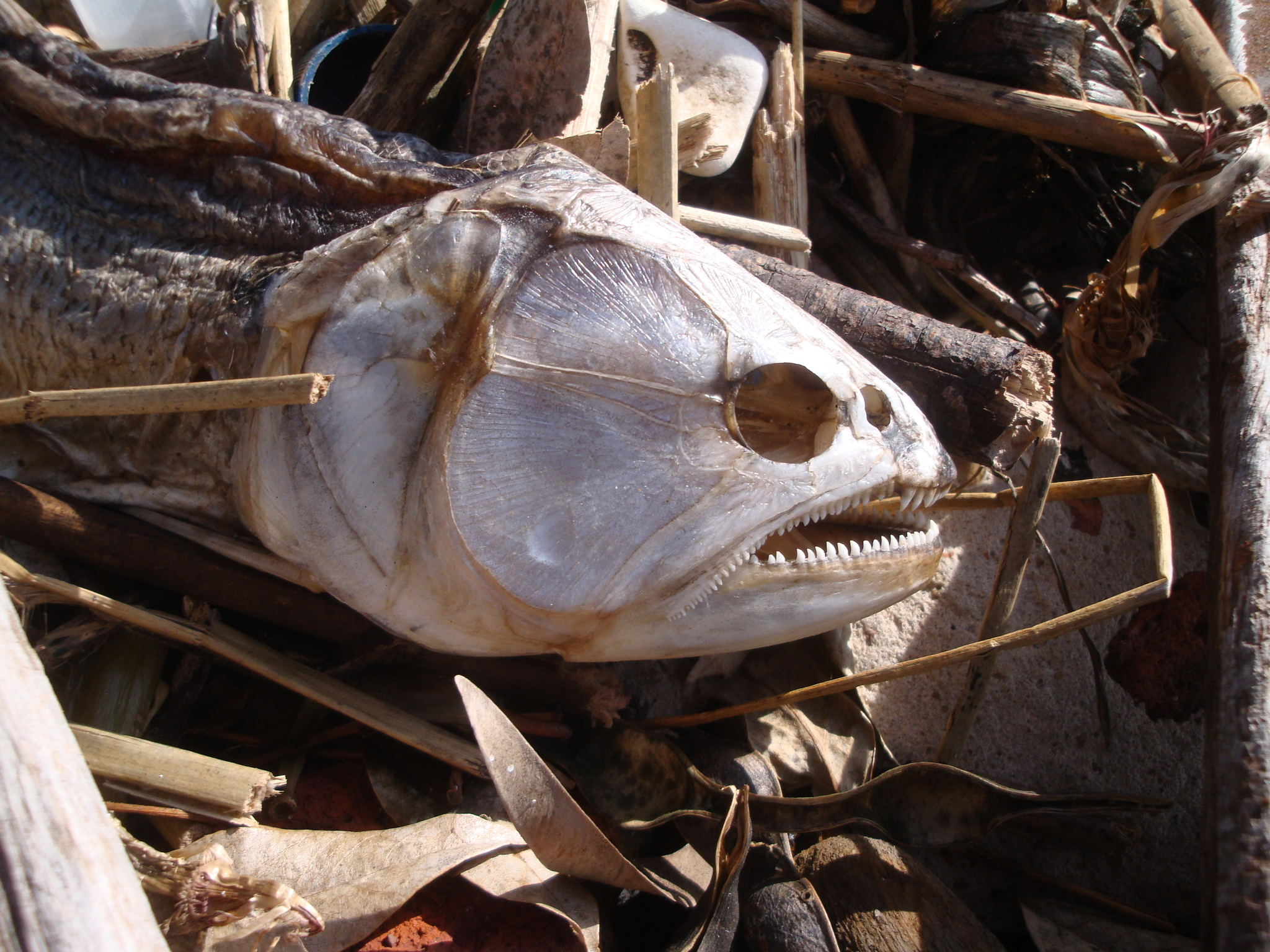
Skull, in Buenos Aires

The golden dorado has a large head, with powerful jaws filled with sharp teeth. Adults are yellow-golden in color, but juveniles are more silvery. Immatures (to a lesser extent adults) resemble Brycon hilarii and Salminus hilarii. It reaches maturity around 38 cm (15 in) long. The average size of the golden dorado is about 3–10 kg (6.6–22.0 lb). The largest recorded size is 1.3 m (51 in) in length and 34 kg (75 lb) in weight. Females grow considerably larger than males, but otherwise the sexes are similar. It is the largest scaled freshwater fish in the Río de la Plata Basin (the only fish that can surpass it in size are certain river stingrays and catfish, both scaleless).

== Distribution, habitat and life cycle ==
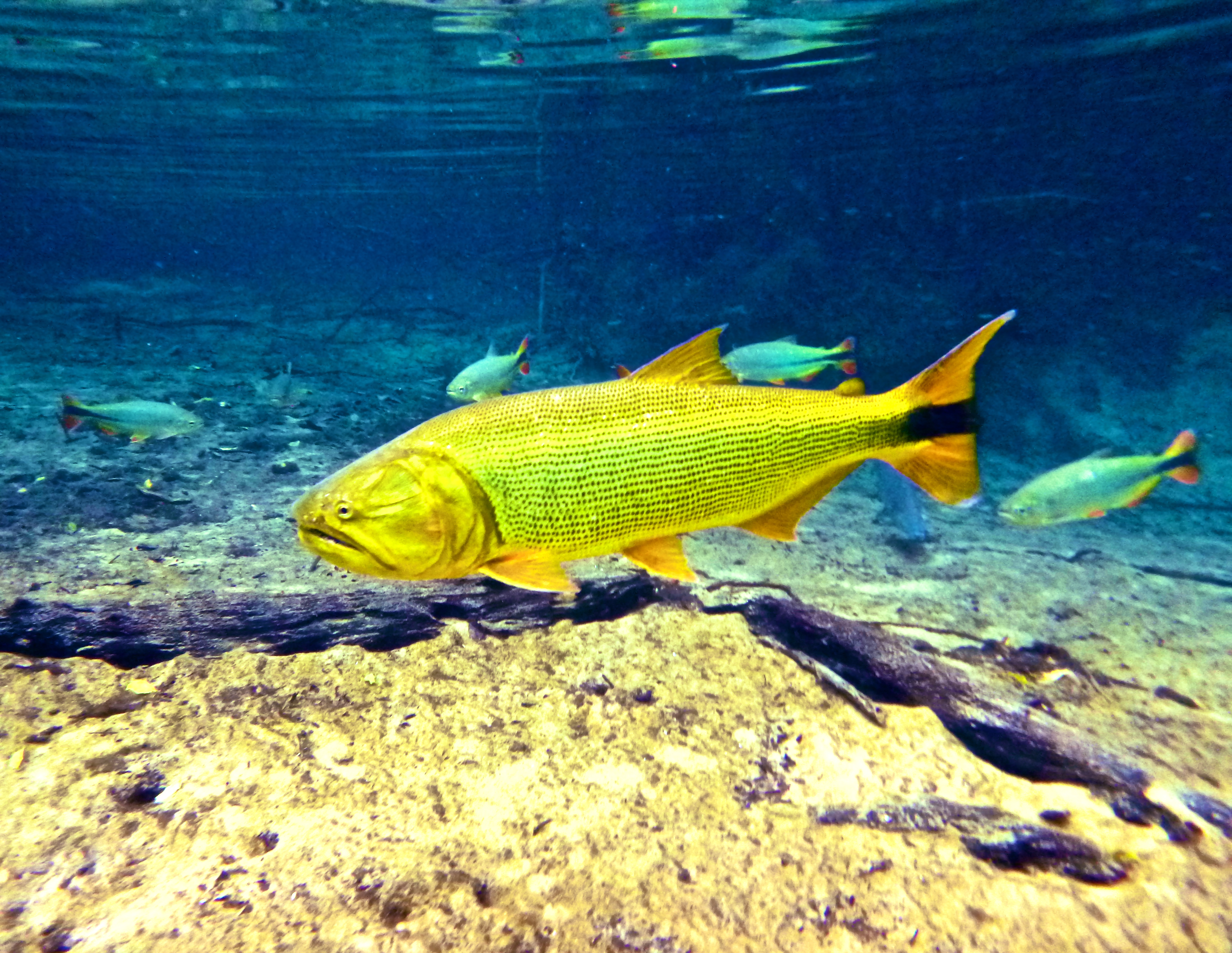
A golden dorado in Bonito, Pantanal, Brazil (four superficially similar Brycon hilarii in the background, a species mimicked by juvenile golden dorados)

The golden dorado is native to warm freshwater habitats in southern Brazil, Paraguay, Uruguay, Bolivia and northern Argentina. Here it inhabits the Paraguay (including the Pantanal), Paraná, Uruguay, Chapare, Mamoré and Guaporé River basins, and the drainage of the Lagoa dos Patos. Outside its native range, the golden dorado has been introduced to several southeast Brazilian river basins, notably Doce, Paraíba do Sul, Iguazu and Guaraguaçu.

Other South American river basins hold relatives of this species: S. franciscanus in the São Francisco Basin, S. hilarii in the upper Paraná, Amazon and Orinoco Basins, and S. affinis in the Santiago and Magdalena Basins in Ecuador and Colombia.

The golden dorado generally prefers water temperatures between 20 and 28 °C (68–82 °F). It is migratory in response to temperature, season, and food sources, and moves upstream, typically about 400 km (250 mi), to spawn in the spring and summer. It is generally a solitary species, but migrates in groups. The females reach maturity when 4–5 years old and can lay up to 2 million eggs, which are released near the water surface. Golden dorados can live more than 15 years.

== Diet ==
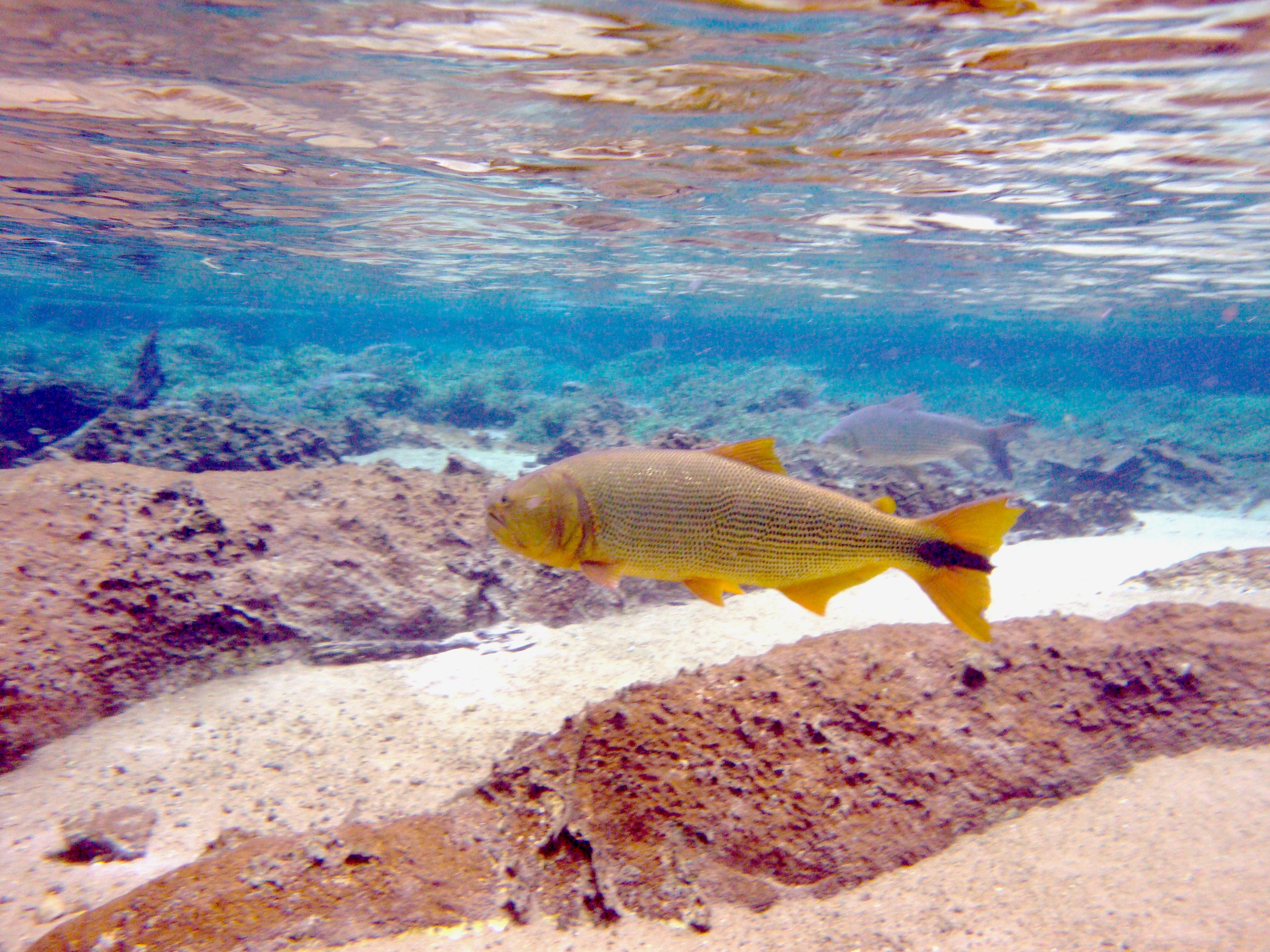
A golden dorado in Bonito, Pantanal, Brazil (a streaked prochilod, one of its favorite prey items, in the background)

Golden dorados are the apex predators in their freshwater habitat. They are primarily piscivores, eating a wide variety of fish, but have also been recorded feeding on large insects, crustaceans, and small vertebrates (for example, rodents, lizards, and birds). One of the adult dorado's favorite prey is the streaked prochilod (Prochilodus lineatus), a species of schooling fish that also is migratory.

In the larval stage, golden dorados feed on plankton. As they grow larger, they switch to insects and small fish. At up to 30 cm (12 in) long, juveniles are aggressive mimics of Brycon hilarii in both general shape and color, often staying near schools of this frugivorous species to be able to surprise smaller prey fish such as Astyanax and Moenkhausia tetras. In contrast, adult dorados have been known to eat Brycon hilarii.

== Status ==
The golden dorado has declined because of overfishing and dams, which restrict its breeding migration. It is listed as a threatened species in Rio Grande do Sul in Brazil and Paraguay; in the latter country, a five-year fishing ban was put into effect.

In contrast, the golden dorado has been introduced for fishing to several rivers outside its native range. Being a large, highly predatory species, this represents a serious threat to the native fish in these rivers.
