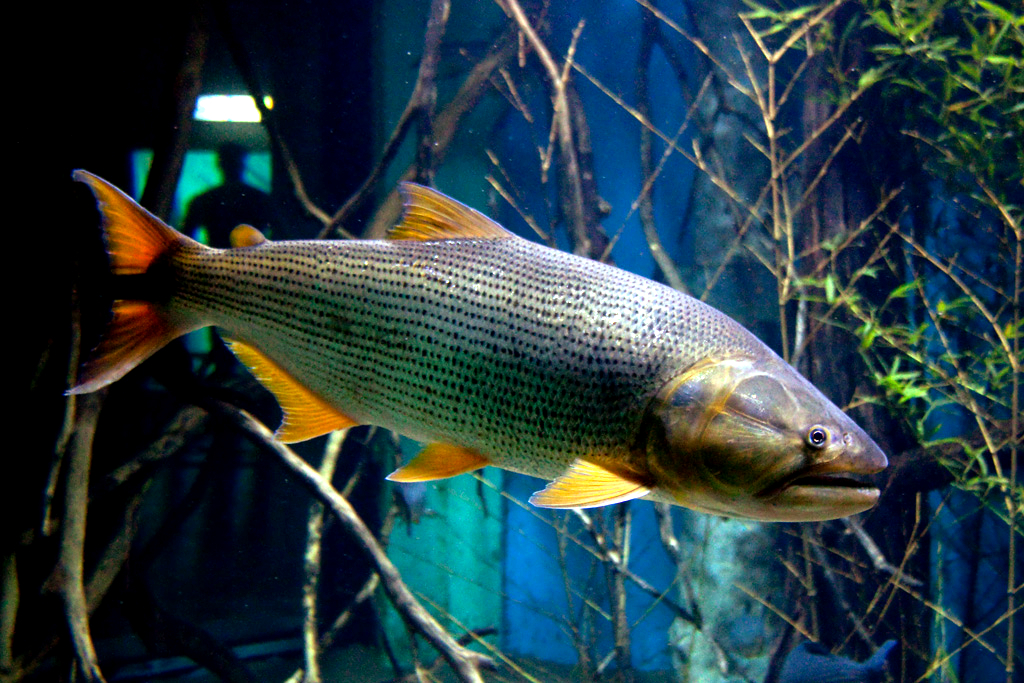

Conservation status
- Least Concern (IUCN 3.1)

Scientific classification
- Kingdom: Animalia
- Phylum: Chordata
- Class: Actinopterygii
- Order: Characiformes
- Family: Bryconidae
- Genus: Salminus
- Species: S. franciscanus

Binomial name
- Salminus franciscanus Lima & Britski, 2007

= Salminus franciscanus =

Species of fish

Salminus franciscanus, commonly called the São Francisco Dorado, is a species of freshwater ray-finned fish belonging to the family Bryconidae, the dorados and jaw characins. This fish is endemic to Brazil.

== Taxonomy ==
Salminus franciscanus was first formally described in 2007 by the Brazilian ichthyologists Flávio César Thadeo de Lima and Heraldo A. Britski, with its type locality given as a stream which is a tributary to the Rio das Velhas at Igreja Quebrada near Jaguara at 19°27'S, 43°57'W, Pedro Leopoldo in Minas Gerais. Although this species was described in 2007, it was known to exist at least as far back as the mid-19th century, as it is mentioned by Achille Valenciennes in volume 22 of Histoire naturelle des poissons by Cuvier and Valenciennes, published in 1850. This species is classified in the genus Salminus, the only genus in the subfamily Salmininae, which is one of two subfamilies in the family Bryconidae. The family Bryconidae is part of the suborder Characoidei in the order Characiformes.

== Etymology ==
Salminus franciscanus is classified in the genus Salminus, a name which suffixes -inus onto the Latin name for salmon, Salmo. This is an allusion to the salmon-like body shape and adipose fin of S. brevidens, the type species of the genus. The specific name, franciscanus, suffixes -anus, meaning "belonging to", onto the name of the São Francisco River drainage system, where this species is endemic.

== Description ==
Salminus franciscanus has a fusiform body with a maximum standard length of 93 cm (37 in) and a maximum published weight of 19.8 kg (44 lb).

This species may be told apart from its congeners by the possession of a second tooth on the dentary in the outer series which is clearly larger than the other teeth, whereas in S. affinis and S. hilarii. It further differs from S. affinis in lacking a dark stripe behind the eye. It can be separated from S. brasiliensis in having between 68 and 82 scales in the lateral line, as opposed to between 79 and 102; and in having between 11 and 14 scales horizontal scales between origin of the dorsal fin and the lateral line, compared to between 14 and 18. Another difference between these two species is that S. franciscanus has 6 to 8 horizontal scales between the lateral line and the pelvic fin, while S. brasiliensis has between 6 and 9. When compared to the sympatric S. hilarii, S. franciscanus typically has differing scale counts, and it also differs in having a golden hue, especially over the face and on the pectoral girdle, which is silvery in S. hilarii.

== Distribution ==
Salminus franciscanus is endemic to Brazil, where it is restricted to the drainage system of the São Francisco river in the states of Bahia and Minas Gerais.

== Utilisation ==
Salminus franciscanus is a popular sport fish with anglers, and is fished commercially.
