= Iguazu River =

River in Brazil and Argentina

Iguazú: Iguaçu; Iguazu; Iguassu
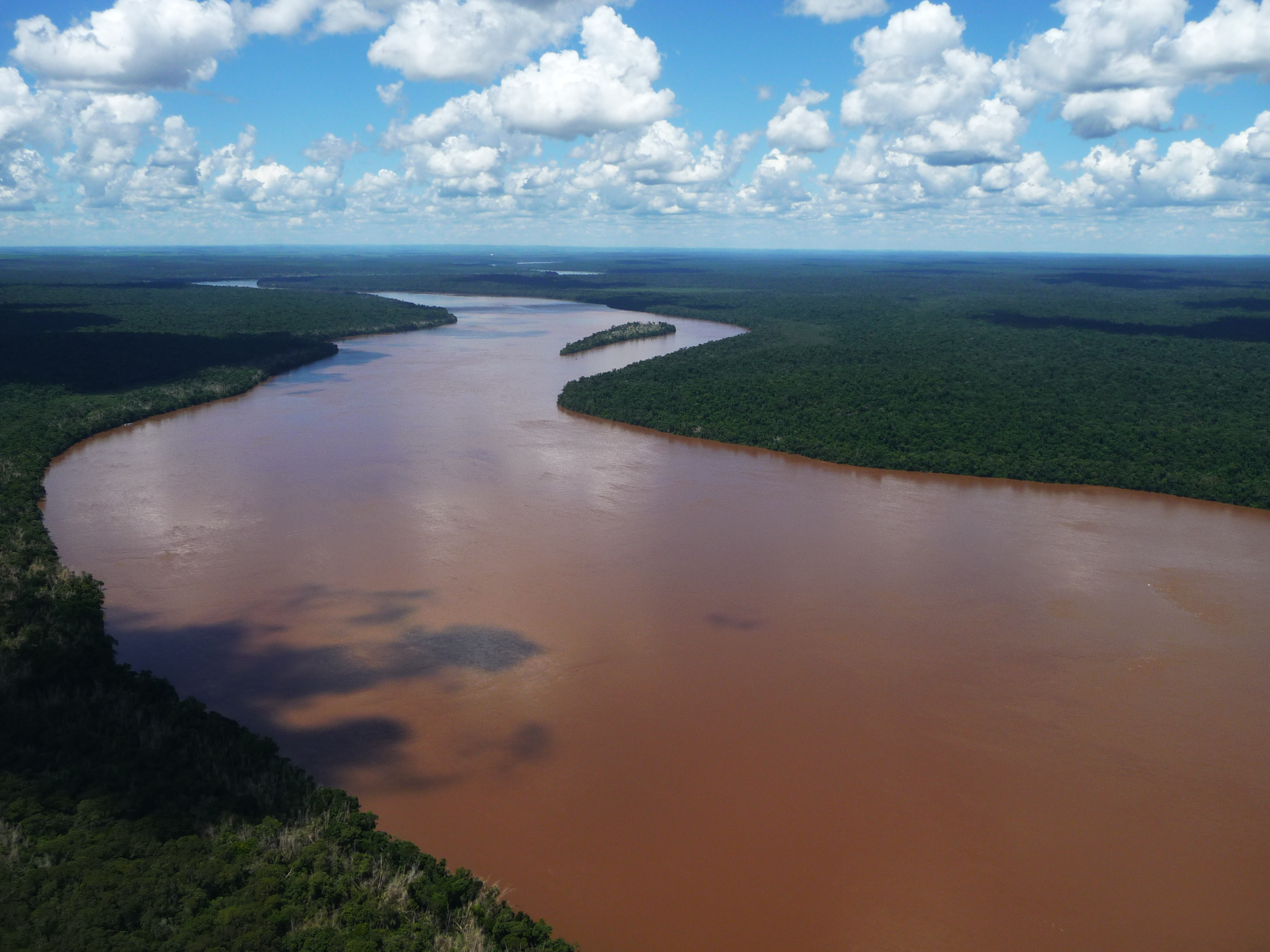
- The river directly above Iguazu Falls

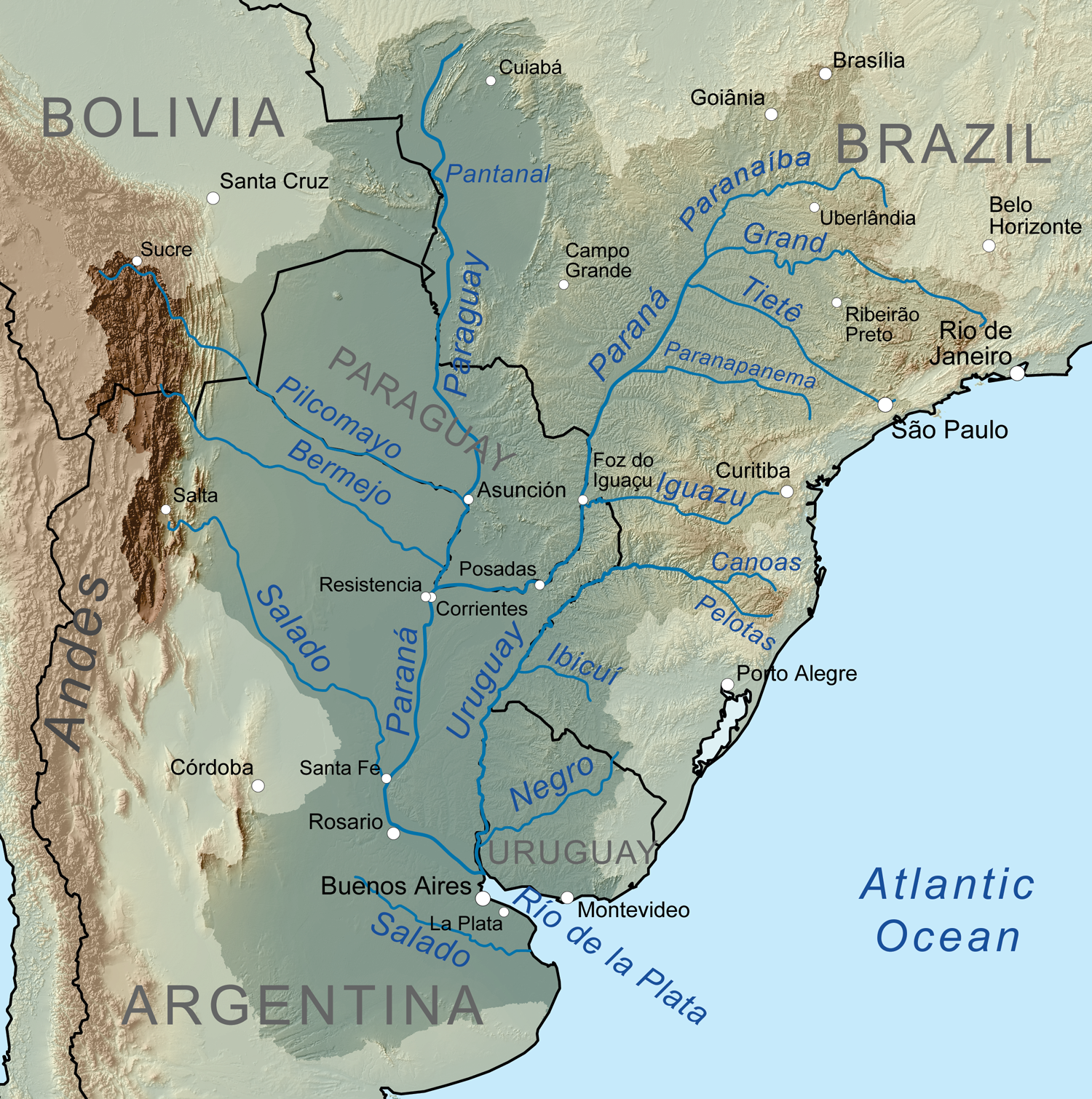
- Map of the Rio de la Plata Basin, showing the Iguazu River joining the Paraná River north of the upper Uruguay River
- Etymology: from Guarani y guasú 'big water'

Location
- Countries: Brazil and Argentina
- Cities: Curitiba; Campo Largo; Foz do Iguaçu

Physical characteristics
- Source: Serra do Mar
  - location: Near Curitiba, Paraná, Brazil
  - coordinates: 25°23′30″S 49°00′11″W
  - elevation: 1,200 m (3,900 ft)
- Mouth: Paraná River
  - location: Foz do Iguaçu, Misiones Province and Paraná, border between Argentina and Brazil
  - coordinates: 25°35′33″S 54°35′30″W
  - elevation: 110 m (360 ft)
- Length: 1,320 km (820 mi)
- Basin size: 62,000 km^{2} (24,000 mi^{2}) 67,537.3 km^{2} (26,076.3 mi^{2})
- Discharge
  - location: Foz do Iguaçu (near mouth)
  - average: (Period: 1971–2000)1,835.9 m^{3}/s (64,830 cu ft/s)
- Discharge
  - location: Iguazu Falls
  - average: 1,746 m^{3}/s (61,700 cu ft/s)
  - minimum: 200 m^{3}/s (7,100 cu ft/s)
  - maximum: 12,799 m^{3}/s (452,000 cu ft/s)

Basin features
- Progression: Paraná → Río de la Plata → Atlantic Ocean
- River system: Río de la Plata
- Tributaries
  - left: Rio Negro (Iguazu), Rio Xopim
  - right: Rio de Areia

The Iguazu River or Rio Iguassu (/ɪɡwɑːˈsuː/; Portuguese: Rio Iguaçu [ˈʁi.u iɡwaˈsu]; Spanish: Río Iguazú [ˈri.o iɣwaˈsu]; from Guarani y guasú 'big water'), is a river in Brazil and Argentina. It is an important tributary of the Paraná River. The Iguazu River is 1,320 kilometres (820 mi) long, with a drainage basin of 62,000 km^{2} (24,000 mi^{2}).

== Course ==
The Iguazu originates in the Serra do Mar coastal mountains of the Brazilian state of Paraná and close to Curitiba. For 1,205 kilometres (749 mi), to its confluence with the San Antonio River, the Iguazu flows west through Paraná State, Brazil. Downriver from the confluence, the Iguazu River forms the boundary between Brazil and Argentina's Misiones Province. Continuing west, the river drops off a plateau, forming Iguazu Falls. The falls are within national parks in both Brazil, Iguaçu National Park, and Argentina, Iguazú National Park. It empties into the Paraná River at the point where the borders of Argentina, Brazil, and Paraguay join, an area known as the Triple Frontier.

== Ecology ==
Unlike tropical South American rivers, where the annual variations in temperature are relatively limited, the water in the subtropical Iguazu River varies significantly depending on season. At two sites, one located just above and another just below the falls, the water at both varied from about 15.5 to 29 °C (60–84 °F), and average was just below 22 °C (72 °F). The pH is typically near-neutral, ranging from 5.9 to 8.7.

About 100 fish species are native to the Iguazu River, and several undescribed species are known. Most fish species in the river are catfish, characiforms and cichlids. About 70% are endemic, which to a large extent is linked to the falls, serving both as a home for rheophilic species and isolating species above and below. This also means that, except for the threatened Steindachneridion melanodermatum in the lower part, large migratory fish known from much of the Paraná River Basin are naturally absent from Iguazu. Almost 30 introduced species are found in the river where about one-third originate from other continents (such as carp, largemouth bass, tilapia and African sharptooth catfish) and the remaining from elsewhere in South America (such as dorado, Cichla kelberi, Piaractus mesopotamicus, Brycon hilarii, Prochilodus lineatus and Odontesthes bonariensis).

The unusual Aegla crustaceans are locally common in the Iguazu River Basin.

== Environmental issues ==
In July 2000 more than 4,000,000 litres (1,100,000 US gal) of crude oil spilled into the river from a state-run oil refinery in the municipality of Araucária near Curitiba.

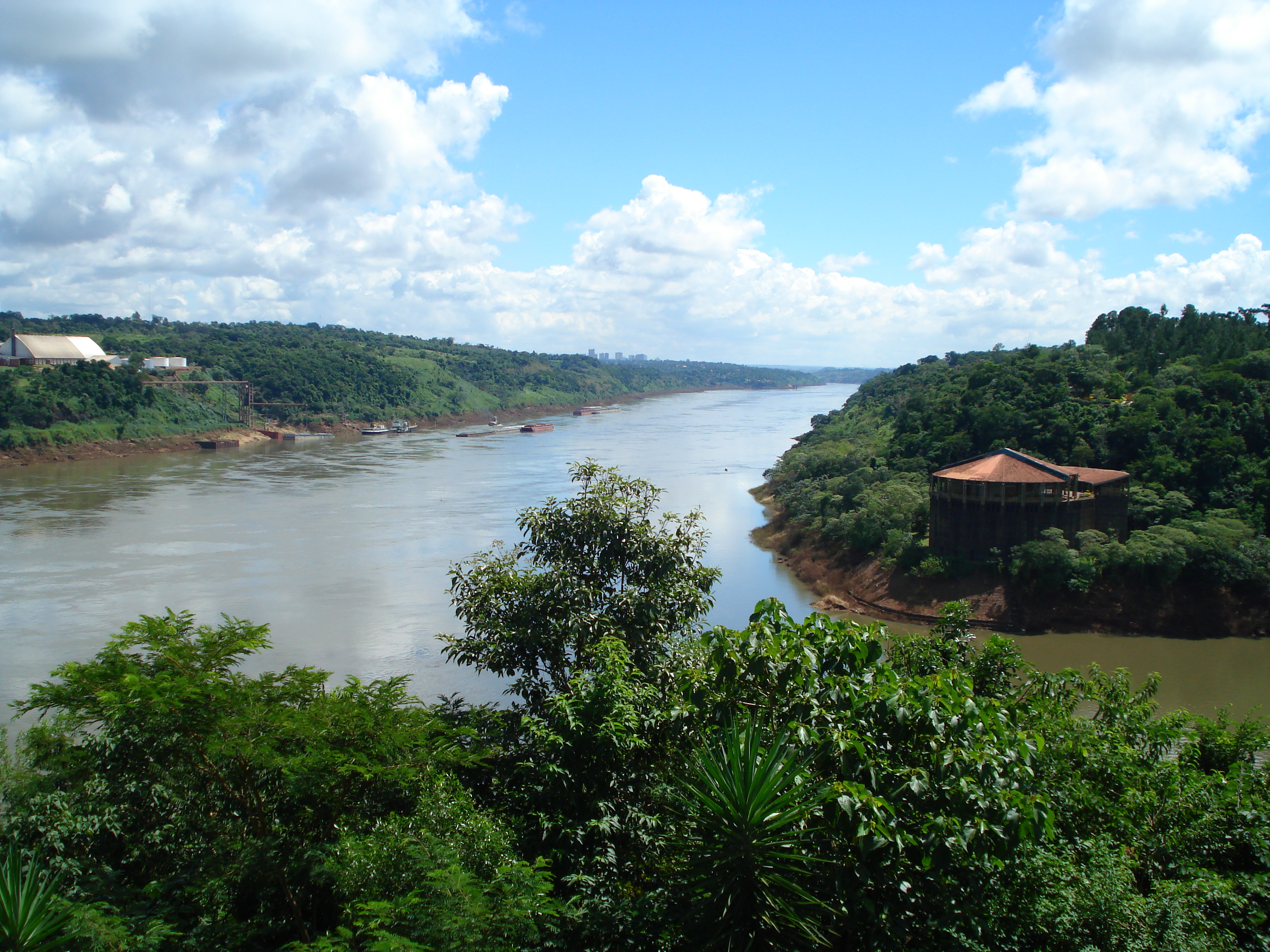
The Iguazu (right) at its confluence with the Paraná (middle)

== See also ==
- List of rivers of Argentina
- List of rivers of Brazil
- Puerto Iguazú
- Foz do Iguaçu
