= Argentina–Brazil border =

International border

Coordinates: 25°35′S 54°35′W

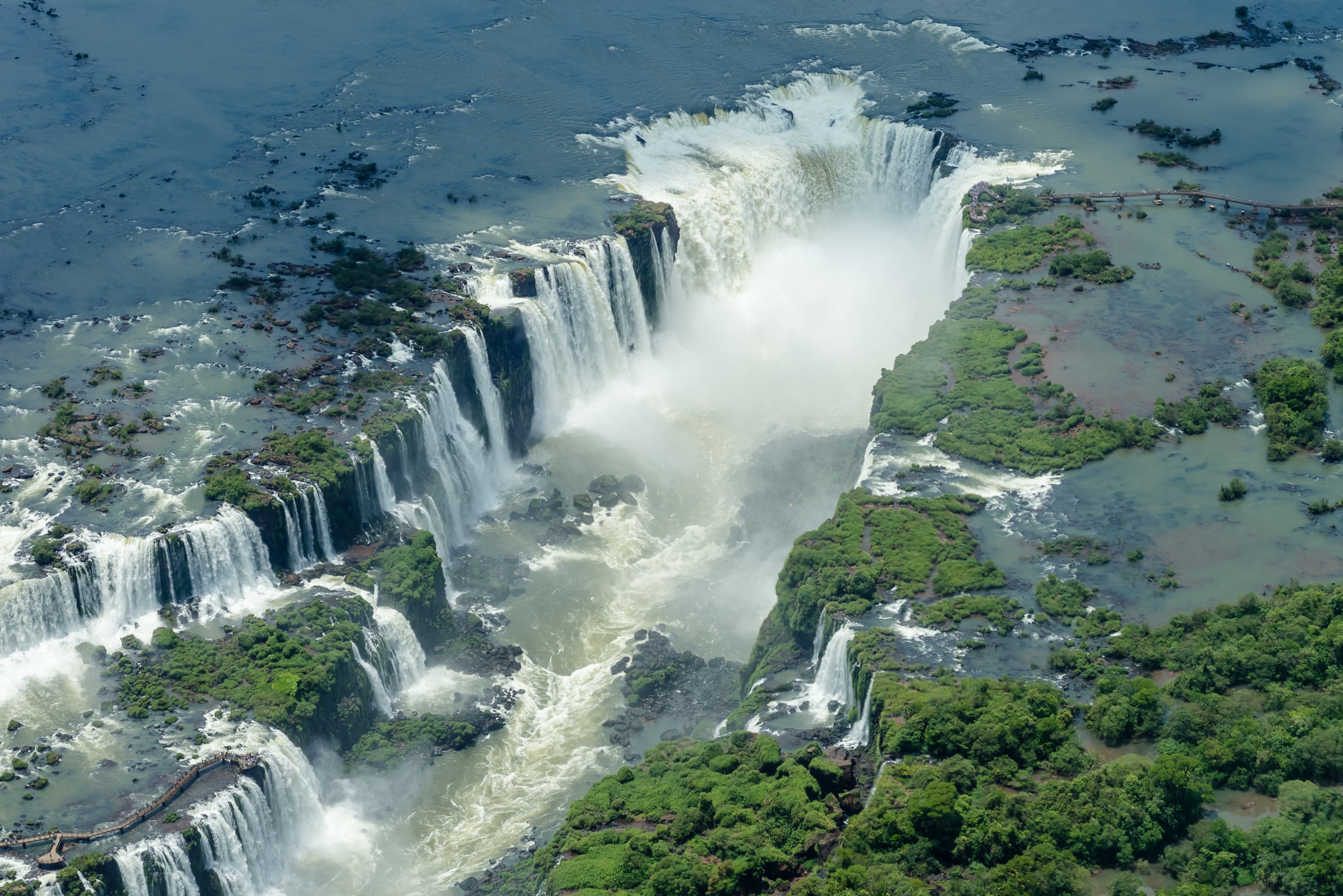
The Iguaçu Falls lie on the border between Argentina and Brazil.

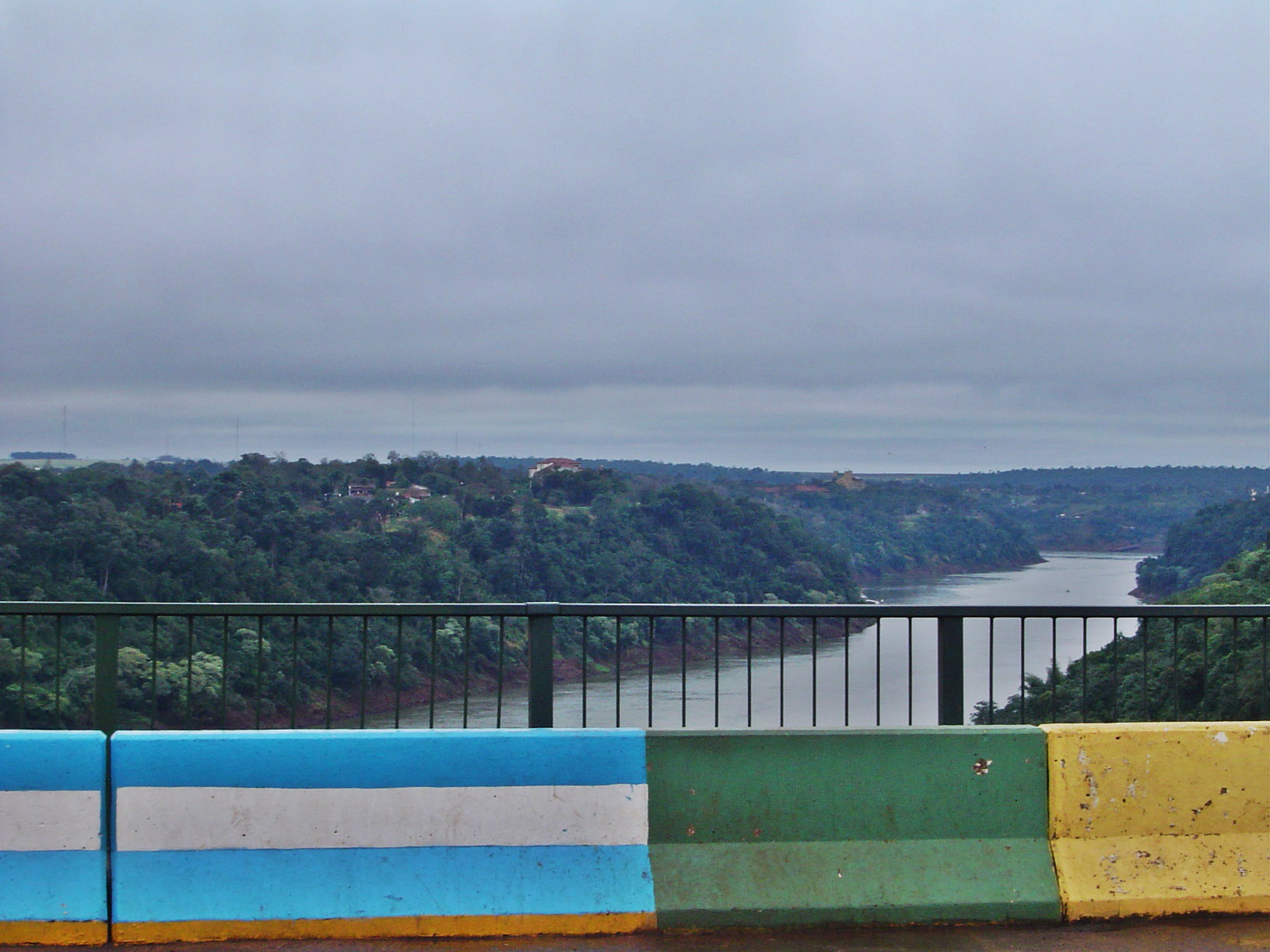
A bridge on the Iguaçu River, between Puerto Iguazú, Argentina and Foz do Iguaçu, Brazil.

The Argentina–Brazil border is the line that limits the territories of the Argentine Republic and the Federative Republic of Brazil. It is approximately 1,224 km (761 mi) long.

Starting at the confluence of Paraná and Iguaçu rivers, it passes through the Iguaçu Falls and follows the thalweg of that river to the mouth of Santo Antônio River, then running upstream the course of this river until its source. From there the boundary runs 25.1 km (15.6 mi) by land until reaching the source of the Peperi-Guaçu River and from there along the channel of that river to its confluence with the Uruguay River, then running downstream the course of the Uruguay to the mouth of river Quaraí.

It was defined by the Treaty of 1898 (which is based on an Arbitration Award 1895), referred by President of the United States Grover Cleveland, and is perfectly demarcated. The characterization work is in charge of the so-called "Joint Commission for Inspecting the Mark of the Brazil-Argentina border" (created in 1970), which has deployed 310 boundary markers.

Its total length is 1,224 km (761 mi) by rivers and only 24 km (15 mi) by land.
