= Paraguay River =

River of Argentina, Brazil and Paraguay

Paraguay River Rio Paraguai, Río Paraguay
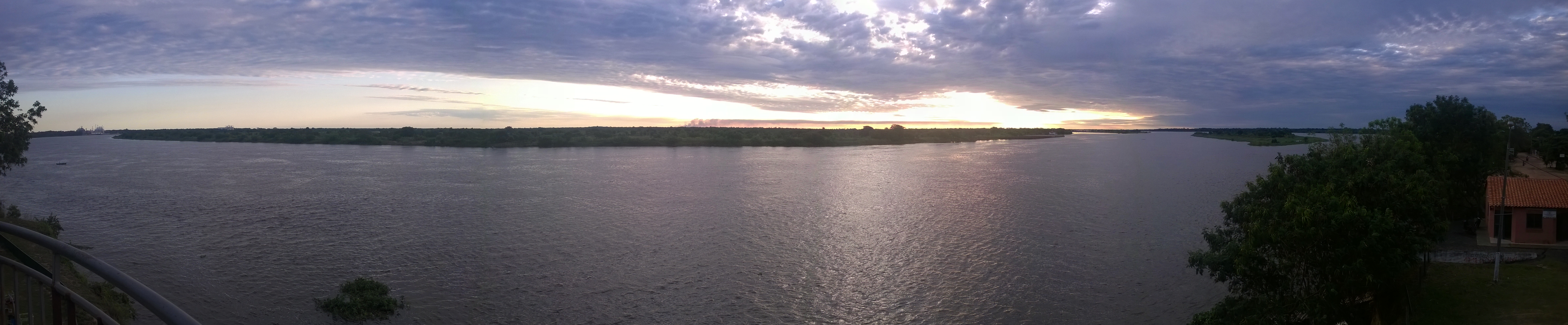
- View of Paraguay River near Antequera, Paraguay

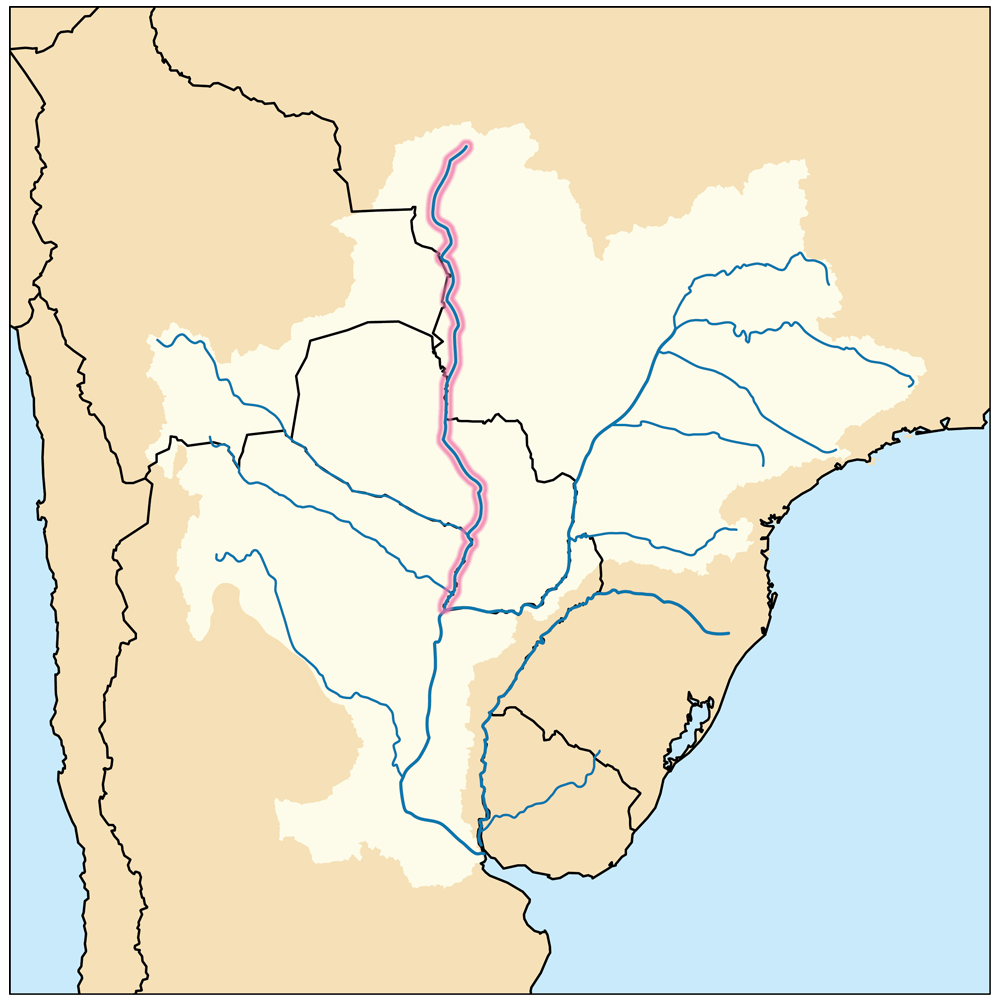
- Map of the Paraná River Basin, showing the Paraguay River in highlight.

Location
- Countries: Paraguay; Brazil; Argentina; Bolivia

Physical characteristics
- Source: Parecis Plateau
  - location: Alto Paraguai, Brazil
  - coordinates: 14°37′37″S 56°30′07″W
  - elevation: 434 m (1,424 ft)
- Mouth: Paraná River
  - location: Argentina, Paraguay
  - coordinates: 27°18′S 58°38′W
  - elevation: 50 m (160 ft)
- Length: 2,621 km (1,629 mi)
- Basin size: 1,120,154 km^{2} (432,494 mi^{2}) 1,095,000 km^{2} (423,000 mi^{2})
- Discharge
  - location: Confluence of Parana
  - average: 5,493.005 m^{3}/s (193,983.6 cu ft/s) 4,550 m^{3}/s (161,000 cu ft/s) 189 km^{3}/a (6,000 m^{3}/s)
- Discharge
  - location: Puerto Bermejo
  - average: (Period of data: 1971–2010)4,696 m^{3}/s (165,800 cu ft/s)

Basin features
- Progression: Paraná River → Río de la Plata → Atlantic Ocean
- Tributaries
  - left: Cuiabá River, Rio Negro, Miranda River, Apa River, Tebicuary River
  - right: Jauru River, Rio Negro (Bolivia-Paraguay), Pilcomayo River, Bermejo River

The Paraguay River (Ysyry Paraguái in Guarani, Rio Paraguai in Portuguese, Río Paraguay in Spanish) is a major river in south-central South America, running through Brazil and Paraguay and forming parts of the Paraguay-Argentina, Brazil-Bolivia, and Brazil-Paraguay borders. It flows about 2,621 kilometres (1,629 mi) from its headwaters in the Brazilian state of Mato Grosso to its confluence with the Paraná River north of Corrientes and Resistencia.

== Course ==
The Paraguay's source is south of Diamantino in the Mato Grosso state of Brazil. It follows a generally southwesterly course, passing through the Brazilian city of Cáceres. It then turns in a generally southward direction, flowing through the Pantanal wetlands, the city of Corumbá, then running close to the Brazil-Bolivia border for a short distance in the Brazilian states of Mato Grosso and Mato Grosso do Sul.

From the city of Puerto Bahia Negra, Paraguay, the river forms the border between Paraguay and Brazil, flowing almost due south before the confluence with the Apa River.

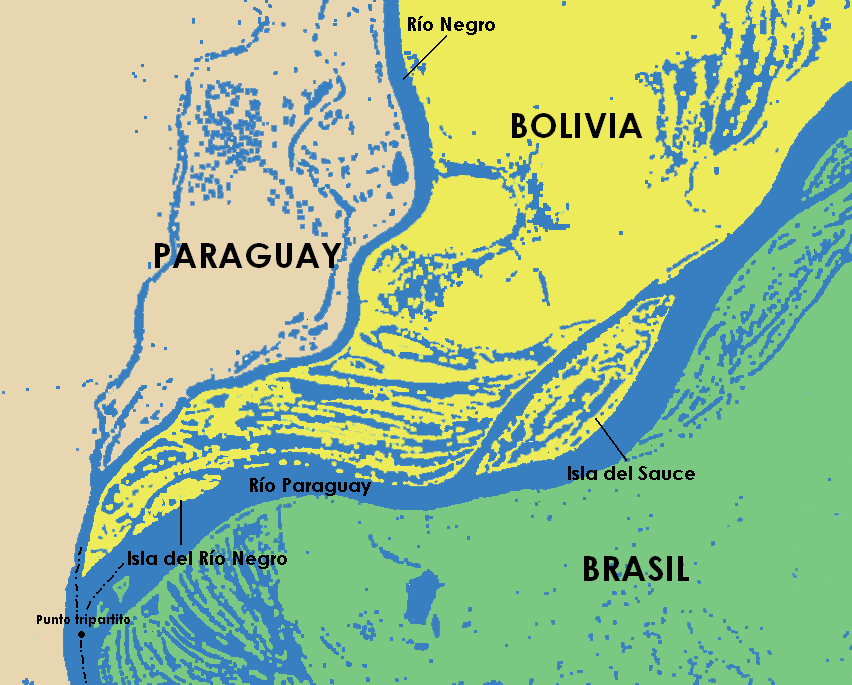
The Paraguay-Bolivia-Brazil tripoint map.

The Paraguay makes a long, gentle curve to the south-southeast before resuming a more south-southwesterly course, dividing the country of Paraguay into two distinct halves: the Gran Chaco region to the west, a largely uninhabited semi-arid region; and the eastern forested departments of the country, accounting for some 98% of the country's inhabitants. As such the river is considered perhaps the key geographical feature of the country with which it shares its name.

Some 400 kilometres (250 mi) after flowing through the middle of Paraguay, at the confluence with the Pilcomayo River and passing the Paraguayan capital city, Asunción, the river forms the border with Argentina, flowing generally south-southwesterly for another 275 kilometres (171 mi) before it reaches its end, joining with the Paraná River.

== Uses ==
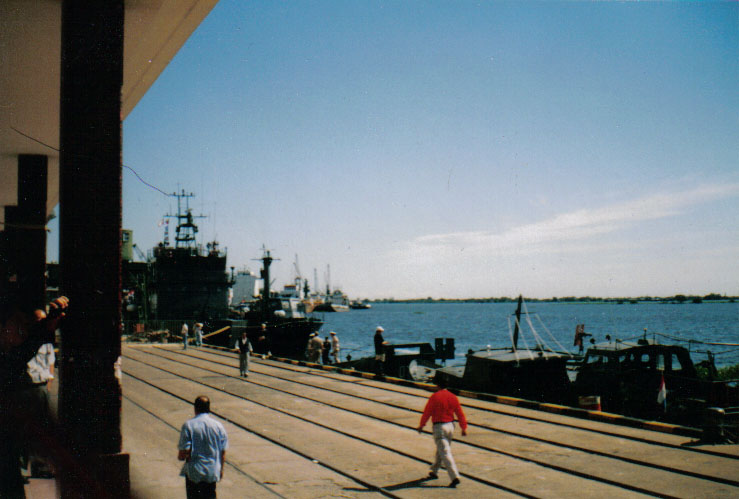
Deep water port on the River Paraguay in Asunción, Paraguay

The Paraguay River is the second major river of the Rio de la Plata Basin, after the Paraná River. The Paraguay's drainage basin, about 1,095,000 square kilometres (423,000 sq mi), covers a vast area that includes major portions of Argentina, southern Brazil, parts of Bolivia, and most of the country of Paraguay. Unlike many of the other great rivers of the Rio de la Plata Basin, the Paraguay has not been dammed for hydroelectric power generation; for this reason it is navigable for a considerable distance, second only to the Amazon River in terms of navigable length on the continent. This makes it an important shipping and trade corridor, providing a much-needed link to the Atlantic Ocean for the otherwise landlocked nations of Paraguay and Bolivia. It serves such important cities as Asunción and Concepción in Paraguay and Formosa in Argentina.

The river is also a source of commerce in the form of fishing, and provides irrigation for agriculture along its route. As such it provides a way of life for a number of poor fishermen who live along its banks and make the majority of their income selling fish in local markets, as well as supplying a major source of sustenance for their families. This has created issues in large cities such as Asunción, where poverty-stricken farmers from the country's interior have populated the river's banks in search of an easier lifestyle. Seasonal flooding of the river's banks sometimes forces many thousands of displaced residents to seek temporary shelter until the waters recede from their homes. The Paraguayan military has been forced to dedicate land on one of its reserves in the capital to emergency housing for these displaced citizens. The river is a tourist attraction for its beauty.

== History ==
The original inhabitants of the upper Paraguay River were the Guarani peoples.

The Paraguay River was explored in the 16th century by Sebastian Cabot, who at that time became the first recorded European to discover both the Paraná and Paraguay rivers. For hundreds of years, this river has served as the main route of Paraguay to the outside world.

Since that time, the river has had its vitality and importance, but is used today for a convoy of barges.

== Wetland controversy ==
The Paraguay River is the primary waterway of the 147,629-square-kilometre (57,000 sq mi) Pantanal wetlands of southern Brazil, northern Paraguay and parts of Bolivia. The Pantanal is the world's largest tropical wetland and is largely dependent upon waters provided by the Paraguay River.

Owing to its importance as a navigable waterway serving Brazil, Argentina, and Paraguay, the river has been the focus of commercial and industrial development. In 1997, the governments of the nations of the La Plata Basin proposed a plan under the Hidrovia Inter-Governmental Commission agency to develop the rivers into an industrial waterway system to help reduce the costs of exporting goods from the area, in particular the soybean crop that the area has embraced. The plan entailed constructing more hydroelectric dams along some of the waterways, along with a massive effort to restructure the navigable waterways—most notably the Paraguay River—through dredging of the waterway, rock removal and channel restructuring.

Studies indicated that the proposed river engineering of the Paraguay would have a devastating impact on the Pantanal wetlands. An effort by the Rios Vivos coalition to educate people on the effects of the project was successful in delaying the project, and the nations involved agreed to reformulate their plan. The final plan is still uncertain, along with the effect it will have on the Pantanal and the ecology of the entire Río de la Plata basin. The controversy over whether or not the project will have a disastrous effect on the local ecology, as well as the potential economic gains, continues to this day.

== Water characteristics ==
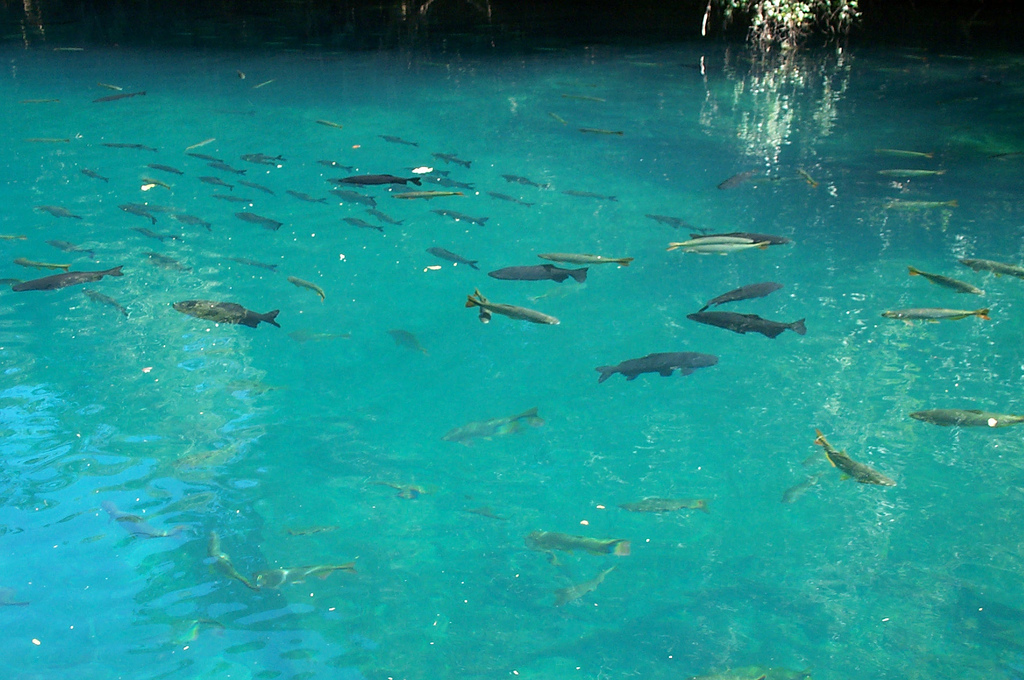
The very clear waters of the Rio da Prata, part of the Paraguay River basin near Bonito, Brazil, is rich in fish, such as Brycon hilarii (yellowish), Prochilodus lineatus (gray), and Piaractus sp. (dark)

The Paraguay River basin includes several distinctive habitats, ranging from very clear waters such as Rio da Prata (pt) near Bonito in the upper part to the sediment-rich Bermejo River in the lower part. The suspended load of the Paraguay River is about 100 milligrams per litre (3.6×10^{−6} lb/cu in) before the inflow of Bermejo, but rises to about 600 milligrams per litre (2.2×10^{−5} lb/cu in) after. Directly after the inflow of Bermejo River, the pH of the Paraguay River may reach up to 8.2. The typical pH of the Paraguay River is 5.8—7.4 in the upper part (defined as the section before the inflow of the first non-Pantanal tributary, the Apa River) and 6.3—7.9 in the lower part.

The peak of the flood season in the Paraguay River (measured at Corumbá) is delayed 4–6 months compared to the peak of the rainy season due to the slow passage of water through the Pantanal wetlands. There are significant temperature variations depending on the season. During the low-water season, the water of the Paraguay River is relatively warm (typically above 27 °C or 81 °F) and clouded (Secchi depth typically less than 32 cm or 13 in), but in the flood season it is colder (typically 18–26.3 °C or 64.4–79.3 °F) and clearer (Secchi depth typically 26–130 cm or 10–51 in). The upper part of the Paraguay River is warmer than the lower and generally its temperature does not fall below 22.5 °C (72.5 °F), although some upper Paraguay tributaries may fall below this.

== Fauna ==
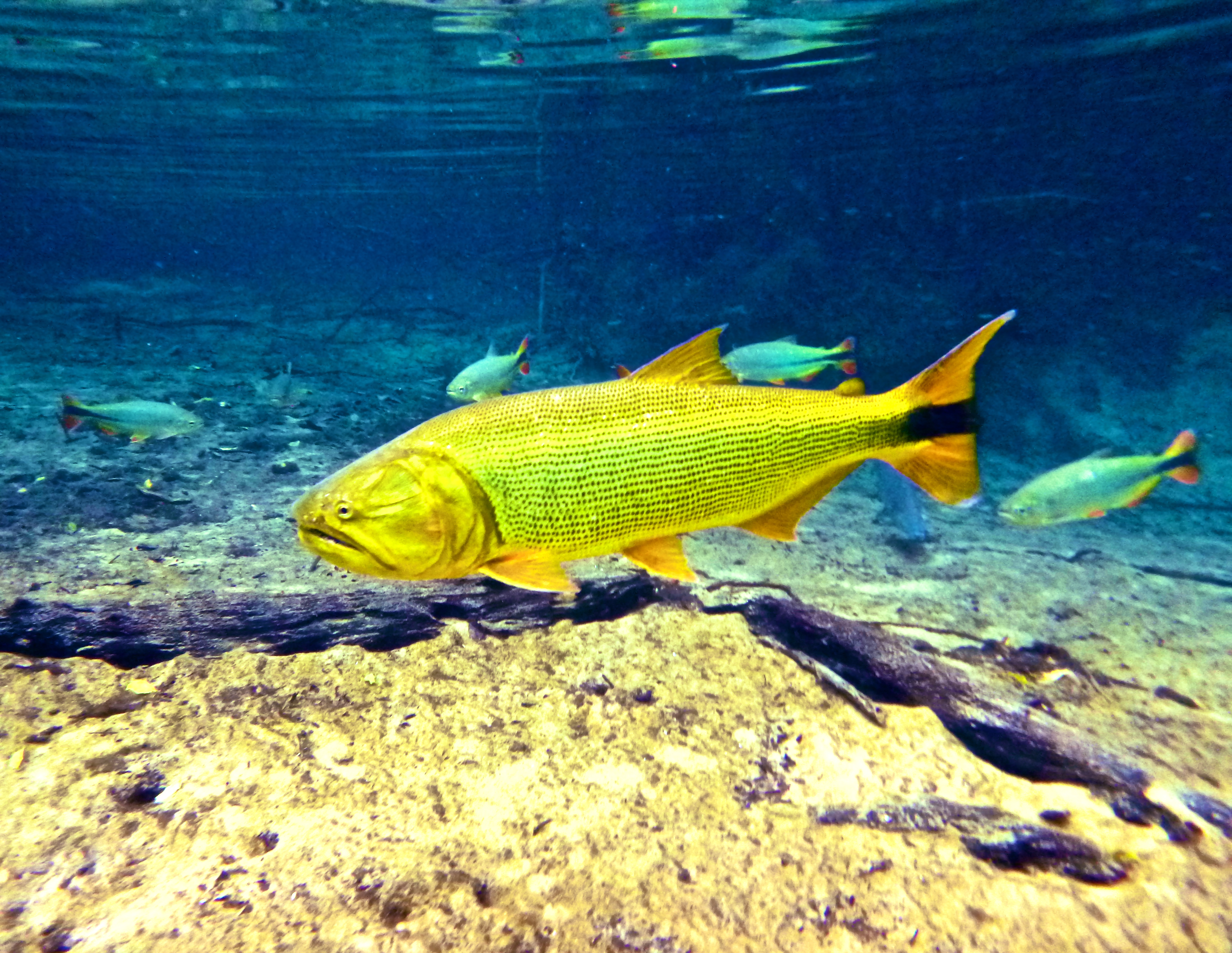
Two large characins of the Paraguay River; golden dorado (foreground) and four Brycon hilarii (background); near Bonito, Brazil

The Paraguay River ecoregion has high species richness with about 350 fish species, including more than 80 endemics. About 80% of the fish species in the river are characiforms (tetras and allies) and siluriforms (catfish). Several of these migrate up the Paraguay River to spawn, including Prochilodus lineatus and Pseudoplatystoma corruscans. Many species in the river are essentially of Paraná River Basin origin, but the fauna also has a connection with two Amazonian rivers, the Guaporé and Mamoré; while flowing in different directions, the Paraguay, Guaporé, and Mamoré all have their source in the same region in central South America. Among the species shared between these are the black phantom tetra, an important fish in the aquarium industry, and the golden dorado, which is important as game and as food.

== Gallery ==
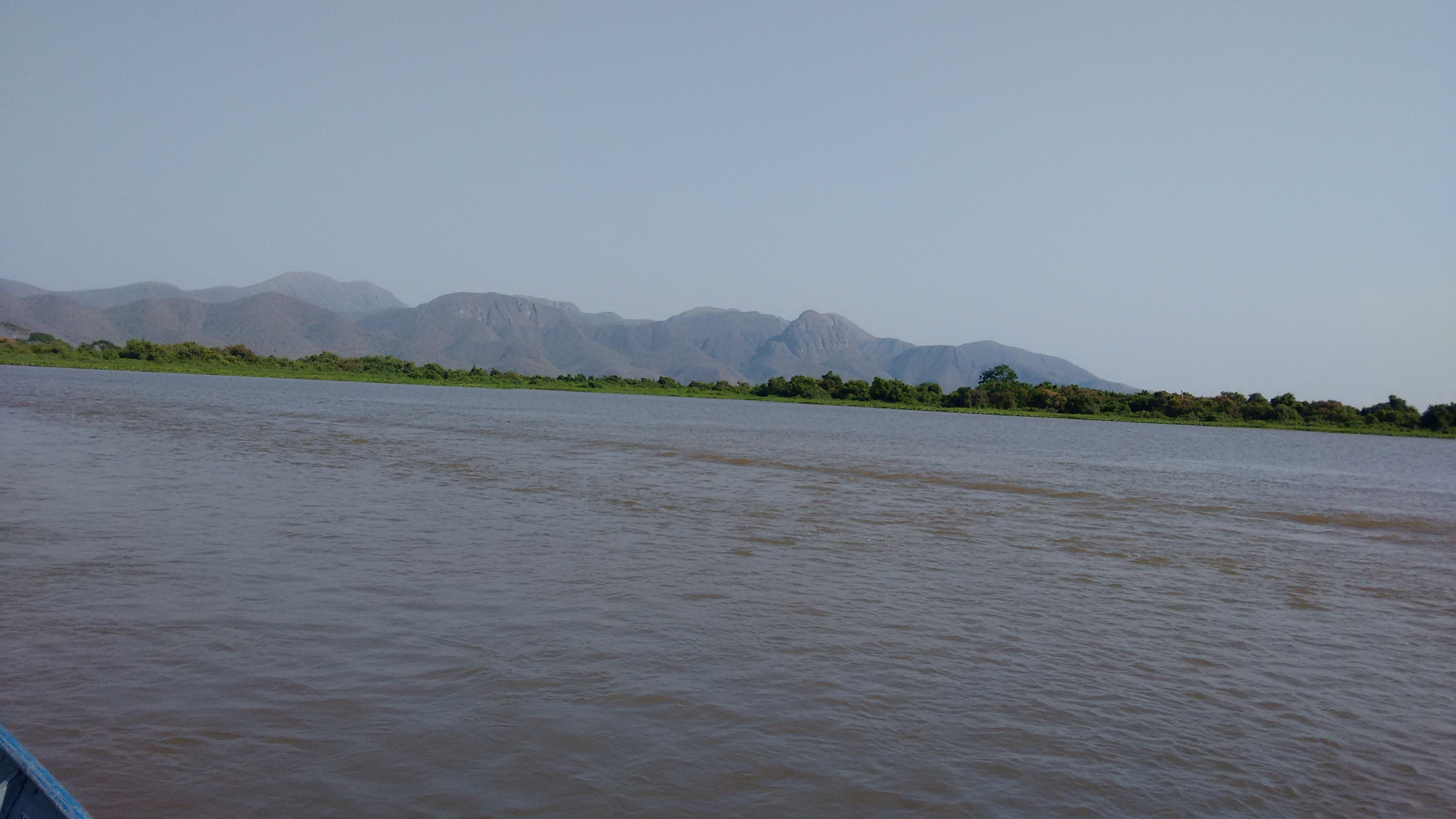
Paraguay River in the Amolar Mountains, in Corumbá, Mato Grosso do Sul, Brazil

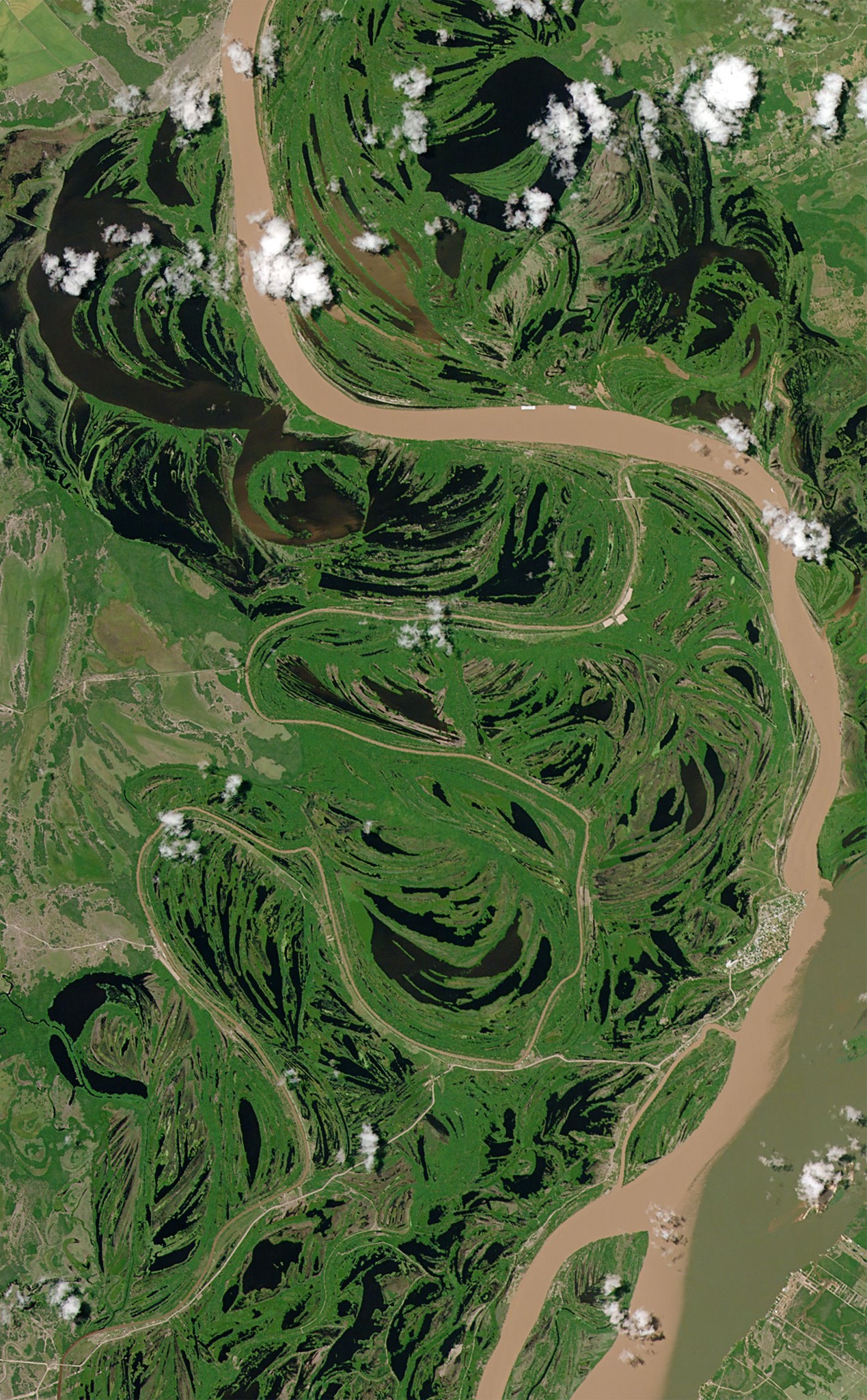
The Paraguay River around Isla del Cerrito, Argentina-Paraguay border. The Paraguay River passes through 2 Argentine provinces: Formosa and Chaco.

Puerto Busch, located directly along the Paraguay River, in the progressive region of Southeastern Bolivia, is Bolivia's only sovereign exit to the ocean.

== See also ==
- Paraguayan jaguar
- Tributaries of the Río de la Plata
- Gran Chaco people

== Bibliography ==
- American University Trade and Environment data base (2004). Itaipu Dam.
- American University Trade and Environment data base. (1999). Hydrovia Canal Plan and Environment. Available online at http://www.american.edu/TED/hidrovia.htm.
- Bascheck, B. and Hegglin, M. (2004). Plata/Paraná River Basin, A Case Study. Swiss Federal Institute for Environmental Science and Technology.
- Da Rosa, J. E. (1983). Economics, politics, and hydroelectric power: the Paraná River Basin. Latin American Research Review, VXVIII (3), pp. 77–107.
- Elhance, A. P. (1999). Hydropolitics in the 3rd World, Conflict and Cooperation in International River Basins. Washington, D.C.: United States Institute of Peace.
- Gleick, P.H., ed. Water in Crisis. A Guide to the World's Fresh Water Resources, New York: Oxford University Press, pp. 13–24.
- Kulshreshtha, S.N. (1993). World Water Resources and Regional Vulnerability: Impact of Future Changes. RR-93-10, IIASA, Laxenburg, Austria.
- Lammers, O., Moore, D. and Preakle, K. (1994). Considering the Hidrovia: a preliminary report on the status of the proposed Paraguay/Parana waterway project. Working Paper 3. Berkeley, California: International Rivers Network, July.
- Transboundary Freshwater Dispute Database (TFDD) (2007). Oregon State University. Available on-line at: http://www.transboundarywaters.orst.edu/
- United Nations. (1978). Register of international rivers, Water Supply Management, 2 (1). New York: Pergamon Press.
