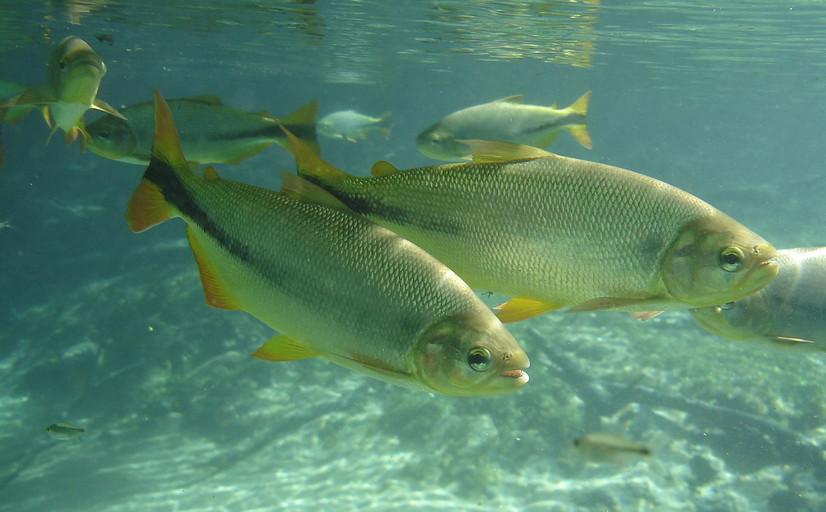
- Brycon hilarii

Scientific classification
- Kingdom: Animalia
- Phylum: Chordata
- Class: Actinopterygii
- Order: Characiformes
- Family: Bryconidae
- Subfamily: Bryconinae; C. H. Eigenmann, 1912

Type genus
- Brycon Müller & Troschel, 1844

Genera
- See text

= Bryconinae =

Subfamily of fishes

Bryconinae is a subfamily of freshwater ray-finned fishes, one of two subfamilies in the family Bryconidae, the other being Salmininae. The fishes in this family are found in Central and South America.

== Genera ==
Bryconinae contains the following genera:

- Brycon Müller & Troschel, 1844
- Chilobrycon Géry & de Rham, 1981
- Henochilus Garman, 1890
