= Chilobrycon =

Conservation status
- Near Threatened (IUCN 3.1)

Scientific classification
- Kingdom: Animalia
- Phylum: Chordata
- Class: Actinopterygii
- Division: Teleostei
- Order: Characiformes
- Family: Bryconidae
- Genus: Chilobrycon; Géry & de Rham, 1981
- Species: C. deuterodon

Binomial name
- Chilobrycon deuterodon Géry & de Rham, 1981

Genus of fishes

Chilobrycon is a monospecific genus of freshwater ray-finned fish belonging to the family Bryconidae, the doradas and jaw characins. The only species in the genus is Chilobrycon deuterodon. This genus is classified in the subfamily Bryconinae, in the family Bryconidae, within the suborder Characoidei of the order Characiformes.

This taxon is endemic to the Tumbes River on the Pacific slope of northern Peru, inhabiting tropical, freshwater environments. C. deuterodon can reach about 10.8 cm (4.3 in) in length.
