= Henochilus =

Conservation status
- Near Threatened (IUCN 3.1)

Scientific classification
- Kingdom: Animalia
- Phylum: Chordata
- Class: Actinopterygii
- Order: Characiformes
- Family: Bryconidae
- Subfamily: Bryconinae
- Genus: Henochilus; Garman, 1890
- Species: H. wheatlandii

Binomial name
- Henochilus wheatlandii Garman, 1890

Genus of fishes

Henochilus is a monospecific genus of freshwater ray-finned fish belonging to the family Bryconidae, the dorados and jaw characins. The only species in the genus is Henochilus wheatlandii. This genus is classified in the subfamily Bryconinae, in the family Bryconidae, within the suborder Characoidei of the order Characiformes. This taxon is endemic to Brazil, where it is native to the Mucuri and Doce River basins.

It is a Critically Endangered species, and now restricted to the Santo Antônio River, a tributary of the Doce River. It had been considered extinct for more than a century, until rediscovered in 1996. This species is known to feed on plants. It can reach up to 41.3 cm (16.3 in) in standard length.

Henochilus means "one-lipped", an allusion to this fish having a lip on the lower jaw but no lip on the upper jaw. The specific name honors Henry Wheatland (1812–1893), who was president of the Essex Institute in Salem, Massachusetts, United States, which published the description of the fish.

This species inhabits blackwater rivers and undergoes ontogenetic niche shift: a 78.2 mm (3.08 in) individual consumed chironomid midge larvae and some filamentous algae, a 134.1 mm (5.28 in) fish ate aquatic plants (Poaceae, Commelinaceae such as Tradescantia) from the riparian zone, and a 225.6 mm (8.88 in) individual had "numerous seeds of submerged or semi-submerged macrophytes (Podostemaceae) that grow on boulders in areas of rapid water flow, along with one coleopteran (Cerambicidae) and one ant (Formicidae)." This shift is apparently facilitated by a change in morphology of both the dentition and the digestive tract as the fish grows.
