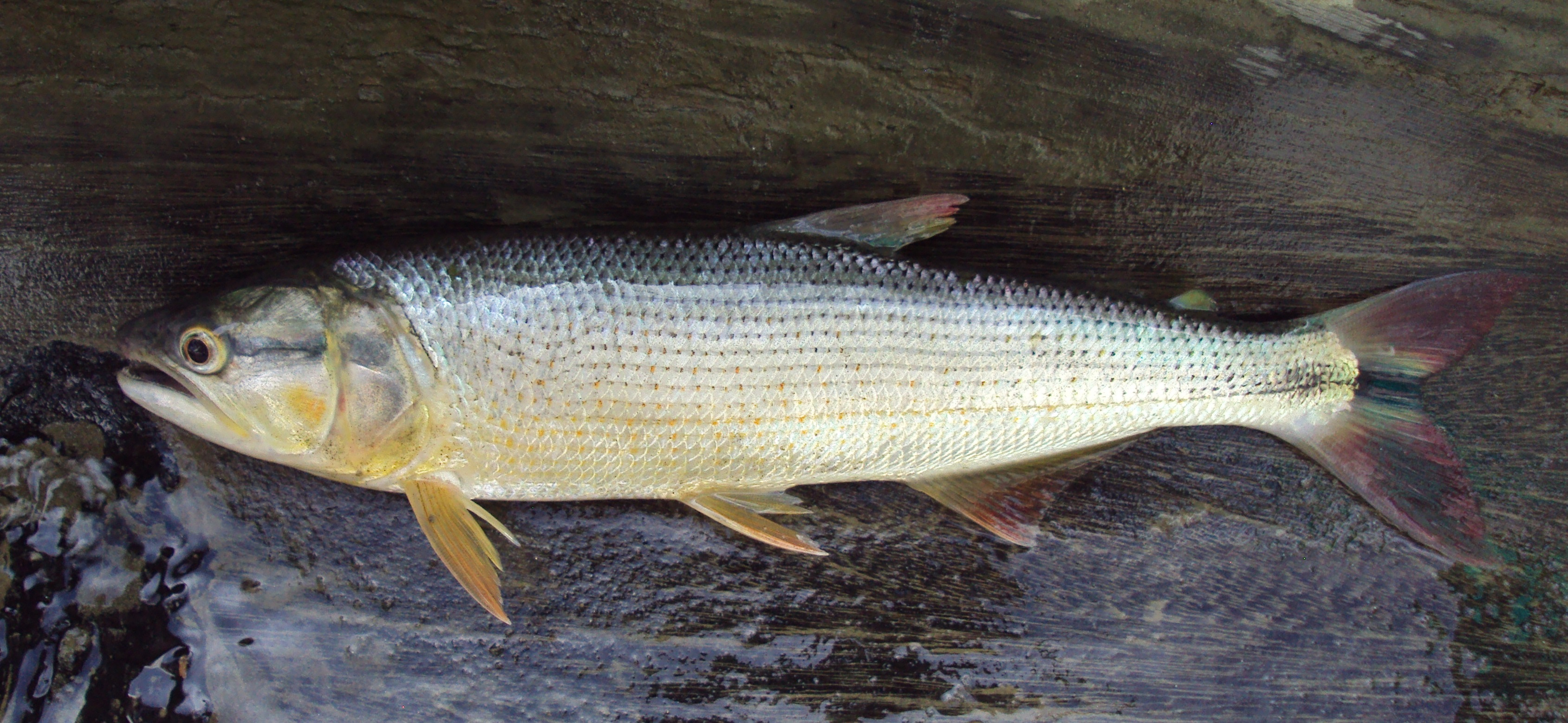

Conservation status
- Data Deficient (IUCN 3.1)

Scientific classification
- Kingdom: Animalia
- Phylum: Chordata
- Class: Actinopterygii
- Order: Characiformes
- Family: Bryconidae
- Genus: Salminus
- Species: S. affinis

Binomial name
- Salminus affinis Steindachner, 1880

= Salminus affinis =

Species of fish

Salminus affinis is a species of freshwater ray-finnned fish belonging to the family Bryconidae, the dorados or jaw characins. This species is endemic to Colombia, where it occurs in the Magdalena-Cauca, Sinú, and Rancheria drainage systems. This benthopelgic fish reaches a maximum standard length of 46.5 cm (18.3 in) and has a maximum published weight of 2.3 kg (5.1 lb), although a fish with a total length of 80 cm (31 in) was caught by an angler in the Rio Naré, in the Rio Magdalena basin.

== See also ==
- Salminus hilarii
