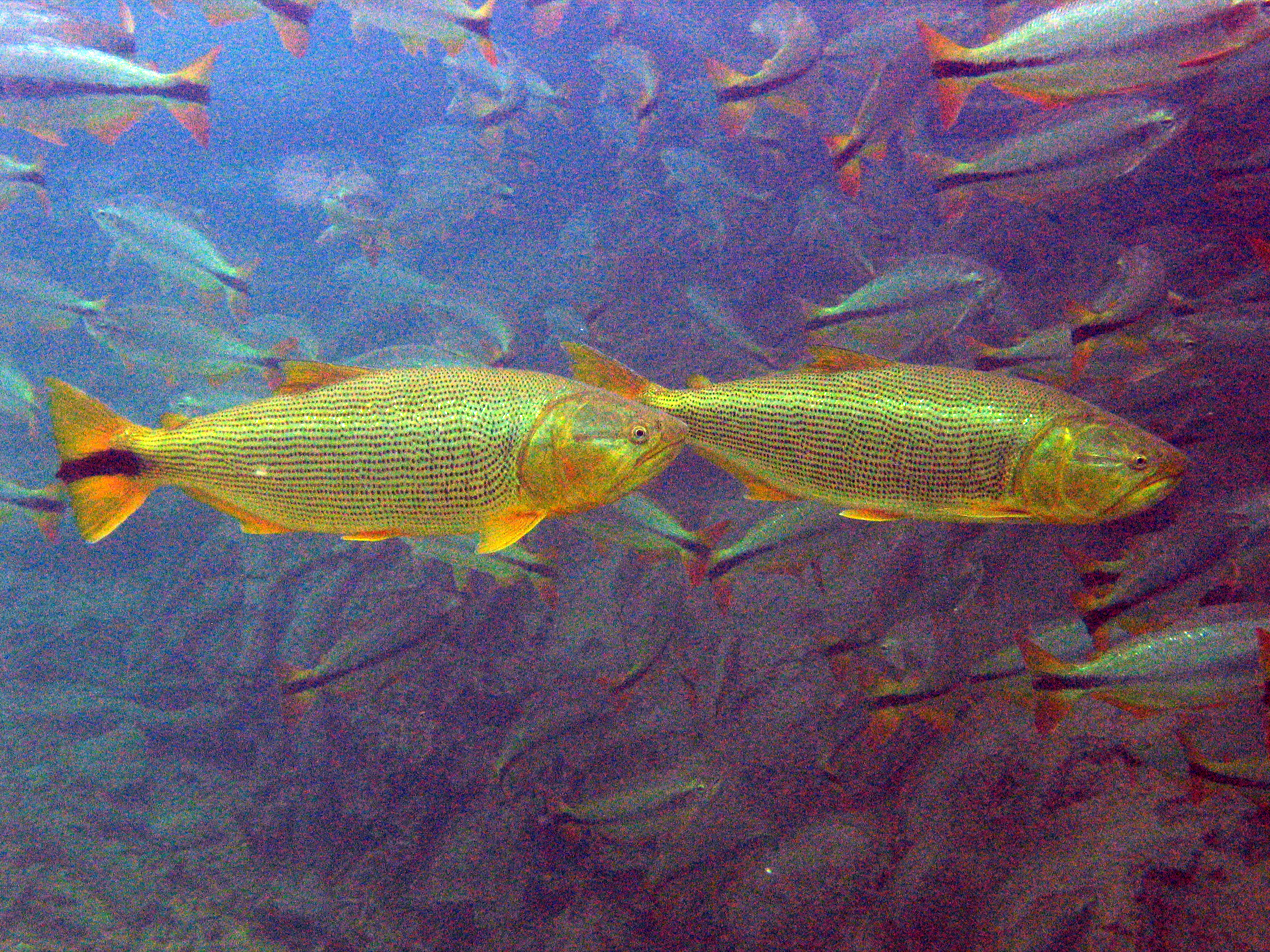
- Two large bryconids in Bonito: Salminus brasiliensis (foreground) and Brycon hilarii (background)

Scientific classification
- Kingdom: Animalia
- Phylum: Chordata
- Class: Actinopterygii
- (unranked): Otophysi
- Order: Characiformes
- Suborder: Characoidei
- Family: Bryconidae; C. H. Eigenmann, 1912

Type genus
- Brycon Müller & Troschel, 1844

Subfamilies
- see text

= Bryconidae =

Bryconidae Temporal range: Oligocene to present

Family of fishes

Bryconidae, also known as bryconids, is a family of freshwater fishes belonging to the order Characiformes. They are native to South America. Some species reach particularly large sizes for characins, with Salminus franciscanus being one of the largest characiforms overall.

Genera:

- Family Bryconidae C. H. Eigenmann, 1912
  - Subfamily Bryconinae Eigenmann, 1912
    - Genus Brycon Müller & Troschel, 1844
    - Genus Chilobrycon Géry & de Rham, 1981
    - Genus Henochilus Garman, 1890
  - Subfamily Salmininae Cockerell, 1915
    - Genus Salminus Agassiz, 1829

The earliest known fossil member of this group is †Brycon avus (Woodward, 1898) from the Oligocene-aged Tremembé Formation of Brazil. A slightly older potential specimen of B. avus is also known from the Late Eocene/Early Oligocene of the Aiuruoca Basin.

The following cladogram based on a 2014 maximum likelihood phylogenetic tree of Bryconidae. It recovers the consensus that Brycon is not monophyletic as the genus encompasses multiple lineages:

- ⊞Brycon + Chilobrycon
  ⊟
  - Brycon chagrensis
  - - Brycon petrosus
    - - Chilobrycon deuterodon
      - - Brycon aff. atrocaudatus
        - Brycon henni
- - ⊞Salminus
    ⊟
    - Salminus hilarii
    - - - Salminus affinis
        - Salminus sp.
      - - Salminus franciscanus
        - Salminus brasiliensis
  - ⊞Brycon + Henochilus
    ⊟
    - Brycon pesu
    - - - Brycon moorei
        - - Brycon orthotaenia
          - Brycon orbygnianus
          - Brycon hilarii
          - Brycon gouldingi
          - Brycon amazonicus
      - - - Brycon falcatus (Type)
          - Brycon melanopterus
        - - Brycon opalinus
          - - Brycon nattereri
            - - - Henochilus wheatlandii
                - Brycon sp.
              - - Brycon vermelha
                - Brycon insignis
                - Brycon ferox

The most recent common ancestor of Bryconidae is thought to have originated in Northwestern South America.
