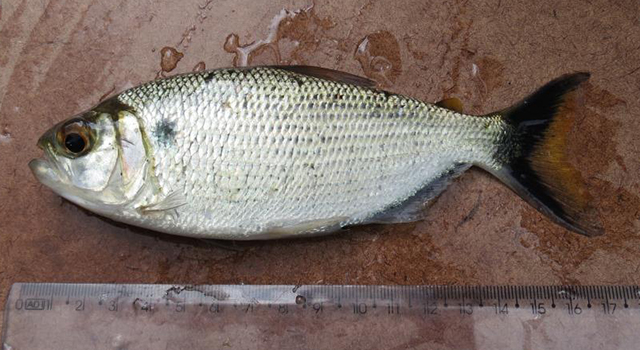

Conservation status
- Least Concern (IUCN 3.1)

Scientific classification
- Kingdom: Animalia
- Phylum: Chordata
- Class: Actinopterygii
- Order: Characiformes
- Family: Bryconidae
- Genus: Brycon
- Species: B. falcatus

Binomial name
- Brycon falcatus J. P. Müller & Troschel, 1844

Synonyms
- Chalceus labrosus Jardine, 1841; Brycon schomburgkii J. P. Müller & Troschel, 1844; Brycon brevicauda Günther, 1864; Brycon stuebelii Steindachner, 1882; Brycon bicolor Pellegrin, 1909; Brycon matrinchao Fowler, 1941

= Brycon falcatus =

Species of fish

Brycon falcatus, the blacktail brycon, is a species of freshwater ray-finned fish belonging to the family Bryconidae, the doradas and jaw characins. This species is found in northern South America.

== Taxonomy ==
Brycon falcatus was first formally described in 1844 by the German zoologists Johannes Peter Müller and Franz Hermann Troschel, with its type locality given as Guyana and Suriname. When Müller and Troschel described this species they proposed a new genus, Brycon, and in 1910 Carl H. Eigenmann designated this species as the type species of the genus Brycon. This genus is classified within the subfamily Bryconinae of the family Bryconidae in the suborder Characoidei of the order Characiformes. In 1841 William Jardine described Chalceus labrosus; this is now considered to be a synonym of B. falcatus and is regarded as a nomen oblitum.

== Etymology ==
Brycon falcatus is the type species of the genus Brycon. This name is derived from the Greek brýchō (βρύχω), which means "to bite", "gnash teeth" or "eat greedily", thought to be an allusion to the fully toothed maxillae of this species. The specific name, falcatus, means "sickle-shaped" in Latin, an allusion to the sickle-shaped black marking on the caudal fin.

== Description ==
Brycon falcatus has a maximum standard length of 48.9 cm (19.3 in) for males and 49.5 cm (19.5 in) for females, and a maximum published weight of 2.7 kg (6.0 lb).

== Distribution and habitat ==
Brycon falcatus is widespread in rivers draining the Brazilian and Guiana Shields in the Amazon, Orinoco, and Guyanese river systems. It is also found in some scattered localities in the western part of the Amazon drainage basin. It is found in larger streams and rivers, where it is a long-distance migrant. The length and duration of the migration of this fish varies geographically. In the Orinoco it moves from blackwater, where they spend the dry season, into flooded forest in the wet season. In the Amazon it shows a preference for whitewater areas.
