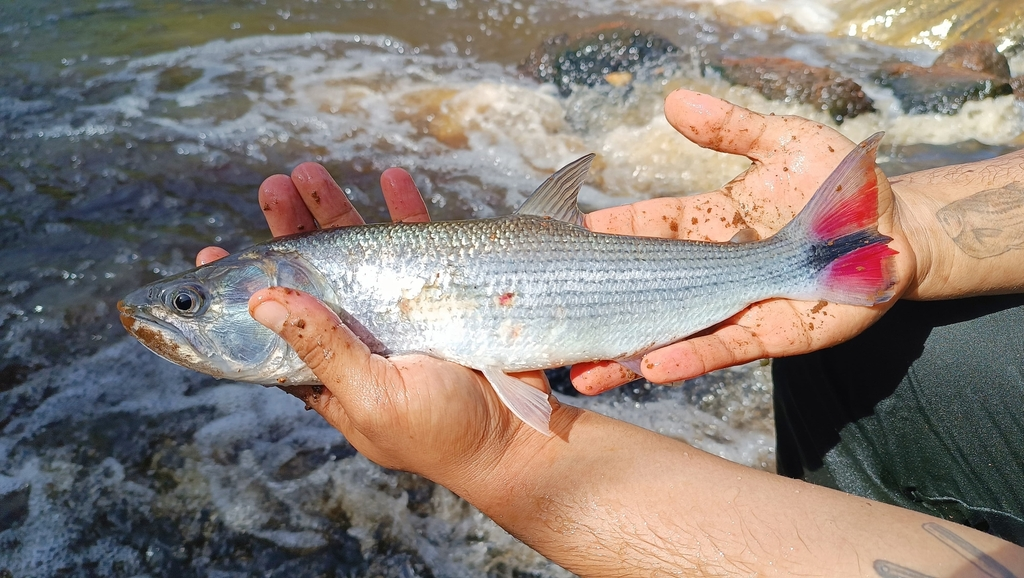

Conservation status
- Least Concern (IUCN 3.1)

Scientific classification
- Kingdom: Animalia
- Phylum: Chordata
- Class: Actinopterygii
- Order: Characiformes
- Family: Bryconidae
- Genus: Salminus
- Species: S. hilarii

Binomial name
- Salminus hilarii Valenciennes, 1850

Synonyms
- Brycon erythrura Fowler, 1941

= Salminus hilarii =

Species of fish

Salminus hilarii, the tabarana, is a species of freshwater ray-finned fish belonging to the family Bryconidae, the doradas and jaw characins. This fish is found in Argentina, Brazil and Paraguay.

== Taxonomy ==
Salminus hilarii was first formally described in 1850 by Achille Valenciennes in volume 22 of Histoire naturelle des poissons by Cuvier and Valenciennes, published in 1850. The type locality was given as the Rio São Francisco in Brazil. This species is classified in the genus Salminus, the only genus in the subfamily Salmininae which is one of two subfamilies in the family Bryconidae. The family Bryconidae is part of the suborder Characoidei in the order Characiformes.

== Etymology ==
Salminus hilarii is classified in the genus Salminus, a name which suffixes -inus onto the Latin name for salmon, Salmo. This is an allusion to the salmon-like body shape and adipose fin of S. brevidens, the type species of the genus. The specific name honours the French botanist Auguste de Saint-Hilaire, the collector of the holotype.

== Description ==
Salminus hilarii has a maximum standard length of 50 cm (20 in) and a maximum weight of 1.4 kg (3.1 lb). S. hilarii typically has differing scale counts from the sympatric S. franciscanus. It also differs in having a silvery rather than golden colour, especially over the face and on the pectoral girdle.

== Distribution and habitat ==
Salminus hilarii is found in Argentina, Brazil and Paraguay in the drainages of the São Francisco, Paraná and Jaguaribe Rivers. This fish is migratory, and breeds in the period known in Brazil as the piracema. It can be found in rivers and streams, sometimes in lakes on the floodplains.

== Utilisation ==
Salminus hilarii is utilised as a food fish, especially in the Jaguaribe.
