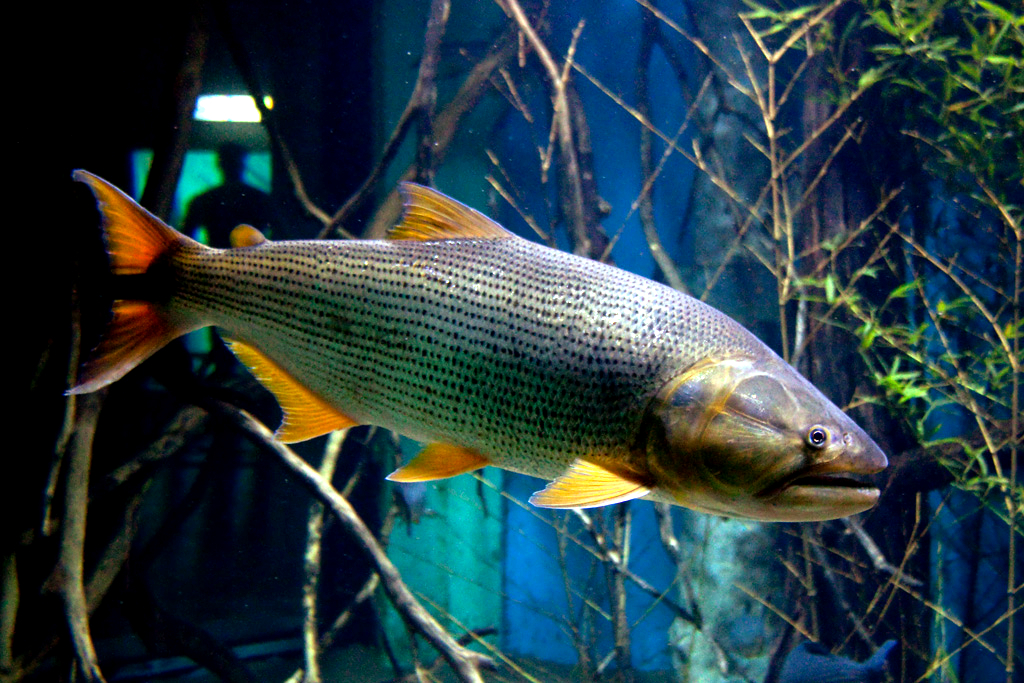
- Salminus franciscanus

Scientific classification
- Kingdom: Animalia
- Phylum: Chordata
- Class: Actinopterygii
- Order: Characiformes
- Family: Bryconidae
- Subfamily: Salmininae; Cockerell, 1915
- Genus: Salminus; Agassiz, 1829

Type species
- Hydrocyon brevidens Cuvier, 1819

Species
- see text

= Salminus =

Salminus Temporal range: Late Miocene–present

Genus of freshwater fish

Salminus, popularly known as dorado or dourado, is a genus of relatively large (up to 1.3–1.4 m or 4.3–4.6 ft long), predatory freshwater fish from the family Bryconidae, of which they are the only members of the subfamily Salmininae. They are native to large tropical and subtropical rivers in South America, and undertake migrations during the rainy season to spawn. They are very popular among recreational anglers and also support important commercial fisheries.

== Species ==
Significant taxonomic confusion has surrounded this genus, and until a review in 1990, several additional species were recognised (most of these are junior synonyms of S. brasiliensis). Although known for more than 150 years, S. franciscanus was only scientifically described in 2007. The following valid species are recognised:

- Salminus affinis Steindachner, 1880
- Salminus brasiliensis (G. Cuvier, 1816) (dorado/golden dorado)
- Salminus franciscanus Lima & Britski, 2007
- Salminus hilarii Valenciennes, 1850
- Salminus iquitensis (Nakashima, 1941)
- †Salminus noriegai Cione & Azpelicueta, 2013
- Salminus santosi Lima, 2022

† = extinct
