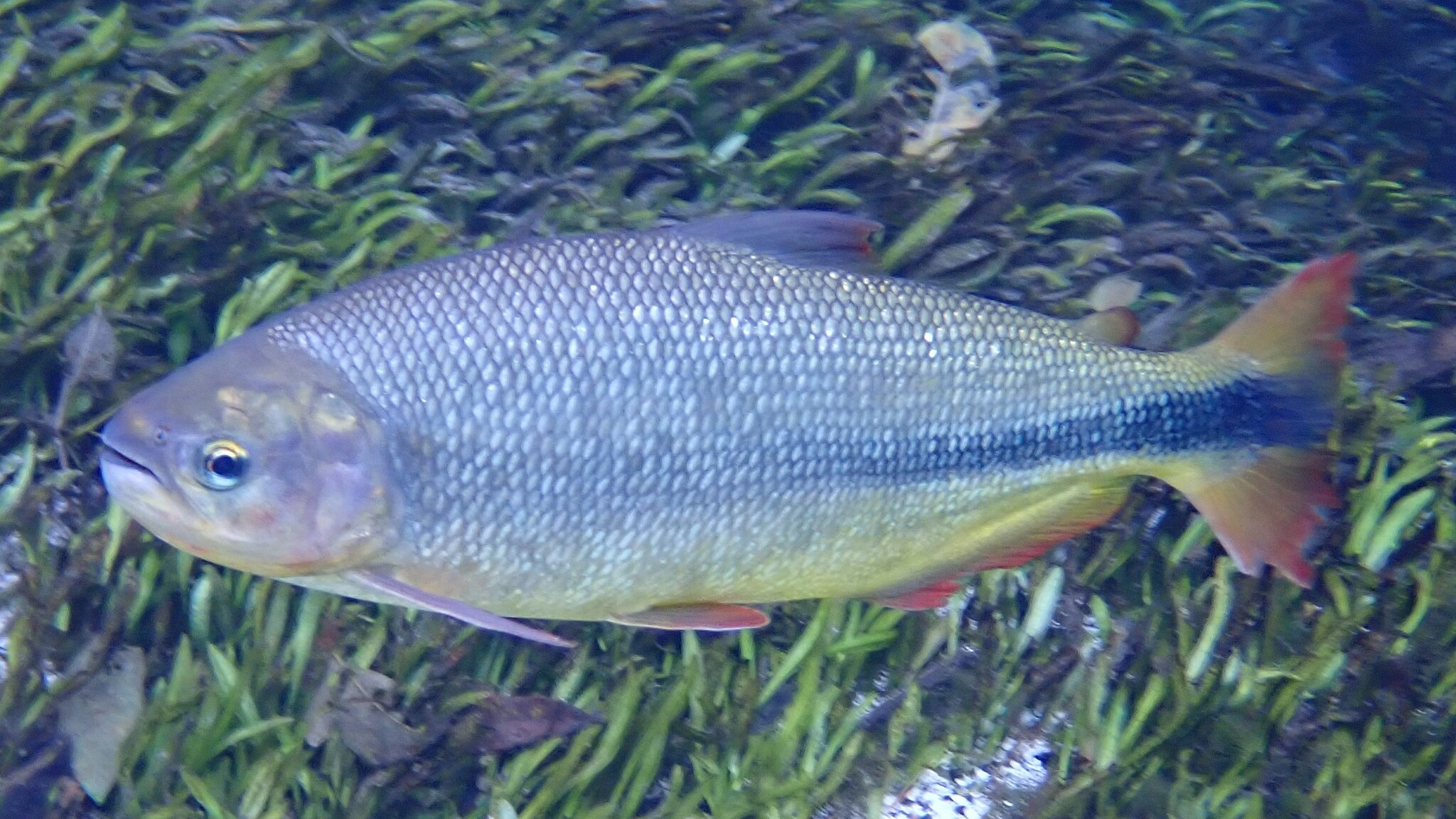

Conservation status
- Least Concern (IUCN 3.1)

Scientific classification
- Kingdom: Animalia
- Phylum: Chordata
- Class: Actinopterygii
- Division: Teleostei
- Order: Characiformes
- Family: Bryconidae
- Genus: Brycon
- Species: B. hilarii

Binomial name
- Brycon hilarii (Valenciennes, 1850)

Synonyms
- Chalceus hilarii Valenciennes, 1850; Salmo paraputanga Kner, 1860; Brycon melanoxanthus Kner, 1860; Brycon microlepis Perugia, 1897

= Brycon hilarii =

Species of South American characin fish

Brycon hilarii, one of the species commonly known as piraputanga or pirapitinga, is a freshwater fish inhabiting South America. The species grows to 56 cm (22 in) and 3.4 kg (7.5 lb). The specific name hilarii honors the holotype's collector, Auguste de Saint-Hilaire.

Brycon hilarii can be distinguished from the sympatric Brycon orbignyanus through counting the scales along the lateral line and caudal peduncle (more on average in B. hilarii), as well as a yellow coloration in this species compared to B. orbignyanus' silver coloration.

It primarily inhabits the Paraguay and Paraná river basins, though may also inhabit the upper Amazon basin. In 2025, the species was first reported from the Uruguay River, as well as the Rio Santiago, part of the Río de la Plata. B. hilarii is benthopelagic, and prefers clear, oxygen rich waters. Evidence of gene flow suggests a migratory habit, though some populations of this species remain genetically distinct from others.

Though an omnivore, Brycon hilarii eats significant amounts of seeds and fruit; Erythrina fusca is a common food item in certain areas. The seeds of multiple plant species, such as Ficus spp. (figs), Gomphrena elegans, and Psidium sartorianum, may survive ingestion by these fish and then grow a significant distance away from the parent tree. This fish-borne seed dispersal (ichthyocory) is also performed by other species such as Brycon opalinus and Brycon amazonicus. Macrophytes, along with small vertebrates and invertebrates (such as crustaceans) are also eaten by B. hilarii; the apple snail Pomacea canaliculata was noted to be an important food item.

Brycon hilarii is primarily valued as a foodfish, though it is also considered a gamefish and is sometimes seen in aquaria; the species has been aquacultured for various purposes, such as stocking.
