= Fishing industry in Peru =

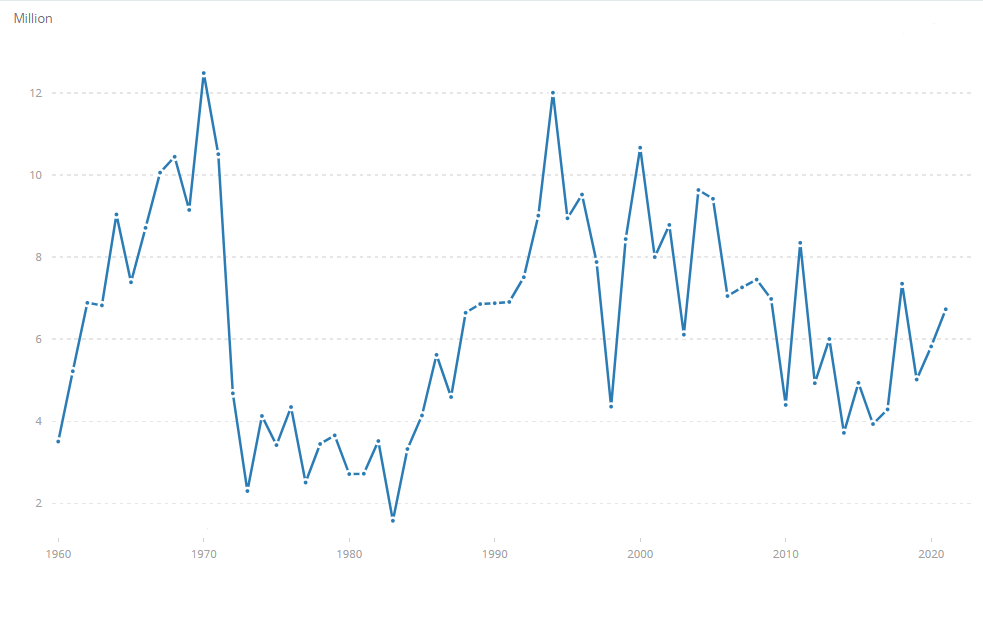
- Chart of Peru's total catch of fish, including aquaculture, from 1960 to 2021

General characteristics
- Coastline: 2,414 km (1,500 mi)
- EEZ area: 857,000 km^{2} (331,000 sq mi)
- Lake area: 5,220 km^{2} (2,020 sq mi)
- Land area: 1,279,996 km^{2} (494,209 sq mi)
- MPA area: 66,311 km^{2} (25,603 sq mi) *designated, only about 3,970 km^{2} (1,530 sq mi) fully implemented/protected
- Employment: Between 160,000 and 232,000 (2013)
- Fishing fleet: Large-scale: 661 Small-scale: 9,667 (2010)
- Consumption: 21.4 kg (47 lb) fish per capita (2007)
- Fisheries GDP: US$473 million (2006)
- Export value: US$2.335 billion (2008)
- Import value: US$60.6 million (2008)

Harvest
- Wild inland: 43,000 tonnes (47,000 tons) (2007)
- Aquaculture total: 43,000 tonnes (47,000 tons) (2008)
- Fish total: 7,353,000 tonnes (8,105,000 tons) (2008)

Fishing in Peru has existed for thousands of years, beginning as small fishing communities who lived off the ocean. By the 1400s, these communities became organized under the Inca Empire, and they developed, or had already developed, economic specialization.

Fishing and fisheries did not develop economically until post-World War II. Economic development came as a result of the fishmeal industry, which largely depended on fishing Peruvian anchovetas. The industry allowed the economy to expand and, by the 1960s, Peru became the largest single-species fishery in the world; however, the industry collapsed in the 1970s as a result of the 1972 Peruvian anchoveta crisis, triggered primarily by overfishing and an El Niño event.

A state-owned corporation, Pesca Perú, was created to take over the commercial fishing industry after its collapse. The corporation would continue its control over the industry until reprivatization efforts emerged in 1991 and concluded in 1998. Another El Niño event in 1998 disrupted landings again and caused several companies to go bankrupt due to the shortage of landings.

Fishing continues as a major sector of the economy of Peru. In 2008, the sector fished over 7.3 million tonnes of aquatic resources, from both the Pacific Ocean and from inland waters. Most recently, in 2022 the sector fished over 5.5 million tonnes of aquatic resources. It is also the largest fishmeal producer, surpassing the European Union's production by over 50,000 tonnes in 2018. As the largest fishmeal and fish oil producer, it typically accounts for between one-fourth and one-third of global trade. Aquaculture is another industry that has seen major development and growth, expanding from just about 6,500 tonnes in 2000 to over 140,000 tonnes in 2022. The fishing industry in Peru is a major source of employment, providing over 121,000 with jobs in 1999, over 145,000 in 2007, somewhere between 160,000 and 232,000 jobs in 2013, and supporting about 700,000 jobs in 2021, as stated by The Economist.

Several governmental and non-profit organizations exist that play a major role in the Peruvian fishing industry, whether through creating and enforcing regulations, funding projects and programs, collecting data, or other activities.

== Fishing areas ==
Fishing largely takes place in the Pacific Ocean and along Peru's coastline, as well as in inland areas like lakes and rivers.

=== EEZ/Mar de Grau and marine protected areas (MPAs) ===
The Mar de Grau

The EEZ of Peru extends 200 nautical miles off the coast. The corresponding territorial claims that Peru makes matches the area that the EEZ covers and is called the Mar de Grau, named after Miguel Grau Seminario, a military officer who fought against Chile in the War of the Pacific. In total, the area is about 857,000 km^{2} (~331,000 square miles), with about 4,030 km^{2} (~1,560 square miles) of that area designated for Peru's eight marine protected areas and for the four marine managed areas.

Since 2017, non-profit organizations such as Oceana and the Wyss Foundation had been endorsing the creation of an MPA in the Nazca Ridge, which would be the largest yet and bring the total percentage of Peru's EEZ under protection from 0.48% to about 6.5%, with the total proposed area approximately 50,000 km^{2}, or about 19,300 square miles. Oceana granted about $845,000 in a two-year program to encourage the creation of the Nazca Ridge MPA, along with other goals like helping complete Peru's marine spatial planning. In October 2019, Peru's minister of the environment Fabiola Muñoz pledged to create the area by 2021. At the United Nations Summit on Biodiversity, held on September 30, 2020, Peru's president Martin Vizcarra announced that he would be creating the area by the end of 2020, also intending to protect 30% of Peru's waters by 2030.

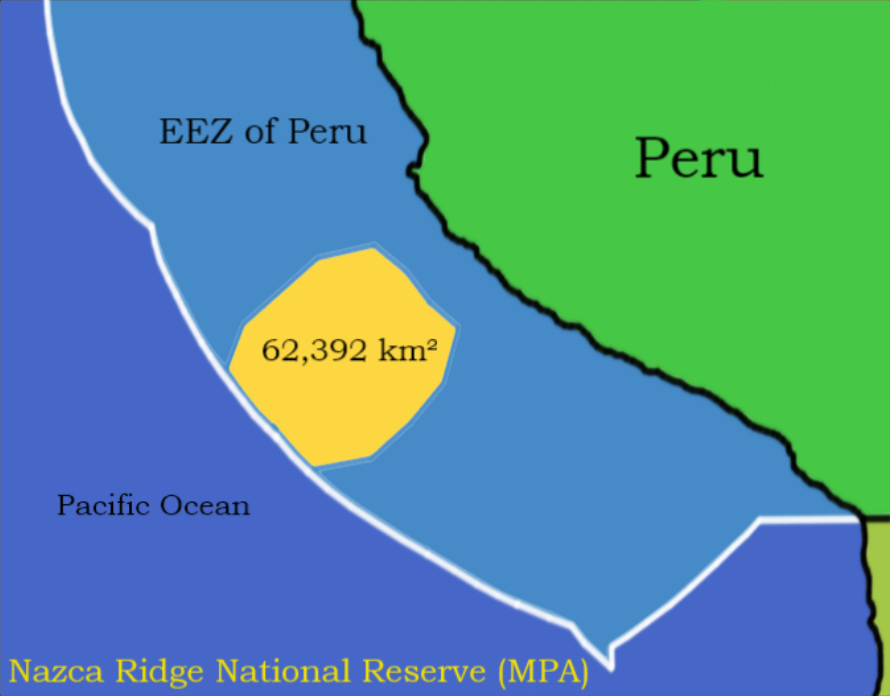
Map of the Nazca Ridge National Reserve (in yellow)

On June 5, 2021, the Peruvian government made a decree that officially established the Nazca Ridge National Reserve MPA, totaling an area of about 62,392 km^{2} (24,089 square miles). In Spanish called the Reserva Nacional Dorsal de Nasca, it covers approximately 7.3% of Peru's EEZ. With its establishment, the percentage of Peru's EEZ under protection rose to about 7.8%, nearly 8%. However, the management of the area is under harsh criticism, as it still permits fishing in a direct-use zone to a depth as far as 1,000 meters, with only strict protection from 1,000 to 4,000 meters. Oceana and some 20 other organizations joined together and called the actions of fishing in protected areas illegal, however, Peru's ministry responded claiming that the amount of fishing would be insignificant.

Chile and Peru are believed to be the creators of the concept of EEZs, as in 1947, both governments agreed upon and established maritime zones 200 nautical miles off of each other's coasts. Although the Peruvian government makes these territorial claims, the claims are not officially recognized by the United States.

=== Inland areas ===
Inland areas experience fishing, although on a smaller scale. Inland fishing occurs mainly in the Amazon Rainforest region of Peru, in the rivers, and in swamps. Fishing also occurs in the Peruvian Sierra and in Lake Titicaca, the largest lake in South America. In 2007, the inland fisheries caught about 43,000 tonnes of fish. Much of the inland fishing is largely artisanal and for subsistence, not necessarily for commercial or productive purposes.

== Fishing ==
=== Artisanal fishing ===
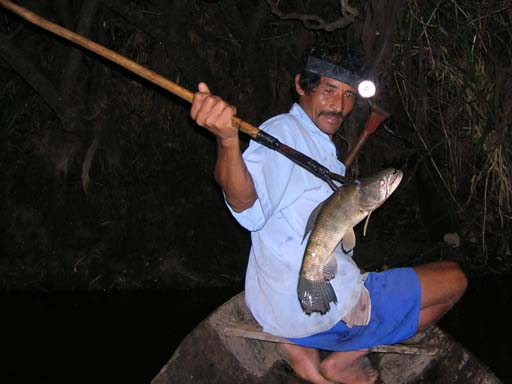
Man spearfishing at night in the Amazon basin in Peru.

Artisanal fishing, as defined by the Food and Agriculture Organization, is composed of individuals that do not have a fishing vessel or have one that has a capacity of up to 32.6 cubic meters and has a length of up to 15 meters. Work should mostly be done manually to be categorized as artisanal fishing. Small-scale fisheries are defined similarly, although they employ modern fishing methods and gear. In 2008, artisanal fishers were reported to have caught about 721,000 tonnes, mostly for direct human consumption, or DHC. Artisanal fishers are said to provide 80% of the fish consumed in Peru, as of 2023. Artisanal fishing is important in Peru as it acts as a good source of employment and food for the working class, mitigating poverty, unemployment, and starvation.

Over 67,000 fishers are employed in the artisanal fishing sector, as of 2020. This is compared to about 28,000 fishers in 1995 and about 37,700 fishers in 2005. The northern region of Peru is especially a source of artisanal fishers, with over 16,000 as of 2019. As of 2005, over half of the fishers have secondary education and about 7.1% have higher education. Every fisher is part of some trade association, trade union, marine association, collective, or other type of organization. Artisanal fishers have exclusive commercial rights to conduct fishing operations within 5 miles of the Peruvian coast, although fishing may extend beyond 10 nautical miles. About 200 fishing settlements are involved along the coast, harvesting over 220 different species of marine life. The marine artisanal fishery contributed an average 19% of the total annual catch between 2004 and 2017. Artisanal fishers utilize several different fishing gears and methods, including driftnet, hook-and-line, compressor diving, purse seine, surface longline, and trawl nets. They also use their hands to gather sea resources such as algae and mollusks.

Inland artisanal fishers control the most important inland fishery in the Peruvian Amazon and they mainly fish for subsistence. The region caught over 36,600 tonnes in 2005 and 25,300 tonnes in 2013. Local artisanal inland fishing also occurs in rivers such as the Jequetepeque River.

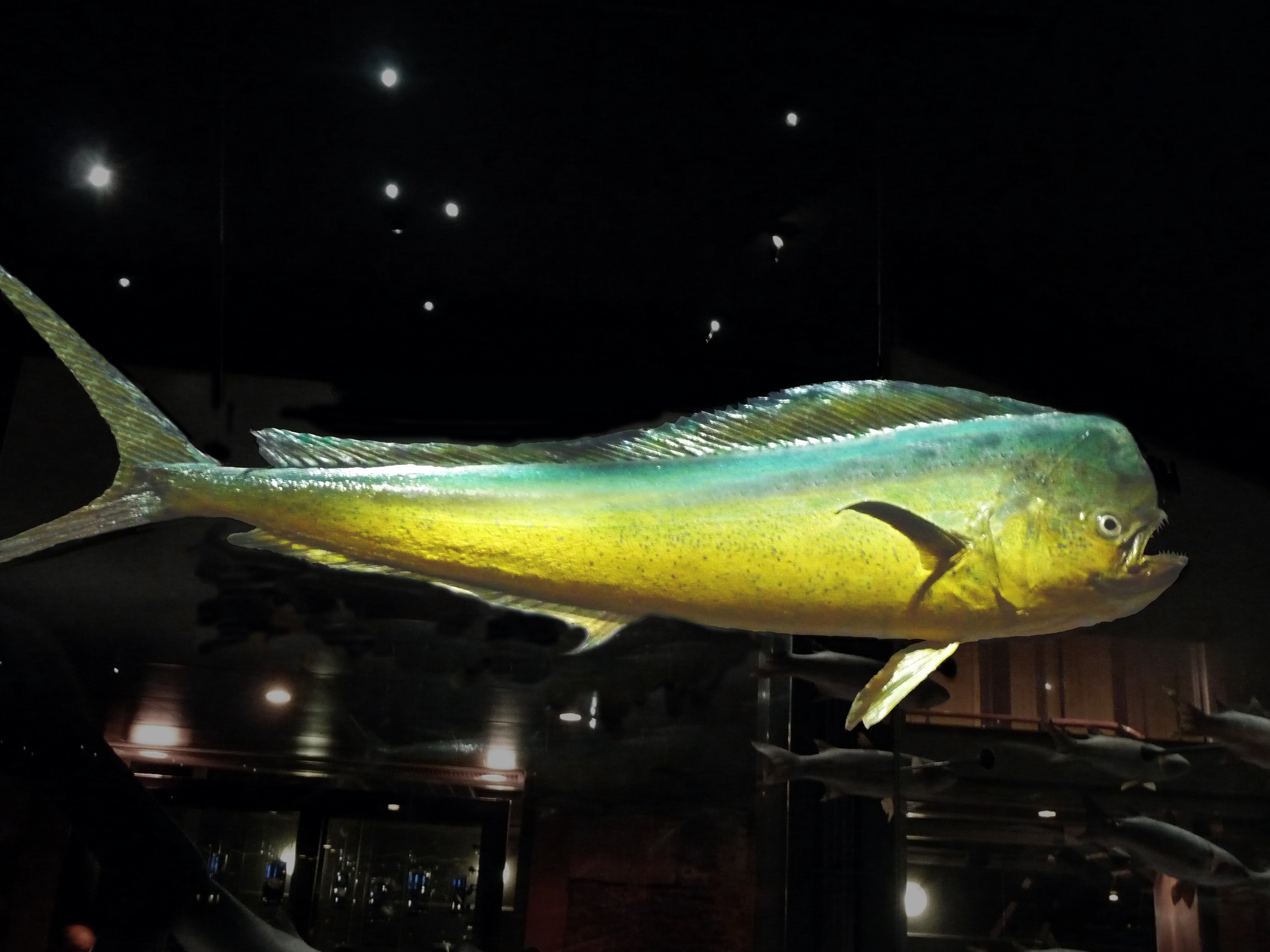
Dolphinfish, or mahi-mahi (Coryphaena hippurus)

One major target species of artisanal fishers is the jumbo flying squid. Artisanal fishers make up most of the jumbo flying squid fishery. The artisanal fleet contributes to 45% of the world's catch of jumbo flying squid, having caught over 500,000 tonnes in 2019. This accounts annually for about 9% to 15% of the Peruvian fisheries sector's GDP, producing over US$850 million in exports in 2019, with 30% exported to the United States and European Union. Over US$180 million in revenue was produced by the fishery in 2020. Between 2010 and 2019, 38% of the jumbo flying squid catch was used for DHC and represented 59% of the value of seafood exports used for DHC. Over 20,000 fishers are believed to be directly employed in the jumbo flying squid fishery, as of 2018. This figured has grown to about 31,200 people employed to directly catch the squid, and 12,000 employed to process frozen squid products, as of 2020.

Mahi-mahi, also known as the dolphinfish, is another major target species of artisanal fishers. It is the second-largest artisanal fishery, just behind the jumbo flying squid fishery, providing jobs for over 10,000 fishers. 50% of the world's catch of dolphinfish is from Peru, generating between US$90 million and US$100 million in exports. Altogether, the jumbo flying squid and mahi-mahi fisheries have more than 3,300 vessels.

=== Commercial fishing ===
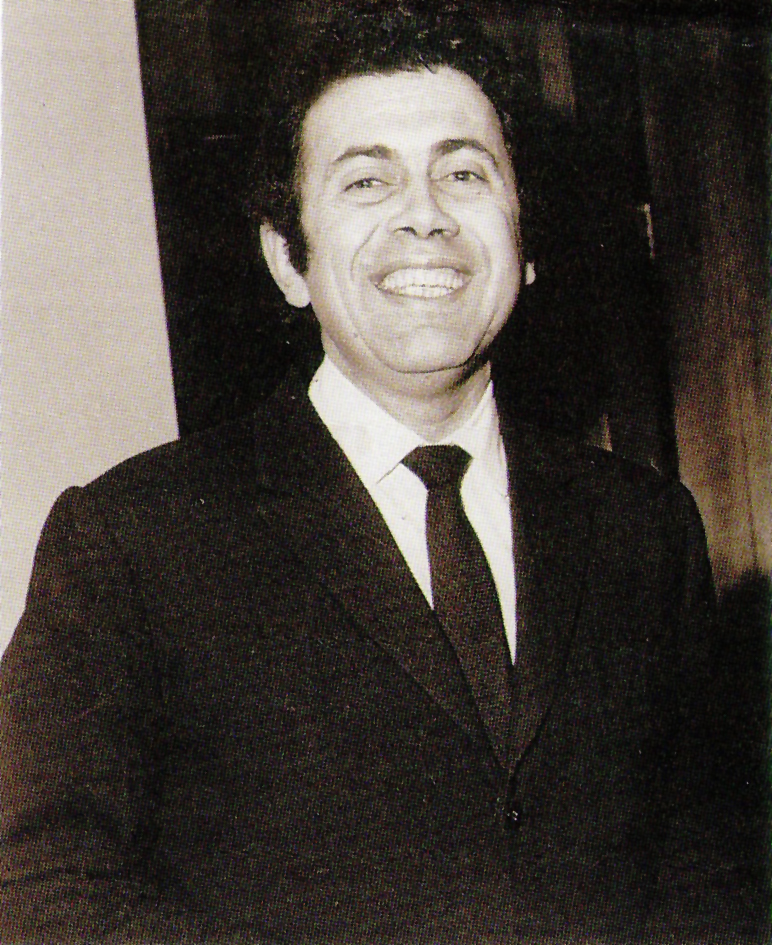
Luis Banchero Rossi, owner of Banchero Rossi, the biggest financial group of the Peruvian fishing industry from 1969 to 1970. He owned 10 fishmeal plants, 115 fishing boats, and accounted for 17% of fishmeal production in Peru.

Commercial fishing has been a major part of the fishing industry in Peru since post-World War II. In 1950, Peru yielded about 72,500 tonnes of fish; However, by the 1960s, Peru became the largest fishing country in the world. There were less than 100 fishing vessels in 1953, but by 1964, there were over 1,600. The primary reason for this development was because of the need for food resources during World War II, and Peru was seen as a possible source for seafood. In 1941, the Peruvian government requested for the United States to conduct a study of their waters, so the US Fish and Wildlife Service conducted a survey and recorded the abundant marine resources, noting that industrial development was possible. Shortly after in the 1950s and 1960s, investors and industrialists began investing into the fishing industry, hoping to seek a profit from the growing industry. Notable investors included Pfizer, General Mills, and the Peruvian industrialist Luis Banchero Rossi.

Commercial fishing in Peru focused mainly on one species, the Peruvian anchoveta, as it can be used to make fishmeal, a highly profitable by-product. As of 2022, the Peruvian anchoveta remains the most captured fish in the Peruvian fishing industry, with 86.7% of all marine landings being the Peruvian anchoveta. At its peak in 1970, the commercial fishing industry landed over 12.5 million tonnes of fish. The fishing industry in Peru continued to thrive until 1972, when a combination of factors, notably heavy overfishing and the 1972-1973 El Niño event, led to the collapse of the industry in the 1972 Peruvian anchoveta crisis. As a result, in 1973, General Juan Velasco Alvarado nationalized the fishmeal industry, replacing it with a state-owned corporation, Pesca Perú, proceeding to take over thousands of assets from over 80 firms, including 1,255 ships and 99 factories. The corporation continued handling the commercial fishing industry until reprivatization efforts emerged starting in 1991 and concluding in 1998. Investment reemerged, although slowed after another El Niño event occurred in 1998 which again substantially lowered landings and drove some companies into bankruptcy. The event resulted in a drop of anchovy catches by 80% and a reduction of exports by 66%. Landings rebounded the next year in 1999 back to over 8.4 million tonnes of total fish landings.

As of 2024, commercial fishing continues yielding millions of tonnes of fish landings every year. Most recently in 2022, 5.5 million tonnes of fish were caught. The subsectors for fishmeal, fish oil, canned, frozen, and cured products also produce thousands of tonnes of products every year.

==== Fishmeal and fish oil industry ====
A large part of commercial fishing in Peru is the fishmeal and fish oil industry. Typically, Peru is responsible for nearly 50% of the global supply of fishmeal and for about one-third of the global supply of fish oil. Fishmeal and fish oil production emerged from the canning industry in the 1930s as byproducts, but in the 1950s, began to develop as a new industry as private firms began to specialize in fishmeal processing, with 49 plants initially. By the 1960s, the processing plants peaked at 154, and by 1964, Peru produced about 40% of the global supply of fishmeal. At its peak in 1970, over 2.2 million tonnes of fishmeal were produced, and over a third of Peruvian exports were from fishmeal and fish oil. In the late 1950s, fishmeal had begun losing value, so to maintain high prices, the Consorcio Pesquero was created, led by Luis Banchero Rossi. It initially controlled about 92% of fishmeal production, although as other consortiums were created, lowered to about 60%. The consortium helped expand the fishmeal market in the United States, Europe, and Asia through warehouses, terminals, representatives, and agents.

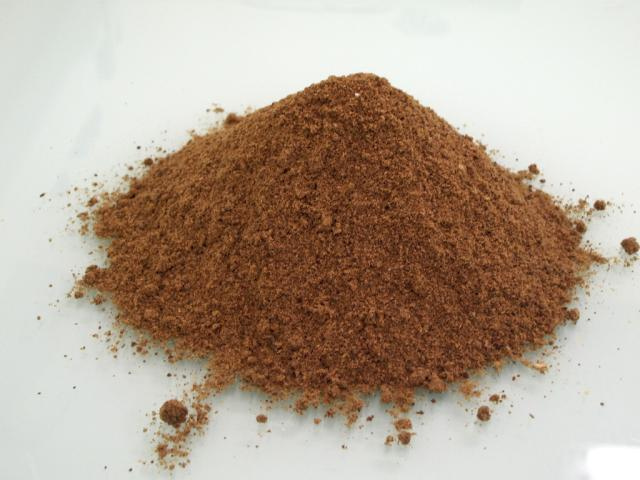
Fishmeal

In April 1970, the Peruvian military government, established earlier in a 1968 coup d'état, created the Empresa Pública de Comercialización de Harina y Aceite de Pescado (Public Enterprise for Commercialisation of Fishmeal and Fish Oil), or EPCHAP. It replaced the Consorcio Pesquero and its competitors and nationalized the distribution sector of the fishing industry. Later after the fishing industry collapsed due to the 1972 Peruvian anchoveta crisis, the remaining two sectors of extraction and processing were nationalized under Pesca Perú. The fishmeal and fish oil industry were a major part of the processing sector, so until Pesca Perú began liquidation between 1991 and 1998, its operations were mainly controlled by the government.

The fishmeal and fish oil industry has recovered since then. In 2012, there were 160 fishmeal processing plants. As of 2024, about 124 fishmeal processing plants are in operation in Peru. The average fishmeal price in 2022 was about US$1,642 per tonne. Fishmeal exports in 2022 accounted for about US$1.8 billion. In 2023, fishmeal's main export markets included China at 79%, with other important markets including Ecuador, Japan, Germany, and Taiwan.

In 2023 and 2024, another El Niño event produced some negative effects on the economy, anchovy catch, fishmeal, and fish oil production. Due to a lack of anchovy catch, some fishmeal factories had to close down. In the first eight months of 2023, compared to 2022, fishmeal production was down by 28% and fish oil production was down by 24%. According to Reuters, the Peruvian government would have to spend about USD$1.06 billion to combat the economic and climatic effects of El Niño. As a result, exports accounted for about US$926 million, a significantly lesser value compared to US$1.8 billion in 2022. The average fishmeal price in 2023 was about US$1,723 per tonne, an approximate 5% increase from the previous year.

==== Canned, frozen, and cured products ====
The remainder of commercial fishing results in canned, frozen, and cured products. In 2006, 179 industrial fishery processing plants were in operation, composed of 73 canneries, 93 fish freezing plants, and 13 cured fish products plants. The production capacity of these plants was over 175,000 cans per shift for the canneries, almost 4,000 tonnes per day for the freezing plants, and over 1,200 tonnes per month for the fish curing plants. In 2008, exports for canned, frozen, and cured products amounted to about US$529 million. Domestic consumption per capita in 2008 was 5.5 kg for canned, 2.4 kg for frozen, and 1.1 kg for cured.

The first successful cannery emerged in the 1930s. During World War II, the United States was cut off from its main suppliers of fish products, those being Scandinavia and Japan, so Peru served as a replacement. By 1945, about 23 canneries were operating along the Peruvian coast, six of which were of significance. After WWII in 1946, the Wilbur Ellis Company began earning substantial profits from selling fish liver and smoked/salted fish, primarily used in the European recovery program, also known as the Marshall Plan. Production peaked between 1955 and 1959, with over 21,000 tonnes of canned fish produced.

In 2008, exported canned fish products amounted to about US$89 million, with a volume of about 39,100 tonnes, or about 3 million cans. In 2008, exported frozen fish products amounted to about US$463 million, with a volume of over 328,000 tonnes. The main export markets for frozen products were China (19%), United States (17.2%), Spain (16.1%), France (7.9%), South Korea (7.1%), Italy (4%), and Japan (3.5%). In 2023, about 686,000 tonnes of frozen product were produced, and frozen product exports amounted to about US$1.56 billion; about 160,000 tonnes of canned fish products were produced, and canned fish product exports amounted to about US$58 million.

=== Recreational fishing ===
Recreational fishing in Peru has been a major activity since at least the 1950s. While not valuable to the national economy, it is valuable as a social activity and as a pastime. A variety of methods and equipment are used to recreationally fish, including coastal trolling, deep fishing, bottom bait fishing, hand-gathering, bowfishing, and spearfishing. Spearfishing originated in Peru in the early 1950s in Callao and Pucusana when families of Italian descent created the first homemade spearfishing equipment. Recreational fishing occurs both in the marine coasts of Peru and in Peru's inland areas.

==== Marine recreational fishing ====
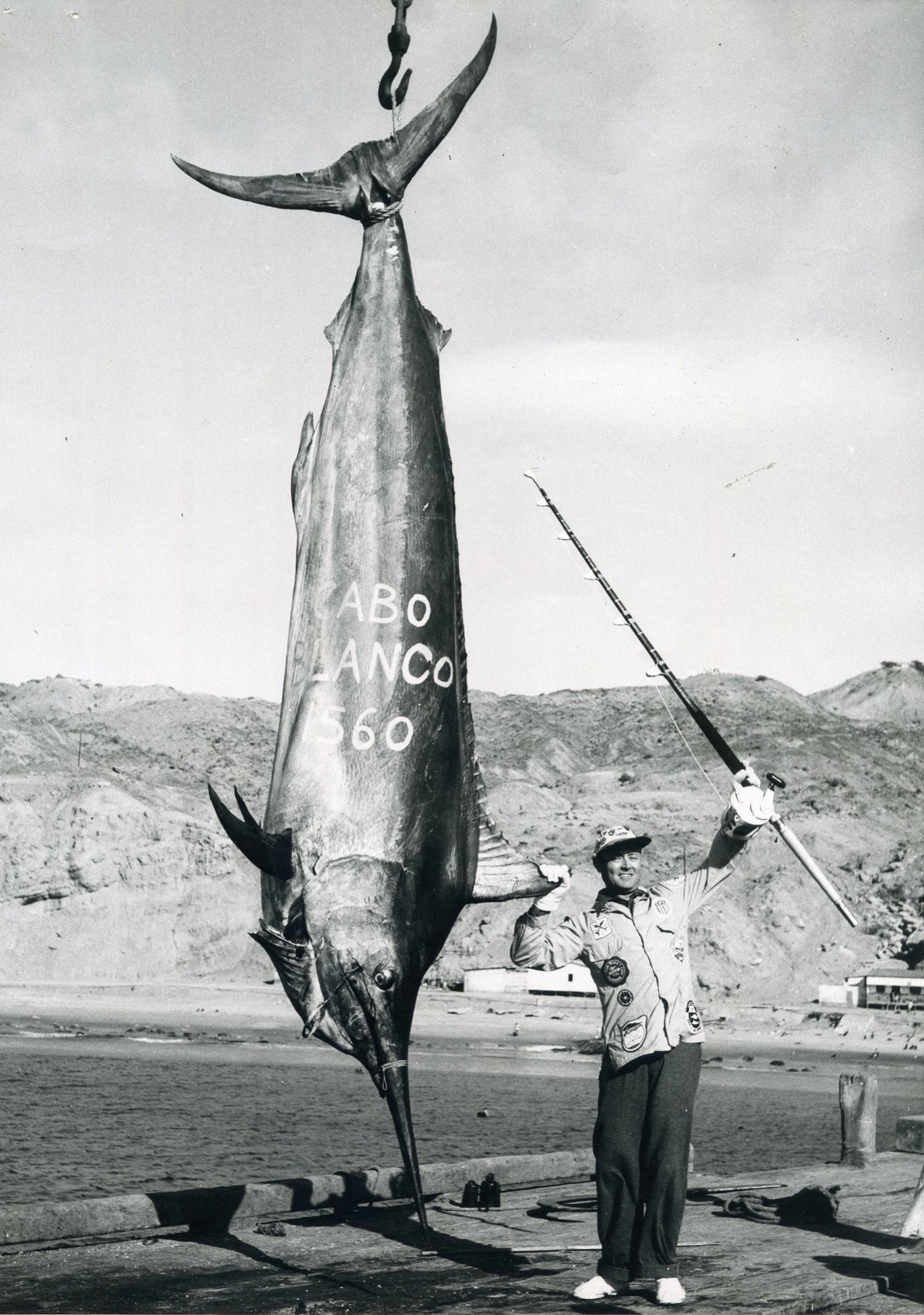
Alfred C. Glassell Jr.'s record-setting black marlin catch

Peru was known for recreational fishing in the 1950s in Cabo Blanco. In the 1930s, recreational fishers in northern Peru had been fishing to catch large fish, and by the 1940s, other anglers were arriving as well. In 1951, a black marlin weighing 373.8 kilograms, or 824 pounds, was caught, the largest of its time in the eastern Pacific. In that same year, construction began of a clubhouse for the Cabo Blanco Fishing Club.

The clubhouse opened in 1953, with a larger facility opening later, in total able to accommodate 32 members and guests. In that same year on August 4, Alfred C. Glassell Jr. was able to catch a 1,560-pound (~707 kg), 14 feet 7 inches (4.445 meters) long black marlin, setting a world record that, as of 2010, still stands as the largest bony fish caught with rod and reel. 1954 would also be a successful year for the club, with 16 fish between 1,005 and over 1,500 pounds caught. In 1956, Ernest Hemingway would visit the clubhouse for the filming of a movie adaptation of his book The Old Man and the Sea. Changing ocean conditions and the dictatorship that would arise in Peru in 1968 led to the decline of the club and its eventual shutdown in 1970.

==== Inland recreational fishing ====
Several freshwater species are of interest to recreational fishing. Cichla monoculus, Hydrolycus scomberoides, Brachyplatystoma flavicans, and Colossoma macropomum are all examples of freshwater fish caught for recreational fishing purposes.

== Fished aquatic life ==
There are thousands of species of freshwater and saltwater fish in Peru, with about 1,011 freshwater species and 1,070 saltwater species recorded. About 220 species of saltwater life are caught by artisanal fishers. Over 50 species of fish are landed for commercial purposes.

=== Marine life ===
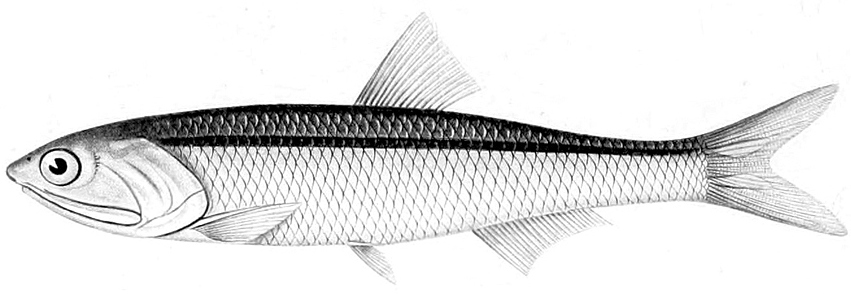
Engraulis ringens, also known as the Peruvian anchoveta

A variety of marine life is fished in Peru. Approximately 220 species of marine life are fished, including by artisanal fishers, with 80% being finfish, 17% being invertebrates, and 2% being algae, with the remaining 1% categorized as other resources. The main fish caught is the Peruvian anchoveta (Engraulis ringens), which, in 2022, accounted for about 86.7% of all marine landings. The majority of Peruvian anchoveta landings are used for industrial purposes to create fishmeal and fish oil.

Besides the Peruvian anchoveta, a large variety of other teleosts are also caught, including the following: Pacific sardine (Sardinops sagax), Chilean jack mackerel (Trachurus murphyi), Pacific chub mackerel (Scomber japonicus), Peruvian hake (Merluccius gayi peruanus), Eastern Pacific bonito (Sarda chiliensis), Longnose anchovy (Anchoa nasus), common dolphinfish (Coryphaena hippurus), flathead grey mullet (Mugil cephalus), Pacific menhaden (Ethmidium maculatum), lumptail searobin (Prionotus stephanophrys) along with other flying fish, palm ruff (Seriolella violacea), the Chilean silverside (Odontesthes regia), the Peruvian rock seabass (Paralabrax humeralis), cabinza grunt (Isacia conceptionis), punctuated snake-eel (Ophichthus remiger), Swordfish (Xiphias gladius), the Peruvian moonfish (Selene peruviana), the Pacific sierra (Scomberomorus sierra), flatfishes (Pleuronectiformes), Paloma pompano (Trachinotus paitensis), the Peruvian grunt (Anisotremus scapularis), the Peruvian morwong (Cheilodactylus variegatus), the black snook (Centropomus nigrescens), the Californian needlefish (Strongylura exilis), chalapo clinid (Labrisomus philippii), fortune jack (Seriola peruana), and the grape-eye seabass (Hemilutjanus macrophthalmos).

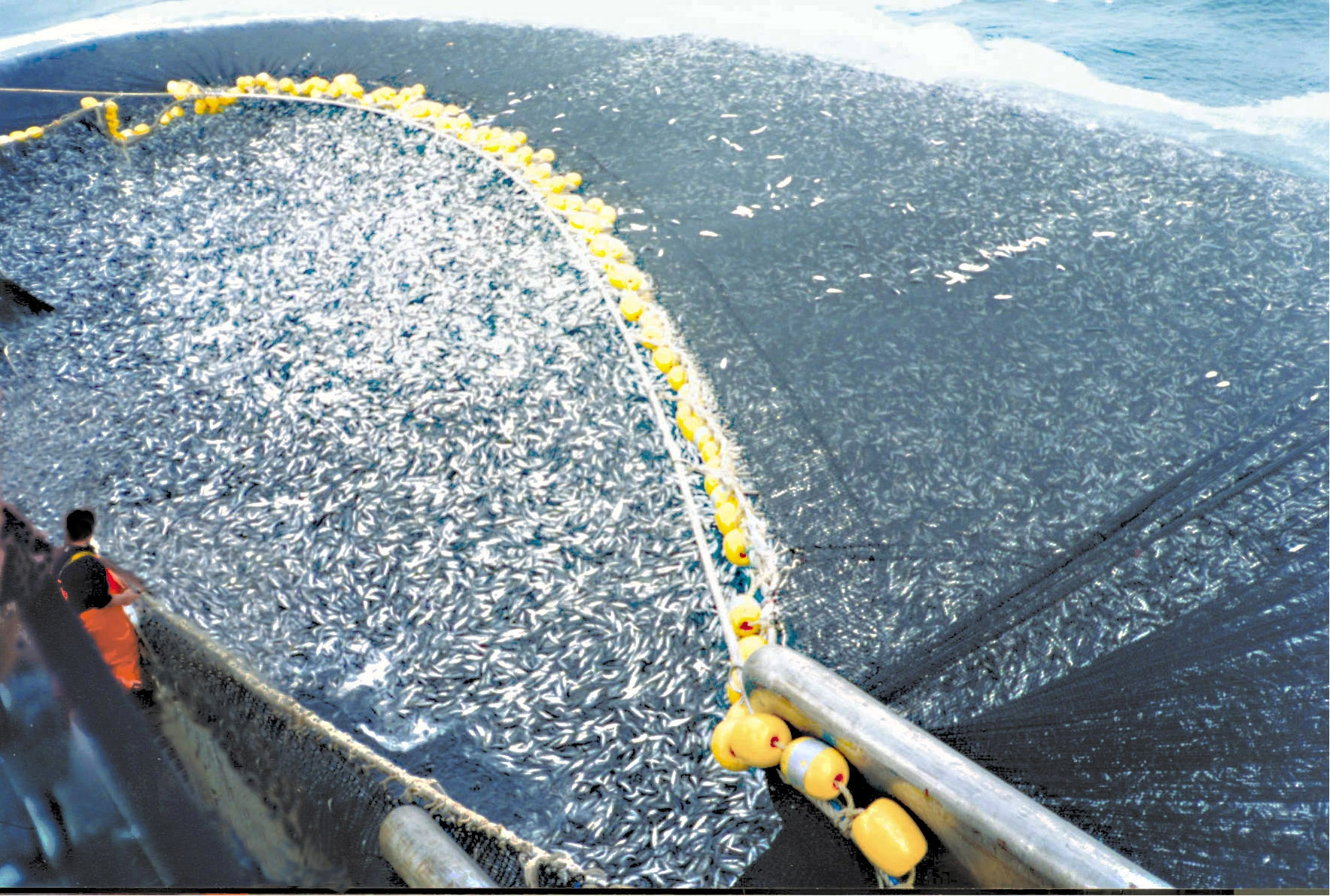
400 tons of Trachurus murphyi being caught by a Chilean purse seiner in Peru

Catch for the Pacific sardine was first recorded in 1973, with industrial fishing of the species commencing in 1978. The catch peaked at over 3,500,000 tonnes in 1988, however, catch slowly decreased until nearly no sardines were caught after 2001. The Chilean jack mackerel is a significantly caught fish in the Peruvian fishery, first recorded in 1951 at 100 tonnes and peaking in 2001 at over 720,000 tonnes; the catch in 2011 was over 250,000 tonnes. The Pacific chub mackerel is mainly caught by industrial ships (about 84%) and the rest is caught by small, artisanal ships. The Peruvian hake is an important species in the bottom trawl fishery, for both industrial and artisanal fishers. Commercial fishing of the species began in 1965 and has since remained a significant species, with over 78,000 tonnes fished in 2017, with exports generating US$29.3 million, mainly to Germany, the United States, and Eastern Europe. The total domestic value of frozen and fresh products in 2016 was estimated at US$55.9 million. 82,000 tonnes of Eastern Pacific bonito were caught in 2023 by artisanal fishers. Recorded catch for longnose anchovy is highly erratic, beginning in 1993 at 63,420 tonnes and peaking in 1998 at over 706,000 tonnes; 3,520 tonnes were caught in 2011. Catch for dolphinfish was first recorded in 1988 at 618 tonnes, and the highest recorded catch was in 2009 at over 57,000 tonnes. Capture of flathead grey mullet peaked in 2017 at nearly 32,000 tonnes; about 25,000 tonnes were caught in 2018. Catch of Pacific menhaden has been recorded since at least 1950, peaking at 44,700 tonnes in 1973; 2011 recorded over 1,700 tonnes captured. In Arequipa region, Chilean silverside catch was recorded to be about 184 tonnes in 2018. Capture of Peruvian rock seabass peaked in 1985 at 7,500 tonnes and over 3,000 tonnes were caught in 2018. Cabinza grunt catch has been recorded since at least 1950, peaking in 2002 at 5,606 tonnes; 2011 yielded over 3,600 tonnes. 3,269 tonnes of punctuated snake-eel were captured in 2023 in northern Peru. Catch for swordfish has been relatively small, caught since at least 1950 and having over 1,300 tonnes caught in Peru in 2011. The Peruvian moonfish is of little commercial value and only important to artisanal fisheries, where they market the fish in the Tumbes region; therefore, catch for the species is not well recorded. Catch for the Pacific sierra has been recorded since at least 1950, peaking in 1999 at over 2,700 tonnes, with the most recently recorded catch in 2011 at 325 tonnes. Catch for the Peruvian morwong was first recorded in 1966 and has consistently been small, almost always below 500 tonnes, except for in 2007 where it reached over 800 tonnes.

Recording for some teleost categories include multiple species, such as the following: Cusk-eels with the Pacific bearded brotula (Brotula clarkae) and the black cusk-eel (Genypterus maculatus), tilefish with the bighead tilefish (Caulolatilus affinis) and the Ocean whitefish (Caulolatilus princeps), drums and croakers with the corvina drum (Cilus gilberti), loran drum (Sciaena deliciosa), minor stardrum (Stellifer minor), Pacific drum (Larimus pacificus), Peruvian banded croaker (Paralonchurus peruanus), and the Peruvian weakfish (Cynoscion analis), tunas with the yellowfin tuna (Thunnus albacares) and the skipjack tuna (Katsuwonus pelamis), basses, groupers, and hinds of the Serranidae family, and several other uncategorized marine fishes.

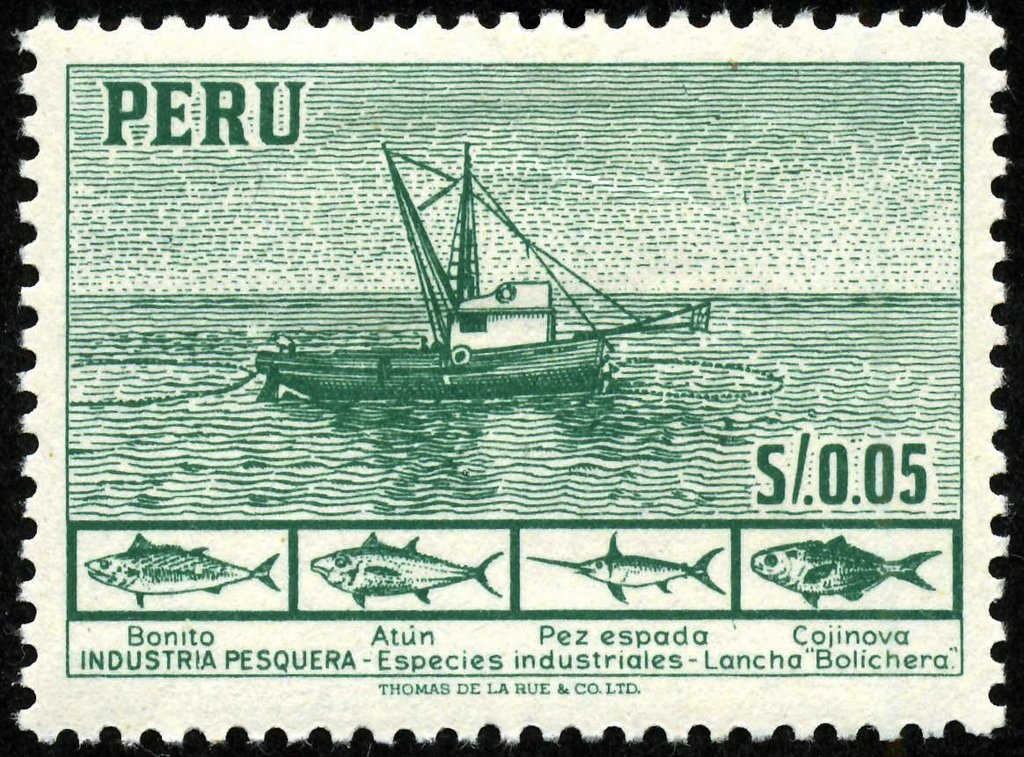
1952 stamp of Peru depicting several fish species, with a caption in Spanish, "FISHING INDUSTRY - Commercial species - Boat 'Bolichera'"

Catch for the corvina drum has been recorded since at least 1950, with catch peaking in 1960 at 17,900 tonnes; over 9,000 tonnes were caught in 2011. Catch for the Peruvian banded croaker has also been recorded since at least 1950 and peaked at over 24,500 tonnes in 1985; 1,200 tonnes were caught in 2011. Catch for the Peruvian weakfish has been recorded since 1961 and peaked in 1998 at 10,795 tonnes, with the most recent catch in 2011 at over 4,300 tonnes. Catch for the yellowfin tuna has been recorded since at least 1950 and peaked in 1998 at over 12,700 tonnes, with the most recent catch in 2011 at over 7,700 tonnes. Catch for the skipjack tuna has been recorded since at least 1950 and peaked at 26,700 tonnes in 1959, with the most recent catch in 2011 at over 4,100 tonnes.

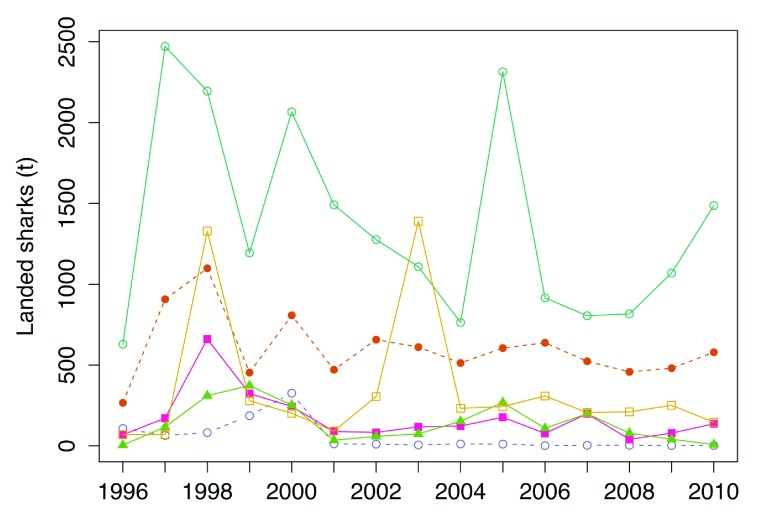
Shark landings in Peru: Green solid line-open circle = Blue Shark, Orange dashed line-closed circle = Mako Shark, Light purple dashed line-open circle = Angel Shark, Fucsia solid line-closed square = Smooth-Hound, Light green solid line-closed triangle = Common Thresher Shark, Yellow solid line-open square = Smooth Hammerhead Shark

Some sharks are commonly caught, including the blue shark, known scientifically as Prionace glauca, the shortfin mako, known scientifically as Isurus oxyrinchus, the smooth hammerhead, known scientifically as Sphyrna zygaena, the common thresher, known scientifically as Alopias vulpinus, the humpback smooth-hound, known scientifically as Mustelus whitneyi, the school shark, known scientifically as Galeorhinus galeus, the Pacific angelshark, known scientifically as Squatina californica, and other sharks of the Elasmobranchii subclass. From 1950 to 2010, about 372,000 tons of sharks were caught in Peru, with all listed, except the school shark, representing 94% of landings; blue shark represented 42%, shortfin mako represented 20%, smooth hammerhead represented 15%, humpback smooth-hound represented 7%, common thresher represented 6%, and the Pacific angelshark represented 4%. Fishing for these sharks increased between 1996 and 2010, then representing 98% of all shark landings. The year with the most landings was 1973 with 19,718 tons of sharks caught. The sharks are particularly fished for their fins, and Peru, along with Costa Rica and Ecuador, are important suppliers of shark fins to the Asian market.

Batoids commonly caught are the giant manta, scientifically known as Mobula birostris, along with other species from the Myliobatiformes order and some from the Rajiformes order, and the Pacific guitarfish, scientifically known as Pseudobatos planiceps. Overall, 202,422 tonnes of batoids were caught in Peru between 1950 and 2015, peaking in 1988 at 11,284 tonnes. Although giant mantas used to be largely caught by artisanal fishers in Peru, since 2013, capture, selling, and consumption of the species has been illegalized due to the decline of the species. Now, the species is mainly used for ecotourism. Estimations detail that a giant manta, through ecotourism, can generate over US$1,000,000 over its lifetime, as opposed to, at most, US$500 at death for its meat.

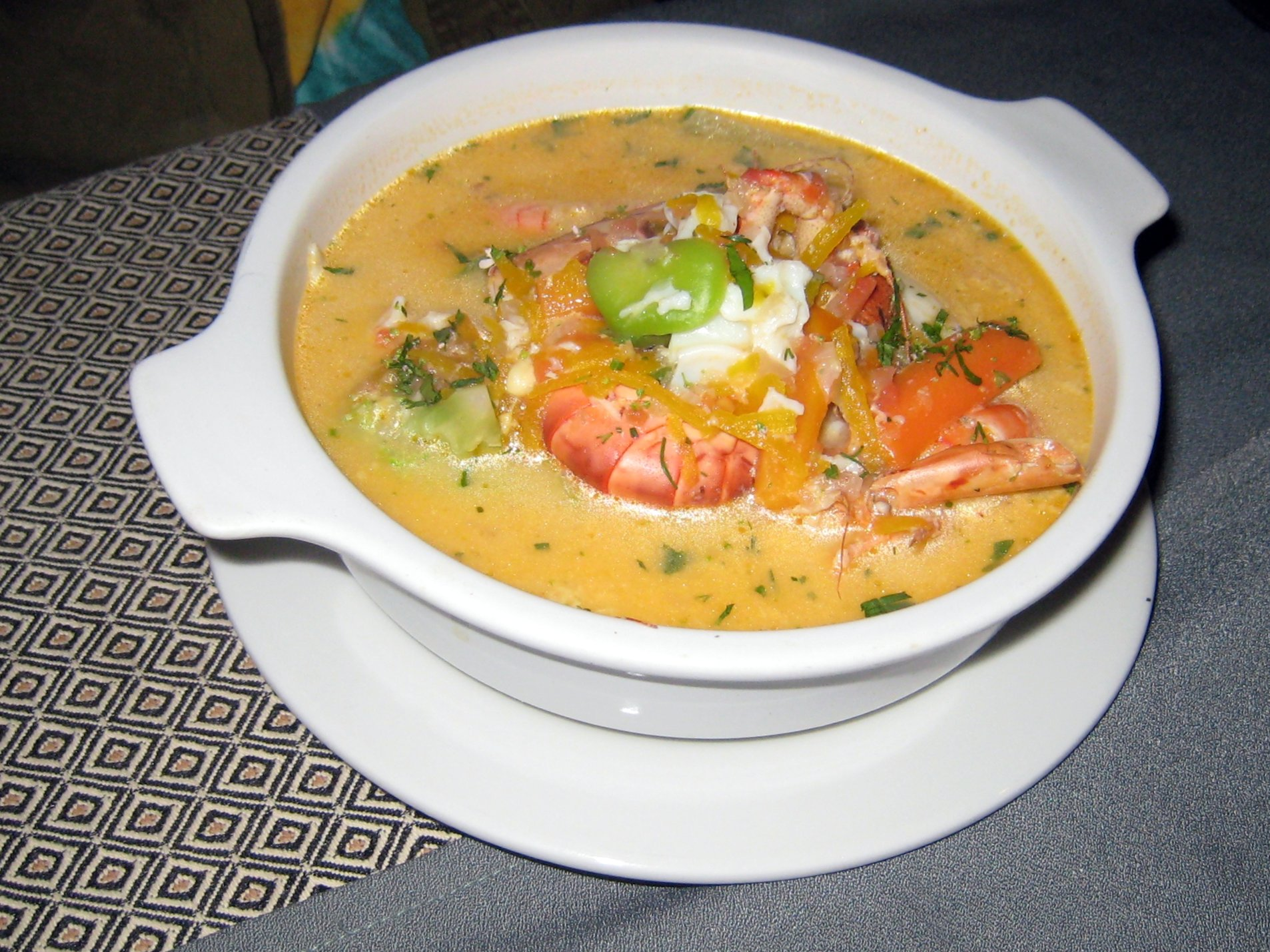
Chupe de camarones served in Peru

Crustaceans include the Panulirus gracilis, or the green spiny lobster, commonly fished by artisanal fishers using gillnets or their hands in the Tumbes region in the north of Peru. Catches for the species began first being recorded by the FAO in 1974. The largest catch recorded by the FAO was in 1998 when 669 tonnes were caught. Most of the catch goes to restaurants, local markets, hotels, and consumers for consumption. Marine crabs are also caught and typically used for direct human consumption. Penaeid shrimps are also caught, along with Pleuroncodes monodon, or the red squat lobster, which became abundant in the mid-1990s and are typically caught unintentionally as bycatch by industrial ships and used as bait by smaller, artisanal ships.

Bivalves that are commonly fished include the Chilean ribbed mussel, clams such as Gari solida and Semele corrugata, macha clam, Peruvian calico scallop, and some other bivalves. These other bivalves include razor clams, Venus clams, oysters, bean clams, mussels, Mexican cockles, and ark clams. All bivalves are typically caught by artisanal divers. The Chilean ribbed mussel, known scientifically as Aulacomya atra, is the most significant, making up nearly half of all shellfish landings. Catch for Aulacomya atra was first recorded in 1953, and the most were caught in 1976 at 16,385 tonnes; 2011 yielded over 9,100 tonnes. Catch for the Peruvian calico scallop, or Argopecten purpuratus, was first recorded in 1952, and in 2007 over 93,000 tonnes of the scallop were caught.

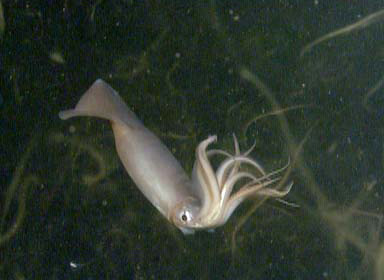
Underwater photo of a jumbo flying squid

Cephalopods include the Changos octopus, the jumbo flying squid, and the Patagonian squid. Catch for the Changos octopus, scientifically known as Octopus mimus, has constantly fluctuated, entering a large growth period from 2015 to 2017, reaching its height in 2017 when about 6,300 tonnes were caught. However, after 2017, catch significantly crashed to only an average of about 1,100 tonnes. The jumbo flying squid is the second-largest fishery in Peru and is also the largest artisanal fishery, involving over 11,000 fishers and over 3,000 fishing ships. It is also economically important, with 30% of the catch being exported to the US and Europe, generating over US$860 million per year. Catch for the jumbo flying squid, known scientifically as Dosidicus gigas, was first recorded in 1970. The 2000s saw a significant increase in the amount of jumbo flying squid caught, with the largest catch recorded in 2014 at over 556,000 tonnes; 2021 saw over 490,000 tonnes caught. Catch for the Patagonian squid, known scientifically as Doryteuthis gahi and formerly as Loligo gahi, was first recorded in 1963, and the highest catch was recorded in 2003 at over 27,000 tonnes; 2011 yielded only about 2,200 tonnes. Patagonian squid are mainly caught using small-scale fishing gear and are primarily used for direct human consumption.

Gastropods commonly caught are the chocolate rock shell, swollen frog shell, concave ear moon snail, Chilean abalone, and limpets of the Fissurella genus. Between 1970 and 1992, the catch for the chocolate rock shell, known scientifically as Thaisella chocolata, was recorded as 'caracol' under the mollusk category by IMARPE; The highest recorded catch was in 1989 with over 7,300 tonnes caught. It is typically caught by artisanal divers and eaten fresh by locals or exported frozen. The Chilean abalone, known scientifically as Concolepas concholepas, has had its catch recorded since 1990, peaking in that same year at over 7,700 tonnes; about 1,200 tonnes were captured in 2011.

The main echinoderm caught is the Chilean sea urchin, known as Loxechinus albus; however, sea cucumbers, known scientifically as Holothuroidea, are also caught. Catch for the Chilean sea urchin first began in 1969, and the highest catch was recorded in 2019 at 4,350 tonnes. Some sea cucumber species commercially caught are Holothuria theelii, Isostichopus fuscus, Athyonidium chilensis, and Pattalus mollis. The sea cucumber fishery started in the late 1980s, focusing on Holothuria theelii, but when this species depleted, the fishery shifted to Pattalus mollis, which remains the focus in present day, and onto other species. Athyonidium chilensis originally was only eaten in the Department of Lambayeque, but along with Pattalus mollis, they are now available on local markets. Typically, sea cucumbers are caught as bycatch and used for subsistence and as an 'artisanal venture'. Sea cucumbers are not officially managed by the Peruvian government. Much of the catch goes to Hong Kong, with 26.1% of all sea cucumbers imported from Peru. A total of 79,349 kilograms of sea cucumbers have been imported by Hong Kong from Peru between 1996 and 2005.

=== Freshwater life ===
Freshwater life is also fished in Peru, although at a smaller scale. Species living in coastal rivers are almost never fished commercially and are mostly fished by artisanal fishers living near the rivers. Some examples of fish caught in coastal rivers include Brycon atrocaudatus and Chaetostoma microps, which are caught in the Tumbes River, and catfishes of the Astroblepus and Trichomycterus genus, typically caught in the Jequetepeque River.

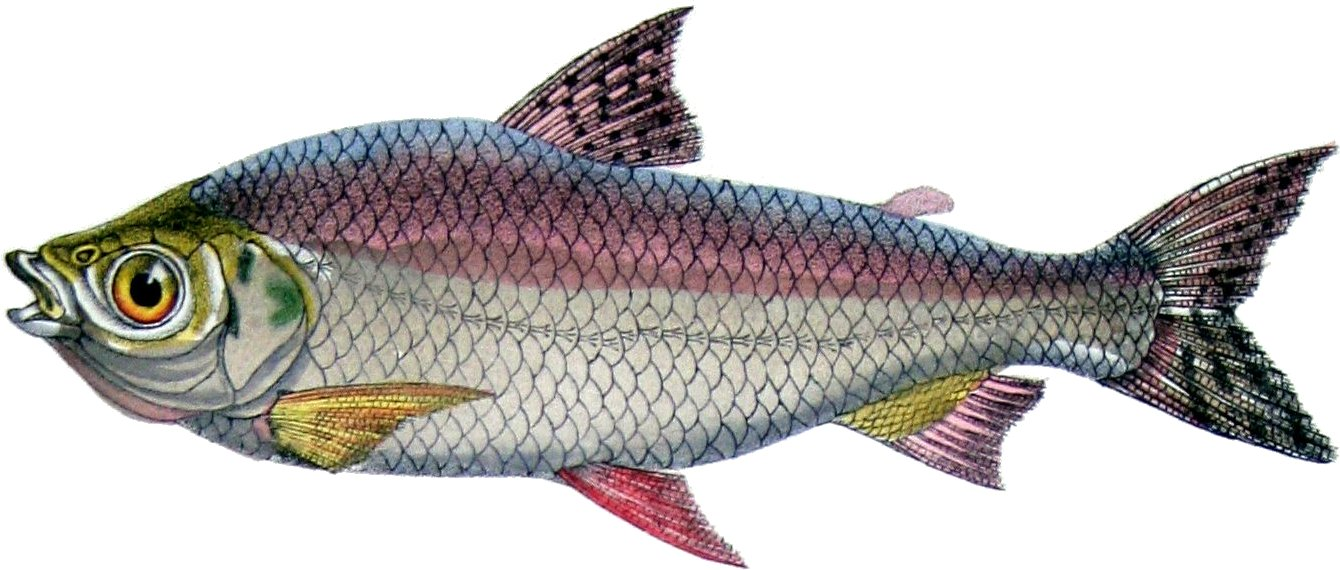
Prochilodus nigricans

In highland waterbodies, the main species fished is the rainbow trout. In higher forest streams, most fishing is done for local direct human consumption. These rivers include the Perene River, Satipo River, Huallaga River, Aguaytia River, and the Alto Urubamba River. Small species, such as those of the Rhamdia genus, are mainly targeted, but larger fish such as Pseudoplatystoma fasciatum and Prochilodus nigricans are also fished. P. nigricans is said to be the most commercially important species, making up about 30% of the annual catch. Colossoma macropomum and P. brachypomus are also important when seasonally available.

Commercial fishing for freshwater fish mainly occurs in the rivers of large cities. Such areas include Puerto Maldonado, located along the Tambopata and Madre de Dios River; Pucallpa, along the Ucayali River; and Iquitos, which includes the Ucayali River and Marañón River. 50 different species of fish are caught in the Madre de Dios River, although only 12 species make up 90% of the catch. These species include Pseudoplatystoma fasciatum and tigrinum, Brachyplatystoma rouseauxii and filamentosum, Phractocephalus hemioliopterus, Zungaro zungaro, Piaractus brachypomus, Prochilodus nigricans, Mylossoma duriventre, and Potamorhina altamazonica. In Pucallpa, from 1980 to 1991, about 3,800 tonnes on average were caught annually, and 8 species made up 85% of the landings. In Iquitos, 10 species accounted for about 90% of the catch.

In the Amazonia area, approximately 70 species are caught commercially for direct human consumption. 420 other species are used for ornamental purposes. About 80,000 tonnes of fish are caught in the Peruvian Amazonia, as of 2008, with 75% caught by artisanal fishers and the other 25% caught by commercial fishers. Iquitos caught 30,000 tonnes, Pucallpa caught 12,000 tonnes, and Tambopata caught 290 tonnes.

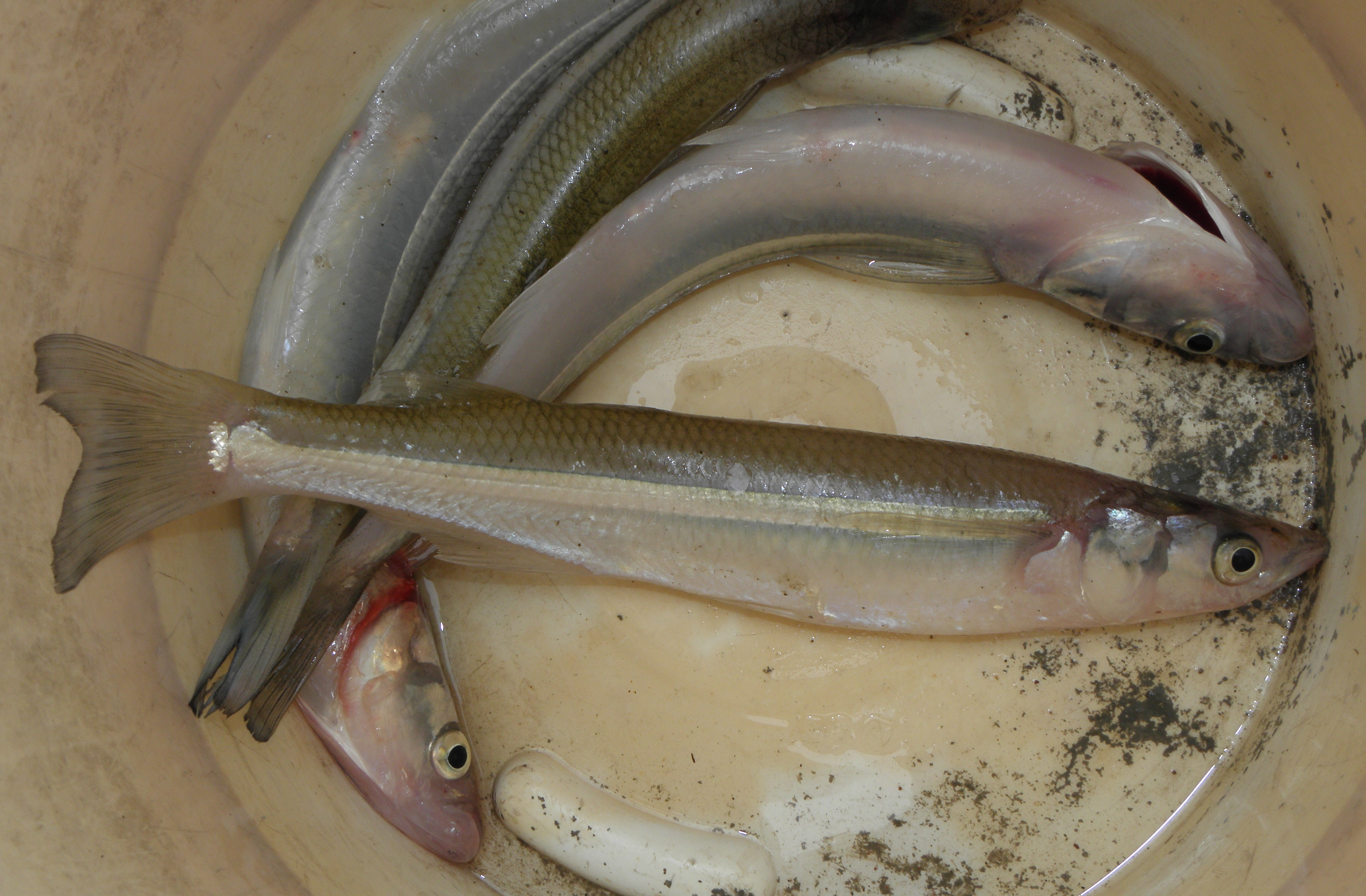
Argentinian silverside in a bucket

Lake Titicaca experiences some commercial fishing, mainly on the rainbow trout, introduced in the 1930s, and the Argentinian silverside, introduced in the 1950s. The fish are sold in restaurants near Lake Titicaca. Other fishes caught in Lake Titicaca are also sold to Cusco, Puno, and La Paz.

Some other species that are also commonly fished include Arapaima gigas, which is important commercially and for those living in the Amazon, as it provides a source of food and income. However, fishing for the species is permanently banned in certain areas and during reproductive periods in other areas due to overfishing, which nearly wiped out the species. Aquaculture has also sought to continue harvesting the species sustainably. Shrimp, such as Cryphiops caementarius, are also fished in the south and center rivers of Peru. The species is unique, as it is the only one that lives in rivers that supports, not only the artisanal fishery, but also the commercial fishery, mainly in the Majes-Camaná River.

== Aquaculture ==
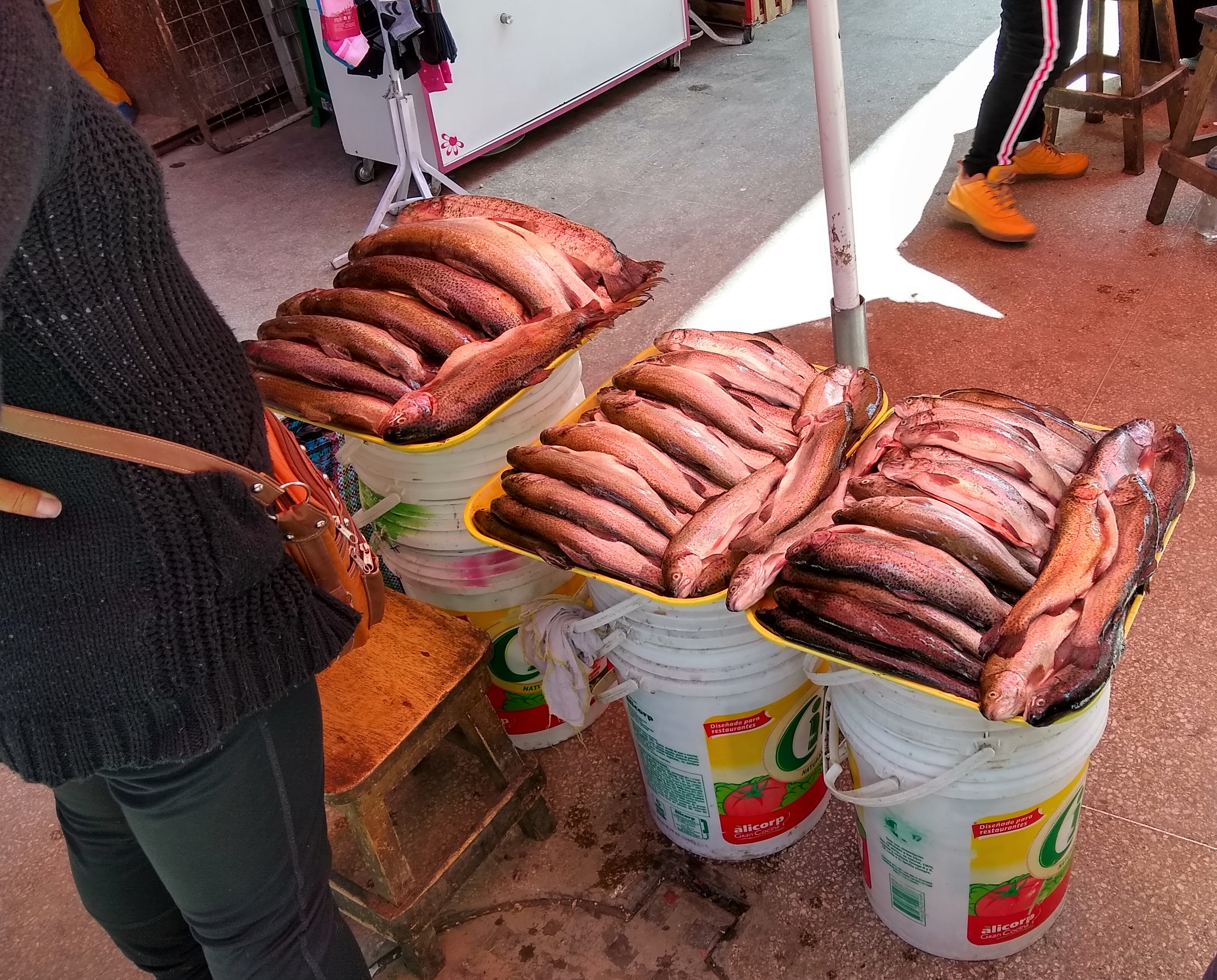
Person in Huancayo selling rainbow trout.

Aquaculture began in 1934 following the introduction of rainbow trout for sports fishing, which became the first freshwater fish to be cultivated in Peru. Since then, several other species of aquatic life have been produced in the aquaculture sector of the fishing industry, a rapidly developing economic activity within Peru run by both commercial and artisanal operations in both ocean and inland areas. In 2003, aquaculture produced about 13,300 tonnes. In 2010, Peru produced about 89,000 tonnes of aquaculture products. In 2021, aquaculture production in Peru was about 150,000 tonnes. In 2023, aquaculture production dropped to about 105,000 tonnes, about 25.4% less than in 2022, which was about 141,000 tonnes.

In 2023, aquaculture accounted for about US$359.9 million from exporting about 58,000 tonnes of product.

=== Maritime aquaculture ===
Maritime aquaculture consists of a few species; however, the two animals mainly cultivated that account for most of the harvest are scallops and penaeid shrimps/prawns. Specifically, Agropecten purpuratus and Litopenaeus vannamei are the most harvested. In 2005, shrimp exports were US$35.4 million, and scallop exports were US$28.7 million; by 2014, shrimp exports grew to US$162.6 million, and scallop exports grew to US$132.9 million. In 2023, shrimp/prawn exports were about US$262.8 million, and scallop exports dropped significantly to US$61.4 million.

During the 1970s, penaeid shrimp were introduced in northern Peru, although production diminished significantly in 1998 following an outbreak of white spot syndrome. Shrimp culture is abundant along the coasts, especially in the region of Tumbes and Piura. Scallop culture is most prominent in Ancash and Lima. In 2003, of about 10,000 tonnes produced by maritime aquaculture, about 7,300 tonnes and 2,700 tonnes came from scallops and shrimp, respectively. In 2023, about 58,300 tonnes of product were produced by maritime aquaculture, of which about 15,400 tonnes and 42,900 tonnes of scallops and shrimp were produced, respectively.

=== Inland aquaculture ===
Inland aquaculture consists of a greater variety of species compared to maritime aquaculture; however, the two fishes that are most commonly cultivated are trout and tilapia, who accounted for about 97% of the harvest in 2013. In 2003, about 3,300 tonnes of product were produced by inland aquaculture, of which 3,000 tonnes were from trout and 120 tonnes were from tilapia. In 2023, about 46,800 tonnes of product were produced by inland aquaculture, of which about 39,900 tonnes of trout were harvested, and about 2,800 tonnes of tilapia were harvested. Since about 2015, 'paco' (Piaractus brachypomus) has grown significantly in scale, from about 38 tonnes in 2003 to 1,400 tonnes in 2016 and about 3,000 tonnes in 2023.

Production of other inland species in tonnes
Species/Year	2003	2014	2015	2016	2017	2018	2019	2020	2021	2022	2023
Netted prochilod (Boquichico)	7	6	9	31	58	29	6	48	259	136	182
Giant Malaysian prawn	7	78	21	34	26	29	27	27	25	25	22
Carp	5	2	4	4	5	4	0	-	-	0	-
Gamitana/Cachama	86	504	299	1,863	1,047	952	787	881	852	844	573
'Pacotana' (Hybrid of Piaractus brachypomus and Colossoma macropomum)	6	9	219	11	35	14	-	-	2	-	-
Streaked prochilod (Sábalo)	9	37	33	87	84	113	148	494	420	309	145
Paiche	N/A	55	135	142	218	295	86	99	81	85	151

== Economic contribution ==
=== GDP contribution ===
The fishing industry is a major industry within Peru. In 2007, the sector accounted for a record 1.7% of the country's total GDP, although declined to about 0.9% of the GDP in 2013, remaining however a major industry. Exports accounted for about US$2.8 billion in 2013. Exports were estimated to be about US$2.7 billion in 2017. In 2020, the sector accounted for about 1.5% of Peru's GDP, and represented 7% of the total exports of Peru, at about US$3.3 billion. In 2023, the sector exported about US$2.9 billion in products.

Exports in US$ (millions) of fishery products
	2014	2015	2016	2017	2018	2019	2020	2021	2022	2023
Total	2,915	2,385	2,188	2,874	3,306	3,526	2,862	3,860	4,090	2,914
Aquaculture	288.7	233.3	230.1	297.2	328.8	361.4	338.6	420.7	429.1	359.8

=== Employment ===
In 1999, employment stood at about 121,629 workers, according to the Food and Agriculture Organization, and in 2007, the FAO estimated there to be about 145,232 workers, with about 58% working to capture and extract, about 19% working to process, about 6% working in aquaculture, and the remaining 16% working in related activities. In 2013, employment is said to have been around 160,000 workers, with about 59% working to capture and extract, about 16% working to process, about 9% working in aquaculture, and the remaining 17% working in related activities. In total, this would account for about 1% of Peru's workforce; however, some sources claim that the fishing sector generated as many as 231,000 to 232,000 jobs in 2013, with the retailer section accounting for about 45% of the jobs, the primary sector accounting for about 32%, and the processing sector accounting for the remaining 20%. By far, restaurants accounted for the most employment. In the primary sector, mainly men worked; in the processing sector, both men and women shared half-and-half of the employment; in the retail sector, women shared a small majority. As a whole, men mostly dominate employment in the fishery industry. In 2021, The Economist stated that the fishing industry in Peru supported as many as 700,000 jobs. In the maritime, inland, and aquaculture industries, there are about 58,700, 23,000, and about 9,200 employed, respectively, totaling about 90,900 employed in 2023.

== Environmental concerns ==
=== Overfishing ===
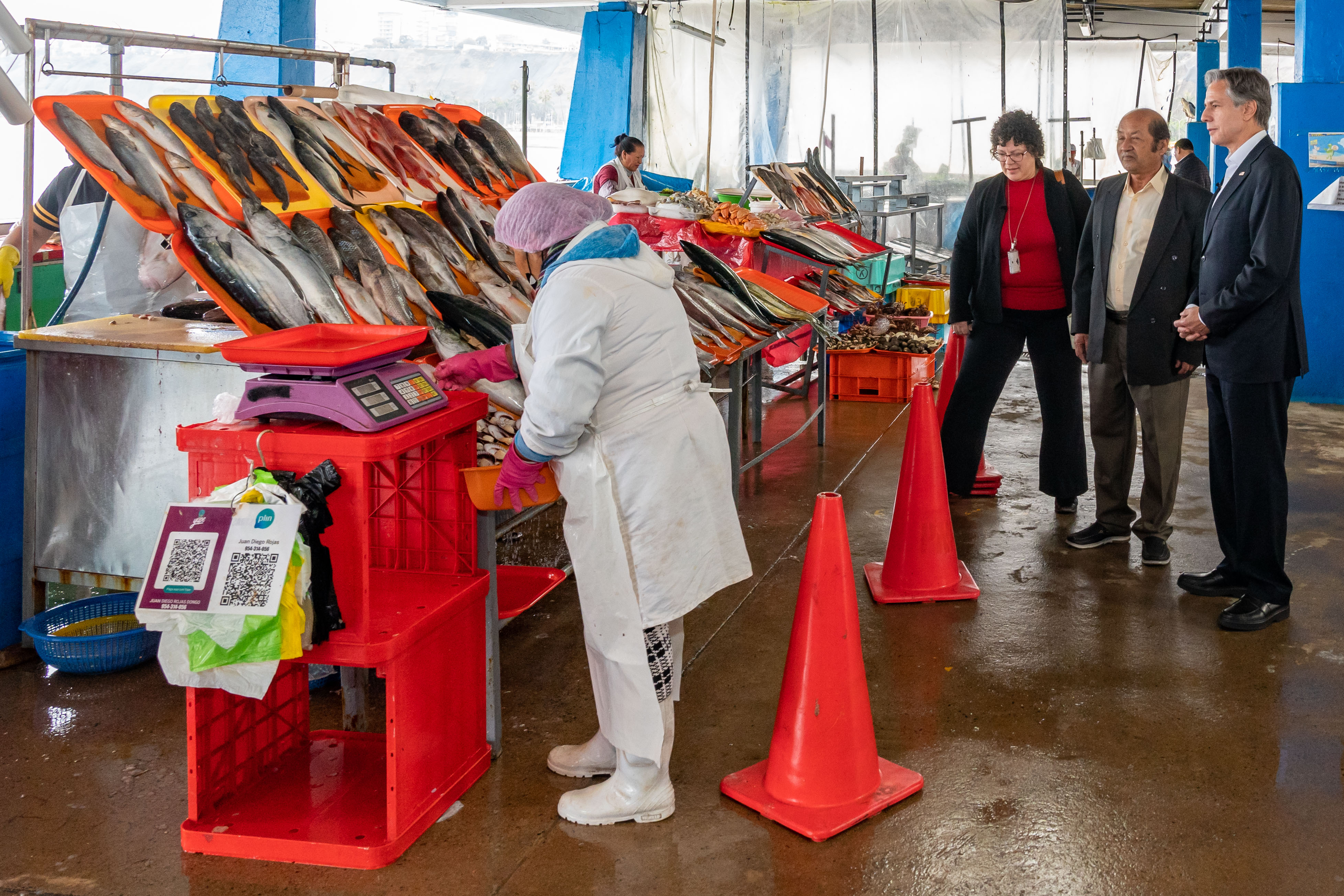
Then American Secretary of State Antony Blinken participating in a Sustainable Fishing Engagement at the Chorrillos Fish Market

Overfishing has been an issue in Peru concerning the fishing industry since at least the 1960s. This especially applies to the Peruvian anchoveta. In the 1960s, there were indications that overfishing was occurring, which the government attempted to control in 1965 by limiting the annual catch to 7 million tons; however, these limits were ineffective. Later in 1972, the Peruvian anchoveta crisis demonstrated the effects of this overfishing, which made the anchovies less resilient and, coupled with the El Niño, caused the fish to be unable to survive the warmer waters and diminished food supply available to consume.

Overfishing remains an issue in modern times, presenting in multiple ways. Illegal, unreported, and unregulated fishing, in particular by Chinese vessels, continues to be combated by Peruvian authorities. Illegal fishing threatens marine ecosystems and fishery resources, as well as negatively impacts the local Peruvian economy. In 2020, foreign vessels were required to use satellite devices to monitor activities by those vessels, and while the restriction was eased since May 2023, continual violations led to new laws being announced in July 2024 to control these vessels.

=== Pollution ===
Pollution has posed an issue in recent years for multiple reasons. Plastic pollution can impact artisanal fishers, as it can tangle propellers and clog water pumps, leading to economic losses, about US$8.3 million worth estimated during a study conducted from 2021 to 2022. Oil spills, such as the 2022 Callao oil spill, can impact fishers who fish near the coast, as it halts fishing due to the oil in the water.

Additionally, the fishing industry contributes to pollution. Abandoned, lost, or discarded fishing gear (ALDFG) may tangle or otherwise negatively affect marine life. During an observer program from 2003 to 2023, of 8,742 analyzed fishing sets, about 817 incidents of loss occurred, with bottom longlines reporting the most incidents. In 2018, between 2,715 and 5,584 tonnes of plastic entered Peru's EEZ, of which ALDFG contributed to between 56% and 96% of this pollution. Antifouling paint used on the Peruvian fleet can also be a source of microplastic pollution, and 6% of about 193 tonnes of these plastic polymers found on the fleet may be emitted into the ocean.

=== Invasive species ===
Invasive species have impacted both inland and marine waters, sometimes as a result of the fishing industry. The introduction of rainbow trout in the 1930s to Lake Titicaca, along with Argentinian silverside in the 1950s, for economic purposes has displaced local native species such as Orestias, or killifish, and Trichomycterus, a native type of catfish. In 2010, Caulerpa filiormis was discovered in Paracas National Reserve in southern Peru, hypothesized to be from the movement of the scallop Argopecten purpuratus for the maritime aquaculture sector.

=== Climate change ===
Climate change poses a major threat to the Peruvian fishing industry, which includes both the industrial and artisanal sector. Longer, more intense El Niño events related to marine heatwaves reduce anchoveta landings. Warmer waters hold less oxygen, and smaller fish are able to live better in such environments. As a result, it is possible that Peruvian anchoveta, the main fish of the commercial fishery, may become smaller, making them harder to catch. Overall, this impacts both the fisheries and fishes, like mackerel, who feed on anchoveta, as this would raise prices due to increased scarcity of anchoveta and other fishes.

== Related organizations and projects ==
=== Ministry of Production ===
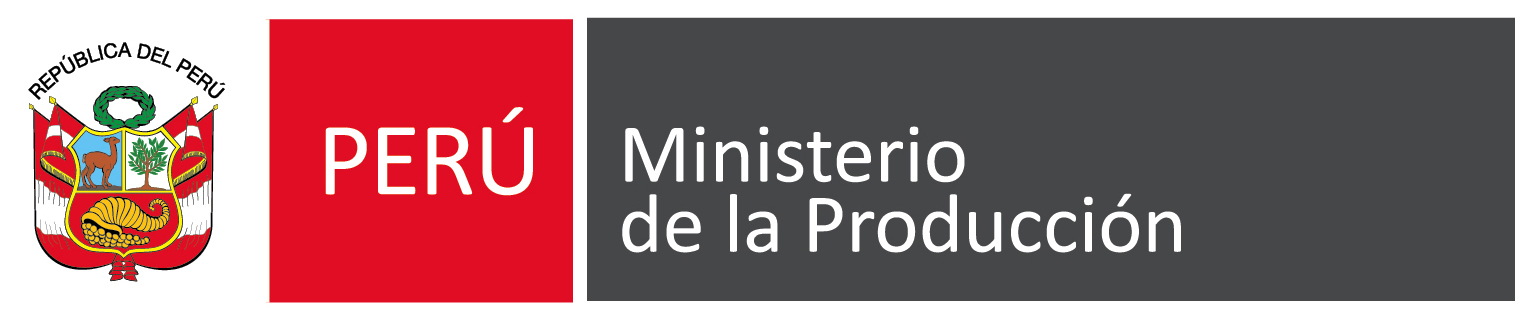
Logo of the Ministry of Production of Peru

The Ministerio de la Producción (English: Ministry of Production of Peru), known as PRODUCE, is the entity of the Peruvian executive branch responsible for formulating, executing, and supervising the policies of the fishery industry, aquaculture industry, MSEs, and other industries.

==== IMARPE ====
The Instituto del Mar del Perú (English: Marine Institute of Peru), known as IMARPE, is a specialized technical agency within the Ministry of Production that conducts research on the marine resources of Peru to act as an advisor for the state on policy regarding the use of those resources.

==== Organismo Nacional de Sanidad Pesquera ====
The Organismo Nacional de Sanidad Pesquera (English: National Fisheries Health Organization), known as SANIPES, is a specialized technical agency within the Ministry of Production that investigates, regulates, and supervises the production chain in the fishing and aquaculture industry to ensure public safety and health.

==== Fondo Nacional de Desarrollo Pesquero ====
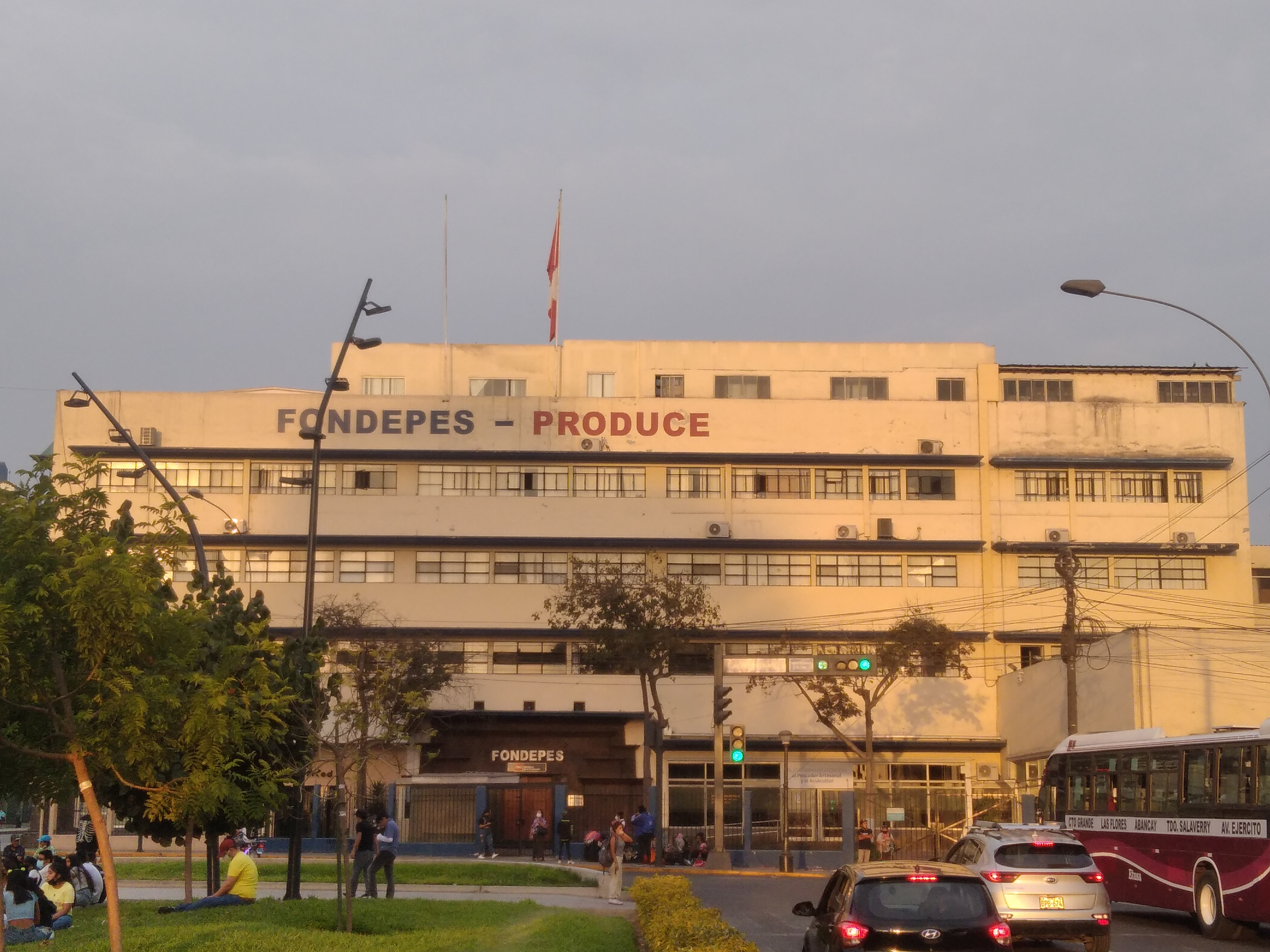
Front of the FONDEPES building

The Fondo Nacional de Desarrollo Pesquero (English translation: National Fund for Fisheries Development), known as FONDEPES, is a public executing agency within the Ministry of Production that helps to develop artisanal fishing and aquaculture nationwide to improve the industries in a sustainable manner.

=== Por la Pesca ===
Por la Pesca (English: For Fisheries) is a project created in 2022 as a joint effort to combat illegal, unreported, and unregulated fishing. It was created as a public-private partnership between the Walton Family Foundation and USAID, with the Sociedad Peruana de Derecho Ambiental leading the operation, along with its alliances, including REDES - Fishing Sustainability, Pro Delphinus, the Environmental Defense Fund, Future of Fish, the Sustainable Fisheries Partnership, The Nature Conservancy Peru, the World Wildlife Fund, and WildAid, along with several fishermen's associations. WFF contributed about US$12.5 million, with USAID initially providing US$5.7 million. The organization was set to operate in Peru and Ecuador and was aiming to reduce IUU fishing by at least 30% over the next five years.

=== Instituto Humboldt ===
The Instituto Humboldt, or the Instituto de Investigación de Recursos Biológicos Alexander von Humboldt (English: Alexander von Humboldt Biological Resources Research Institute), is a research institute within the Executive Branch of Colombia that conducts research on the biological diversity of Colombia.

=== Sociedad Peruana de Derecho Ambiental ===
The Sociedad Peruana de Derecho Ambiental (English: Peruvian Society for Environmental Law) is a non-profit established in 1986 that works to promote environmental policies in Peru.

=== Future of Fish ===
Future of Fish is a non-profit organization with the goal of ending overfishing. In October 2024, they announced a program, the Artisanal Fisher Development Fund, to support artisanal fishers and allow them to more easily access credits. By requiring participants to meet regulatory and business standards, it aims to increase sustainable practices and reduce environmental impact and costs. It also can help reduce IUU fishing by allowing artisanal fishers to transition to legal fishing.

=== Pro Delphinus ===
Pro Delphinus is a not-for-profit organization founded in 1995 in Peru dedicated to conserving endangered marine animals. They have worked with the World Wildlife Fund before to promote scientific research for the conservation of river dolphins and manatees and have conducted other projects before aimed at conservation.

=== SPRFMO ===
The South Pacific Regional Fisheries Management Organisation, commonly abbreviated as SPRFMO, is an inter-governmental organization that aims at long-term conservation and sustainability of fishery resources in the southern Pacific Ocean.

== See also ==
- Economy of Peru
- Geography of Peru
