= 1972 Peruvian anchoveta crisis =

Fishery collapse in Peru

During the 1972 fishing season, Peruvian fisheries who largely depended on catching Peruvian anchovetas, a species of anchovy, faced a crisis in which the previously abundant population of anchovetas began to heavily deplete as a result of overfishing from previous seasons and as a result of that year's strong El Niño current. The 1972 catch was significantly smaller than the previous couple years, and the years that followed continued to be significantly smaller than the 1970 and 1971 catches. This resulted in a major collapse of the fishing industry in Peru during the 1970s, causing a great impact on the Peruvian economy and in worldwide availability of fish meal and protein-high feedstocks.

== Industry development prior ==
During the 1940s, World War II led to the need and demand for food resources, and with Peru seen as a potential seafood source, developments began to occur in the fishing industry. In 1941, a request by the Peruvian government for a study on fisheries was made and a mission was directed by the United States Fish and Wildlife Service. Fishers were recorded around the coast making money by selling fish to coastal towns. Later in 1943, the Peruvian government established the Department of Fisheries under the guidance of the Secretary of Agriculture to overview the fishing industry. Gremios (guilds in English) began to form as well, ranging from a dozen to over thousands of members. Californian companies that began to shut down when operations became too costly to continue began selling their equipment in 1947 to Peruvian companies, effectively creating the fish meal industry in Peru.

The 1950s were largely dominated by fish meal production as it became the most profitable by-product of the industry and demand worldwide rose for food meal as food for livestock; Fishing technology also greatly improved. For example, the introduction of nylon nets in 1956, which helped lower long-term costs and attract many investors. During the 1960s, the industry continued to grow greatly, increasing to 12 million tons of anchovies. In 1970, 12.4 million tons of anchovies were caught, creating a world record; the catch was more than all of Western Europe and double that of North America. Peru had become the world's largest fishmeal producer. By 1970, an average 42%, as high as 47%, of the capital in the industry was owned mostly by North American corporations. The biggest group was Banchero Rossi, owned by Luis Banchero Rossi, responsible for about 17% of the total fish meal production in the industry. 1971 yielded another 10.3 million tons, slightly less than last year but still a huge amount; Financial investments appeared to be paying off.

== Crisis ==
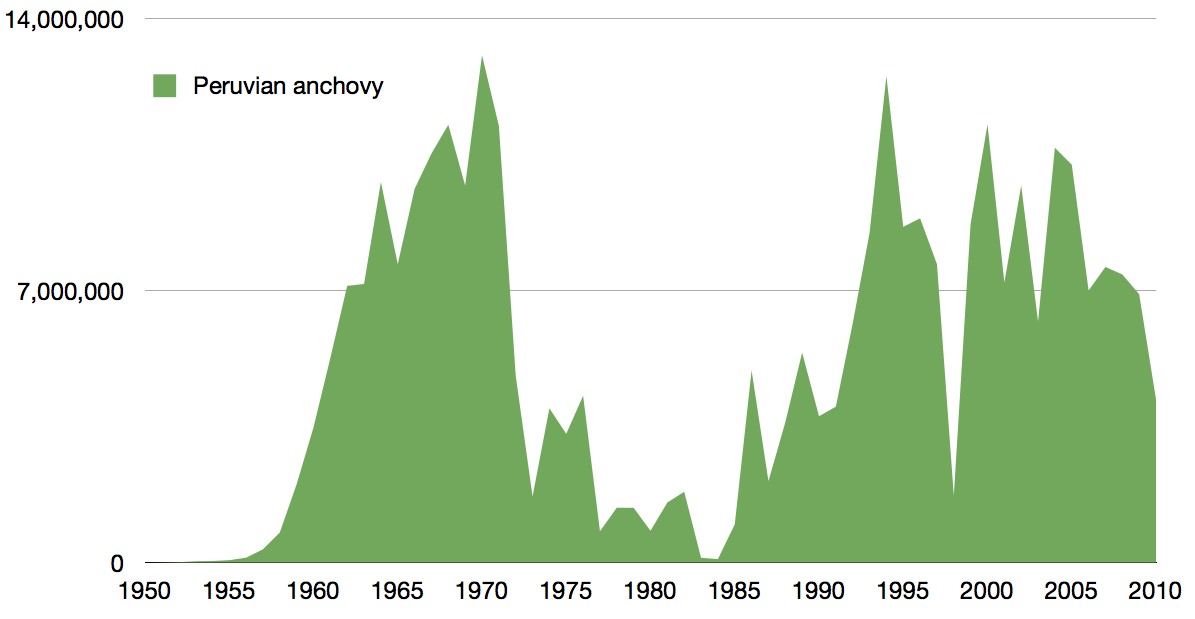
Global capture of Peruvian anchoveta. Displayed is the drastic crash in 1972.

The 1972 season was expected at first to be as grand as the previous years had been. However, in spring of 1972, an El Niño event started, with some estimates of its beginning ranging from February to April. The Peruvian anchovetas began to disappear and die out, and the fishers were bringing in less and less fish. The first two months of the 1972 were regarded as a closed season, and by May, nearly three quarters of all the fishing boats were returning with little to no catch. In June, the C.I.A reported that the catch was only 10% of what it was normally. By September 1972, the Ministry of Fisheries (established earlier in 1968 by the military dictatorship, led by Javier Tentaleán Vanini) declared that the fish meal industry was facing the worst crisis it had ever faced. The season closed with only a catch of 4.4 million tons, significantly less than the two previous catches in 1970 and 1971. Initially, although the year was considered a failure in the catch, fish meal exports remained mostly unaffected in 1972, as stock from last year was still able to be used, with estimated possible earnings of about $270 million from exports. Although the fish meal exports lagged behind the current event and still remained relatively high, the poor catch in 1972 still meant that new fish meal production was affected heavily, crashing to 897,000 tons.

== Effects ==
=== In Peru ===
The collapse of the fishing industry caused immense negative effects on the Peruvian economy. Loans were provided to the industry by the Peruvian government to keep the industry afloat, however, the worsening of the situation led to these loans becoming difficult to be repaid, leading to debt, which in turn negatively affected the national economy. In May 1973, the fishmeal industry, composed of 85 companies, was nationalized and expropriated by the Peruvian government, and a state-owned corporation, Pesca Peru, was established to take over production and assets that had been previously privately owned. This came as a result of the large debt, over $200 million, that the companies had accumulated to the state banks.

Unemployment in the industry also largely rose after the crisis, while artisanal fishing work also rose, as fishermen turned to fresh fish that could be used for human consumption. In 1967, about 22.4k fishermen were employed in the anchovy industry, but by 1972, only about 19.1k were employed; the number of fishers who fished for food rose from about 13.2k in 1967 to 26.6k in 1972. This high unemployment also led to the worsening of the standard of living for the fishermen, who were a part of the working class. As a result, militant uprisings, protests, and strikes arose, most prominently in Chimbote in 1973, largely referred to as the 'Chimbotazo'.

The guano industry in Peru was also largely affected by the collapse. Because the anchovetas were the birds' main food source, when the anchovetas disappeared and died, the birds also began to die or began to move to other places due to lack of food. When this occurred, this meant less excrement was being produced, so the harvest for the guano industry decreased as well, and this meant less fertilizer for Peruvian farmers. In the 1950s, the population for the guano birds was about 45 million and the guano harvest was about 330,000 tons, however, by 1970, the populations was only about 6 million and the harvest crashed significantly, to about 50,000 tons.

=== Worldwide ===
In the years following the crisis, the prices of fishmeal, as well as fish oil, rapidly increased. Throughout the 1960s, the price stayed relatively stable, at around $100 USD/ton for fishmeal, and $70 to $171 USD/ton for fish oil. However, beginning in 1973, the prices skyrocketed to over double their original prices. The price of fishmeal in 1973 was $385 USD/ton and the price of fish oil was $278 USD/ton. The prices of fishmeal continued to remain extremely high during the 1970s and early 1980s, peaking at $451 USD/ton in 1981. The prices of fish oil remained volatile and high throughout the 1970s, although decreased to pre-crisis prices by 1981, peaking at $706 USD/ton in 1977.

As a result of the skyrocketed prices and the low supply, people began to turn to other sources of protein to feed livestock. In particular, soybean meal was the alternative that most turned to as a replacement. As a result, the prices of soybean meal also skyrocketed because of increased demand, and the possibility of a worldwide crisis had to be eased through an American embargo and through Japanese investments into South American soybean fields. The failure of the catch also intensified the effects of the "Great Grain Robbery", because the lack of grain and oilseed led to increased demand for alternatives, especially for protein sources, but then that demand was all pushed to soybean meal after the anchovy catch failed. Meat prices also increased as a result of the fishmeal and soybean meal shortages.

== Causes ==
When the crisis first occurred, the 1972–1973 El Niño event was largely blamed for causing the crash of the anchoveta population, which in turn caused the smaller catch in 1972. However, although it did play a part in causing the crash of the population, recent times and research have found that overfishing was also a large cause of the crisis. Before the collapse, the fishing quota of about 9.5 million tons set by both the Peruvian government and recommended by scientists was largely ignored and exceeded by millions of tons. This continually weakened and diminished the anchoveta populations, which caused the fish to be less able to survive when ocean conditions warmed due to the El Niño. The warm waters meant less available food for the anchovetas, so they began to die out from starvation, crashing the population, and in turn, causing the fishery to yield less anchovetas.

The heavy reliance on the fishing industry has also been pointed to as an issue which contributed directly to how intense the effects of the collapse were on the Peruvian economy. By 1968, the economy of Peru and its stability was so dependent on the fishing industry that the nation's future practically depended on the industry and its continued growth. By 1970, about a third of Peru's export earnings were from fish products such as fishmeal and fish oil.

== See also ==
- Collapse of the Atlantic northwest cod fishery
- Overfishing
