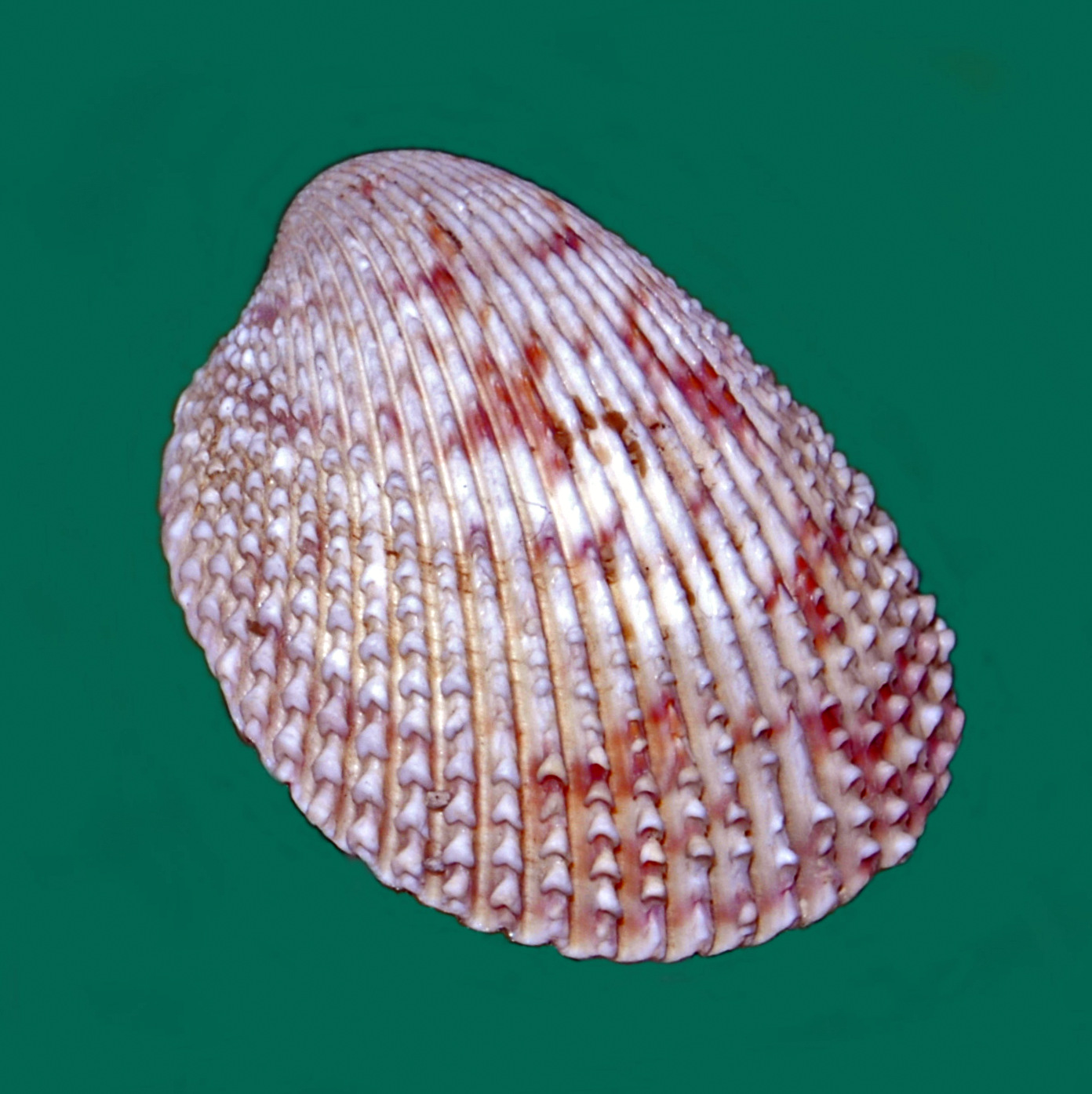
- A view of a valve of Trachycardium egmontianum

Conservation status
- Secure (NatureServe)

Scientific classification
- Kingdom: Animalia
- Phylum: Mollusca
- Class: Bivalvia
- Order: Cardiida
- Family: Cardiidae
- Genus: Trachycardium
- Species: T. egmontianum

Binomial name
- Trachycardium egmontianum (Shuttleworth, 1856)

Synonyms
- Cardium egmontianum Shuttleworth, 1856

= Trachycardium egmontianum =

Species of bivalve

Trachycardium egmontianum, the Florida prickly cockle, is a species of bivalve mollusc in the family Cardiidae.

== Description ==
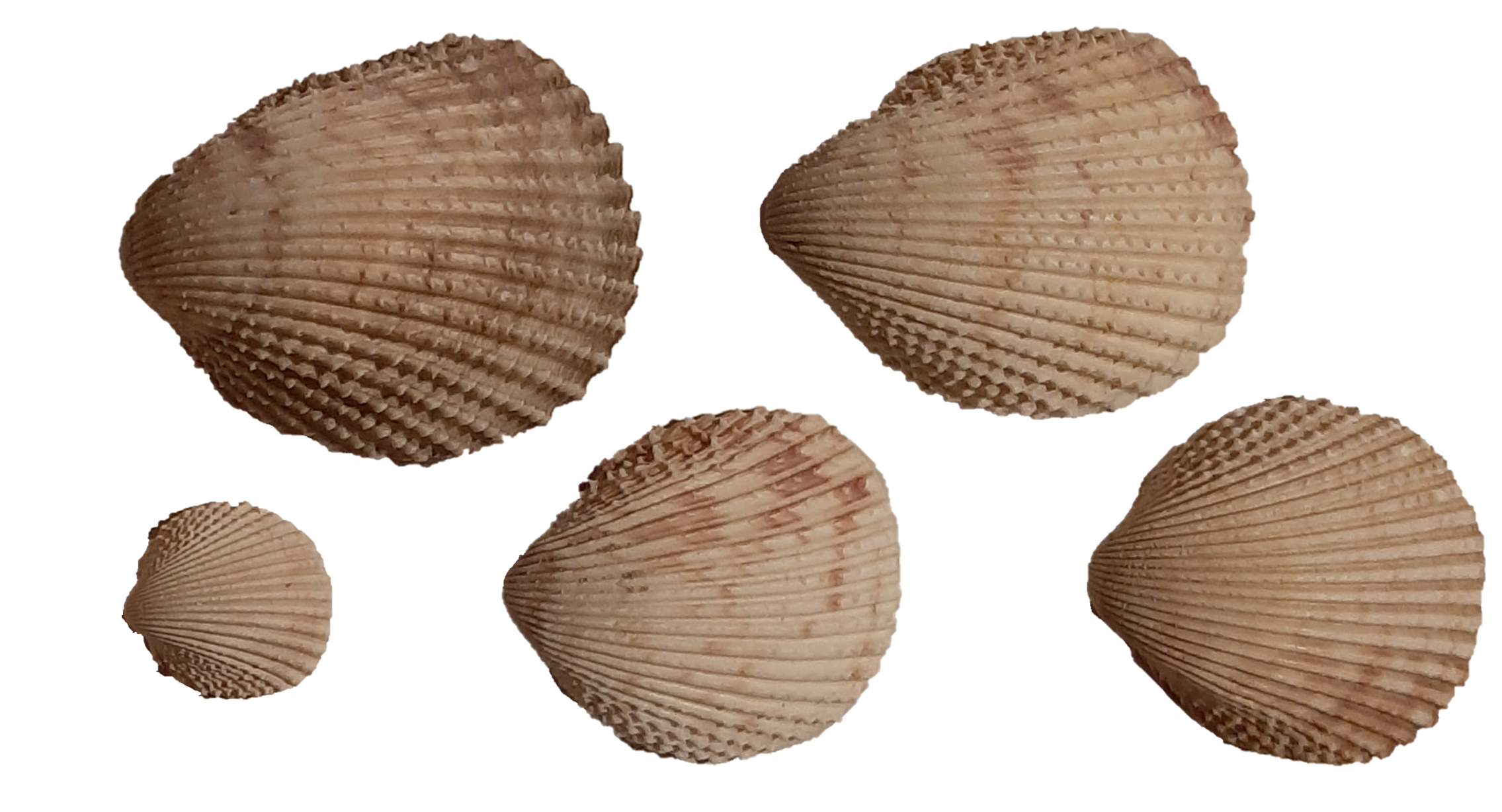
Several Trachycardium egmontianum shell specimens

Shells of Trachycardium egmontianum can reach a size of about 50 millimetres (2.0 in). These shells are oval, with 27 to 31 strong radial ribs. Similar to other species in the genus Trachycardium, T. egmontianum has V-shaped hooks rising along the radial ribs. The external surface is whitish to tawny-gray or pale purplish, with yellow, brown or purplish paths. The glossy interior is pink, reddish or purplish.

== Distribution and habitat ==
The cockle can be found along the Atlantic coast of North America, ranging from North Carolina through Florida and into the West Indies. Within this region, T. egmontianum prefers to live in sandy substrates, allowing for burrowing, within tidal and subtidal depths.

== Ecology ==
The distinctive V-shaped hooks found along the radial ribs of T. egmontianum make burrowing more effective in sandy substrates. This is in part due to the shape of the protrusions shifting water movement over the shell and reducing scouring. The protrusions on the shell also cause asymmetry which further increases the speed at which they can burrow. As the cockle twists during burrowing, the asymmetrical protrusions hook into the sand at times, allowing for grip and glide through the sand at other times making them faster depending on the angle.
