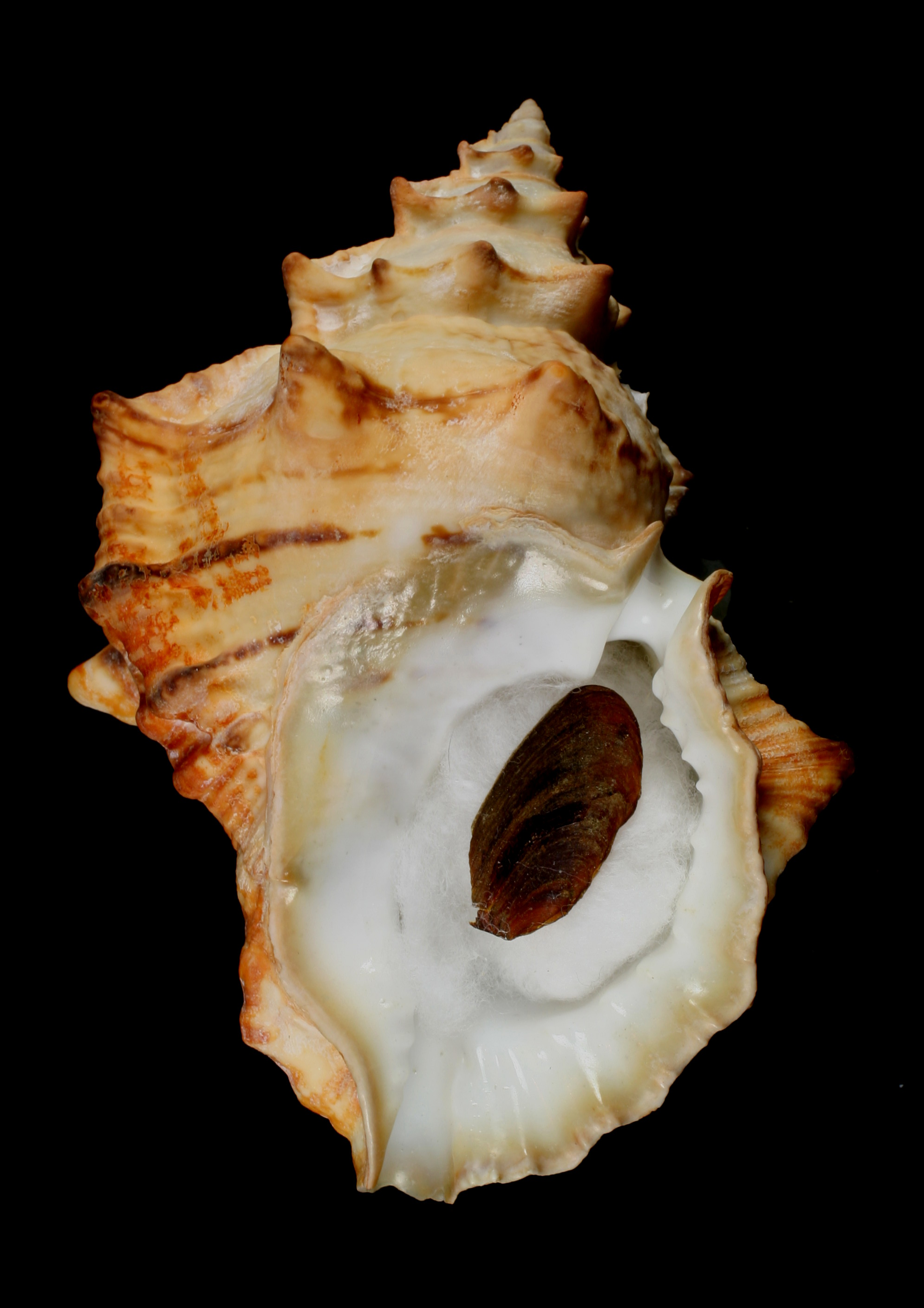
- Apertural view of Crossata ventricosa (Broderip, 1833) with operculum

Scientific classification
- Kingdom: Animalia
- Phylum: Mollusca
- Class: Gastropoda
- Subclass: Caenogastropoda
- Order: Littorinimorpha
- Family: Bursidae
- Genus: Crossata; Jousseaume, 1881

Type species
- Ranella ventricosa Broderip, 1833

= Crossata =

Genus of gastropods

Crossata is a genus of sea snails, marine gastropod mollusks in the family Bursidae, the frog shells.

== Species ==
Species within the genus Crossata include:

- Crossata barbarajeanae C. L. Powell & Berschauer, 2017
- Crossata californica (Hinds, 1843)
- Crossata fuscopicta (Sowerby III, 1893)
- Crossata ventricosa (Broderip, 1833)

Species brought into synonymy

- Crossata californica (Hinds, 1843): synonym of Crossata ventricosa (Broderip, 1833)
