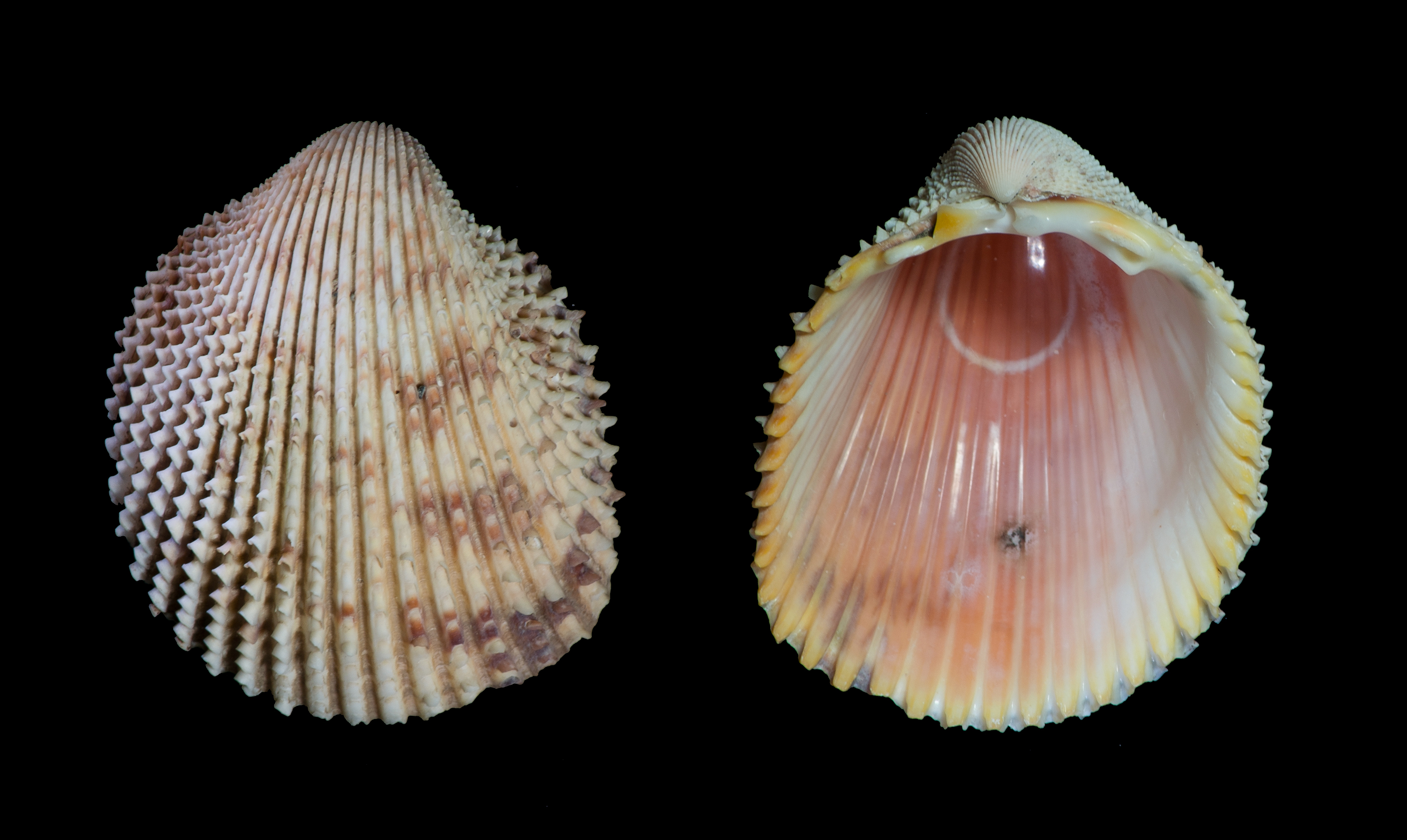

Scientific classification
- Kingdom: Animalia
- Phylum: Mollusca
- Class: Bivalvia
- Order: Cardiida
- Family: Cardiidae
- Genus: Trachycardium
- Species: T. isocardia

Binomial name
- Trachycardium isocardia (Linnaeus, 1758)

= Trachycardium isocardia =

Species of bivalve

Trachycardium isocardia, the West Indian prickly cockle, is a species of bivalve mollusc in the family Cardiidae. It can be found along coast of the West Indies.
