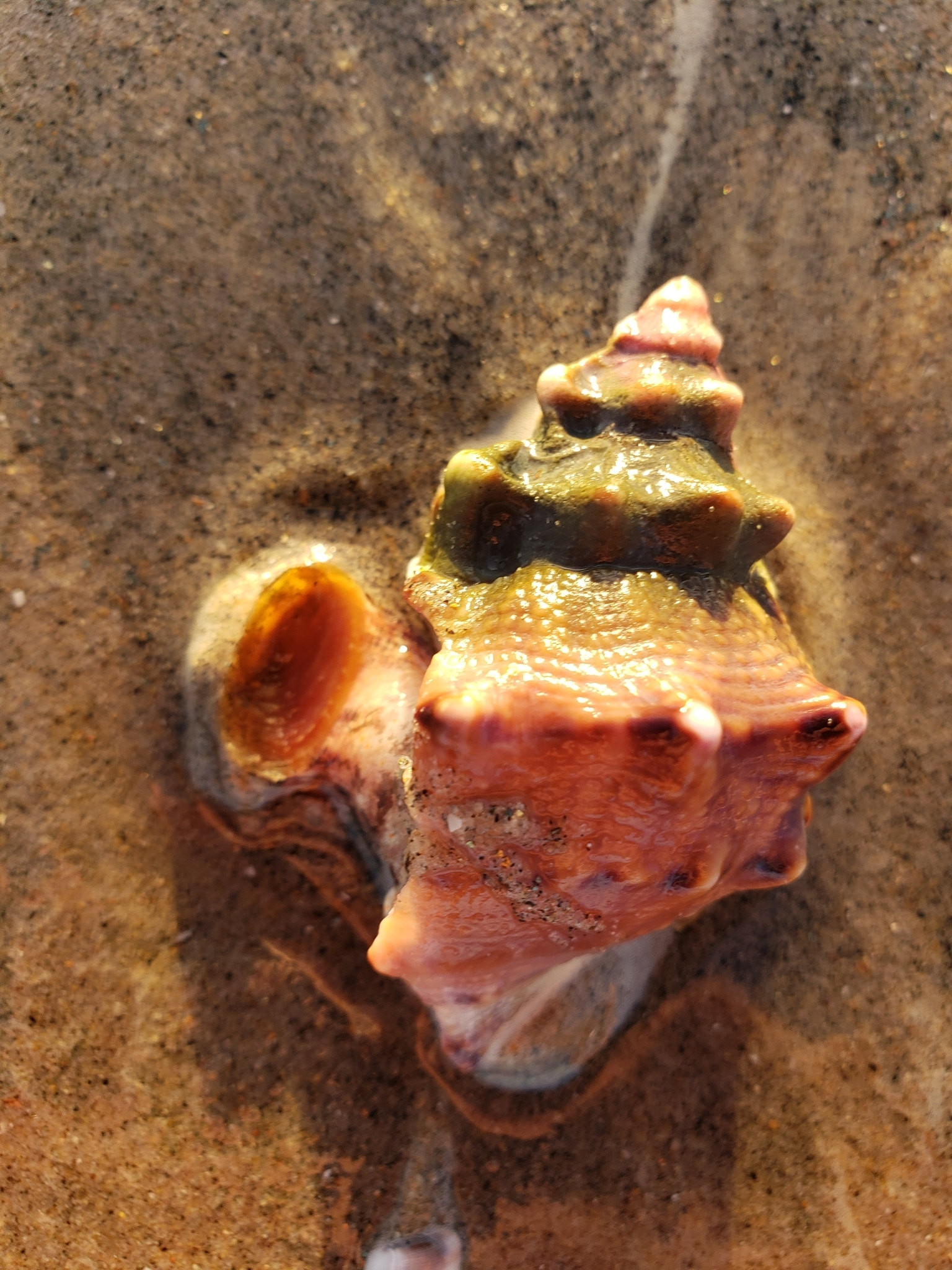
- San Diego County, California, 2023

Scientific classification
- Kingdom: Animalia
- Phylum: Mollusca
- Class: Gastropoda
- Subclass: Caenogastropoda
- Order: Littorinimorpha
- Family: Bursidae
- Genus: Crossata
- Species: C. californica

Binomial name
- Crossata californica Hinds, 1843

= Crossata californica =

Species of mollusk

Crossata californica is a species of marine mollusk. Commonly known as the California frog shell, this mollusk is primarily found on offshore rocks of the Pacific coast of North America. The shells typically measure about 10 centimetres (3.9 in) in length.
