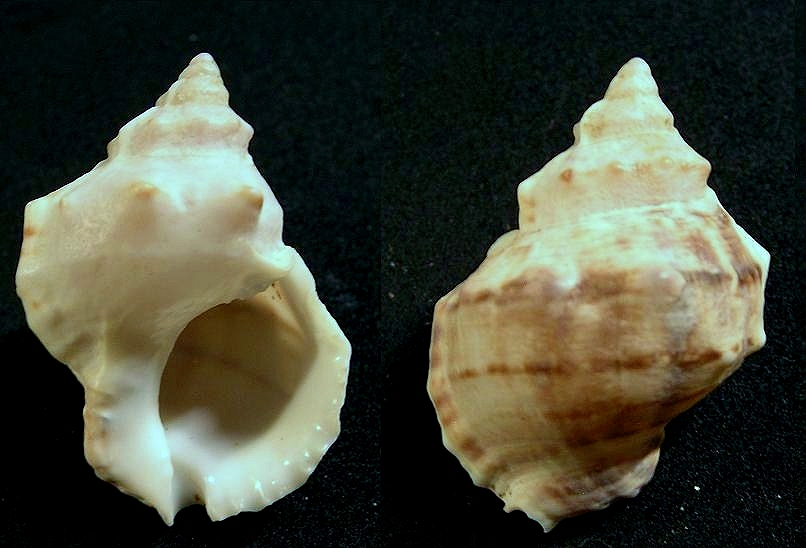
- Several views of a shell of Crossata ventricosa (Broderip, 1833)

Scientific classification
- Kingdom: Animalia
- Phylum: Mollusca
- Class: Gastropoda
- Subclass: Caenogastropoda
- Order: Littorinimorpha
- Family: Bursidae
- Genus: Crossata
- Species: C. ventricosa

Binomial name
- Crossata ventricosa (Broderip, 1833)

Synonyms
- Bursa (Crossata) ventricosa (Broderip,1833); Bursa (Lampadopsis) calcipicta Dall, 1908; Bursa californica (Hinds, 1843); Bursa californica sonorana Berry, 1960; Crossata californica (Hinds, 1843); Ranella californica Hinds, 1843; Ranella tenuis Potiez & Michaud, 1838; Ranella ventricosa Broderip, 1833

= Crossata ventricosa =

Species of gastropod

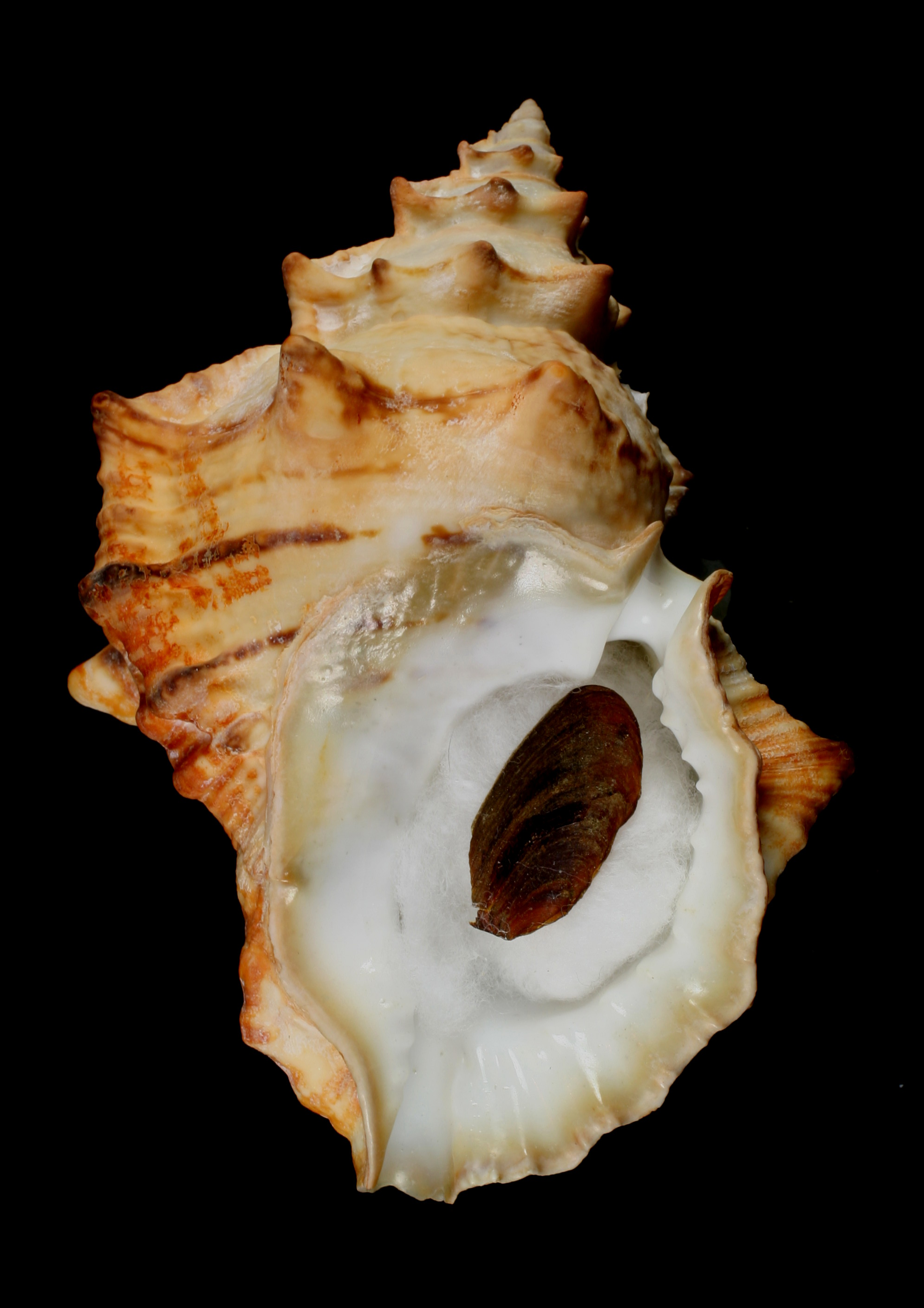
Apertural view Crossata ventricosa (Broderip, 1833) with operculum.

Crossata ventricosa (swollen frog shell) is a species of sea snail, a marine gastropod mollusk in the family Bursidae, the frog shells.

== Description ==
The length of the shell varies between 39 mm and 85 mm.

== Distribution ==
This species occurs in the Pacific Ocean off Chile, Peru, and Ecuador.
