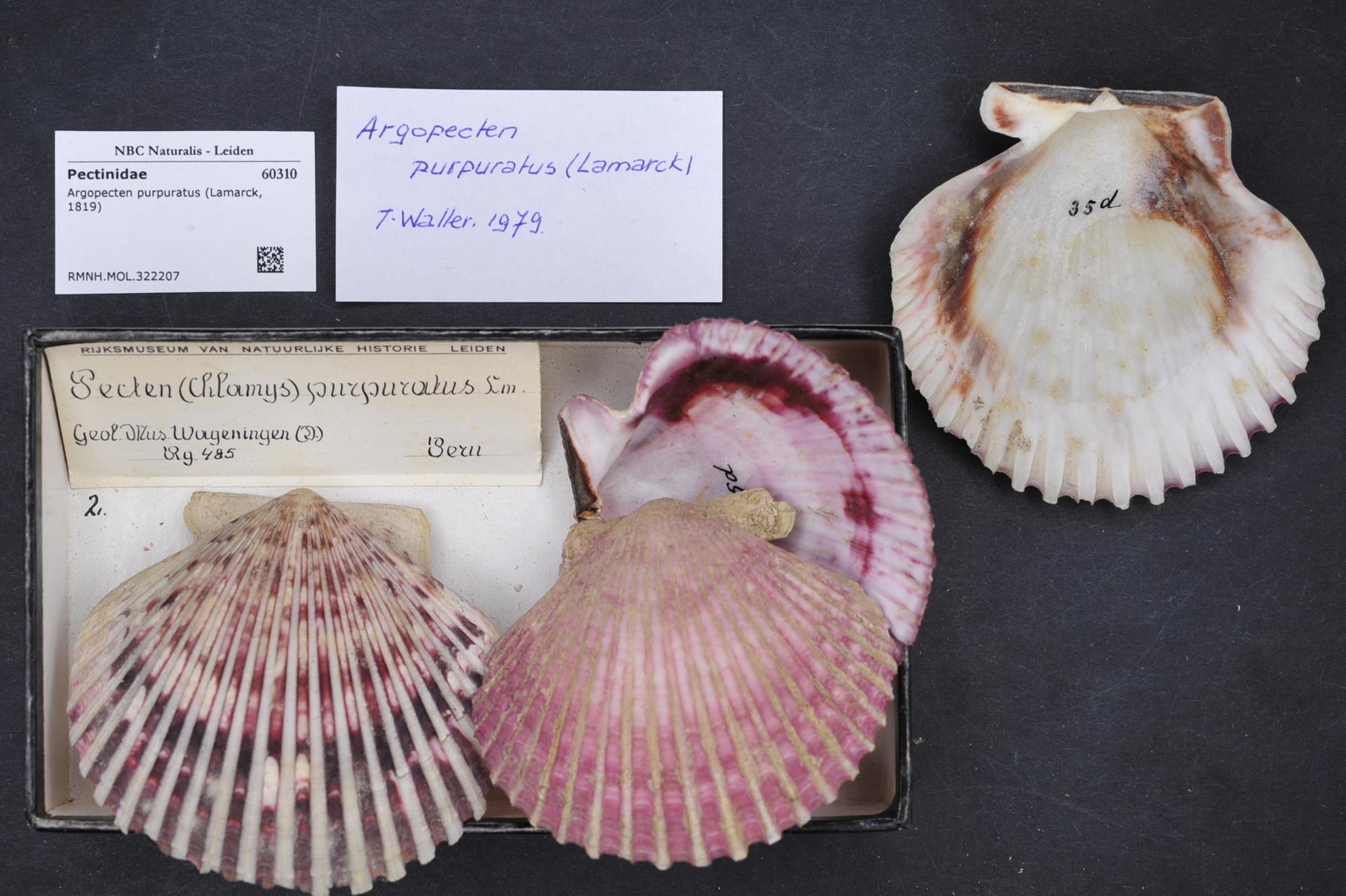

Scientific classification
- Kingdom: Animalia
- Phylum: Mollusca
- Class: Bivalvia
- Order: Pectinida
- Family: Pectinidae
- Genus: Argopecten
- Species: A. purpuratus

Binomial name
- Argopecten purpuratus (Lamarck, 1819)

= Argopecten purpuratus =

Species of bivalve

Argopecten purpuratus is an edible marine species of saltwater shellfish, a bivalve mollusc in the family Pectinidae.

== Habitat ==
This scallop is natural to certain bays in the Southern west coast of south America, from Peru to Chile.

== Peru ==
In Peru, the scallops can be found in large numbers naturally around the following bays:

1. Pisco (300 km South of Lima)
2. Casma y Samanco (400 km north of Lima)
3. Trujillo (600 km north of Lima)
4. Sechura Bay & Paita Bay (900 km north of Lima)

== Commercial value ==
The scallops can be harvested and commercialized to several markets around the world.

In most growth areas, the harvesting of natural grown scallops has been replaced by aquaculture operations. The aquaculture operations consist in re-stocking the natural areas, taking care of the scallops along the grow out period and harvesting at the end of the cycle. Thanks to this practices, the natural banks have recovered and are able to maintain a sustainable production level.

== Markets ==
The demand of scallops is mainly from following markets:

1. USA: Roe Off product
2. France: Roe-On product
3. China: Roe-On & Skirt-On, Whole, products
4. Australia and New Zealand: Roe-On product
5. Spain and Italy: Roe-On on Half shell product
