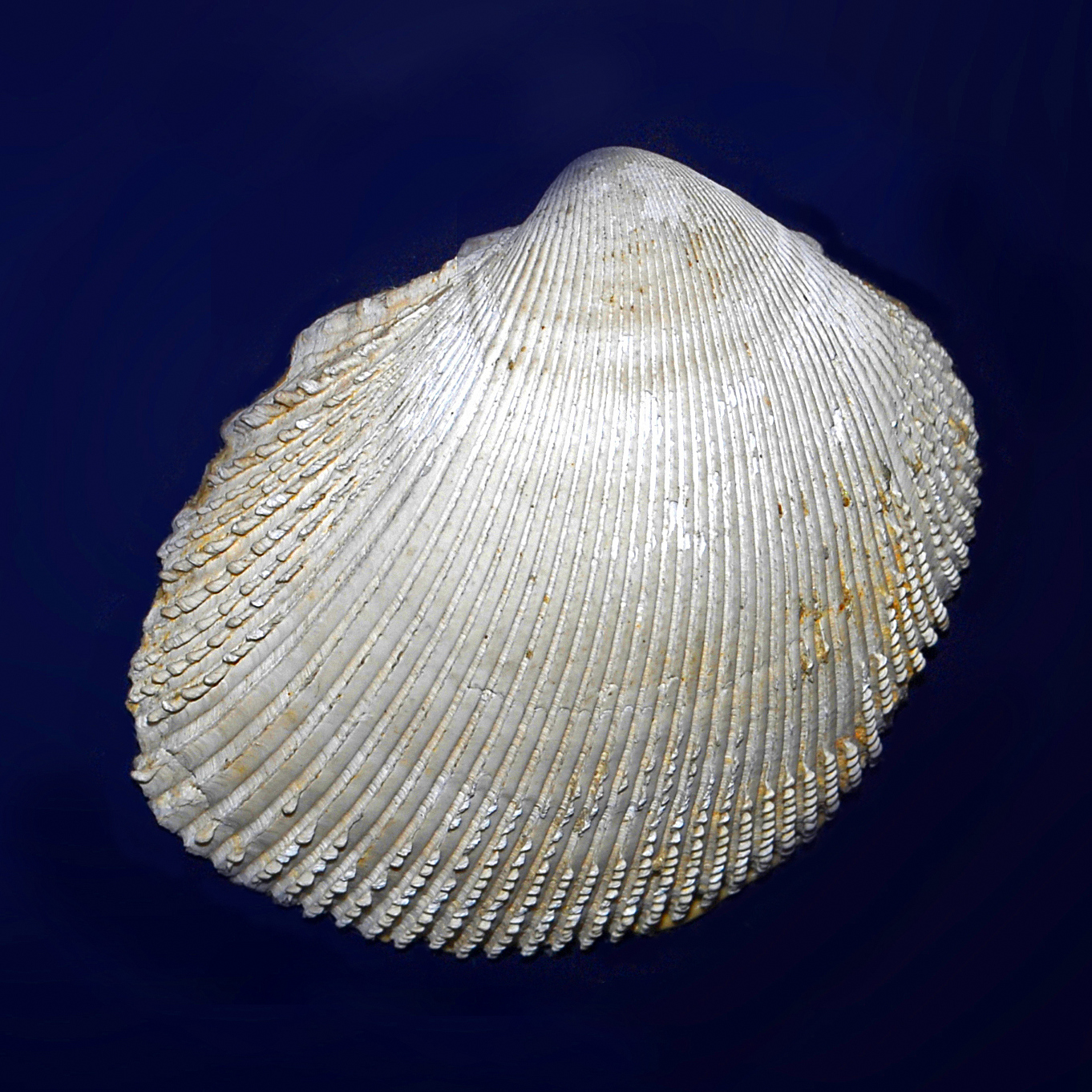
- Fossil valve of Trachycardium multicostatum from Pliocene of Italy

Scientific classification
- Kingdom: Animalia
- Phylum: Mollusca
- Class: Bivalvia
- Order: Cardiida
- Family: Cardiidae
- Genus: Trachycardium; Morch, 1853

= Trachycardium =

Trachycardium Temporal range: Cretaceous - Recent

Genus of bivalves

Trachycardium is a genus of molluscs in the family Cardiidae.

== Fossil records ==
This genus is known in the fossil records from the Cretaceous to the Quaternary (age range: from 109.0 to 0.0 million years ago). Fossils are found in the marine strata throughout the world.

== Species ==
Species within this genus include:

- Trachycardium belcheri (Broderip & G. B. Sowerby I, 1829)
- Trachycardium consors (G. B. Sowerby, 1833)
- Trachycardium egmontianum (Shuttleworth, 1856) — Florida prickly cockle
- Trachycardium isocardia — West Indian prickly cockle
- Trachycardium muricatum (Linnaeus, 1758) — yellow cockle
- Trachycardium procerum (G. B. Sowerby, 1833) — Slender cockle
- Trachycardium rossi Marwick, 1944
