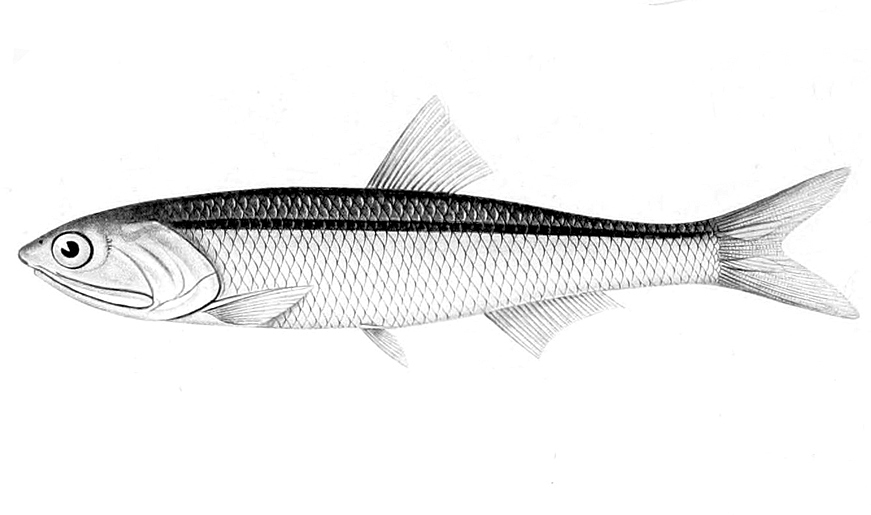

Conservation status
- Least Concern (IUCN 3.1)

Scientific classification
- Kingdom: Animalia
- Phylum: Chordata
- Class: Actinopterygii
- Division: Teleostei
- Order: Clupeiformes
- Family: Engraulidae
- Genus: Engraulis
- Species: E. ringens

Binomial name
- Engraulis ringens Jenyns, 1842

Synonyms
- Anchoviella tapirulus (Cope, 1877); Engraulis pulchellus Girard, 1855; Engraulis tapirulus Cope, 1877; Stolephorus tapirulus (Cope, 1877)

= Peruvian anchoveta =

Species of fish

Global capture production of Anchoveta (Engraulis ringens) in million tonnes from 1950 to 2022, as reported by the FAO

The Peruvian anchoveta (Engraulis ringens) is a species of fish of the anchovy family, Engraulidae, from the Southeast Pacific Ocean. It is one of the most commercially important fish species in the world, with annual harvests varying between 3.14 and 8.32 million tonnes from 2010 to 2021.

== Description ==
Anchoveta were previously thought to eat mostly phytoplankton, small zooplankton, and larvae. However, recent work has shown that anchoveta get most of their energy from larger zooplankton, including macrozooplankton. Krill and large copepods are the most important dietary components.

Peruvian anchoveta live for up to 3 years, reaching 20 cm (8 in). They first reproduce at about 1 year old and 10 cm (4 in) length, whereas they are harvested as early as 6 months of age and 8 cm (3 in) length.

== Distribution ==
Peruvian anchoveta are found in the southeastern Pacific Ocean off Peru and Chile, and typically found in huge schools within 80 km (50 mi) of the coast.

== Fisheries ==
The anchoveta has been characterised as "the most heavily exploited fish in world history". The top yield was 13.1 million tonnes in 1971, but has undergone great fluctuations over time. After a period of plenty in the late 1960s, the population was greatly reduced by overfishing and the 1972 El Niño event, when warm water drifted over the cold Humboldt Current and lowered the depth of the thermocline. Nutrient-rich waters then no longer upwelled, and phytoplankton production decreased, leaving the anchoveta with a depleted food source. A drastic reduction was also brought about by another strong El Niño in the early 1980s, but production was back up to 12.5 million tonnes in 1994. Along with the El Niño of 1982–1983, the 1997–1998 El Niño, the strongest on record, caused a loss in population of the anchoveta, negatively impacting fisheries, and therefore, the economy.

The annual catches in the 2000s varied between 6.2 and 11.3 million tonnes, consistently more than for any other fish species harvested in the wild. However, declining catches fell below both Alaska pollock and skipjack tuna by 2023. In October 2015, an El Niño year, of 3.38 million metric tons of anchoveta surveyed by the Peruvian Marine Research Institute, only 2 million metric tons were of reproductive age; 5 million metric tons are needed to open fisheries. The fishing industry claimed populations were more around 6.8 million metric tons of reproductive-age anchoveta, so despite discrepancies, the Peruvian Ministry of Production allowed the opening of anchoveta fisheries the second season, but with a quota: 1.1 million metric tons, about half the quota of the first season of the year.

Environmental impacts of the anchoveta fishery have also been evaluated using Life-cycle assessment (LCA). These assessments consider emissions from fishing vessels and the processing of anchoveta into fishmeal and fish oil, with fuel consumption being an important contributor to several environmental impact categories. LCA methods can also estimate potential biodiversity impacts associated with the depletion of fish stocks. For anchoveta, these estimates depend on stock abundance and fishing pressure, and may vary substantially between years due to changing environmental conditions, including El Niño and La Niña events. Limitations in the availability and quality of fisheries data introduce uncertainty into these assessments.

== Uses ==
Until about 2005 the anchoveta was almost exclusively used for making fishmeal. Peru produces some of the highest quality fishmeal in the world. Since 2005 anchoveta is increasingly used for direct human consumption, as fresh fish, as canned fish or as salted-matured fillets packed in oil. Peruvian canned anchoveta is sold as Peruvian canned sardines. The new use is sometimes called the second anchoveta boom, the first boom being the discovery and subsequent fishery and fishmeal production in the 1960s/70s. The second boom was kick-started by the Peruvian Fish Technology Institute CIP, assisted by FAO. A large scale promotion campaign including by the then-president of Peru Alan García helped to make the anchoveta known to rich and poor alike. Previously it was not considered as food and hardly known among the population. It is now found in supermarkets and served in restaurants. Still, only 1 percent of anchovy catches are used for direct human consumption and 99 percent continue to be rendered into fishmeal and oil.

Canned anchovy fillets found commonly in the US are intensely salty and are often removed of skin and bones. Often, they are marked as "Product of Morocco," which are salted-matured anchovy fillets. Canned anchovetas are sometimes marketed with the culinary name "Peruvian sardines" to promote domestic and international consumption, as sardines are usually in higher demand. Recently, new ways of preparation for the anchovetas have been developed in Peru, so new products are already in the international market such as anchoveta chicharrones, anchoveta jerky meat, anchoveta paste, and anchoveta steaks.

== Fishing rights ==
The concept of fishing rights varies from country to country. In some countries, fishing rights are imposed, or a required fishing license, while in others, they are based on the underlying concept of resource rent. In this respect, the definition and calculation of fishing rent enables recognition of the payment that the state should receive for the use of a renewable natural resource: in this case anchoveta. The anchoveta fishery is of particular interest, not only because it ranks among the world's largest, but because in 2008 Peru passed the Maximum Catch Limit per Vessel Law (Ley de Límites Máximos de Captura por Embarcación, LMCE), which entails the assignment of resource usage rights. Economic theory holds that the implementation of the resource rent means that it is the maximum possible compared with the open access status that previously existed. If fishery is of open access, there will be no resource rent due to the presence of a very large number of fishing boats, which leads to the extraction of the resource beyond biologically sustainable levels. Meanwhile, if a fishery falls under a regime of assigned property rights, then the rent generated will be positive and will guarantee a biologically and economically efficient level of extraction. Peruvian fishing regulations stipulate a charge for fishing rights as payment for the use of a resource belonging to the nation. Each boat owner is charged for fishing rights based on a percentage of the price of fishmeal per ton landed. Recently there has been debate as to the relevance of the quantity of fish landed and whether this genuinely reflects the resource rent, given that the implementation of LMCEs have prompted an increase in the value of the anchoveta resource.
