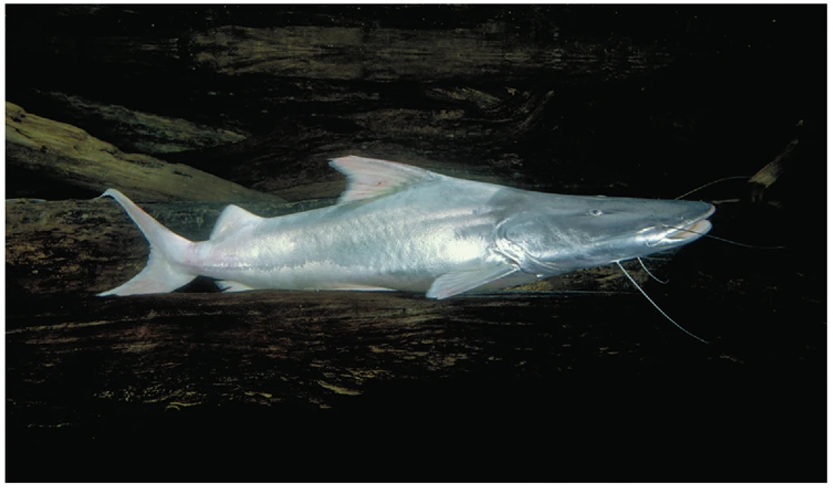

Conservation status
- Vulnerable (IUCN 3.1)

Scientific classification
- Kingdom: Animalia
- Phylum: Chordata
- Class: Actinopterygii
- Division: Teleostei
- Order: Siluriformes
- Family: Pimelodidae
- Genus: Brachyplatystoma
- Species: B. rousseauxii

Binomial name
- Brachyplatystoma rousseauxii (Castelnau, 1855)

Synonyms
- Bagrus goliath; Bagrus rousseauxii; Brachyplatystoma paraense

= Brachyplatystoma rousseauxii =

Species of catfish

Brachyplatystoma rousseauxii, the gilded catfish or dorado catfish or dourada (Note: ("golden" in Portuguese, a common name for fish)), is a species of catfish of the family Pimelodidae that is native to the Amazon and Orinoco River basins and major rivers of French Guiana.

== Etymology ==
Named in honor of Louis Rousseau (1811–1874), assistant naturalist, Muséum d'histoire naturelle in Paris.

== Description ==
It grows to a length of 192 cm (76 in). Its body is characterized by a platinum head and gold body. Adults have short barbels. Caudal-fin in adults deeply-forked with narrow lobes.

== Distribution ==
It is a widespread species that is found in fluvial systems in the Guianas and northeastern Brazil and Amazon and Orinoco river drainage.

== Ecology ==
It is a demersal (Bottom feeder) that commonly inhabits deeper, flowing channels. It is primarily piscivorous, (eats fish) with the adults taking a wide variety of fish: recorded prey include other catfish (Auchenipterus nuchalis, Cetopsis coecutiens, Hypoptopoma sp., Pinirampus pirinampu, Pimelodus sp., Platysilurus barbatus), characiformes (Curimata sp., Hydrolycus scomberoides, Mylossoma duriventris, Potamorhina spp., Prochilodus nigricans, Psectrogaster spp., Schizodon fasciatus, Tetragonopterus sp., Triportheus spp.) and anchovies (Lycengraulis spp.). Rarer food items were plant matter (42.8% of total food items) and insects (1.8% of total), but the majority of dorado stomachs held no food at all time points in the study by García Vasquez et al. (2009). Larvae drifting downriver consume invertebrates, such as planktonic crustaceans and aquatic insects.

Developing larvae are carried downriver by the flow, all the way to estuarine habitats. Juveniles and sub adults are migratory, traveling upriver back to its spawning grounds. It is considered to have the longest freshwater migration of any known fish species, with some fish travelling 5,500 kilometres (3,400 mi) from the mouth of the Amazon to their spawning grounds. Females mature at larger sizes than males, both at around 80 centimetres (31 in); in the Caqueta, they matured between their third and fourth year, which is later than the fish in the Peruvian Amazon which mature around 2.5 years old. Longevity is estimated at 11–13 years; a 143 cm (56-inch) female was found to be 12.9 years old.

== Relation to humans ==
The dourada is an important species for fisheries, being considered one of two most important catfish species in that regard, and considered the most important in the western Amazon.
