= Dorado (disambiguation) =

Dorado is a southern constellation.

Dorado may also refer to:

== Biology ==
- Coryphaena, a genus of oceanic fish also known as dolphinfishes
  - Mahi-mahi
- Salminus, freshwater fish from South America
  - Salminus brasiliensis, a popular sport fish

== Computers ==
- Dorado Software, IT company specializing in the development of network management software
- Xerox Dorado, a CPU used as a developer machine at Xerox PARC and in the Xerox 1132 Lisp machine
- ClearPath Dorado computers, by Unisys

== Other uses ==
- Dorado (album) by Son of the Velvet Rat, 2017
- Dorado (grape), another name for the Portuguese wine grape Loureira
- "Dorado" (song), a 2020 song by Mahmood, Sfera Ebbasta and Feid
- Dorado, Puerto Rico, a municipality in Puerto Rico
- Dorado Airport, (IATA Code:DDS) a former airport in Dorado, Puerto Rico
- Dorado Wings, a Puerto Rican airline that operated between 1964 and 1988
- Javier Dorado (1977–2025), Spanish footballer
- Dorados de Sinaloa, a Mexican professional football club

== See also ==
- El Dorado
- USS Dorado
- USCGC Dorado
- Dorada (game), a board game published in 1988
- Dourado (disambiguation)
