= Catuá-Ipixuna Extractive Reserve =

- Reserva Extrativista Catuá-Ipixuna
- IUCN category VI (protected area with sustainable use of natural resources)

- Location within Brazil
- Nearest city: Coari, Amazonas
- Coordinates: 3.864424°S 64.179585°W
- Area: 217,486 hectares (537,420 acres)
- Designation: Extractive reserve
- Created: 5 September 2003
- Administrator: Secretaria de Estado do Meio Ambiente do Amazonas

The Catuá-Ipixuna Extractive Reserve (Portuguese: Reserva Extrativista Catuá-Ipixuna) is an extractive reserve in the state of Amazonas, Brazil. It takes its name from two lakes that drain into the Solimões River, or Upper Amazon, and is covered in Amazon rainforest.

== Location ==
The Catuá-Ipixuna Extractive Reserve is divided between the municipalities of Tefé (33.85%) and Coari ( 66.15%) in the state of Amazonas. It has an area of 217,486 hectares (537,420 acres). The reserve is 424 kilometres (263 mi) from Manaus. It is on the south (right) bank of the Solimões River between the towns of Coari and Tefé. It does not adjoin any other protected area or indigenous territory. The reserve is in relatively flat country with altitudes of around 40 metres (130 ft) in the basins of the Catuá and Ipixuna lakes and the Solimões River.

== History ==
Catuá-Ipixuna is the first extractive reserve to be created by the Amazonas government. The reserve was created by Amazonas state decree 23.722 of 5 September 2003. It became part of the Central Amazon Ecological Corridor, established in 2002. Exploitation of mineral resources and amateur or professional hunting is prohibited. Commercial exploitation of timber resources is only allowed on a sustainable basis and in special situations. Related activities may be undertaken in the reserve as provided in the management plan.

On 28 July 2004 the reserve, with an area of 215,342.879 hectares (532,123.84 acres) was recognised as meeting the needs of 300 families of small farmers, who would qualify for PRONAF support. The reserve's council was created on 28 January 2008. The management plan is dated February 2010. It was issued on 31 December 2010 although it was not made official by a decree or other legislative instrument. As of 2016 the reserve was supported by the Amazon Region Protected Areas Program.

== Environment ==
The climate is hot and humid. Temperatures vary from 23 to 35 °C (73 to 95 °F). Average annual rainfall is 2,500 millimetres (98 in). Vegetation includes terra firma forest and lowland várzea and igapó forest. The terra firm forest includes typical dense and open Amazon rainforest, with dense forest predominating. The soil is fertile and supports a high level of botanical diversity. Trees include a significant number with economic value. The open forest includes a wide variety of palm trees.

More than 70 species of reptiles have been identified. Fish in the two lakes include abundant members of the genera Potamorhina, Psectrogaster and Curimata. Important bird species include the toco toucan (Ramphastos toco) and Klages's antwren (Myrmotherula klagesi), both in the extreme west of their ranges, and the little-known wattled curassow (Crax globulosa) of the várzea, which may be threatened with extinction.

== Economy ==
In 2006 it was estimated that there were 287 families in the reserve, with 1,457 people. A floating support base for the reserve has been installed at the mouth of Catuá Lake, and the reserve has an office in the town of Tefé. There are 16 communities in the reserve. Access is via float plane or boat. The main source of income for the residents is production of flour, and the sale of cassava and bananas. They also extract Brazil nuts and practice subsistence fishing and hunting.

== Sources ==
- Aurelina Viana dos Santos (February 2010), Plano de Gestão da Reserva Extrativista Catuá-ipixuna (PDF) (in Portuguese), vol. i e ii, Tefé and Coari
- CEC Central da Amazônia (in Portuguese), ISA: Instituto Socioambiental
- Full list: PAs supported by ARPA, ARPA
- RESEX Catuá-Ipixuna (in Portuguese), ISA: Instituto Socioambiental
