= Cyphocharax festivus =

Conservation status
- Least Concern (IUCN 3.1)

Scientific classification
- Kingdom: Animalia
- Phylum: Chordata
- Class: Actinopterygii
- Order: Characiformes
- Family: Curimatidae
- Genus: Cyphocharax
- Species: C. festivus

Binomial name
- Cyphocharax festivus Vari, 1992

Species of fish

Cyphocharax festivus is a species of freshwater ray-finned fish belonging to the family Curimatidae, the toothless characins. This species is found in South America.
