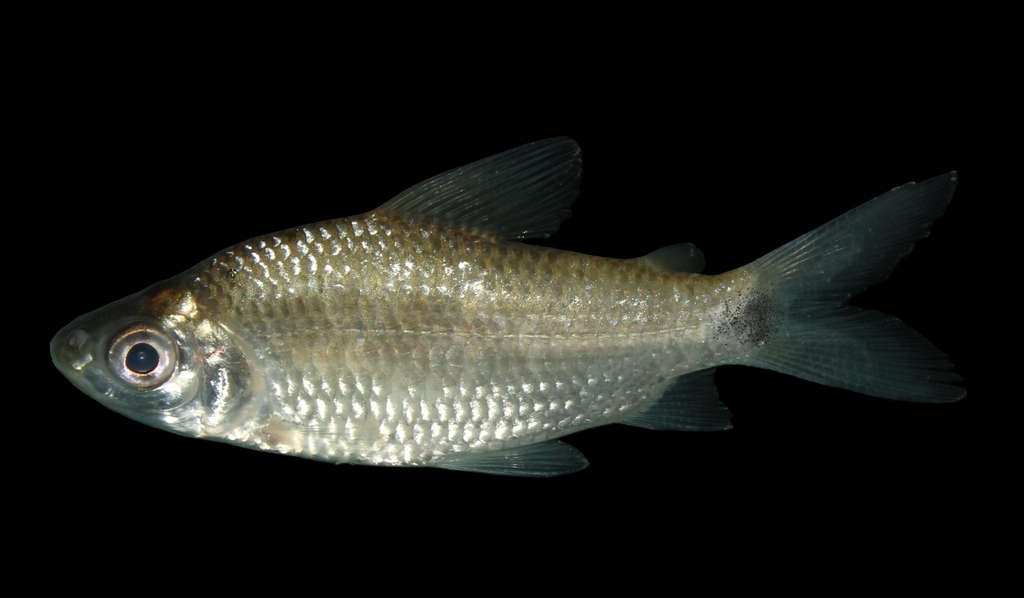

Conservation status
- Least Concern (IUCN 3.1)

Scientific classification
- Kingdom: Animalia
- Phylum: Chordata
- Class: Actinopterygii
- Order: Characiformes
- Family: Curimatidae
- Genus: Curimatella
- Species: C. dorsalis

Binomial name
- Curimatella dorsalis (C. H. Eigenmann & R. S. Eigenmann, 1889)

Synonyms
- Curimatella alburnus var. australe C. H. Eigenmann & C. H. Kennedy, 1903; Curimatella australe C. H. Eigenmann & C. H. Kennedy, 1903; Curimatus elegans var. paraguayensis C. H. Eigenmann & C. H. Kennedy, 1903; Curimatus (Curimatella) alburnus var. caudimaculatus Pellegrin, 1909; Curimatus bolivarensis Steindachner, 1910; Curimatella bolivarensis (Steindachner, 1910)

= Curimatella dorsalis =

Species of fish

Curimatella dorsalis is a species of freshwater ray-finned fish belonging to the family Curimatidae, the toothless characins. This species is found in South America in the Orinoco, Amazon, Tocantins, and Paraguay-lower Paraná River basins.
