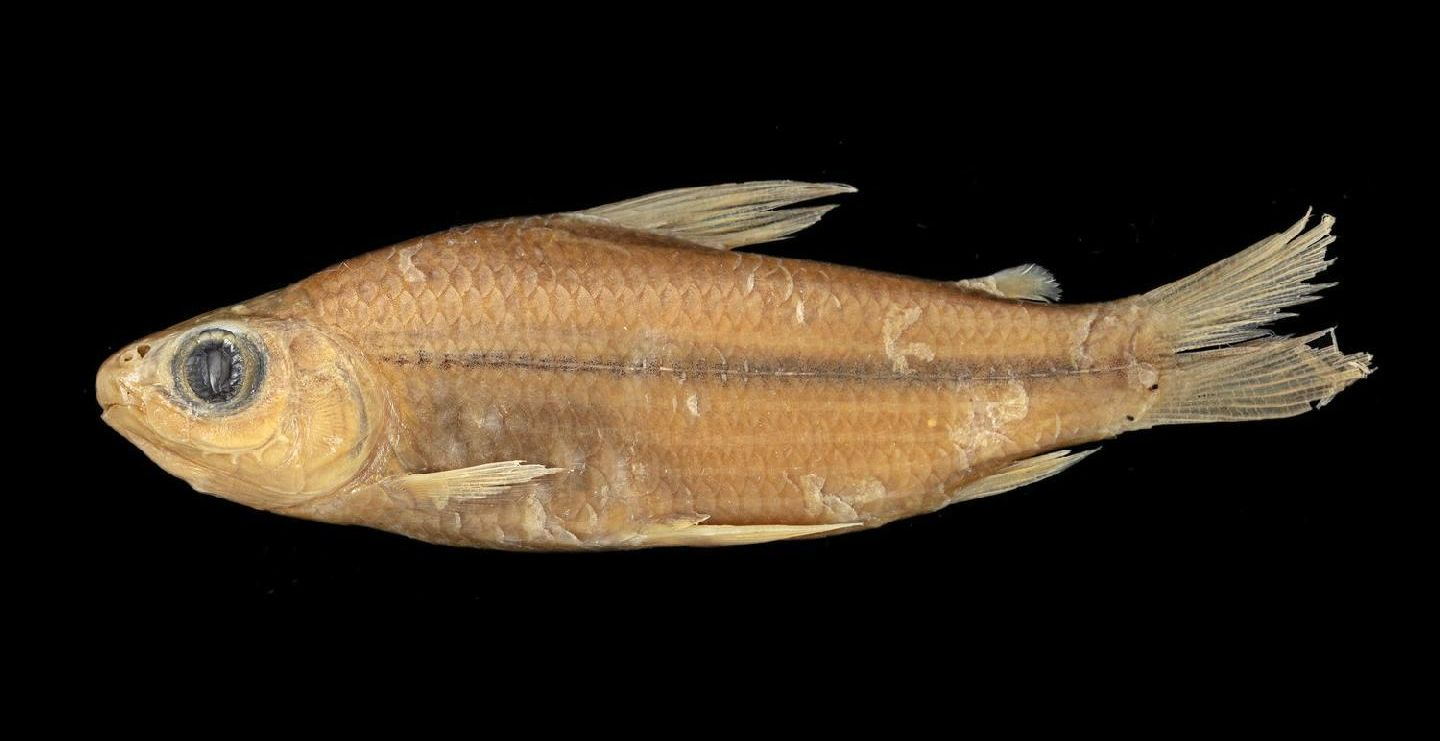
- Preserved specimen in the Natural History Museum

Conservation status
- Least Concern (IUCN 3.1)

Scientific classification
- Kingdom: Animalia
- Phylum: Chordata
- Class: Actinopterygii
- Order: Characiformes
- Family: Curimatidae
- Genus: Steindachnerina
- Species: S. elegans

Binomial name
- Steindachnerina elegans (Steindachner, 1875)

Synonyms
- Curimata elegans Steindachner, 1875; Pseudocurimata elegans var. bahiensis (C. H. Eigenmann & R. S. Eigenmann, 1889)

= Steindachnerina elegans =

Species of fish

Steindachnerina elegans is a species of freshwater ray-finned fish belonging to the family Curimatidae, the toothless characins. This species is found in rivers in Bahia and Minas Gerais, Brazil.
