= USS Dorado =

Two submarines of the United States Navy have been named USS Dorado, the Spanish language name for the fish also known as the dolphinfish and the mahi-mahi. Dorado also the name of southern hemisphere constellation.

- USS Dorado (SS-248) was lost in 1943 during her first voyage, possibly to friendly fire.
- USS Dorado (SS-526) was cancelled in 1944.
