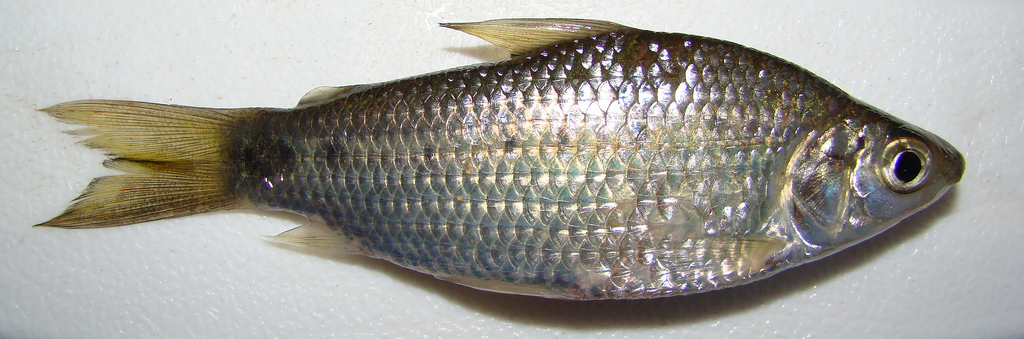
- Cyphocharax voga

Scientific classification
- Kingdom: Animalia
- Phylum: Chordata
- Class: Actinopterygii
- Order: Characiformes
- Family: Curimatidae
- Genus: Cyphocharax; Fowler, 1906

Type species
- Curimatus spilurus Günther, 1864

Synonyms
- Xyrocharax Fowler, 1914; Hemicurimata Myers, 1929; Curimatoides Fowler, 1940

= Cyphocharax =

Cyphocharax Temporal range: Oligocene to present

Genus of fishes

Cyphocharax is a genus of freshwater ray-finned fishes belonging to the family Curimatidae, toothless characins. The fishes in this genus are found in South America.

== Species ==
These are the currently recognized species in this genus:

=== Extant species ===
- Cyphocharax abramoides (Kner, 1858)
- Cyphocharax albiventris Netto-Ferreira, Nogueira, Melo & Dutra, 2024
- Cyphocharax albula (Lütken, 1875)
- Cyphocharax aninha Wosiacki & Miranda, 2014
- Cyphocharax aspilos Vari, 1992
- Cyphocharax biocellatus Vari, Sidlauskas & Le Bail, 2012
- Cyphocharax boiadeiro Melo, 2017
- Cyphocharax caboclo Melo, Tencatt & Oliveira, 2022
- Cyphocharax corumbae (Pavanelli & Britski, 1999)
- Cyphocharax cramptoni Bortolo & Lima, 2020
- Cyphocharax derhami Vari & Chang, 2006
- Cyphocharax festivus Vari, 1992
- Cyphocharax gangamon Vari, 1992
- Cyphocharax gilbert (Quoy & Gaimard, 1824)
- Cyphocharax gillii (C. H. Eigenmann & C. H. Kennedy 1903)
- Cyphocharax gouldingi Vari, 1992
- Cyphocharax helleri (Steindachner, 1910)
- Cyphocharax ivo Melo, Gama & Sabaj Pérez, 2025
- Cyphocharax jagunco Dutra, Penido, Guimarães de Mello & Pessali, 2016
- Cyphocharax laticlavius Vari & Blackledge, 1996
- Cyphocharax leucostictus (C. H. Eigenmann & R. S. Eigenmann, 1889)
- Cyphocharax magdalenae (Steindachner, 1878)
- Cyphocharax meniscaprorus Vari, 1992
- Cyphocharax mestomyllon Vari, 1992
- Cyphocharax microcephalus (C. H. Eigenmann & R. S. Eigenmann, 1889)
- Cyphocharax modestus (Fernández-Yépez, 1948)
- Cyphocharax multilineatus (Myers, 1927)
- Cyphocharax muyrakytan Bortolo, Lima & Melo, 2018
- Cyphocharax naegelii (Steindachner, 1881)
- Cyphocharax nigripinnis Vari, 1992
- Cyphocharax notatus (Steindachner, 1908)
- Cyphocharax oenas Vari, 1992
- Cyphocharax orion Melo & Faria, 2024
- Cyphocharax pantostictos Vari & Barriga Salazar, 1990
- Cyphocharax pinnilepis Vari, Zanata & Camelier, 2010
- Cyphocharax platanus (Günther, 1880)
- Cyphocharax plumbeus (C. H. Eigenmann & R. S. Eigenmann, 1889)
- Cyphocharax punctatus (Vari & Nijssen, 1986)
- Cyphocharax saladensis (Meinken, 1933)
- Cyphocharax sanctigabrielis Melo & Vari, 2014
- Cyphocharax santacatarinae (Fernández-Yépez, 1948)
- Cyphocharax signatus Vari, 1992
- Cyphocharax spilotus (Vari, 1987)
- Cyphocharax spiluropsis (C. H. Eigenmann & R. S. Eigenmann, 1889)
- Cyphocharax spilurus (Günther, 1864)
- Cyphocharax stilbolepis Vari, 1992
- Cyphocharax tamuya Dutra, Vita, Gentile, Ochoa & Netto-Ferreira, 2022
- Cyphocharax vanderi (Britski, 1980)
- Cyphocharax vexillapinnus Vari, 1992
- Cyphocharax voga (Hensel, 1870)

=== Extinct species ===
- †Cyphocharax mosesi (Travassos & Santos, 1955) (fossil; Oligocene of Tremembé Formation, Brazil)
