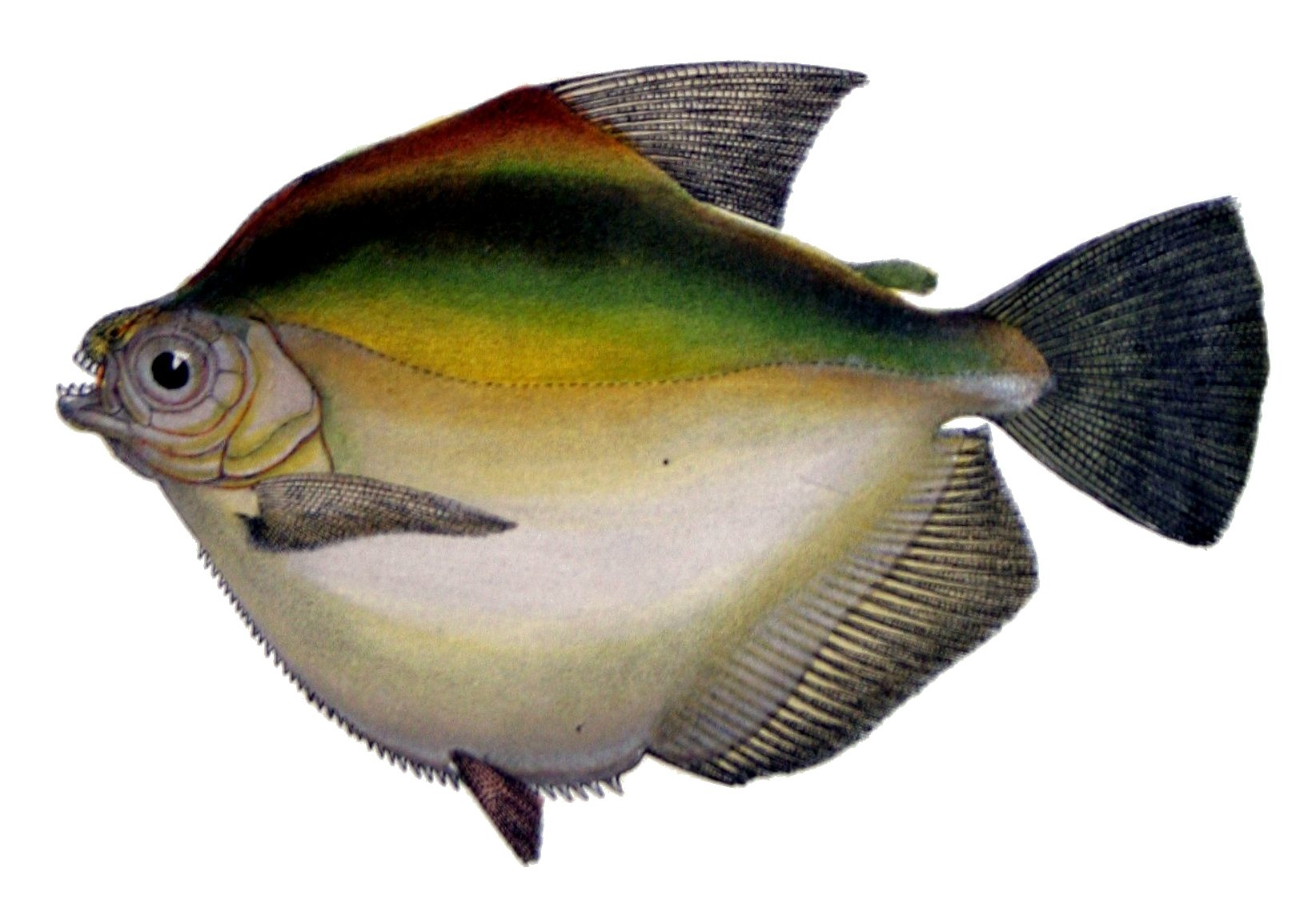
- Painting by Castelnau, 1856
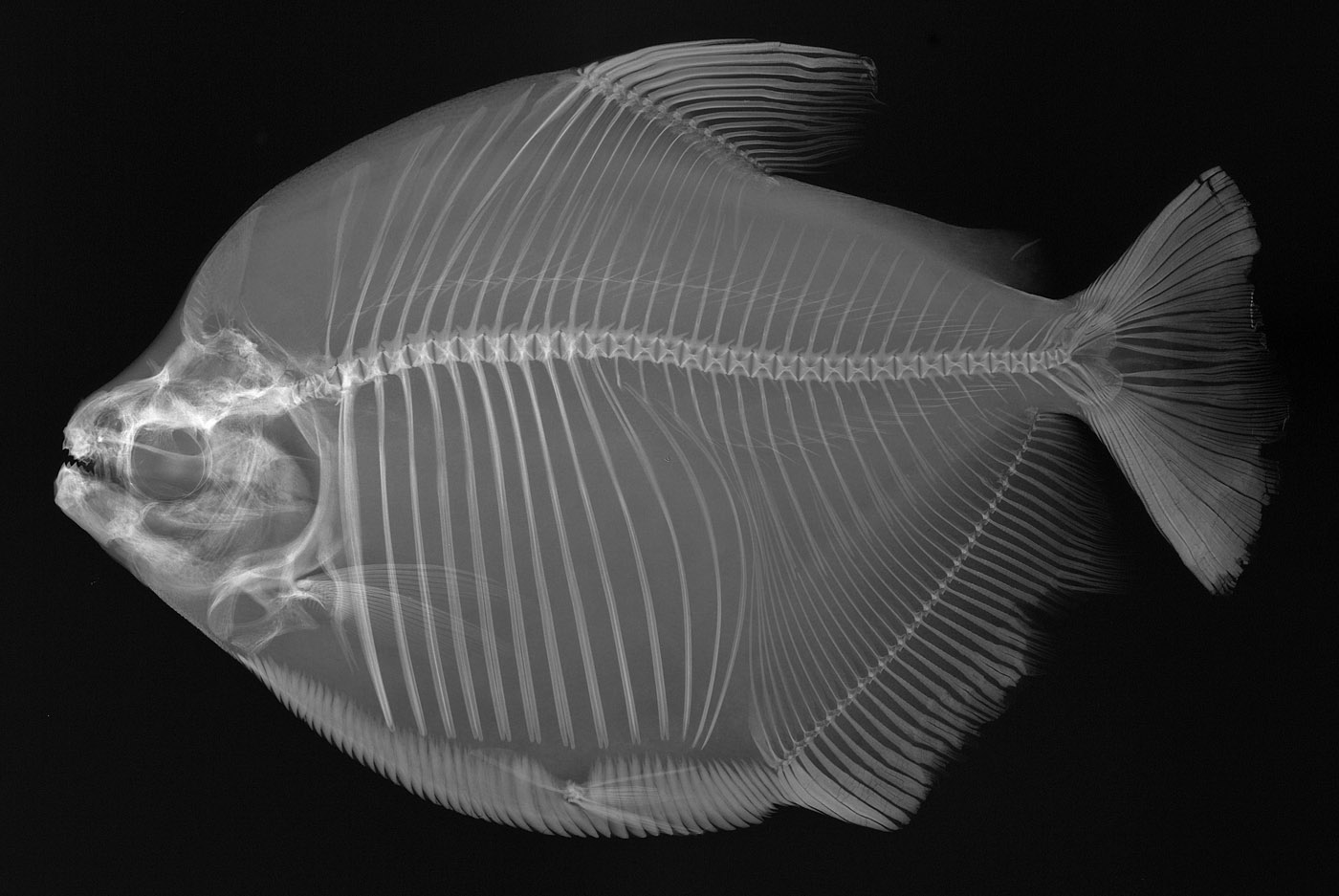
- X-ray image

Conservation status
- Least Concern (IUCN 3.1)

Scientific classification
- Kingdom: Animalia
- Phylum: Chordata
- Class: Actinopterygii
- Order: Characiformes
- Family: Serrasalmidae
- Genus: Mylossoma
- Species: M. duriventre

Binomial name
- Mylossoma duriventre G. Cuvier, 1818

= Mylossoma duriventre =

Species of fish

Mylossoma duriventre, the silver mylossoma, is a species of freshwater serrasalmid fish endemic to tropical and subtropical South America. It grows to a maximum length of about 25 cm (10 in) and a weight of 1 kg (2.2 lb). It is the subject of a local fishery, being known as 'pacu' in Brazil and 'palometa' in Venezuela (names it shares with several relatives).

== Distribution and habitat ==
As traditionally defined, Mylossoma duriventre is native to the Amazon, Orinoco and Río de la Plata basins, and to the Tocantins River and its western tributary, the Araguaia River. It prefers nutrient-rich waters but also occurs in the lower stretches of nutrient-poor rivers.

In 2018, a review based on DNA and morphometrics restricted its range to the Río de la Plata Basin (Paraguay, lower Paraná and Uruguay rivers). Two species formerly considered synonyms of M. duriventre have been revalidated: M. albiscopum of the Amazon and Orinoco basins, and M. unimaculatum of the Tocantins–Araguaia basin.

== Ecology ==
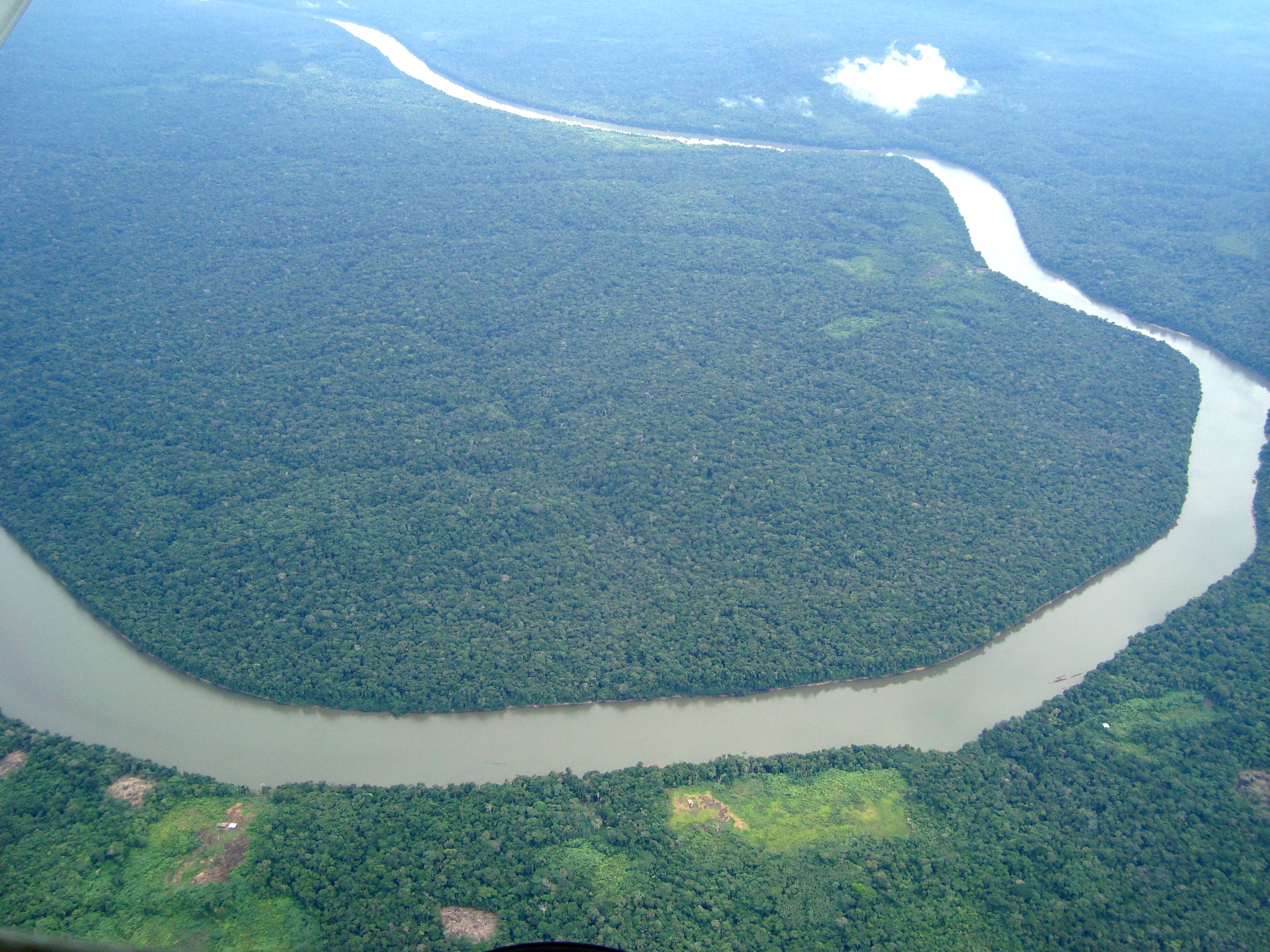
Várzea forest which floods in the rainy season

This species is potamodromous, migrating entirely within freshwater habitats. The migration pattern is not fully understood, but in the flood season in the Amazon, between December and March, the fish migrate from the lakes and pools on the floodplain to the larger rivers. Here they move upstream in large numbers to the spawning areas, although precisely where the fish spawn is unclear. The adults then move out of the rivers and onto the floor of the forest when this floods. The larvae meanwhile are swept downstream, and when the forest floods, spread out into nursery areas on the floodplain where their planktonic food is more readily available. When the waters recede, both adults and juvenile fish move back into the rivers and move upstream to the floodplain lakes. In the seasonally-flooded várzea forest, this fish is often found living in close association with Potamorhina altamazonica.

Juvenile M. duriventre feed on insects and adults feed on fruits and seeds.

== Threats ==
In parts of its range, M. duriventre is considered to be a vulnerable species. The threats it faces include the encroachment of agriculture on the forest habitat, mining, hydroelectric schemes, overfishing, tourism and recreational activities. The seasonal flooding of the forest is important for the survival of the larvae of this fish.
