= Curimatopsis =

Scientific classification
- Kingdom: Animalia
- Phylum: Chordata
- Class: Actinopterygii
- Order: Characiformes
- Family: Curimatidae
- Genus: Curimatopsis; Steindachner, 1876

Type species
- Curimatus (Curimatopsis) macrolepis Steindachner, 1876

Species
- 11, see text

Synonyms
- Curimatichthys Fernández-Yépez, 1948

Genus of fishes

Curimatopsis is a genus of small South American fish in the family Curimatidae. They are native to freshwater habitats in the Amazon, Orinoco and Paraguay basins, as well as rivers of the Guianas.

== Species ==
These are the currently recognized species in this genus:

- Curimatopsis cryptica Vari, 1982
- Curimatopsis evelynae Géry, 1964
- Curimatopsis guaporensis Melo & Oliveira, 2017
- Curimatopsis jaci Melo & Oliveira, 2017
- Curimatopsis macrolepis (Steindachner, 1876)
- Curimatopsis maculosa Melo, Vari & Oliveira, 2016
- Curimatopsis melanura Dutra, Melo & Netto-Ferreira, 2018.
- Curimatopsis microlepis C. H. Eigenmann & R. S. Eigenmann, 1889
- Curimatopsis myersi Vari, 1982
- Curimatopsis pallida Melo & Oliveira, 2017
- Curimatopsis sabana Melo, 2020
