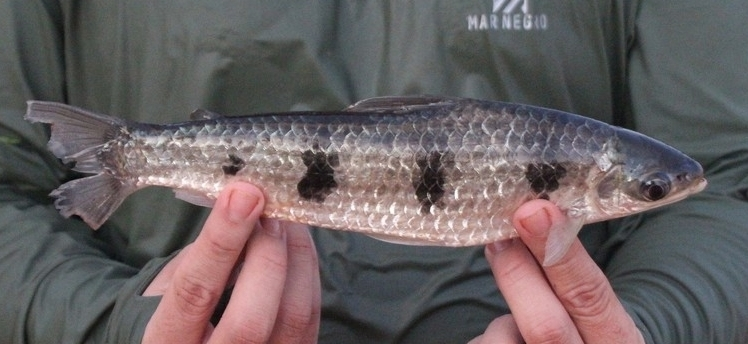
- Schizodon borellii

Scientific classification
- Kingdom: Animalia
- Phylum: Chordata
- Class: Actinopterygii
- Order: Characiformes
- Family: Anostomidae
- Subfamily: Leporininae
- Genus: Schizodon; Agassiz, 1829

Type species
- Schizodon fasciatus Spix & Agassiz, 1829

Synonyms
- Lahilliella C. H. Eigenmann & C. H. Kennedy, 1903

= Schizodon =

Genus of fishes

Schizodon is a genus of headstander from South America. Though found widely in tropical freshwater habitats in the continent, the greatest species richness is in the Paraná–Paraguay–Uruguay river basin. They reach up to 40 cm (1.3 ft) in standard length. They are herbivorous, feeding on fruits, seeds, algae, macrophytes, leaves and roots.

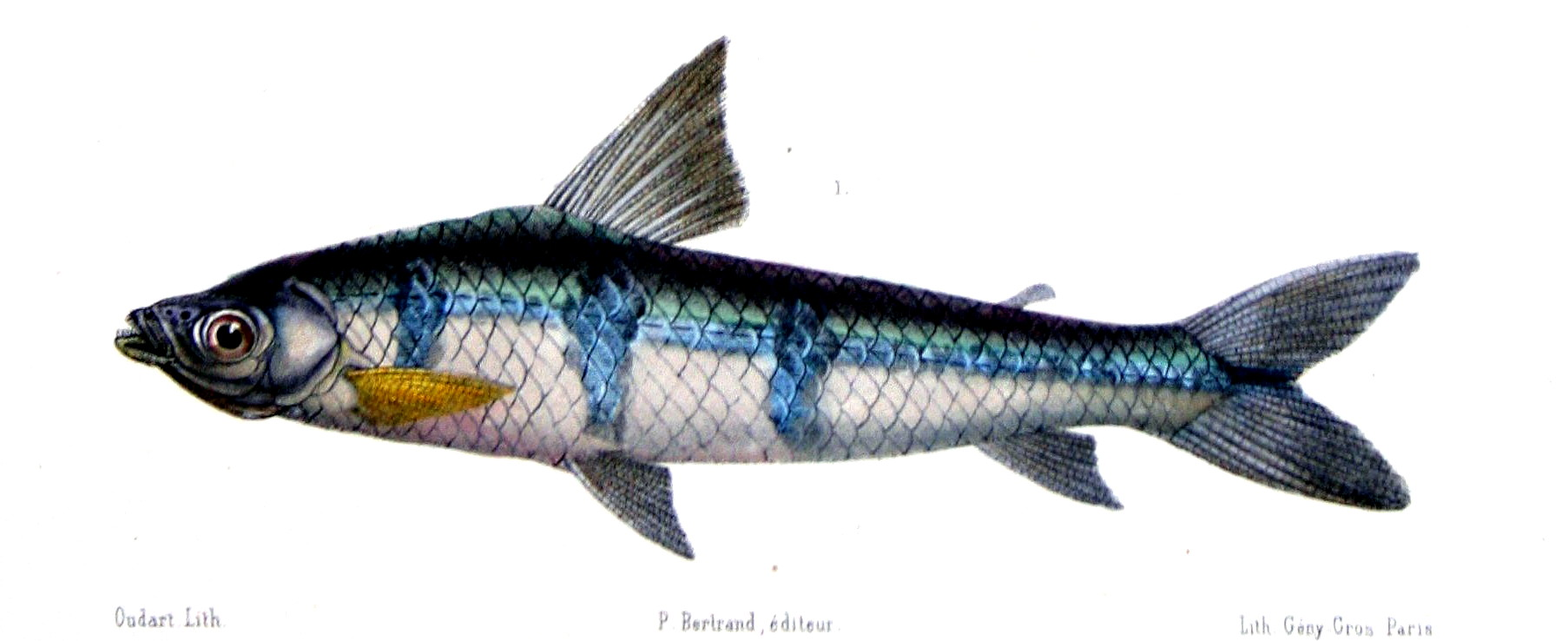
Schizodon vittatus

== Species ==
There are currently 16 described species in this genus.

- Schizodon altoparanae Garavello & Britski, 1990
- Schizodon australis Garavello, 1994
- Schizodon borellii (Boulenger, 1900)
- Schizodon corti L. P. Schultz, 1944
- Schizodon dissimilis (Garman, 1890)
- Schizodon fasciatus Spix & Agassiz, 1829
- Schizodon intermedius Garavello & Britski, 1990
- Schizodon isognathus Kner, 1858
- Schizodon jacuiensis Bergmann, 1988
- Schizodon knerii (Steindachner, 1875)
- Schizodon nasutus Kner, 1858
- Schizodon platae (Garman, 1890)
- Schizodon rostratus (Borodin, 1931)
- Schizodon scotorhabdotus Sidlauskas, Garavello & Jellen, 2007
- Schizodon succinctus Burmeister, 1861
- Schizodon vittatus (Valenciennes, 1850)
