= Schizodon knerii =

Conservation status
- Least Concern (IUCN 3.1)

Scientific classification
- Kingdom: Animalia
- Phylum: Chordata
- Class: Actinopterygii
- Order: Characiformes
- Family: Anostomidae
- Genus: Schizodon
- Species: S. knerii

Binomial name
- Schizodon knerii (Steindachner, 1875)

Synonyms
- Anastomus knerii Steindachner, 1875

Species of fish

Schizodon knerii is a species of freshwater ray-finned fish belonging to the family Anostomidae, the toothed headstanders. This species is found in South America.

Named in honor of ichthyologist Rudolf Kner (1810-1869), who studied anostomid fishes. Kner was describer Steindachner's teacher and friend.

== Description ==
Schizodon knerii can grow to 23.5 cm (9.3 in) standard length.

== Distribution ==
Schizodon knerii is endemic to the São Francisco River basin, Brazil.
