= Schizodon intermedius =

Conservation status
- Least Concern (IUCN 3.1)

Scientific classification
- Kingdom: Animalia
- Phylum: Chordata
- Class: Actinopterygii
- Order: Characiformes
- Family: Anostomidae
- Genus: Schizodon
- Species: S. intermedius

Binomial name
- Schizodon intermedius Garavello and Britski, 1990

Species of fish

Schizodon intermedius is a species of freshwater ray-finned fish belonging to the family Anostomidae, the toothed headstanders. This species is found in South America.

== Description ==
Max length : 28.7 cm SL male/unsexed.

== Distribution ==
South America: Upper Paraná River basin.
