= Dourado =

Dourado, which means 'golden' in Portuguese, may refer to:

== Names of fish ==
- Dourado (Salminus), a predatory freshwater fish
  - Golden dourado (Salminus brasiliensis)
- Amazonian gilded catfishes (dourada)
  - Brachyplatystoma rousseauxii
  - Zungaro zungaro
- Sparus, Mediterranean sea bream
  - Gilt-head sea bream (dorade)

== Other uses ==
- Dourado (grape), another name for the Portuguese wine grape Loureira
- Dourado, São Paulo, Brazil
- Henrique Dourado (born 1989), Brazilian football player
- The nickname of the Brazilian football team Gold Cuiabá Esporte Clube
- Dourados, Mato Grosso do Sul, Brazil

== See also ==
- Dorado (disambiguation)
