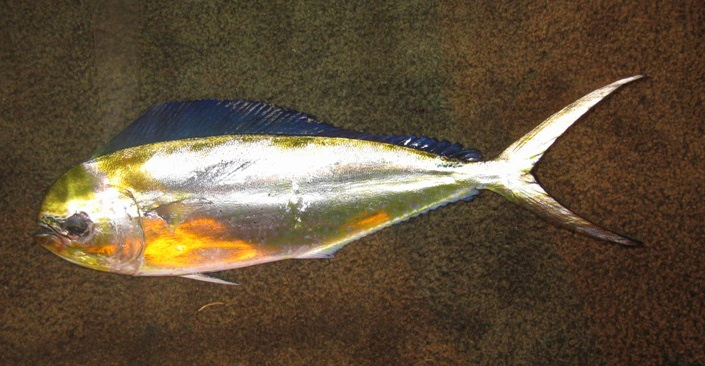

Conservation status
- Least Concern (IUCN 3.1)

Scientific classification
- Kingdom: Animalia
- Phylum: Chordata
- Class: Actinopterygii
- Division: Teleostei
- Order: Carangiformes
- Suborder: Carangoidei
- Family: Coryphaenidae
- Genus: Coryphaena
- Species: C. equiselis

Binomial name
- Coryphaena equiselis Linnaeus, 1758

Synonyms
- Coryphaena equisetis Osbeck, 1765 (Ambiguous name); Coryphaena aurata Rafinesque, 1810; Coryphaena azorica Valenciennes, 1833; Lampugus neapolitanus Valenciennes, 1833; Coryphaena lessonii Valenciennes, 1833; Lampugus punctulatus Valenciennes, 1833

= Pompano dolphinfish =

Species of fish

The pompano dolphinfish (Coryphaena equiselis) is a species of surface-dwelling ray-finned fish found in tropical and subtropical waters. They are one of only two members of the family Coryphaenidae, the other being the mahi-mahi or common dolphinfish.

Pompano dolphinfish have a lifespan of three to four years. They are often mistaken for juvenile mahi-mahi; they are somewhat smaller than the related mahi-mahi, only reaching a maximum total length of 127 cm (50 in). Pompano dolphinfish have compressed heads and dorsal fins extending the entire length of their bodies. Mature males develop a protruding forehead, but not to the same extent as male mahi-mahi. Their backs are a brilliant blue-green, and their sides are a silvery-golden color. When they are removed from the water, the fish fade to a muted green-grey upon death.

Despite the similar names, this fish is not related to the marine mammals also known as dolphins (family Delphinidae). See Coryphaena for the possible etymologies of "dolphinfish".

Pompano dolphinfish are carnivorous, feeding primarily on small fish and squid.

Pompano dolphinfish are popular as a game fish in the waters off South America, and are sometimes eaten as a substitute for swordfish because of their firm texture and sweet flavour.
