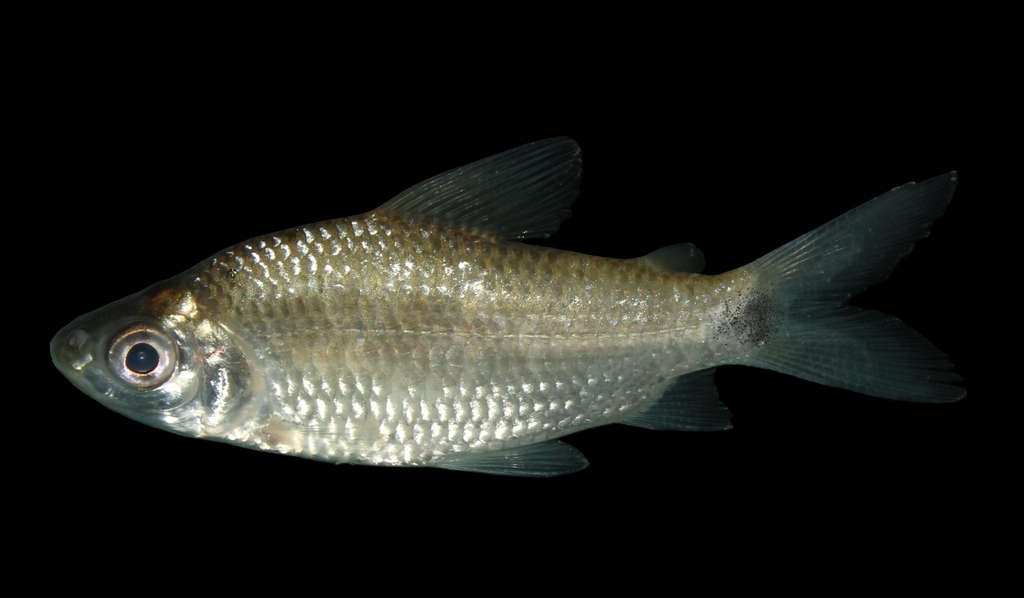
- Curimatella dorsalis

Scientific classification
- Kingdom: Animalia
- Phylum: Chordata
- Class: Actinopterygii
- Order: Characiformes
- Family: Curimatidae
- Genus: Curimatella; C. H. Eigenmann & R. S. Eigenmann, 18897

Type species
- Curimatus lepidurus C. H. Eigenmann & R.S. Eigenmann, 1889

Synonyms
- Apolinarella Fernández-Yépez, 1948; Lepipinna Fernández-Yépez, 1948; Walbaunina Fernández-Yépez, 1948

= Curimatella =

Genus of fishes

Curimatella is a genus of freshwater ray-finned fishes belonging to the family Curimatidae, toothless characins. The fishes in this genus are found in South America.

== Species ==
Curimatella contains the following valid species:

- Curimatella alburna (J. P. Müller & Troschel, 1844)
- Curimatella dorsalis (C. H. Eigenmann & R. S. Eigenmann, 1889)
- Curimatella immaculata (Fernández-Yépez, 1948)
- Curimatella lepidura (C. H. Eigenmann & R. S. Eigenmann, 1889)
- Curimatella meyeri (Steindachner, 1882)
