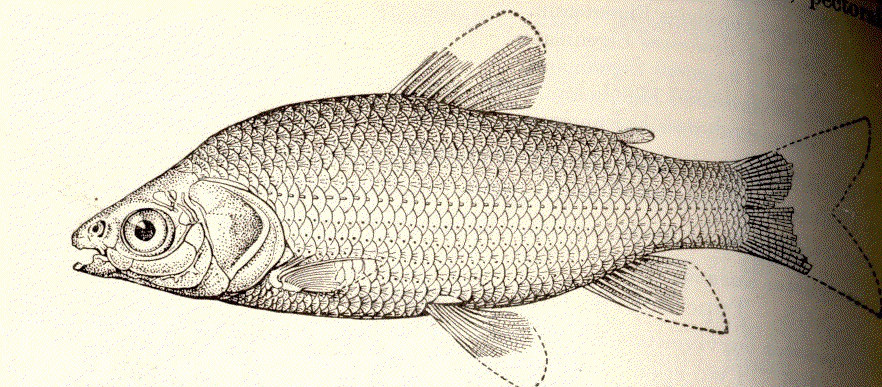
- Pseudocurimata troschelii

Scientific classification
- Kingdom: Animalia
- Phylum: Chordata
- Class: Actinopterygii
- Order: Characiformes
- Family: Curimatidae
- Genus: Pseudocurimata; Fernández-Yépez, 1948

Type species
- Curimatus lineopunctatus Boulenger, 1911

= Pseudocurimata =

Genus of fishes

Pseudocurimata is a genus of freshwater ray-finned fishes belonging to the family Curimatidae, the toothless characins. The fishes in this genus are found in tropical South America.

== Species ==
Pseudocurimata contains the following vaid species:

- Pseudocurimata boehlkei Vari, 1989
- Pseudocurimata boulengeri (C. H. Eigenmann, 1907)
- Pseudocurimata lineopunctata (Boulenger, 1911)
- Pseudocurimata patiae (C. H. Eigenmann, 1914)
- Pseudocurimata peruana (C. H. Eigenmann, 1922)
- Pseudocurimata troschelii (Günther, 1860)
