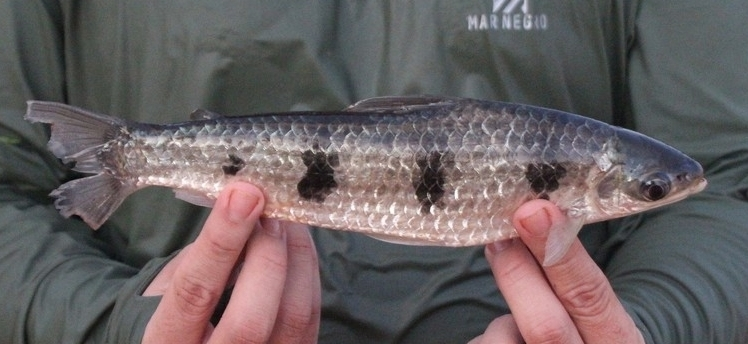

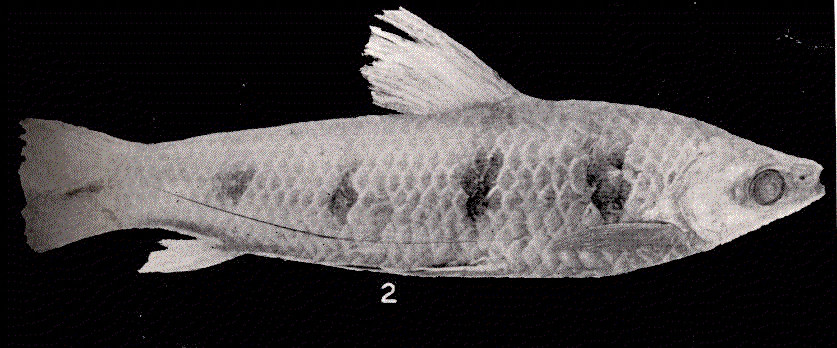

Conservation status
- Least Concern (IUCN 3.1)

Scientific classification
- Kingdom: Animalia
- Phylum: Chordata
- Class: Actinopterygii
- Order: Characiformes
- Family: Anostomidae
- Genus: Schizodon
- Species: S. borellii

Binomial name
- Schizodon borellii (Boulenger, 1900)

Synonyms
- Anostomus borellii Boulenger, 1900; Leporinus platycephalus Meinken, 1935

= Schizodon borellii =

Species of fish

Schizodon borellii is a species of freshwater ray-finned fish belonging to the family Anostomidae, the toothed headstanders. This species is found in South America.

The fish is named in honor of zoologist Alfonso Borelli (1857-1943), Università di Torino. Borelli led three expeditions into the interior of South America and collected the type specimen of this species along with many other animals.

== Description ==
Schizodon borellii can grow to 40 cm (16 in) standard length.

== Distribution ==
It is found in the Paraguay River basin in Argentina and Brazil.
