= Steindachnerina =

Scientific classification
- Kingdom: Animalia
- Phylum: Chordata
- Class: Actinopterygii
- Order: Characiformes
- Family: Curimatidae
- Genus: Steindachnerina; Fowler, 1906

Type species
- Curimatus trachystethus Cope, 1878

Synonyms
- Cruxentina Fernández-Yépez, 1948; Curimatorbis Fernández-Yépez, 1948; Rivasella Fernández-Yépez, 1948

Genus of fishes

Steindachnerina is a genus of freshwater ray-finned fishes belonging to the family Curimatidae, the toothless characins. The fishes in this genus are found in South America.

== Species ==
Steindachnerina contains the following vaid species:

- Steindachnerina amazonica (Steindachner, 1911)
- Steindachnerina argentea (T. N. Gill, 1858) (stout sardine)
- Steindachnerina atratoensis (C. H. Eigenmann, 1912)
- Steindachnerina bimaculata (Steindachner, 1876)
- Steindachnerina binotata (N. E. Pearson, 1924)
- Steindachnerina biornata (Braga & Azpelicueta, 1987)
- Steindachnerina brevipinna (C. H. Eigenmann & R. S. Eigenmann, 1889)
- Steindachnerina conspersa (Holmberg, 1891)
- Steindachnerina corumbae Pavanelli & Britski, 1999
- Steindachnerina dobula (Günther, 1868)
- Steindachnerina elegans (Steindachner, 1875)
- Steindachnerina fasciata (Vari & Géry, 1985)
- Steindachnerina gracilis Vari & Williams Vari, 1989
- Steindachnerina guentheri (C. H. Eigenmann & R. S. Eigenmann, 1889)
- Steindachnerina hypostoma (Boulenger, 1887)
- Steindachnerina insculpta (Fernández-Yépez, 1948)
- Steindachnerina leucisca (Günther, 1868)
- Steindachnerina notograptos Lucinda & Vari, 2009
- Steindachnerina notonota (A. Miranda-Ribeiro, 1937)
- Steindachnerina planiventris Vari & Williams Vari, 1989
- Steindachnerina pupula Vari, 1991
- Steindachnerina quasimodoi Vari & Williams Vari, 1989
- Steindachnerina seriata Netto-Ferreira & Vari, 2011
- Steindachnerina varii Géry, Planquette & Le Bail, 1991
