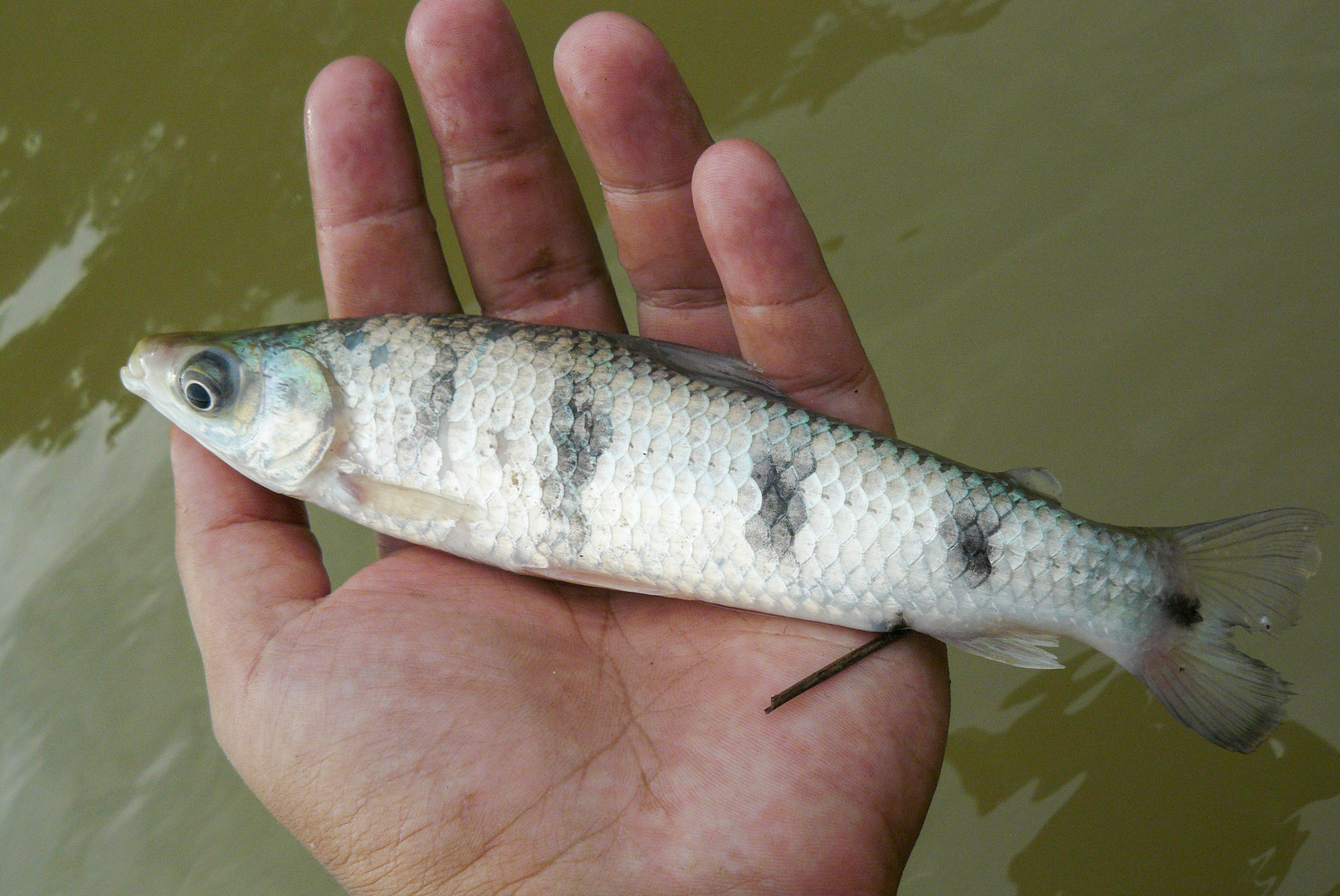
- In Brazil
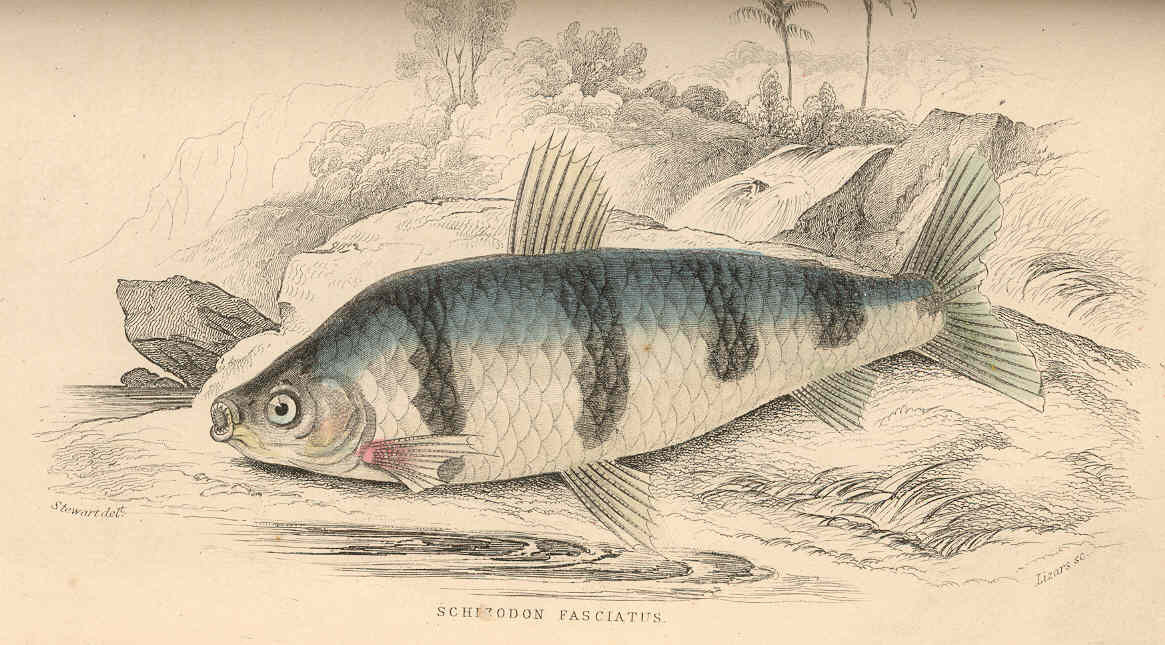
- 1852 illustration

Conservation status
- Least Concern (IUCN 3.1)

Scientific classification
- Kingdom: Animalia
- Phylum: Chordata
- Class: Actinopterygii
- Order: Characiformes
- Family: Anostomidae
- Genus: Schizodon
- Species: S. fasciatus

Binomial name
- Schizodon fasciatus Spix and Agassiz, 1829

Synonyms
- Piabuca schizodon Valenciennes, 1850

= Schizodon fasciatus =

Species of fish

Schizodon fasciatus is a species of freshwater ray-finned fish belonging to the family Anostomidae, the toothed headstanders. This species is found in South America.

== Description ==
It has a maximum length of 40.0 cm TL male/unsexed.

== Distribution ==
South America: upper Amazon River and French Guiana coastal basins.
