= Dorada (game) =

Board game

Dorada is a board game published by Ravensburger in 1988.

== Gameplay ==
Dorada is an abstract children's game.

== Reviews ==
- Jeux & Stratégie #51
- Games #92
