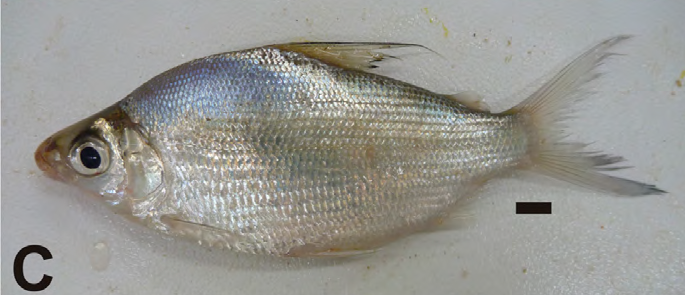
- Psectrogaster amazonica (scale bar = 1 cm)

Scientific classification
- Kingdom: Animalia
- Phylum: Chordata
- Class: Actinopterygii
- Order: Characiformes
- Family: Curimatidae
- Genus: Psectrogaster; C. H. Eigenmann & R. S. Eigenmann, 1889

Type species
- Psectrogaster rhomboides C. H. Eigenmann & R. S. Eigenmann, 1889

Synonyms
- Hamatichthys Fernández-Yépez, 1948; Pseudopsectrogaster Fernández-Yépez, 1948; Semelcarinata Fernández-Yépez, 1948

= Psectrogaster =

Genus of fishes

Psectrogaster is a genus of freshwater ray-finned fishes belonging to the family Curimatidae, the toothless characins. The fishes in this genus are found in tropical South America.

== Species ==
Psectrogaster contains the following vaid species:

- Psectrogaster amazonica C. H. Eigenmann & R. S. Eigenmann, 1889
- Psectrogaster ciliata (J. P. Müller & Troschel, 1844)
- Psectrogaster curviventris C. H. Eigenmann & C. H. Kennedy, 1903
- Psectrogaster essequibensis (Günther, 1864)
- Psectrogaster falcata (C. H. Eigenmann & R. S. Eigenmann, 1889)
- Psectrogaster rhomboides C. H. Eigenmann & R. S. Eigenmann, 1889
- Psectrogaster rutiloides (Kner, 1858)
- Psectrogaster saguiru (Fowler, 1941)
