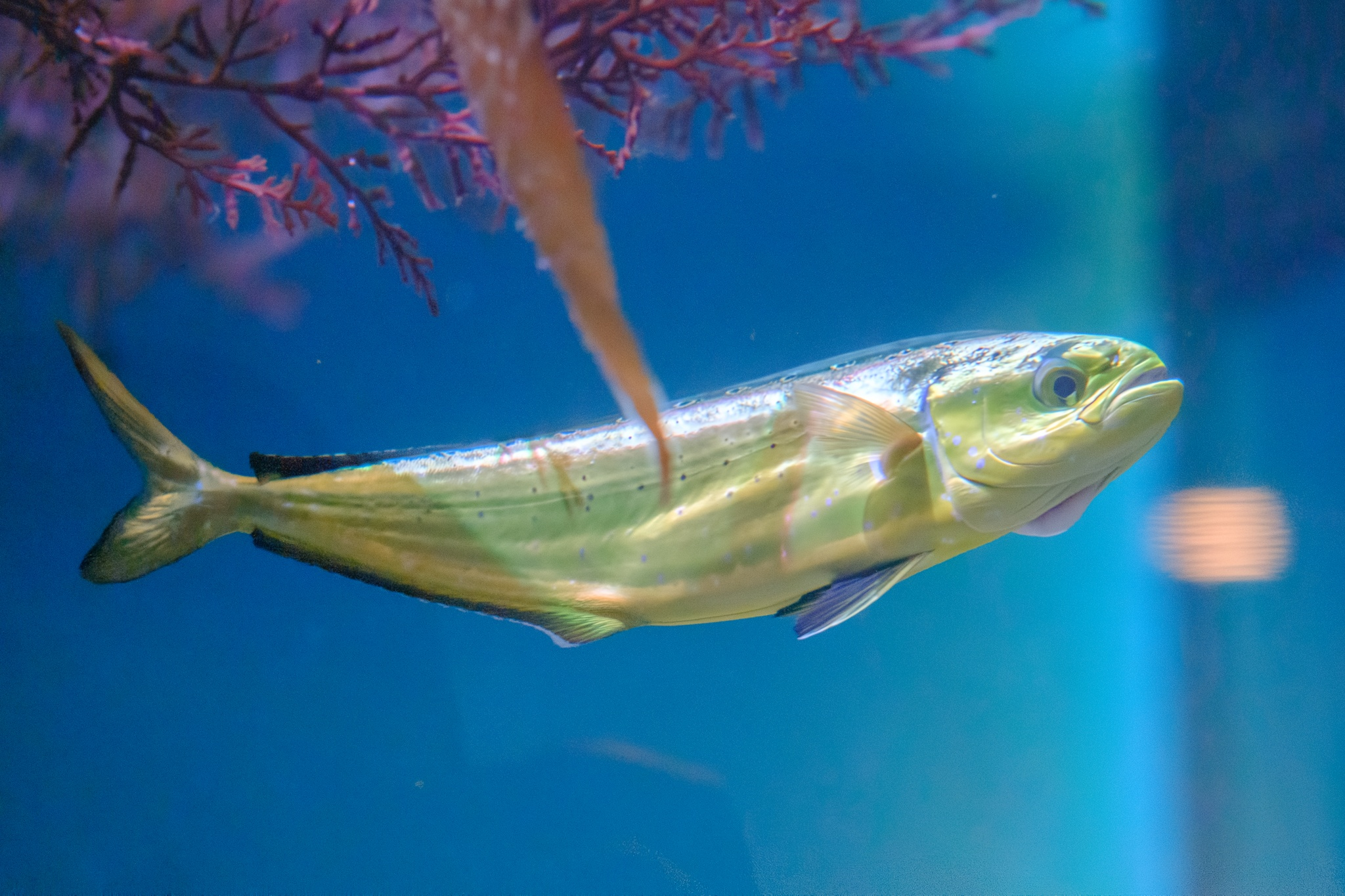
- Young mahi-mahi at Monterey Bay Aquarium Research Institute

Conservation status
- Least Concern (IUCN 3.1)

Scientific classification
- Kingdom: Animalia
- Phylum: Chordata
- Class: Actinopterygii
- Division: Teleostei
- Order: Carangiformes
- Suborder: Carangoidei
- Family: Coryphaenidae
- Genus: Coryphaena
- Species: C. hippurus

Binomial name
- Coryphaena hippurus (Linnaeus, 1758)

Synonyms
- List: Scomber pelagicus (Linnaeus, 1758); Coryphaena fasciolata (Pallas, 1770); Coryphaena chrysurus (Lacépède, 1801); Coryphaena imperialis (Rafinesque, 1810); Lepimphis hippuroides (Rafinesque, 1810); Coryphaena immaculata Agassiz, 1831; Lampugus siculus Valenciennes, 1833; Coryphaena scomberoides Valenciennes, 1833; Coryphaena margravii Valenciennes, 1833; Coryphaena suerii Valenciennes, 1833; Coryphaena dorado Valenciennes, 1833; Coryphaena dolfyn Valenciennes, 1833; Coryphaena virgata Valenciennes, 1833; Coryphaena argyrurus Valenciennes, 1833; Coryphaena vlamingii Valenciennes, 1833; Coryphaena nortoniana R. T. Lowe, 1839; Coryphaena japonica Temminck & Schlegel, 1845

= Mahi-mahi =

Species of fish

The mahi-mahi (/ˌmɑːhiˈmɑːhi/ MAH-hee-MAH-hee), common dolphinfish, dolphinfish, dolphin or dorado (Coryphaena hippurus) is a surface-dwelling ray-finned fish found in off-shore temperate, tropical, and subtropical waters worldwide. It is one of two members of the family Coryphaenidae, the other being the pompano dolphinfish. These fish are most commonly found in the waters around the Gulf of Mexico, Costa Rica, Hawaii, and the Indian Ocean. In Italy it is called corifena, lampuga or pesce capone, and has even given its name to the caponata though eggplant has now taken the place of the fish.

== Nomenclature ==
The name mahi-mahi comes from the Hawaiian language and means 'very strong', through the process of reduplication. Though the species is also referred to as the common dolphinfish, they are not related to dolphins; the origin of the name "dolphinfish" is recent and was given to avoid confusion with dolphins, as the traditional name of the fish was also "dolphin". See Coryphaena for the possible etymologies of dolphinfish. In parts of the Pacific and along the English-speaking coast of South Africa, the mahi-mahi is commonly referred to by its name in Spanish, dorado.

Linnaeus named the genus, derived from the Greek word, κορυφή, koryphe, meaning 'top' or 'apex', in 1758. Synonyms for the species include Coryphaena argyrurus, Coryphaena chrysurus, and Coryphaena dolfyn.

== Description ==
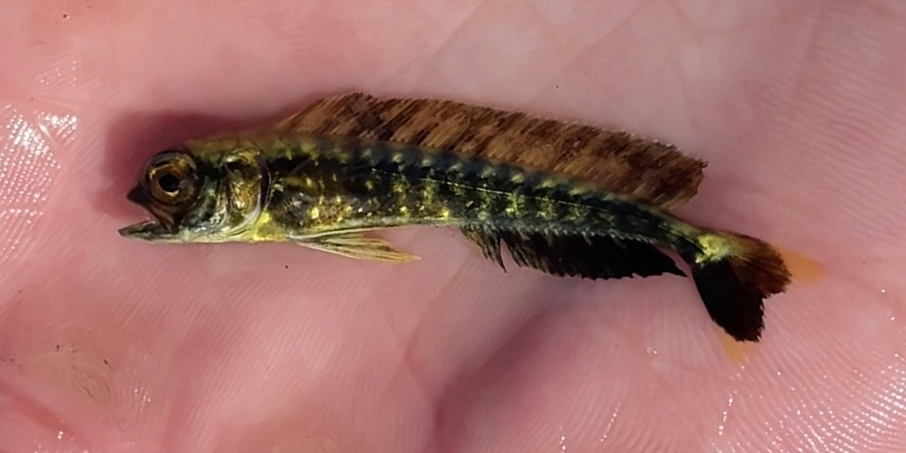
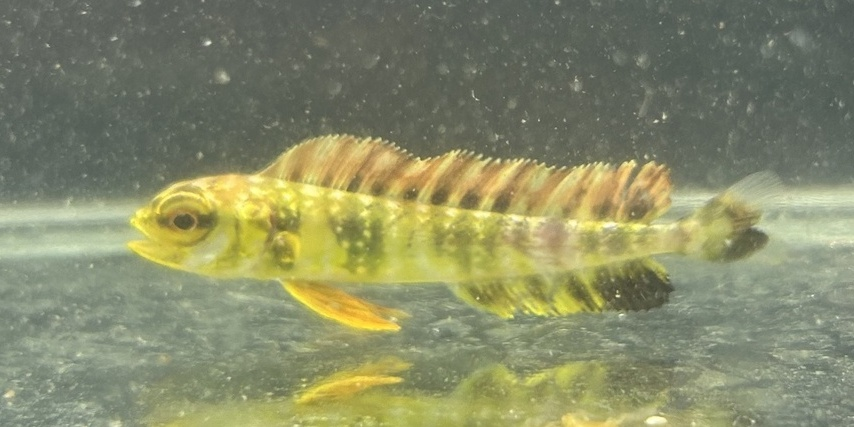
Small juvenile mahi-mahi

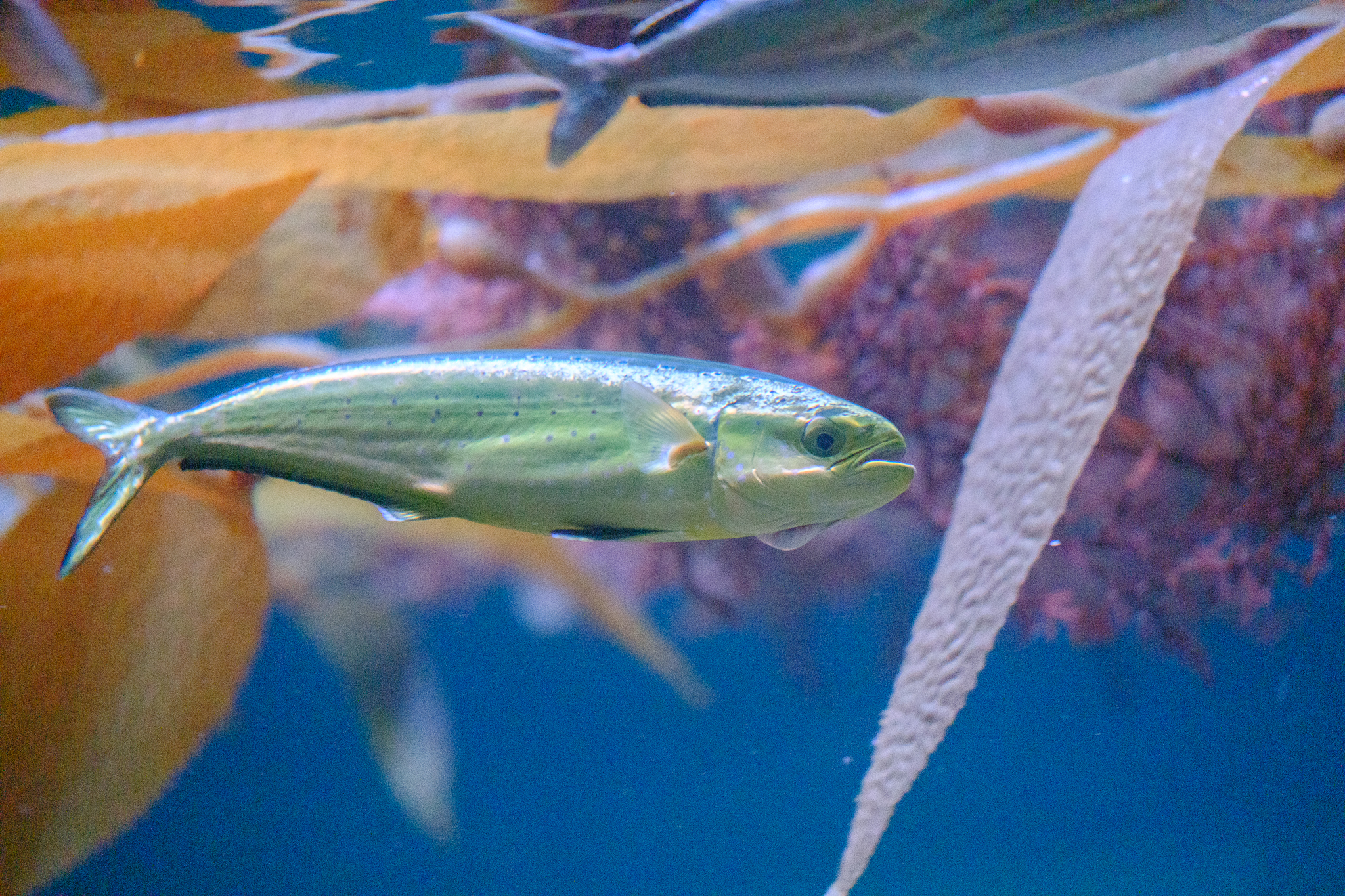
Young mahi-mahi reared by the Monterey Bay Aquarium Research Institute

Mahi-mahi have compressed bodies and one very long dorsal fin extending from the head almost to the tail fin. Mature males have distinctive "foreheads"; it grows as the fish matures and often protrudes well above the body proper, which is streamlined by the musculature of the back. This "hump" is a sexually dimorphic feature; females have a rounded head. Their caudal fins and anal fins are sharply concave. They are distinguished by dazzling colors – golden on the sides, and bright blues and greens on the sides and back. The pectoral fins of the mahi-mahi are iridescent blue. The flank is broad and golden.

Out of the water, the fish often change color (giving rise to their Spanish name, dorado, 'golden'), going through several hues before finally fading to a muted yellow-grey upon death.

== Biology ==
Mahi-mahi can live for up to five years, although they seldom exceed four. Females are usually smaller than males. Catches typically are 7 to 13 kg (15 to 29 lb) and a meter (3 ft) in length. They rarely exceed 15 kg (33 lb), and mahi-mahi over 18 kg (40 lb) are exceptional. Mahi-mahi are among the fastest-growing of fish. They spawn in warm ocean currents throughout much of the year, and their young are commonly found in rafts of Sargassum weeds. Young mahi-mahi migrate past Malta where they are called lampuki and Sicily where they are known as lampuga or capone; there they are fished using nets and floating mats of palm leaves under which they collect.

== Reproduction ==
Males and females are sexually mature in their first year, usually by the age of 4–5 months. Spawning can occur at body lengths of 20 cm (7.9 in). Females may spawn two to three times per year, and produce between 80,000 and 1,000,000 eggs per event. In waters at 28 °C (82 °F), mahi-mahi larvae are found year-round, with greater numbers detected in spring and fall. Mahi-mahi fish are mostly found in the surface water. Their flesh is grey-white when raw, cooking to an attractive white with a clean, non-fishy flavour.

== Diet ==
Mahi-mahi are carnivorous, feeding on small, pelagic bony fish (such as flying fish, man-o-war fish, sargassum fish, and triggerfish), pelagic larvae of benthic bony fish (such as flying gurnards, triggerfish, pufferfish, and grunts), crabs, other crustaceans, squid, other epipelagic cephalopods, scyphozoans, and juveniles of large, teleost forage fish such as tuna, billfish, jack, mackerel, and other mahi-mahi. They have also been known to eat zooplankton. To pursue such varied pelagic prey, mahi-mahi are fast swimmers, swimming as fast as 50 knots (92.6 km/h; 57.5 mph).

== Relation to humans ==
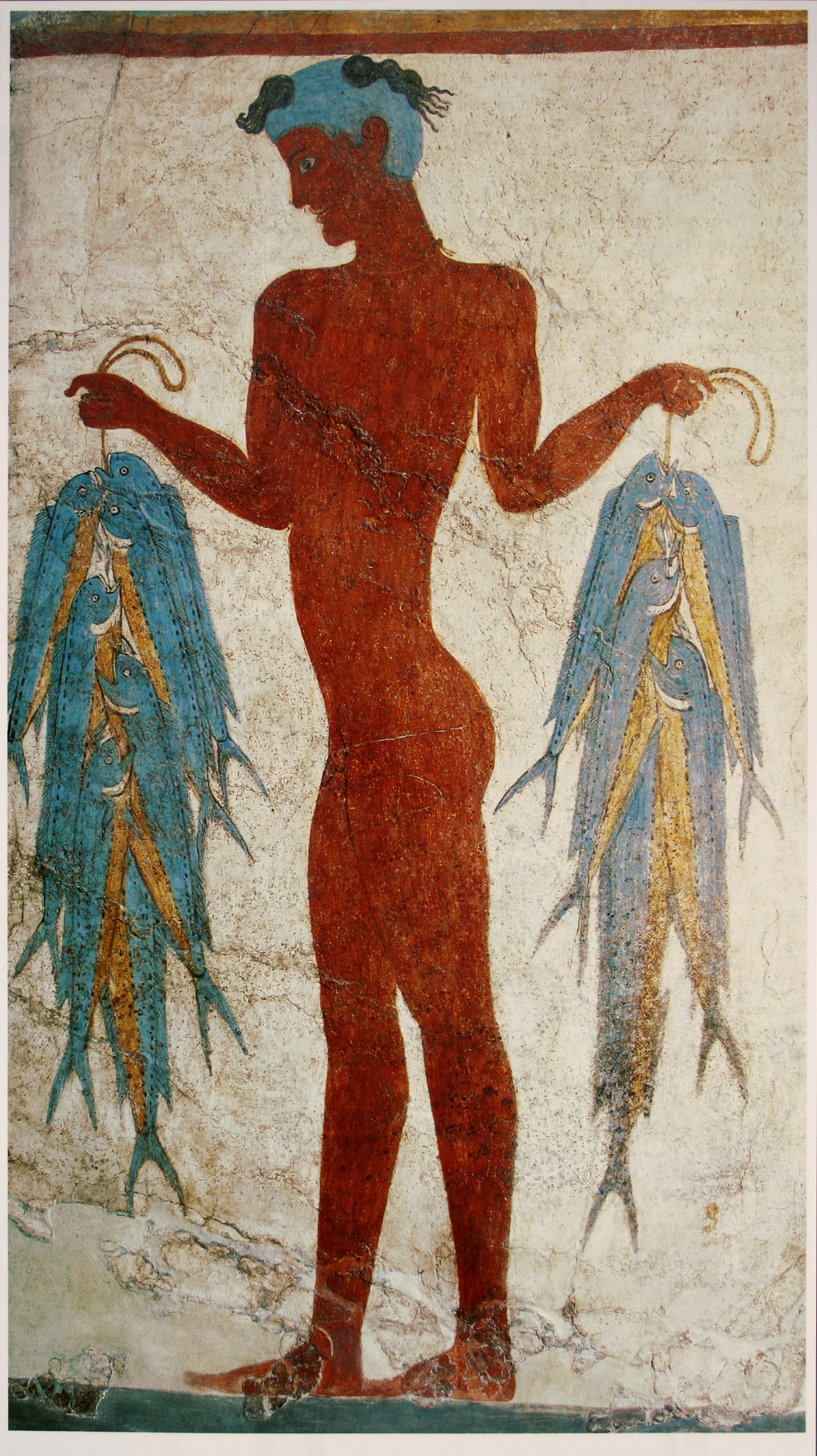
Young fisherman with dolphinfish from Santorini, Greece, c. 1600 BCE (Minoan civilization)

=== Fishing ===
==== Recreational fishing ====
Mahi-mahi are highly sought for sport fishing and commercial purposes. Sport fishermen seek them due to their beauty, size, food quality, and healthy population. Mahi-mahi can be found in the Caribbean Sea, on the west coast of North and South America, the Pacific coast of Costa Rica, the Gulf of Mexico, the Atlantic coast of Florida and West Africa, Indian Ocean, Bay of Bengal, South China Sea and Southeast Asia, Hawaii, Tahiti, and many other places worldwide.

Fishing charters most often look for floating debris and frigatebirds near the edge of the reef in about 120 feet (37 m) of water. Mahi-mahi (and many other fish) often swim near debris such as floating wood, five-gallon bucket lids, palm trees and fronds, or sargasso weed lines and around fish buoys. Frigatebirds search for food accompanying the debris or sargasso. Experienced fishing guides can tell what species are likely around the debris by the birds' behavior.

30-to-50-pound (14 to 23 kg) gear is more than adequate when trolling for mahi-mahi. Fly-casters may especially seek frigatebirds to find big mahi-mahis, and then use a bait-and-switch technique. Ballyhoo or a net full of live sardines tossed into the water can excite the mahi-mahis into a feeding frenzy. Hookless teaser lures can have the same effect. After tossing the teasers or live chum, fishermen throw the fly to the feeding mahi-mahi. Once on a line, mahi-mahi are fast, flashy, and acrobatic, with beautiful blue, yellow, green, and even red dots of color.

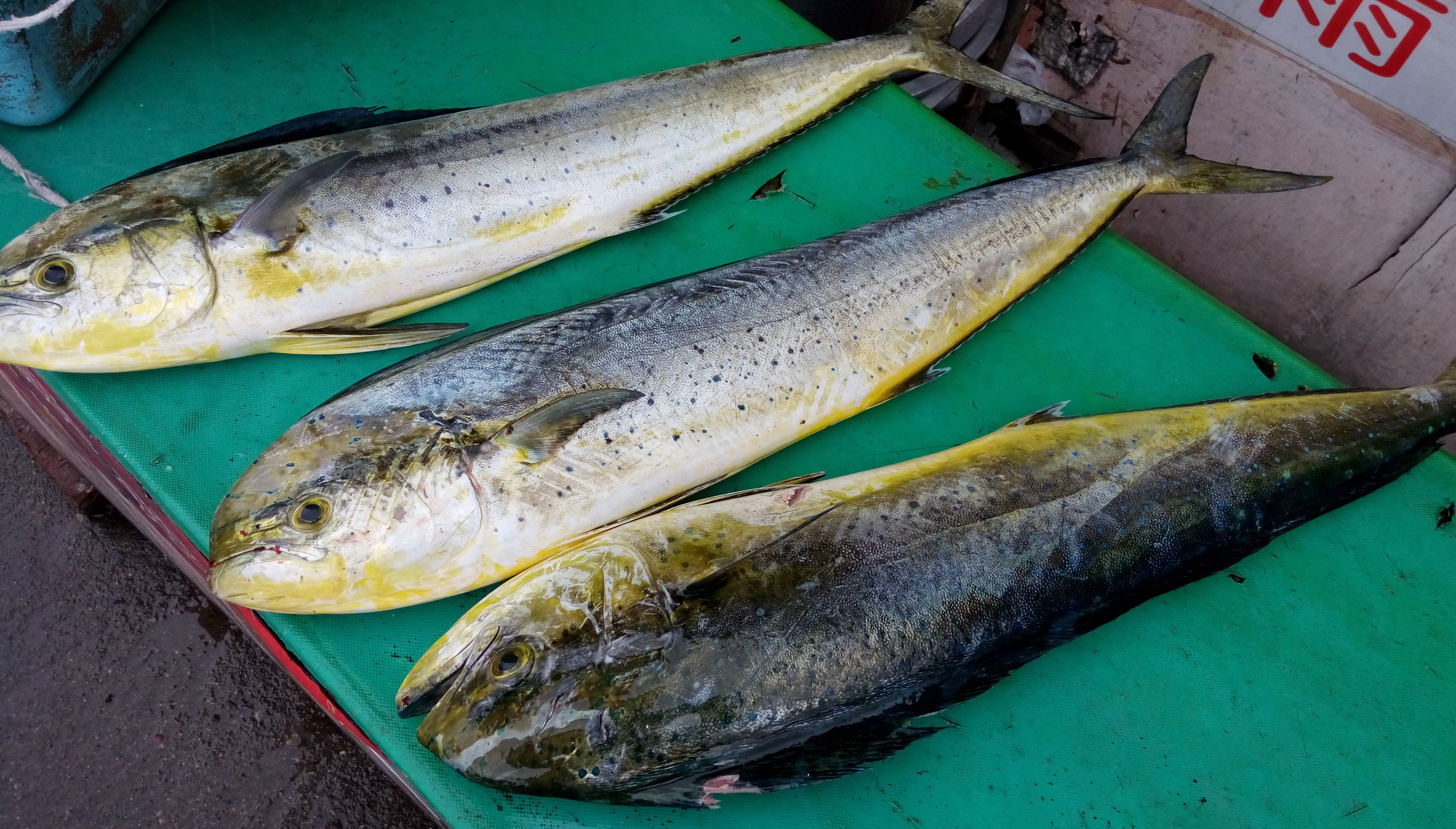
Mahi-mahi in a fish market

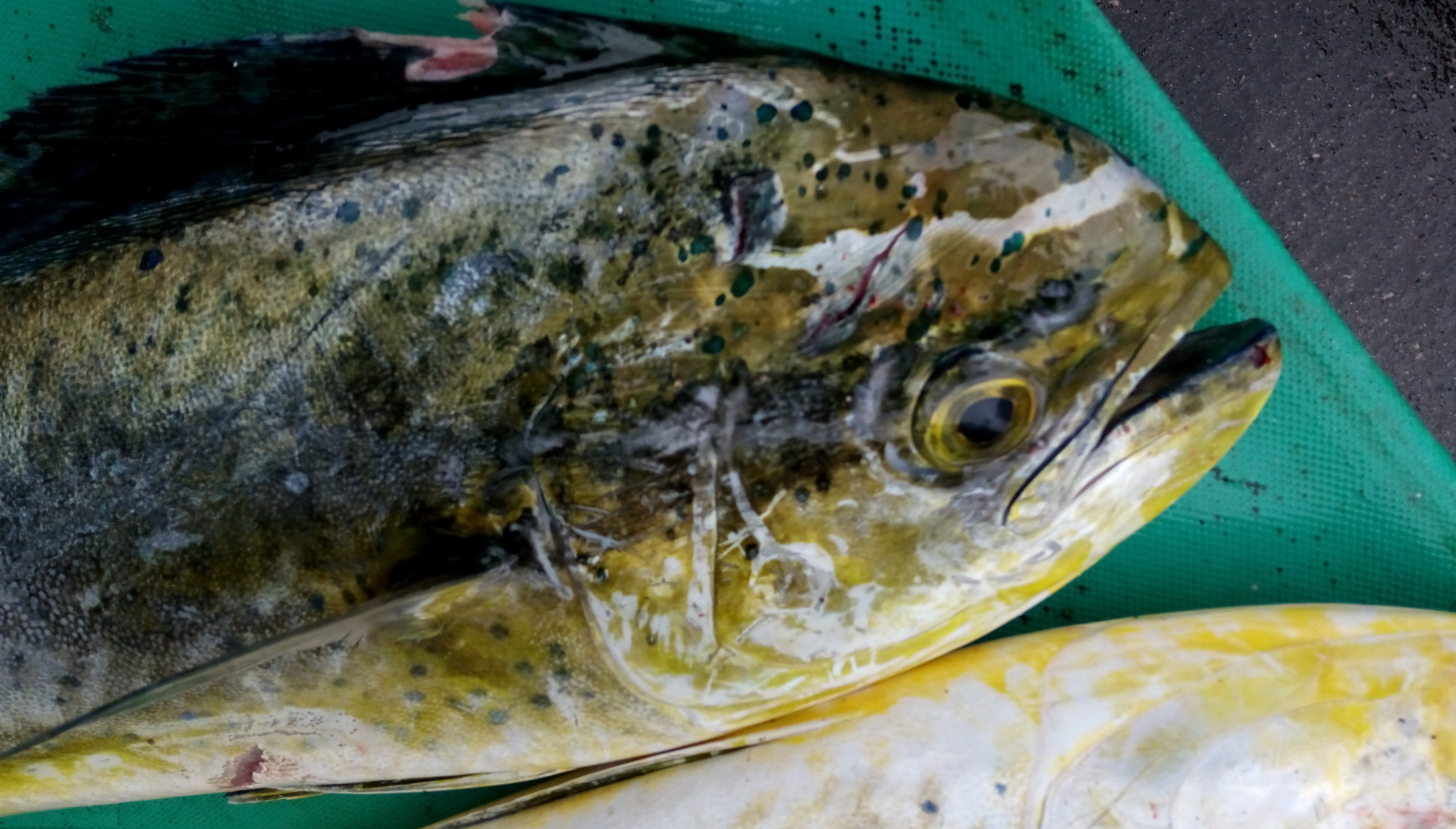
Closeup

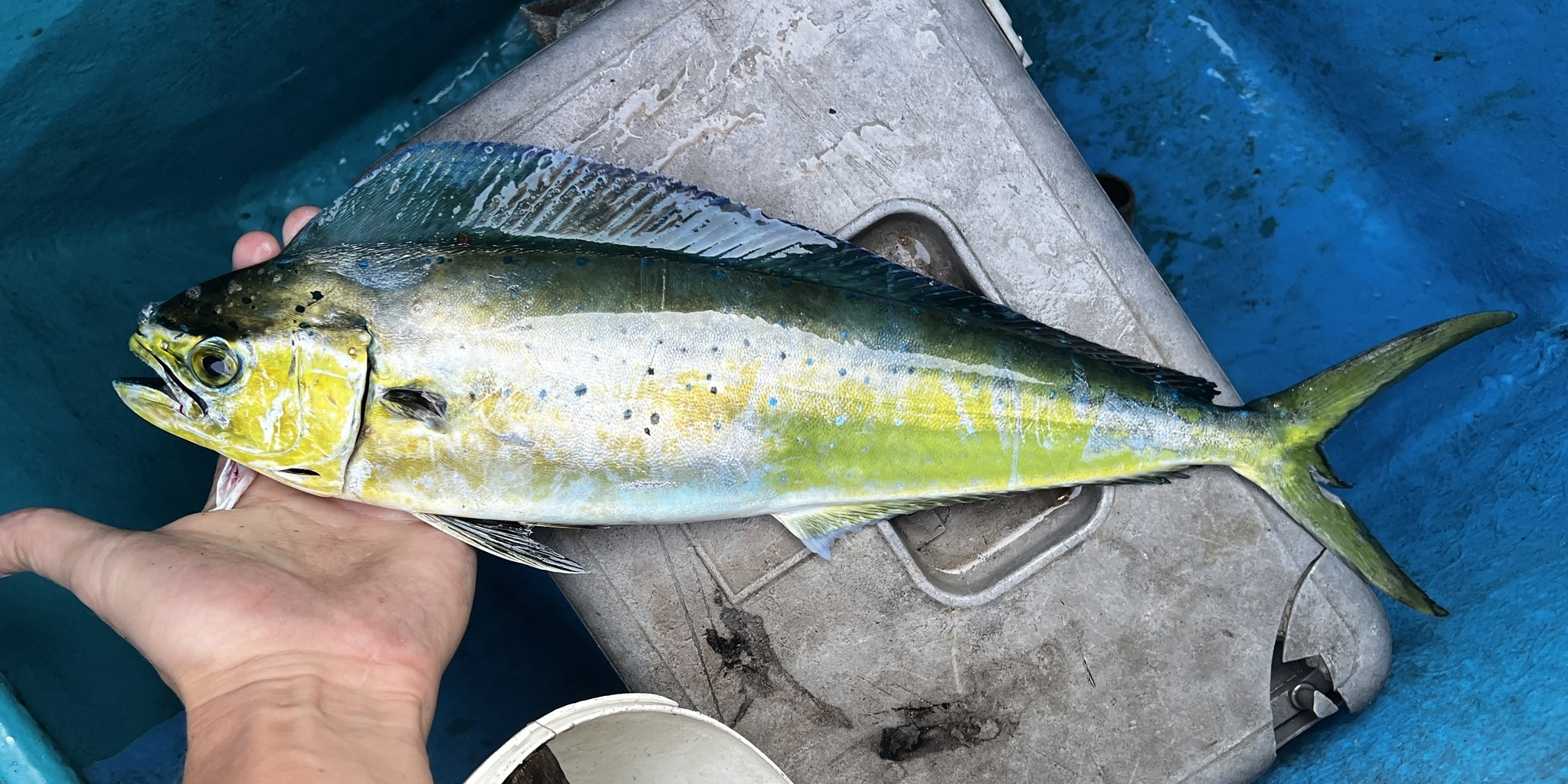
Young mahi-mahi, in Indonesia

==== Commercial fishing ====
Global capture production of Common dolphinfish (Coryphaena hippurus) in thousand tonnes from 1950 to 2022, as reported by the FAO

The United States and the Caribbean countries are the primary consumers of this fish, but many European countries are increasing their consumption every year. It is a popular food fish in Australia, usually caught and sold as a byproduct by tuna and swordfish commercial fishing operators. Japan and Hawaii are significant consumers. The Arabian Sea, particularly the coast of Oman, also has mahi-mahi. At first, mahi-mahi were mostly bycatch in the tuna and swordfish longline fishery. Now, they are sought by commercial fishermen on their own merits.

In French Polynesia, fishermen use harpoons, using a specifically designed boat, the poti marara, to pursue it, because mahi-mahi do not dive. The poti marara is a powerful motorized V-shaped boat, optimized for high agility and speed, and driven with a stick so the pilot can hold his harpoon with his right hand. The method is also practiced by fishermen in the Philippines, especially in the northern province of Batanes, where the harpooning is called pagmamamataw.

=== In astronomy ===
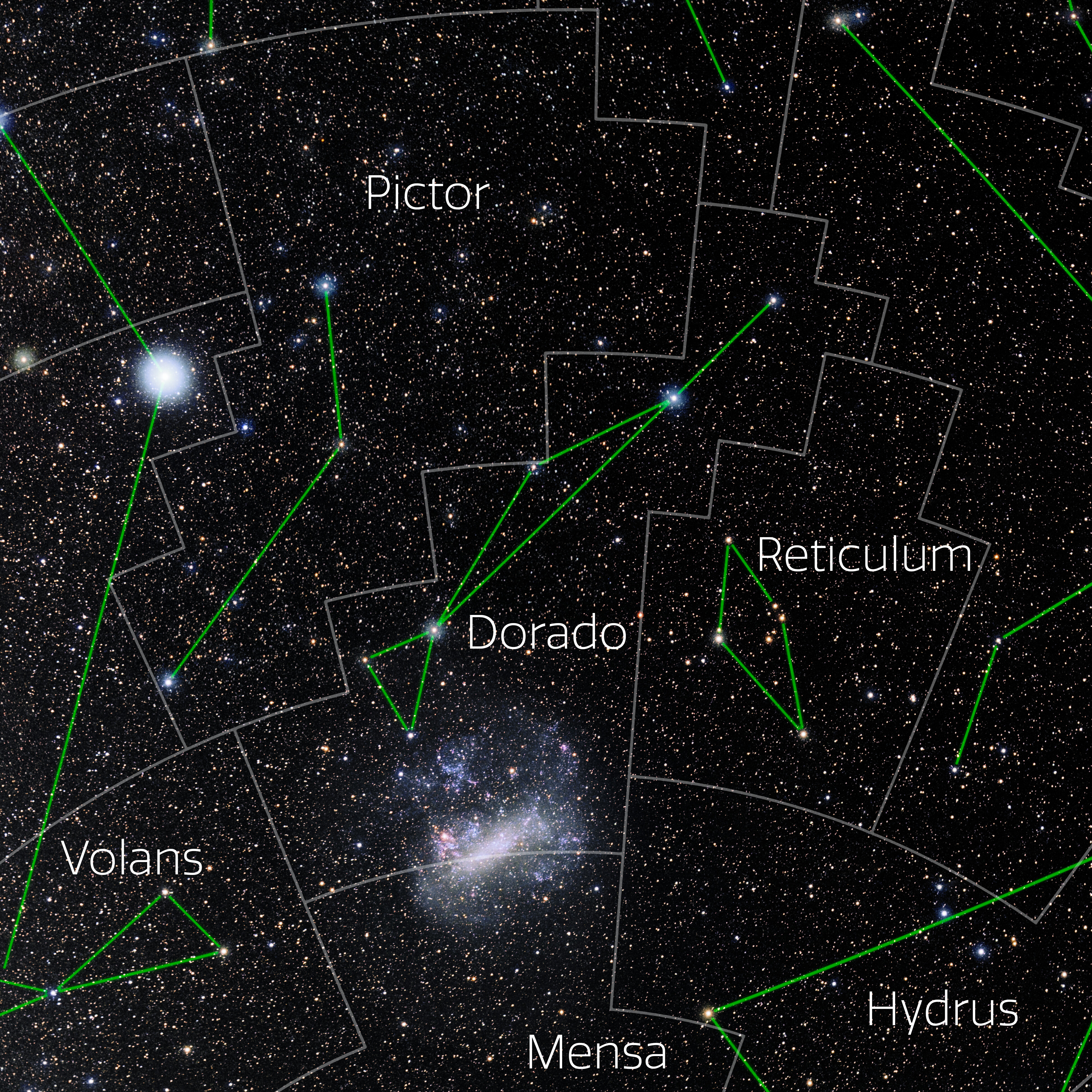
Dorado's position in the sky

The constellation Dorado, created in 1598, is named for the mahi-mahi. It is located near the Large Magellanic Cloud.

=== Environmental and food safety concerns ===
Depending on how it is caught, mahi-mahi is classed differently by various sustainability rating systems:

- The Monterey Bay Aquarium classifies mahi-mahi, when caught in the US Atlantic, as a best choice, the top of its three environmental-impact categories. The aquarium advises to avoid imported mahi-mahi harvested by Longline fishing, but rates troll and pole-and-line caught as a good alternative.
- The Natural Resources Defense Council classifies mahi-mahi as a "moderate mercury" fish (its second-lowest of four categories), and suggests eating six servings or fewer per month.

The mahi-mahi is also a common vector for ciguatera poisoning. Although a very popular food dish in many parts of the world, there have been reports of ciguatera poisoning from human consumption of this fish. Ciguatera poisoning is caused by the accumulation of toxins (ciguatoxins and maitotoxin) in the flesh of the fish over time. These are produced by Gambierdiscus toxicus which grows together with marine algae, which causes fish like the mahi-mahi to consume them by accident.

Mahi-mahi naturally have high levels of histidine, which is converted to histamine when bacterial growth occurs during improper storage or processing. Subsequent cooking, smoking, or freezing does not eliminate the histamine. This leads to a foodborne illness known as scombroid food poisoning, which also affect other fish such as tuna, mackerel, sardine, anchovy, herring, bluefish, amberjack and marlin. Symptoms are those of histamine intolerance and may include flushed skin, headache, itchiness, blurred vision, abdominal cramps, and diarrhea, and the onset of symptoms is typically 10 to 60 minutes after eating and can last for up to two days. Rarely, breathing problems (like that of allergic asthma) or an irregular heartbeat may occur. Diagnosis is typically based on the symptoms and may be supported by a normal blood tryptase.

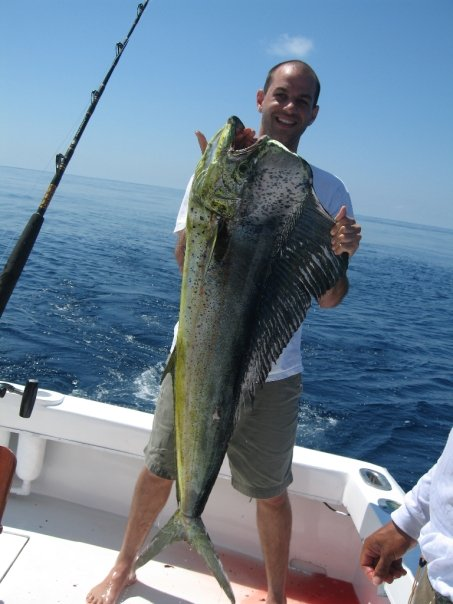
Bull (male) mahi-mahi

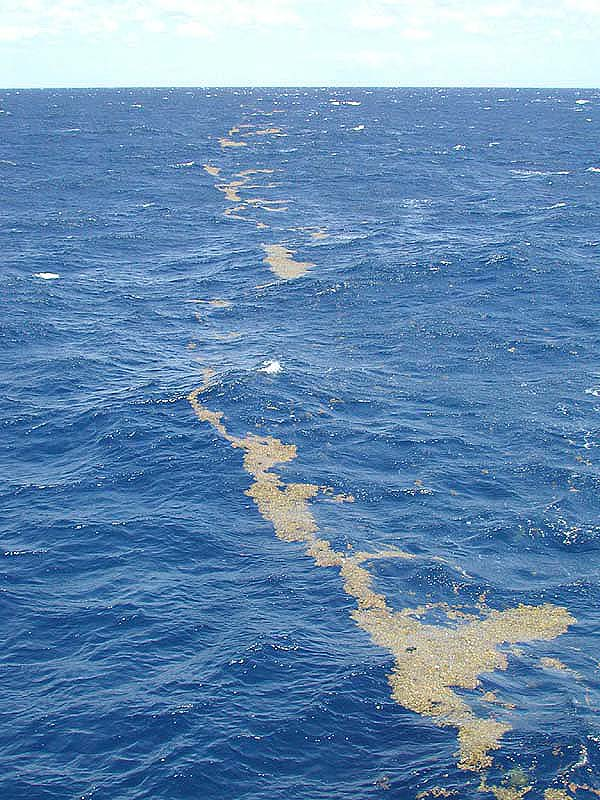
Mahi-mahi are attracted to Sargassum, floating brown algae that serve as both a hiding place and source of food. Lines of this genus can stretch for miles along the ocean surface.

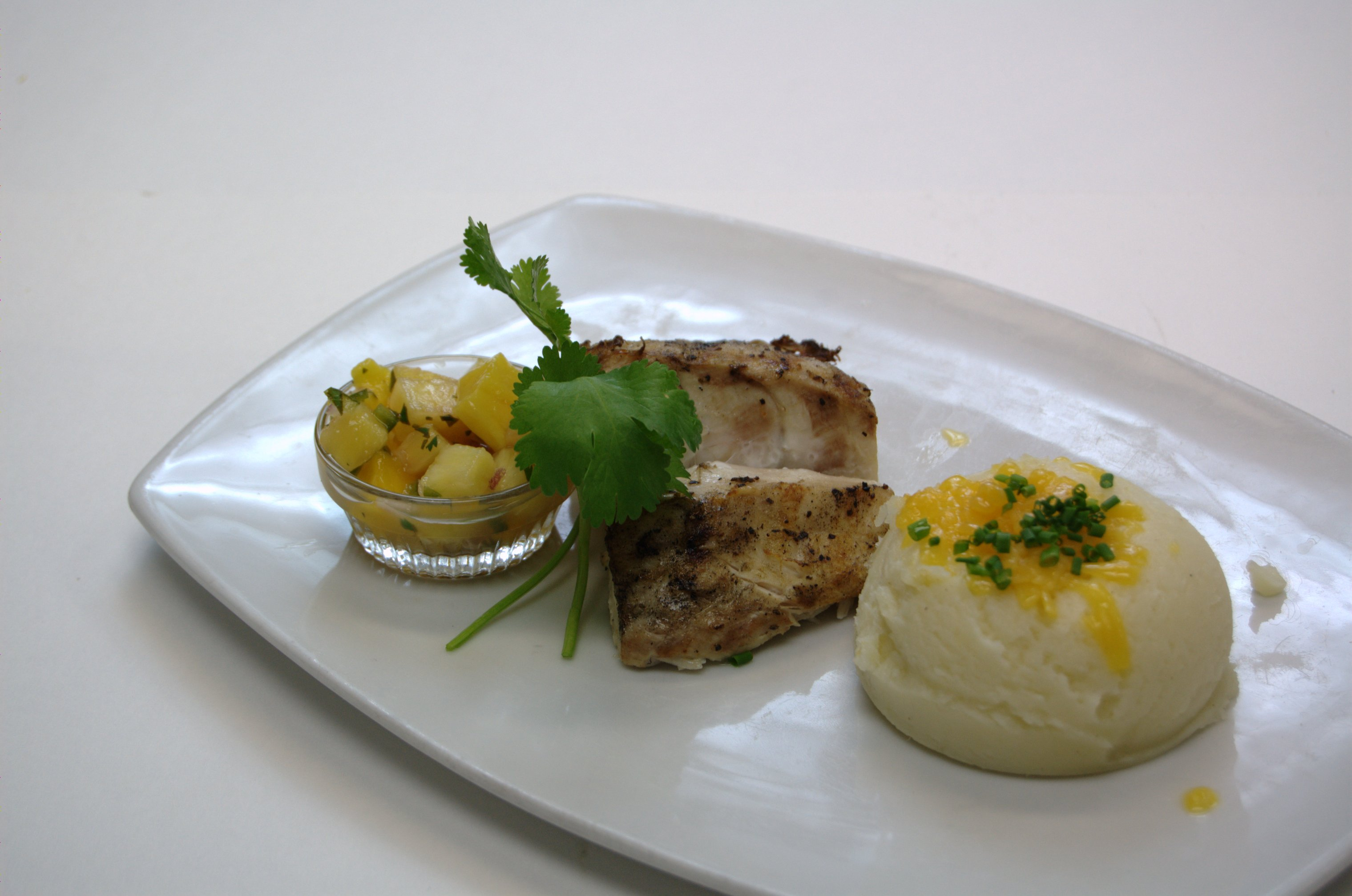
Grilled mahi-mahi
