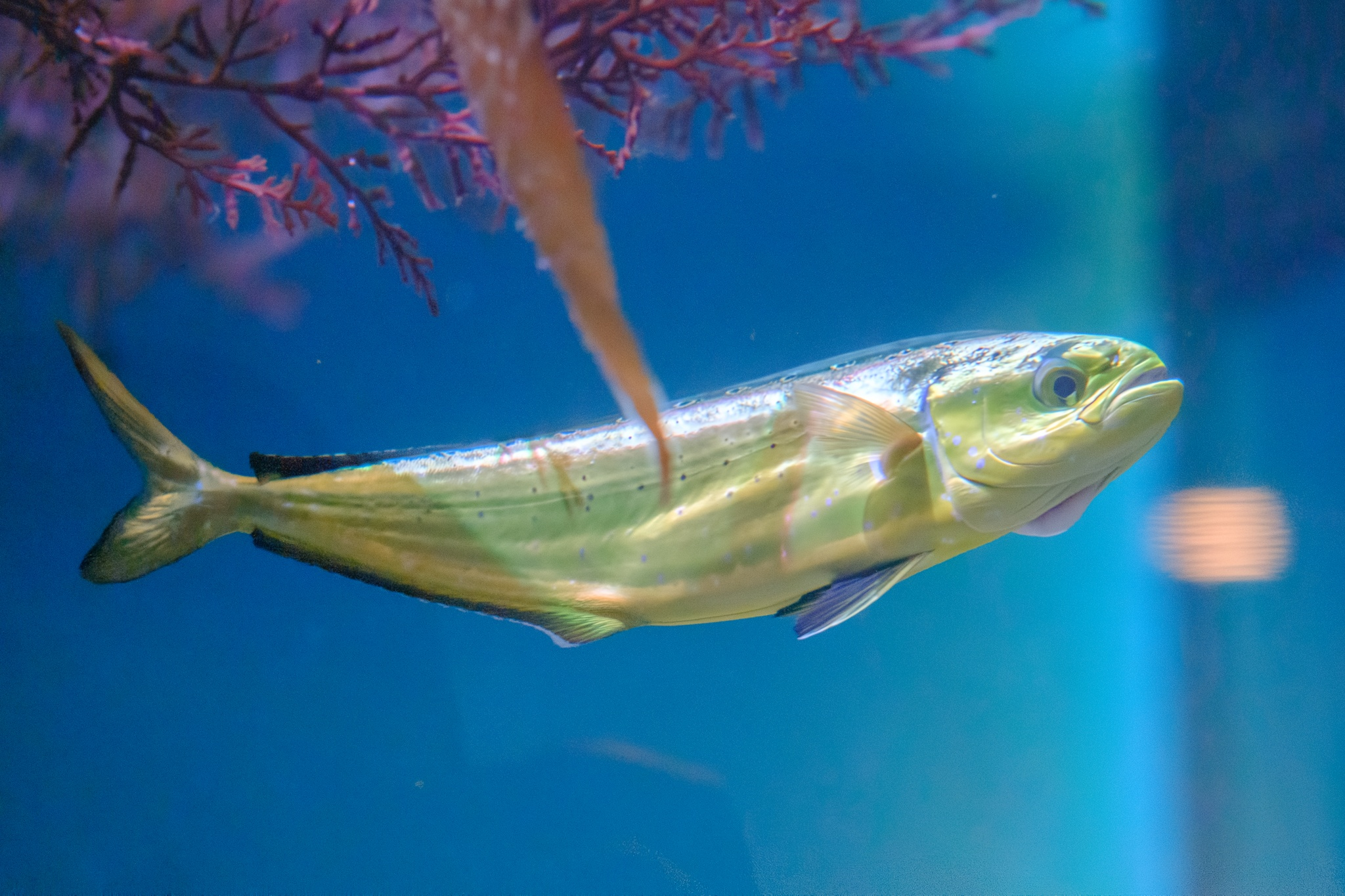
- Mahi-mahi (C. hippurus)

Scientific classification
- Kingdom: Animalia
- Phylum: Chordata
- Class: Actinopterygii
- Division: Teleostei
- Order: Carangiformes
- Suborder: Carangoidei
- Family: Coryphaenidae; Rafinesque, 1810
- Genus: Coryphaena; Linnaeus, 1758

Type species
- Coryphaena hippurus Linnaeus, 1758

Species
- See text.

= Coryphaena =

Genus of fishes

Coryphaena is a genus of marine ray-finned fishes known as the dolphinfishes, and is currently the only known genus in the family Coryphaenidae. The generic name is from Greek κορυφή (koryphē, "crown, top") and -αινα (-aina, feminine suffix). Species in this genus have compressed heads and single dorsal fins that run the entire length of the fishes' bodies.

Dolphinfish are aggressive predatory fish that actively prey upon oceanic forage fishes, while in turn serving as a primary food source for many larger pelagic predators. The dolphinfish can reach up to about 40 kilograms (88 lb), and are some of the fastest-growing species in the ocean.

Despite the name, dolphinfishes are unrelated to dolphins (which are marine mammals with pointed snouts), and commercially their meat is often labeled with its Hawaiian name mahi-mahi to reduce possible public confusion. The origin of the name "dolphinfish" is recent, to avoid confusion with dolphins, as the traditional name of the fish was also "dolphin". Why the mammal and the fish were both called "dolphin" is uncertain, but theories include that dolphinfish are about the size of a small dolphin, or due to dorado (Spanish for "golden") having been purportedly used historically in Spanish for both dolphins (normally delfín) and dolphinfish.

== Species ==
The currently recognized species in this genus are:

Image	Scientific name	Common name	Distribution
	Coryphaena equiselis Linnaeus, 1758	pompano dolphinfish	Pan-tropical oceans
	Coryphaena hippurus Linnaeus, 1758	mahi-mahi, common dolphinfish, or dorado	Pan-tropical oceans

=== Local names ===
This are the common names of Coryphaena hippurus and Coryphaena equiselis across the world.

Country	Common dolphinfish Coryphaena hippurus	Pompano dolphinfish Coryphaena equiselis
Algeria	Lámberg	
Croatia	Pučinka	
Cuba	Dorado	
Cyprus	Dakaunomoutas	
France	dorade coryphène	petite dorade coryphène
French Polynesia	Mahimahi	
Germany	Goldmakrele	
Greece	Kynigòs	
Israel	Raaman	
Italy	Lampuga	
Japan	Toohyaku, Shiira	Ebisu-shiira
Korea	Man-sae-gi	Jul-man-sae-gi
Lebanon	Lämbukeh	
Libya	Lambuka	
Malaysia	Belitung, Banang	
Malta	Lampuka	
Monaco	Lampuga	
Morocco	Msi'a amerikano	
Peru	Perico	
Philippines	Dorado	
Spain	Llampuga	
Sri Lanka	Rad hava	Diya vannava
Sweden	Guldmakrill	
Syria	Bakhti bakhti	
Tahiti	Mahi mahi	
Taiwan	Fei Niau Fu	
Tunisia	Lambouqa	
Turkey	Natasha	
United States	Dolphin, dolphinfish	Pompano, blue dolphin
Hawai'i and eastern Pacific	Mahi mahi	"The other mahi mahi"
North Vietnam	Cá nục heo [cờ]	
South Vietnam	Cá dũa	

== See also ==
- List of fish families
