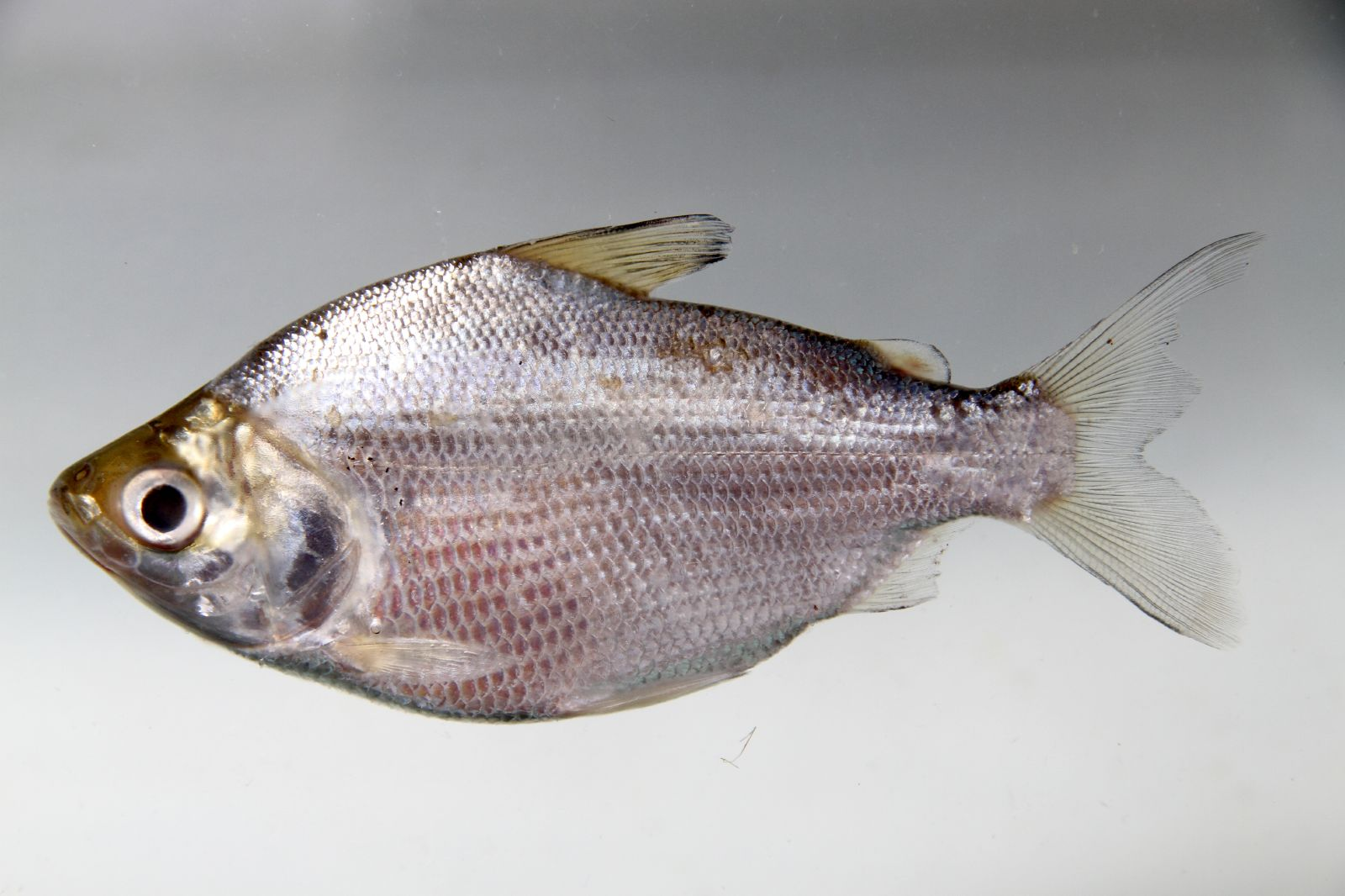
- Curimata cyprinoides

Scientific classification
- Kingdom: Animalia
- Phylum: Chordata
- Class: Actinopterygii
- Order: Characiformes
- Family: Curimatidae
- Genus: Curimata; L. A. G. Bosc, 1817

Type species
- Salmo edentulus (a synonym of Salmo cyprinoides Linnaeus, 1766) Bloch, 1794

Synonyms
- Acuticurimata Fowler, 1941; Allenina Fernández-Yépez, 1948; Bitricarinata Fernández-Yépez, 1948; Bondia Fernández-Yépez, 1948; Bondichthys Whitley, 1953; Camposella Fernández-Yépez, 1948; Camposichthys Whitley, 1953; Curimatus Oken, 1817; Lambepiedra Fernández-Yépez, 1948; Peltapleura Fowler, 1906; Semitapicis C. H. Eigenmann & R. S. Eigenmann, 1889; Stupens Whitley, 1953

= Curimata (fish) =

Genus of fishes

Curimata is a genus of freshwater ray-finned fishes belonging to the family Curimatidae, the toothless characins. The fishes in this genus are found in tropical South America.

== Species ==
Curimata contains the following valid species:

- Curimata acutirostris Vari & R. E. dos Reis, 1995
- Curimata aspera (Günther, 1868)
- Curimata cerasina Vari, 1984
- Curimata cisandina (W. R. Allen, 1942)
- Curimata cyprinoides (Linnaeus, 1766)
- Curimata incompta Vari 1984
- Curimata inornata Vari, 1989
- Curimata knerii (Steindachner, 1876)
- Curimata macrops (C. H. Eigenmann & R. S. Eigenmann, 1889)
- Curimata mivartii (Steindachner, 1878)
- Curimata ocellata (C. H. Eigenmann & R. S. Eigenmann, 1889)
- Curimata roseni Vari, 1989
- Curimata vittata (Kner, 1858)
