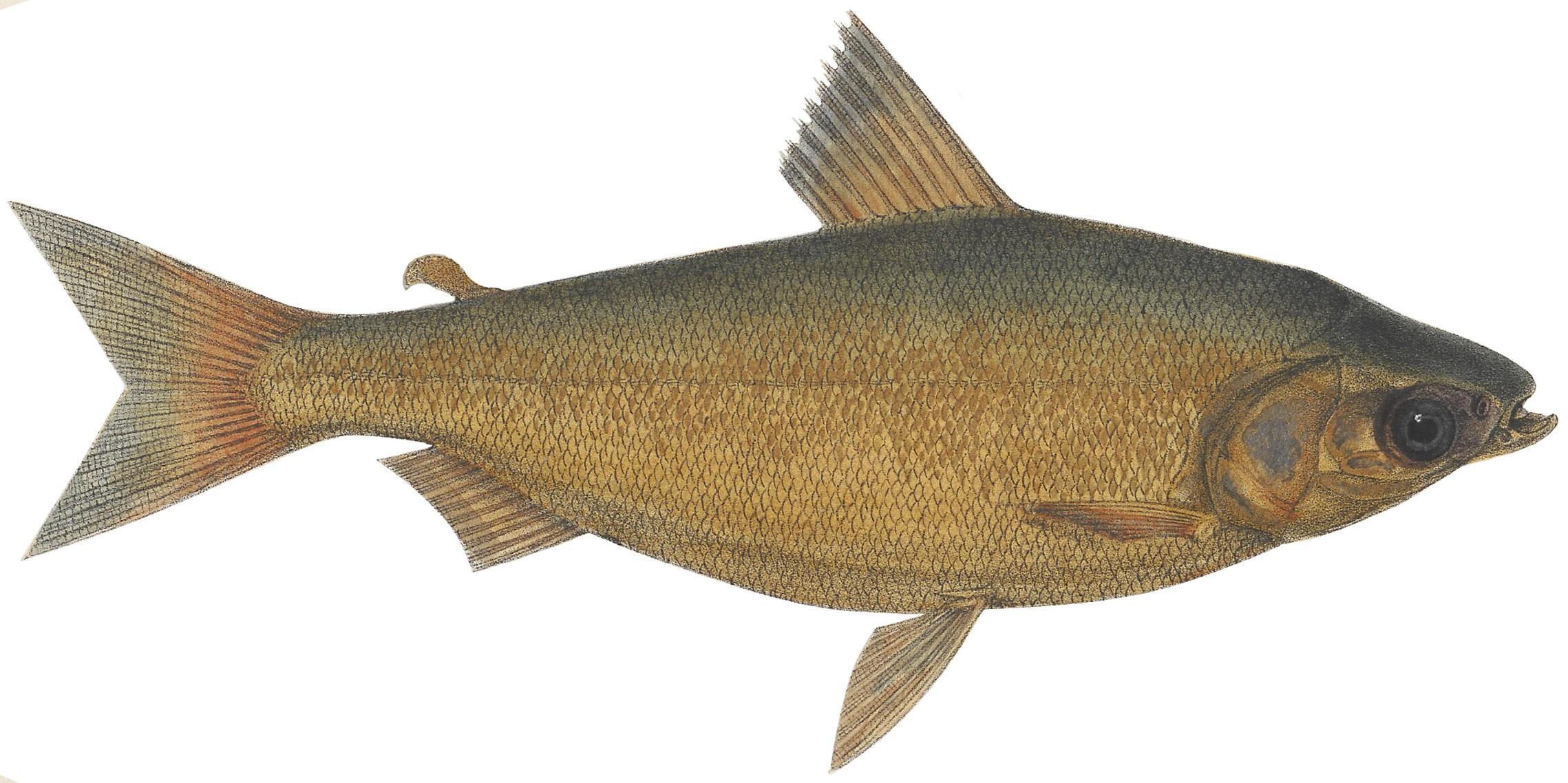
- Potamorhina latior

Scientific classification
- Kingdom: Animalia
- Phylum: Chordata
- Class: Actinopterygii
- Order: Characiformes
- Family: Curimatidae
- Genus: Potamorhina; Cope, 1878

Type species
- Curimatus (Anodus) pristigaster Steindachner, 1876

Synonyms
- Gasterotomus C. H. Eigenmann, 1910; Suprasinelepichthys Fernández-Yépez, 1948

= Potamorhina =

Genus of fishes

Potamorhina is a genus of freshwater ray-finned fishes belonging to the family Curimatidae, the toothless characins. The fishes in this genus are found in tropical South America.

== Species ==
Potamorhina contains the following vaid species:

- Potamorhina altamazonica (Cope, 1878)
- Potamorhina laticeps (Valenciennes, 1850)
- Potamorhina latior (Spix & Agassiz, 1829)
- Potamorhina pristigaster (Steindachner, 1876)
- Potamorhina squamoralevis (Braga & Azpelicueta, 1983)
