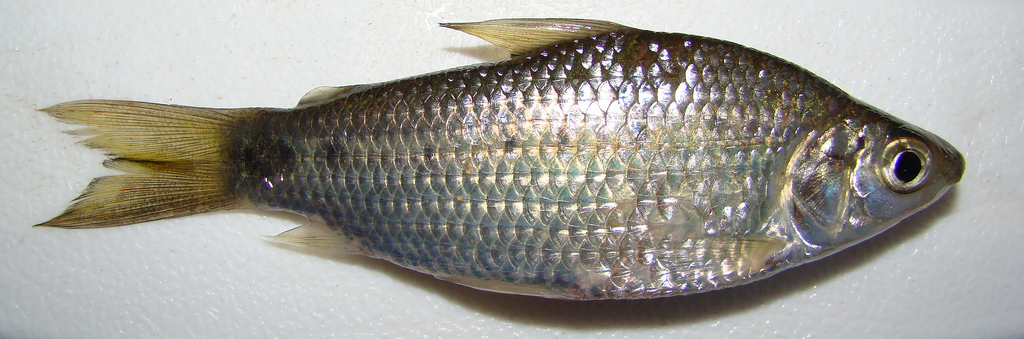
- Cyphocharax voga

Scientific classification
- Kingdom: Animalia
- Phylum: Chordata
- Class: Actinopterygii
- Division: Teleostei
- Order: Characiformes
- Suborder: Characoidei
- Family: Curimatidae; Gill, 1858

Genera
- See text

= Curimatidae =

Curimatidae Temporal range: Oligocene to present

Family of fishes

The Curimatidae, toothless characins, are a family of freshwater fishes, of the order Characiformes. They originate from southern Costa Rica to northern Argentina. The family has around 105 species, many of them frequently exploited for human consumption. They are closely related to the Prochilodontidae.

This family lacks jaw teeth, although they do sometimes have small teeth on their pharyngeal plates. They eat films of slime coating underwater surfaces, which consist largely of algae, zooplankton and detritus. It has been suggested that some species like Psectrogaster essequibensis may change their diet in correlation with the sediment content of the water, showing a diet mainly based on algae in waters with high sediment load, and an omnivorous or detritivorous diet in waters with low sediment load.

== Classification ==
Curimatidae contains the following genera:

- Curimata Bosc, 1817
- Curimatella C. H. Eigenmann & R. S. Eigenmann, 1889
- Curimatopsis Steindachner, 1876
- Cyphocharax Fowler, 1906
- Potamorhina Cope, 1878
- Psectrogaster C. H. Eigenmann & R. S. Eigenmann 1889
- Pseudocurimata Fernández-Yépez, 1948
- Steindachnerina Fowler, 1906

In addition, one fossil genus is known in †Plesiocurimata Figueiredo & Costa-Carvalho, 1999 from the Oligocene-aged Tremembé Formation of Brazil.

== See also ==
- List of fish families
