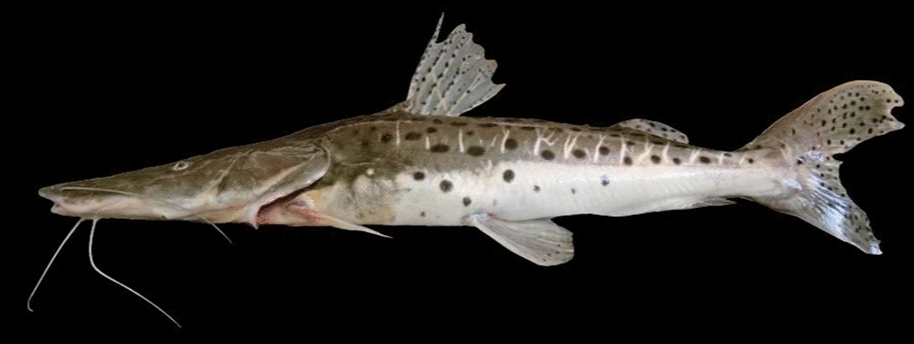

Conservation status
- Near Threatened (IUCN 3.1)

Scientific classification
- Kingdom: Animalia
- Phylum: Chordata
- Class: Actinopterygii
- Division: Teleostei
- Order: Siluriformes
- Family: Pimelodidae
- Genus: Pseudoplatystoma
- Species: P. corruscans

Binomial name
- Pseudoplatystoma corruscans (Spix & Agassiz, 1829)

Synonyms
- Platystoma corruscans Spix & Agassiz, 1829; Sorubim caparary Spix, 1829; Silurus macrocephalus Larrañaga, 1923

= Pseudoplatystoma corruscans =

Species of long-whiskered catfish

Pseudoplatystoma corruscans, known commonly as the spotted sorubim, spotted surubí, or pintado, is a species of long-whiskered catfish. P. corruscans can reach a total length (TL) of 160 to 200 centimetres (63 to 79 in) and weigh in at 120 kilograms (260 lb), with females typically achieving greater size than males. As with other species of Pseudoplatystoma, the spotted sorubim is distributed in Neotropical South American rivers, with its range specific to the La Plata and São Francisco basins.

== Description ==
The spotted sorubim is notable for the extensive spotting that covers its length and fins. The dorsal coloration is a dark olive brown, with lighter cream to white coloration on the ventral side. The head is wide and depressed, and the fish displays an overall fusiform body shape. The mouth spans the width of the head and contains groupings of small teeth. Characteristic of catfish, two maxillary barbels protrude from the longer upper jaw, and another pair aligns with the lower jaw. The sorubim gains swimming power primarily through its caudal fin, moving the length of the body in a fluid side-to-side motion that enables it to rapidly strike prey.

Spotted sorubim are piscivorous, feeding on fish and other organisms when the opportunity arises. They are nocturnal and hunt at night or in otherwise obscured conditions, allowing them to best remain under cover and ambush prey.

== Systematics ==
The genus Pseudoplatystoma was first described by Carl Linnaeus in 1766 and published in Systema Naturae, identifying Silurus fasciatus (now Pseudoplatystoma fasciatum). Pieter Bleeker would re-assign the genus with the name Pseudoplatystoma in 1862. The name stems from the Greek pseudes ("false"), platys ("flat"), and stoma ("mouth").

The species Pseudoplatystoma corruscans was originally described by Spix and Agassiz in 1829 as Platystoma corruscans. The species name comes from the Latin corrusco ("to flash"), referring to the elaborate mottling and barring of the spotted sorubim.

At the genus level, Pseudoplatystoma is a monophyletic lineage of the long-whiskered catfish family Pimelodidae. Despite this confirmation, interfamily relationships between Siluriformes fishes are relatively controversial and inconclusive.

== Distribution ==
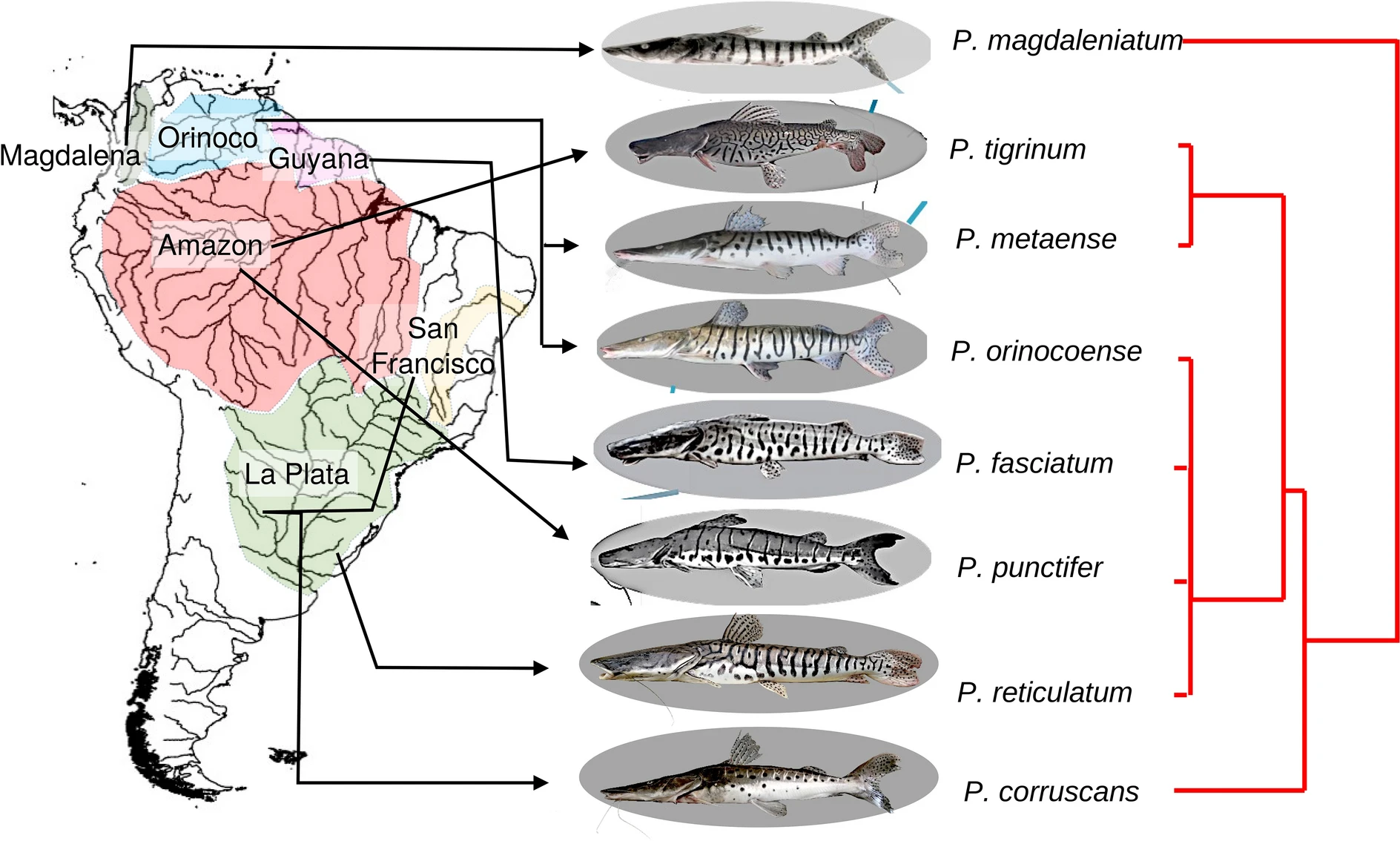
Phylogeny and distribution of Pseudoplatystoma species throughout South America

All Pseudoplatystoma species occur within South America, with P. corruscans being native to the São Francisco and La Plata basins. These basins run through the countries of Argentina, Brazil, Paraguay, and Uruguay. P. corruscans experiences some range overlap with the species Pseudoplatystoma reticulatum, occurring in the Middle Paraná River Basin.

The spotted sorubim is confirmed to have speciated by the late Pleistocene, with a fossilized neurocranium fragment found in river deposits from the Carcarañá River in Argentina, where it is extant today. This P. corruscans specimen represents the sole fossil record for the genus.

As a potamodromous (freshwater migratory) species, P. corruscans occupy various habitats throughout their life history, encountering floodplains, rivers, lakes, and tributaries of different water speeds and conditions.

== Life History ==
=== Migration ===
The catfishes of genus Pseudoplatystoma perform characteristic migratory behaviors for feeding and reproduction. Radio telemetry has enabled the identification of pre-spawning, spawning, and non-spawning sites of spotted sorubim. The timing of sorubim migration coincides with flood cycles starting in December and ending in June. These conditions contribute to reproductive success through food availability and predator evasion. Their migration to spawning sites is also suggested to follow the movement of Prochilodus lineatus as a primary food source.

From the months of October to January, P. corruscans migrate upstream to reach a nursery location. Otolith analyses suggest that spotted sorubim obligatorily designate specific nursery areas within their home basins for spawning. Following reproduction, females disperse downstream to feed from January to September.

=== Reproduction ===
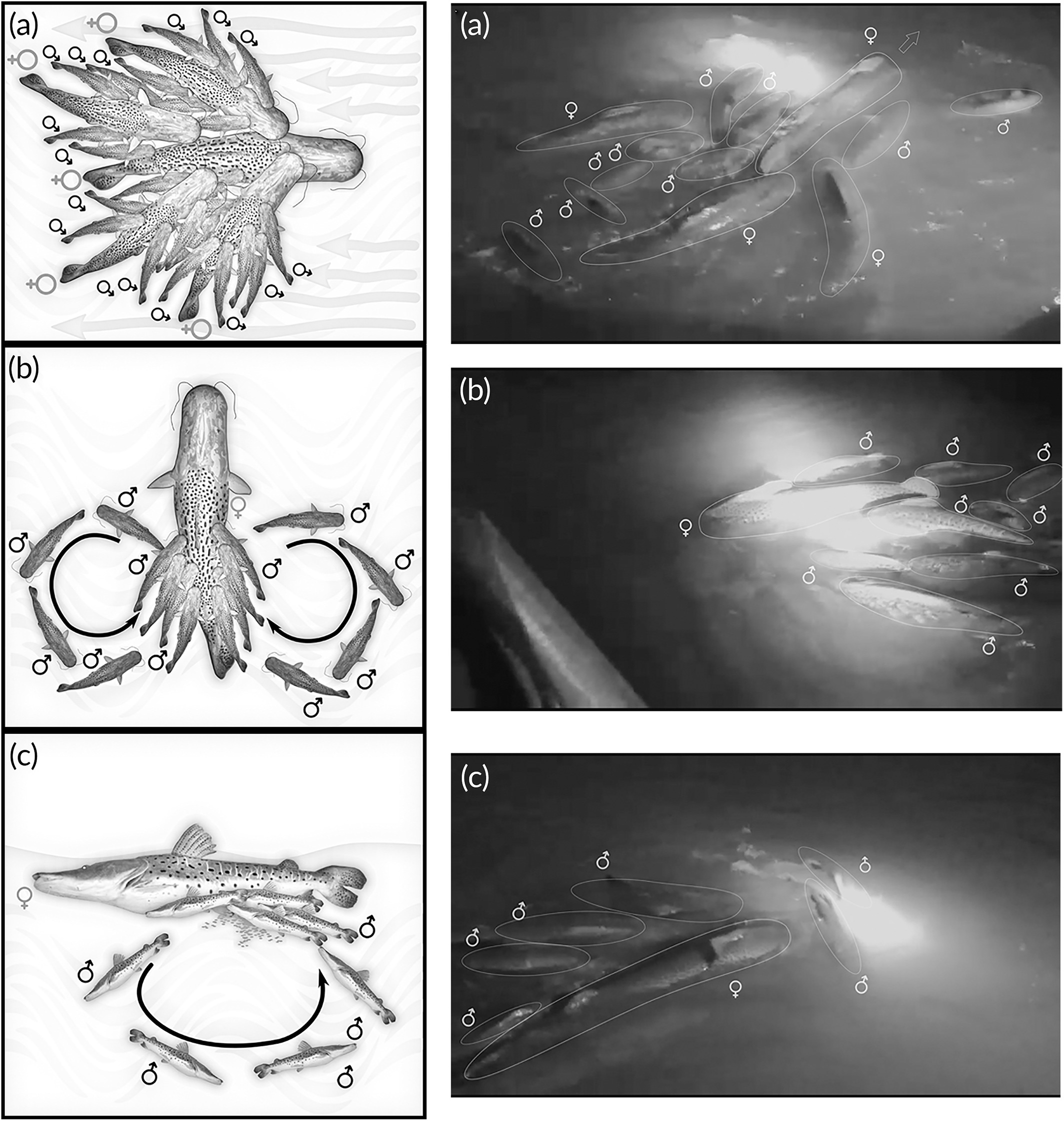
Competitive spawning behaviors of male P. corruscans

Spotted sorubim are polygamous, with males observed to outnumber females during brief spawning periods. The female releases hundreds of thousands of eggs in a total spawning event, upon which males compete to fertilize. Fertilization of eggs occurs outside of the female parent.

The eggs of P. corruscans are spherical and yellow in coloration, with yolk density defined as telolecithal. Parents provide no parental care to young. Upon hatching, larvae measure at an average length of about 4.5 millimeters.

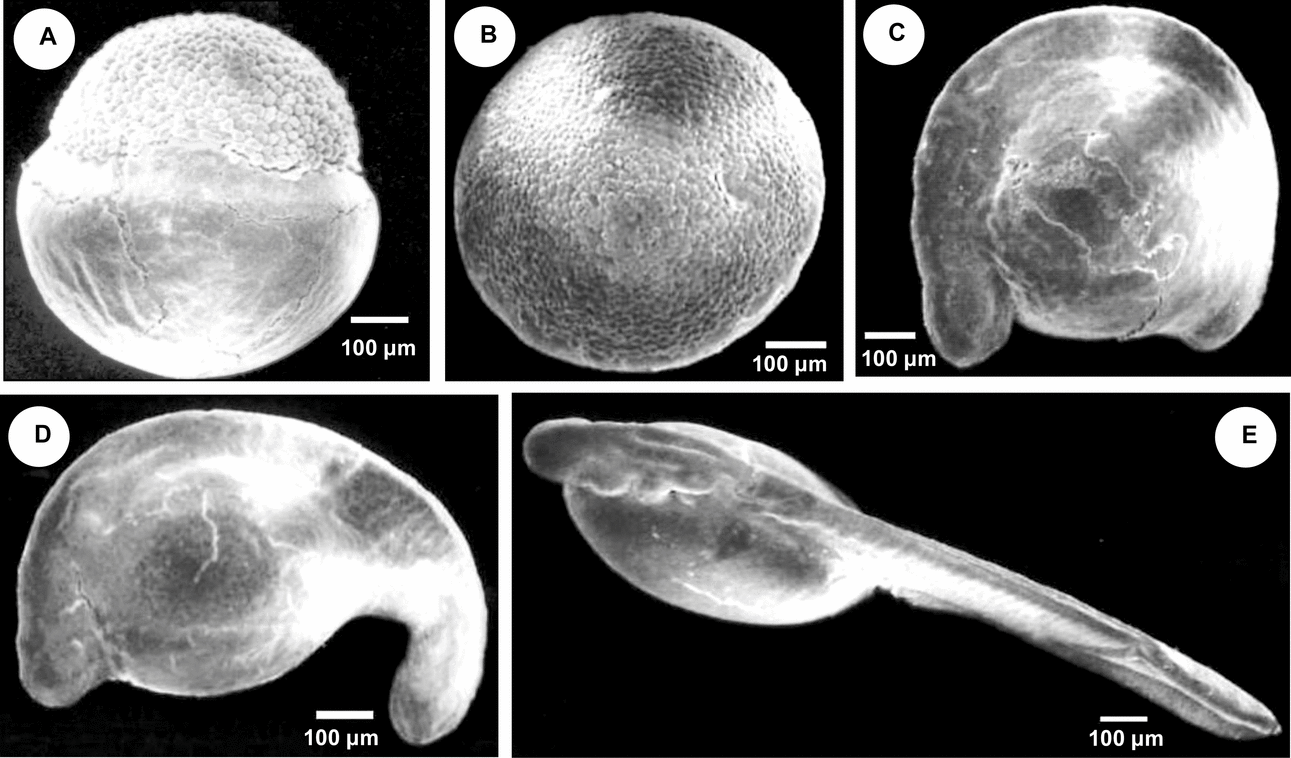
Scanning electron micrograph of P. corruscans development

After hatching, juveniles move into nearby floodplains where they mature in the lower water column. First maturity (time of first reproduction) occurs at different rates for males and females, with all males being considered mature at about 3 years, and all females being considered mature by 2.5 years. While they develop to become larger than their male counterparts, females are shorter in length at first maturity, consistent with their earlier maturation. On average, TL at first maturation in females is about 59 centimetres (23 in), while males reach about 64 centimetres (25 in).

During nonmigratory seasons female and male P. corruscans exhibit different habitat occupancy. Males remain in fast-current rivers while females reside in nearby lakes.

Researchers note the occurrence of some nonmigratory or "resident" P. corruscans individuals that differ from the typical migratory life history, but the reason for this behavior is largely unknown.

=== Growth ===
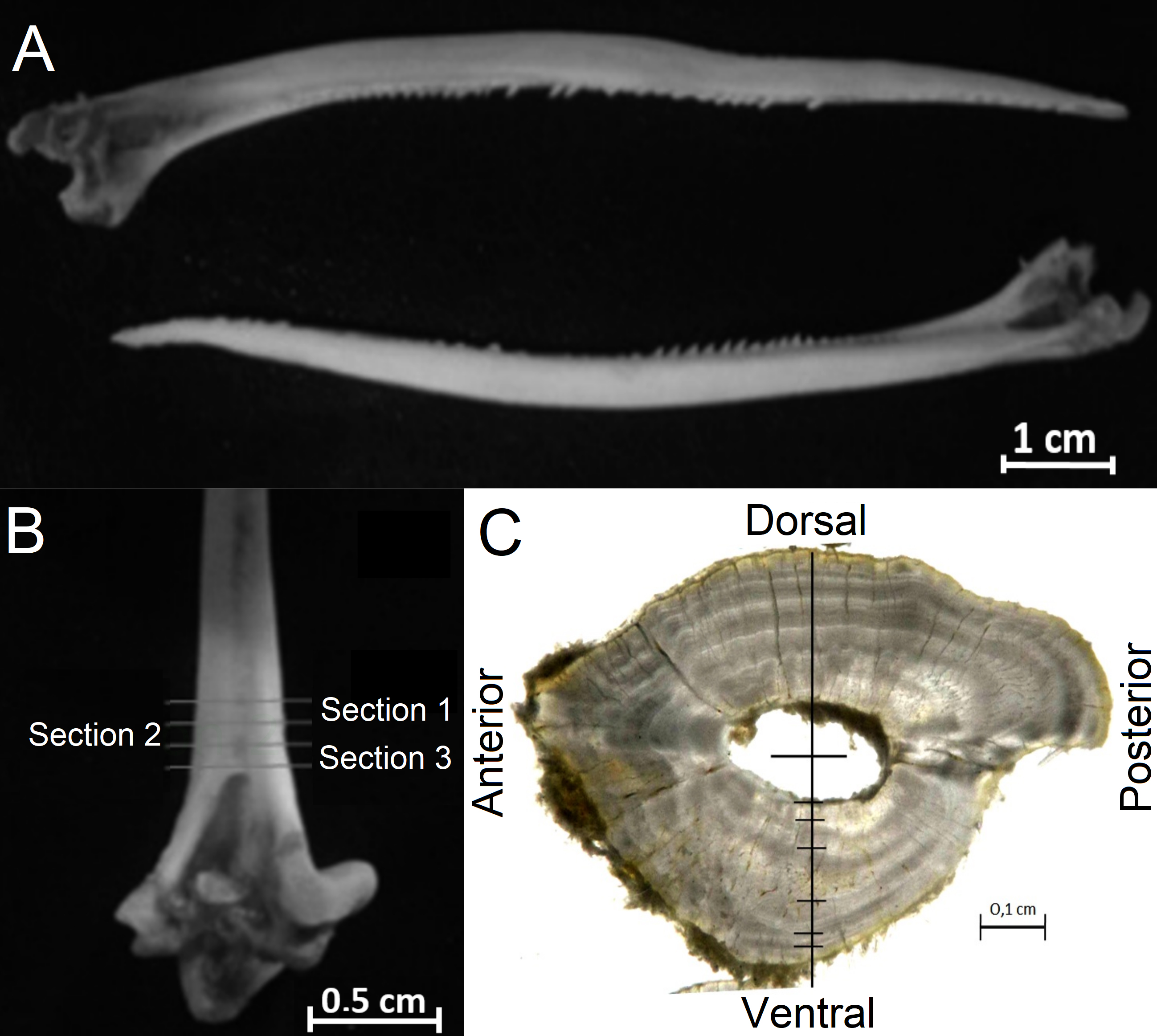
Cross-section of P. corruscans spine used in aging

P. corruscans is a large fish, often reaching 160 to 200 centimetres (63 to 79 in) in total length (TL). Sexual size dimorphism is displayed in this species, with females being larger than their male counterparts at maturity. Extremes in size have been observed, with fishermen local to the Pantanal region having reported observing spotted sorubim of over 200 centimetres (79 in) TL.

Age and growth of P. corruscans may be quantified through the removal of pectoral spines, which may be examined for growth rings. Growth rates may differ depending on the regionality of a population, attributed to a combination of differing growing season length and genetics.

== Feeding ==
The spotted sorubim is piscivorous, feeding primarily on other fish and occasionally other smaller organisms. It hunts at night and in waters with very low visibility, allowing it to opportunistically ambush prey. While olfaction is an important feature for predatory fish, P. corruscans is capable of performing feeding behavior even when limited to sight and tactile senses. When in proximity of food, the spotted sorubim stalks toward its prey, sensing with its barbels, before striking and returning to an area with cover.

== Conservation Status ==
=== Food products ===
P. corruscans bears great cultural significance in Brazil and South America overall as a food source. Its meat is favorable for having no intramuscular bones, and is generally appealing in texture and taste. Hybridized offspring of male P. corruscans and female P. reticulatum are called "cachapinta" in the food industry, and are consumed in the form of fillet and pâté products. The name cachapinta is derived from the respective local names of the two species, pintado (P. corruscans) and cachara (P. reticulatum). There have also been developments toward the utilization of P. corruscans as an alternative food source in the form of gluten-free patties.

=== Domestication ===
Aquarium hobbyists have attempted to keep various Pseudoplatystoma species, but are often unable to accommodate their large size after maturation. No wild Pseudoplatystoma populations exist in North America, but they are present in the semi-domestic animal trade. In 2002, an unidentified Pseudoplatystoma was found dead in Illinois, likely originating from an aquarium.

=== Threats ===
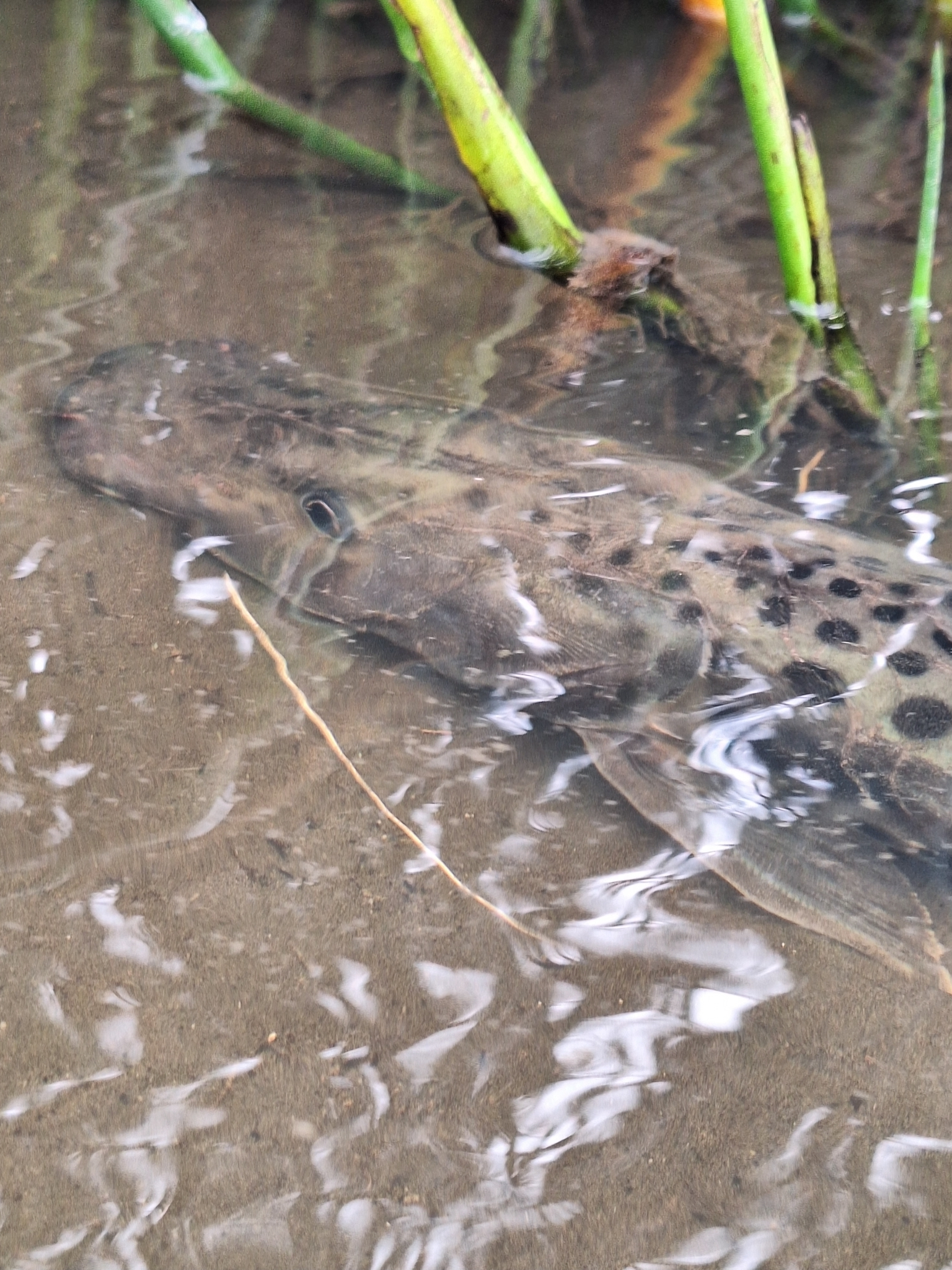
Wild P. corruscans in Argentina

The spotted sorubim is designated Near Threatened by the IUCN as recently as 2023. Declines in sorubim populations are often attributed to overwhelming fishing activity, though only passive action has been taken to institute commercial fishing bans during the reproductive season. Other factors threatening the species are habitat fragmentation caused by dams, as well as silting. In canals along the Paraná River basin, fish passages have been constructed to facilitate migration through these artificial barriers.

The practice of rearing sorubim in aquaculture has also introduced new threats to wild populations. The spotted sorubim's relatively high growth rate for its size and its cultural role as food make it an ideal stock species for aquatic farms. The species P. corruscans and P. reticulatum are often kept in the same hatchery facilities, and hybrids are intentionally developed for their hardiness and greater suitability in aquaculture settings. Escaped fertile hybrids of these species have been identified in the wild, where they threaten the genetic pools of their parent species. While hybridization between parent species in the wild is possible, its occurrence is much less common than in artificially produced scenarios. PCR techniques have been developed as an effective indicator of molecular distinctions between parent species and hybrids in both wild and aquaculture spaces. Identification and enforcement of fishery regulations are essential practices to prevent the genetic introgression and potential extinction of P. corruscans as a species.
