= Sabalo =

Sabalo may refer to:

- Sábalo, the name of various species of fish
- USS Sabalo, the name of more than one United States Navy ship
