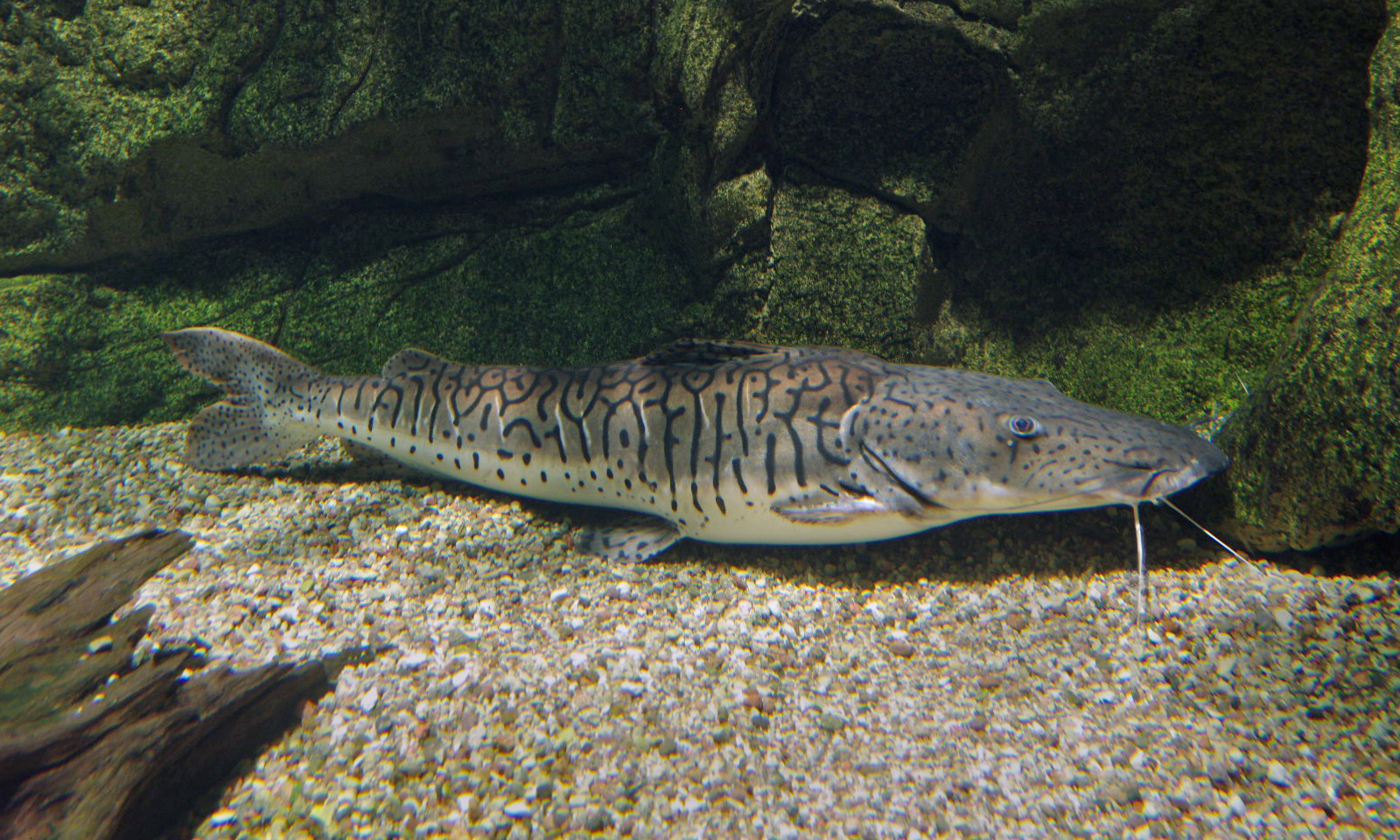

Conservation status
- Least Concern (IUCN 3.1)

Scientific classification
- Kingdom: Animalia
- Phylum: Chordata
- Class: Actinopterygii
- Division: Teleostei
- Order: Siluriformes
- Family: Pimelodidae
- Genus: Pseudoplatystoma
- Species: P. fasciatum

Binomial name
- Pseudoplatystoma fasciatum (Linnaeus, 1766)

Synonyms
- Platystoma fasciatum; Silurus fasciatus

= Pseudoplatystoma fasciatum =

Barred sorubim

Species of fish

Pseudoplatystoma fasciatum (common names barred sorubim or barred catfish) is a species of long-whiskered catfish native to Brazil. It inhabits freshwater systems within the Guiana Shield and utilizes both rivers and wetlands as habitat. P. fasciatum have distinct vertical bars across the body, and females are larger in size compared to males. Pseudoplatystoma species are adapted to hydrologic variation, reproducing during highflow events. Catfish possess high sensory organs to detect prey in low light conditions, feeding along the benthos. P. fasciatum is a native species to the Amazon basin where it is a vital resource for food and commerce.

== Etymology ==
The etymology of Pseudoplatystoma fasciatum comes from Greek and Latin roots. The genus name is pseudo meaning false, platys meaning flat, and stoma meaning mouth. The species name is fascia, which is Latin, meaning band

== Species description ==
P. fasciatum can be recognized by a flat, elongated head with a rounded snout that can be up to one-half the length of the body. As adults, they can reach up to 90 cm (35 in) in total length. It features a short mandible and a flat, darker rostrum. It has three pairs of barbels, including the maxillary barbels, which are dark in color and extend beyond the pelvic fins, as well as two lighter-colored ventral chin barbels: the anterior pair, which are about three-quarters the length of the head, and the posterior pair, which reach the tips of the pectoral spines. The body is characterized by a dark dorsal side and lighter ventral coloration, along with distinctive dark vertical stripes running along the sides. P. fasciatum has one dorsal fin positioned near the head, along with an adipose fin situated posteriorly. All fins are lightly spotted with black, including the pelvic fins, which have six rays; the dorsal has seven rays, the anal has thirteen, and the caudal fin has seventeen.

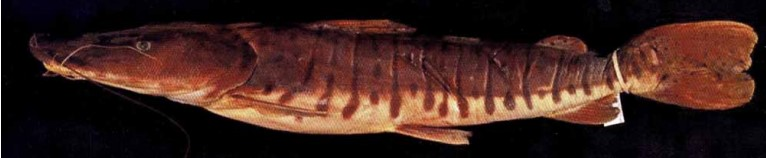
Preserved P. fasciatum specimen.

== Systematics ==
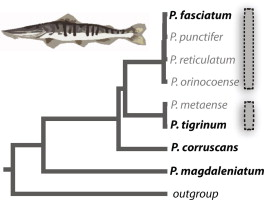
Phylogenetic tree with current molecular evidence, showing the species of Pseodoplatystomata.

According to Riehl and Haensch, five subspecies have been described:

- P. f. brevifile C. H. Eigenmann & Eigenmann, 1882
- P. f. fasciatum Linnaeus, 1766
- P. f. intermedium C. H. Eigenmann & Eigenmann, 1888
- P. f. nigricans C. H. Eigenmann & Eigenmann, 1889
- P. f. reticulatum C. H. Eigenmann & Eigenmann, 1889

However, in a 2007 morphological study Buitrago-Suárez and Burr placed P. f. brevifile, P. f. intermedium, and P. f. nigricans, in the synonymy of P. punctifer, and elevated P. f. reticulatum as another distinct species P. reticulatum. Previously, all subspecies except P. f. reticulatum were considered synonyms of P. fasciatum. These conclusions were challenged in 2011 by Carvalho-Costa et al, who used a molecular systematics approach to argue that Pseodoplatystomata only had 4 distinct species, with P. punctifer, P. reticulatum, and P. orinocoense falling under P. fasciatum, and P. metaense falling under P. tigrinum. The phylogeny of the genus, and the proper breadth of P. fasciatum, is still disputed, with recent research still using the 8 species proposed in 2007 by Buitrago-Suarez and Burr.

== Distribution ==
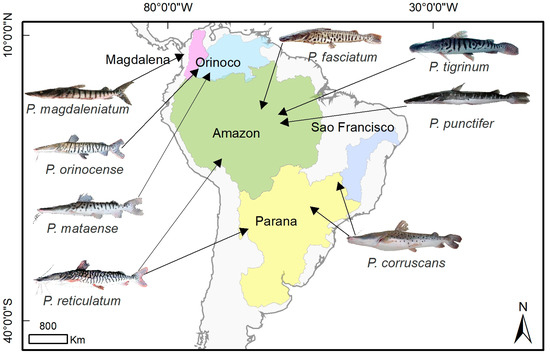
Distribution map of Pseodoplatystomata species.

P. fasciatum is found across the Guyana Shield, in the Essequibo, Corantijn, Orinoco, and Amazon river basins, where it occupies large tropical river systems and adjacent floodplain habitats. The inundated floodplains serve as nursery habitats for eggs and juvenile fish, as abundant emergent vegetation provides protection from predators.

== Diet ==
P. fasciatum primarily feeds on fish and small crabs, including anostomids, loricariids, cichlids, and crabs. Like other Pseudoplatystoma species they can be found feeding at night near the benthos. Feeding in low light can be difficult to find prey if the species is not equipped with the right tools. P. fasciatum has three pairs of barbels along with chemosensory organs, which allow it to detect and capture prey at night along with other catfish species.

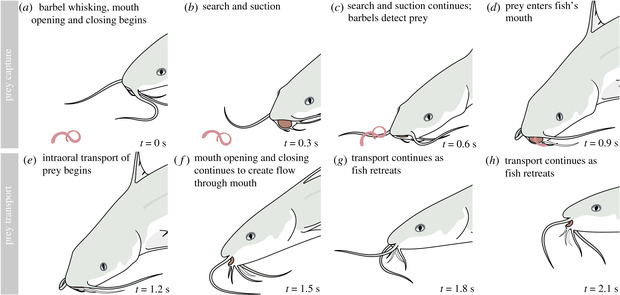
Feeding strategy of catfish, using barbels.

== Life history ==
Pseudoplatystoma catfishes migrate both for feeding and reproduction. During periods of low water, males are typically found within the main river, while females are more commonly associated with lakes along the riverbanks. At the onset of the high-water season, adults migrate upstream to breed while juveniles tend to remain in floodplain areas and show little to no evidence of migration. Some adults have been observed moving through river rapids even during the low-water period, potentially in search of suitable habitat and reproduction. Telemetry and otolith studies have found the mean migratory distance is 124 km (77 mi) between dry and rising-water seasons, with upstream travel occurring mainly at the end of the rise Migration patterns show P. fasciatum exhibit homing behaviors, returning to the river they were born in.

Juvenile P. fasciatum tend to reach sexual maturity around two years old. The size at which the species reaches sexual maturity has been observed through captive rearing experiments. Females reach a more notable size. They become sexually mature at 56 cm (22 in), while males reach maturity at 45 cm (18 in). Related Pseudoplatystoma species have been found to have relatively short reproductive seasons, during high water. During flooding events, gonads mature, linking reproduction to hydrologic events. During high flows, eggs are fertilized through external fertilization, where they are then transported by the current to floodplain habitats. Floodplain habitat acts as a nursery, providing shelter and food for Juveniles. P. fasciatum can reproduce multiple times during their life, with an average life expectancy of 8–10 years.

P. fasciatum is parasitized by a variety of monogeneans, digeneans, nematodes, acanthocephalans, crustaceans, and myxosporeans. Campos et al (2008) found a 100% rate of parasitism by monogeneans in P. fasciatum sampled from the Aquidauana river, and a 58% rate of infection by nematodes. Monogenean species have been found on the body surface, gills, and in nasal cavities of Pimelodidae species in the Amazon Parasitism of the gills by monogeneans can lead to degradation of the gills, causing difficulty in breathing and death.

== Conservation ==
As of their last assessment in 2021, P. fasciatum is categorized as least concern by the IUCN. However, like many species of freshwater fish worldwide, their population is decreasing in size and becoming increasingly fragmented. Hydroelectric dams are a major threat to Pseudoplatystoma species, who rely on seasonal flood pulses for migration and reproduction. In the Amazon basin, P. fasciatum is also threatened by overfishing with the expansion of gillnets, and deforestation. Amazonian catfish are adapted to utilize floodplain habitat for rearing, and deforestation destroys this habitat. Conservation of this species is vital to the health of the fishing industry in the Amazon. Pseudoplatystoma species are known for their low fat contents and lack of intramuscular spines, making them highly valued in markets. Native communities also value P. fasciatum. During the dry season natives will utilize dry sandbars to seine in fish, where they are dried for food and used as commerce. P. fasciatum and P. tigrinum are key components of fisheries in Amazonas state, but a number of studies have indicated declining yearly catches and lower average weights at catch.

== Commercial rearing ==
To help take pressure off of wild populations, P. fasciatum is a species of interest for aquaculture for food production. Nuñez et al created a protocol to effectively rear P. fasciatum.
