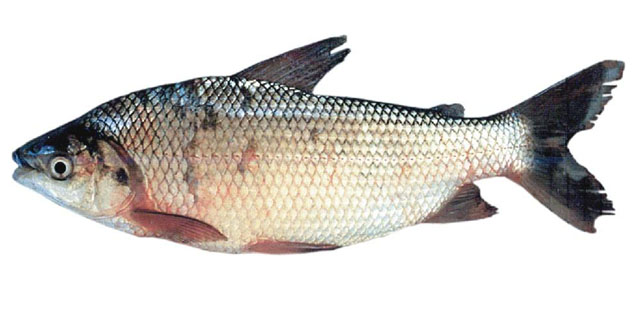
- Prochilodus lineatus

Scientific classification
- Kingdom: Animalia
- Phylum: Chordata
- Class: Actinopterygii
- Division: Teleostei
- Order: Characiformes
- Family: Prochilodontidae
- Genus: Prochilodus; Agassiz, 1829

Type species
- Prochilodus argenteus Spix & Agassiz, 1829

Species
- see text

Synonyms
- Pacu Agassiz, 1829; Pacu Cuvier, 1829; Pacu Valenciennes, 1847; Chilomyzon Fowler, 1906

= Prochilodus =

Genus of fishes

Prochilodus is a genus of freshwater ray-finned fishes belonging to the family Prochilodontidae, the bocachicos or flannel-mouthed characiformes. This family includes two other genera, Ichthyoelephas and Semaprochilodus.

The greatest species richness of Prochilodus is in river basins in eastern, southeastern and southern Brazil (where it is commonly called curimba, curimata or grumata), though some species inhabit the river basins of the Amazon, Guianas, Colombia, Venezuela, Paraguay and northeastern Argentina.

The largest species in the genus reach about 80 centimetres (2.6 ft) in length, but most species barely reach half that size.

== Taxonomy ==
Species of Prochilodus have an irregular marking on the upper half of their opercle, a marking not present in Semaprochilodus or Ichthyoelephas; this mark, which is made by a "field" of brown to black chromatophores, is thought to be a distinguishing trait of the genus. Another trait is their anal fin, which is either hyaline or irregularly marked by dark pigmentation, a trait shared with Ichthyoelephas.

Prochilodus contains the following valid species, which inhabits the listed regions:

- Prochilodus argenteus Spix & Agassiz, 1829 (Rio São Francisco; introduced elsewhere)
- Prochilodus brevis Steindachner, 1875 (Lower tributaries of Rio São Francisco & coastal rivers of Northeastern Brazil)
- Prochilodus britskii R. M. C. Castro, 1993 (Rio Apiaca; potentially upper Rio Arinos)
- Prochilodus costatus Valenciennes, 1850 (Rio São Francisco; introduced elsewhere)
- Prochilodus hartii Steindachner, 1875 (Rio Pardo & Rio Jequitinhonha)
- Prochilodus lacustris Steindachner, 1907 (Rio Mearim & Rio Parnaíba)
- Prochilodus lineatus (Valenciennes, 1837) (Rio Paraná-Rio Paraguay basin, Rio Paraíba do Sul, Lagoa dos Patos and surrounding rivers, Mar Chiquita basin and surrounding rivers, Rio Salado, and Laguna de Chascomus)
- Prochilodus magdalenae Steindachner, 1879 (Rio Atrato, Rio Sinú, Rio Cauca-Magdalena basins, and Rio Ranchería)
- Prochilodus mariae C. H. Eigenmann, 1922 (Rio Orinoco & Rio Casiquiare)
- Prochilodus nigricans Spix & Agassiz, 1829 (Rio Amazonas and Rio Tocantins; absent in northern tributaries such as Rio Negro)
- Prochilodus reticulatus Valenciennes, 1850 (Lago Maracaibo and surrounding rivers)
- Prochilodus rubrotaeniatus Jardine, 1841 (Rio Branco, Rio Marauia, Rio Cuyuni, Rio Caroni, and coastal rivers of Guyana, Suriname, and French Guiana)
- Prochilodus vimboides Kner, 1859 (From Rio Jequitinhonha to Rio Paraíba do Sul, the upper Rio Paraná basin, and Rio Sao Francisco near Três Marias)

Cladogram of the most parsimonious hypothesis of relationships based on morphological analysis by Castro and Vari (2008):

- Prochilodus
  - P. britskii, P. magdalenae, P. reticulatus, P. vimboides
  - - P. argenteus, P. costatus, P. hartii, P. lineatus
    - - P. brevis, P. lacustris, P. mariae
      - - P. nigricans
        - P. rubrotaeniatus

Some Prochilodus species are striped, having darkened scale margins which form a wavy, horizontal pattern of stripes on their flanks. Nine Prochilodus species display this patterning, a trait shared with species of Semaprochilodus but not with the more basal group containing P. britskii. The clade encompassing P. brevis and P. rubrotaeniatus possess 2 to 8 irregular chevron-like markings on the caudal fin.
