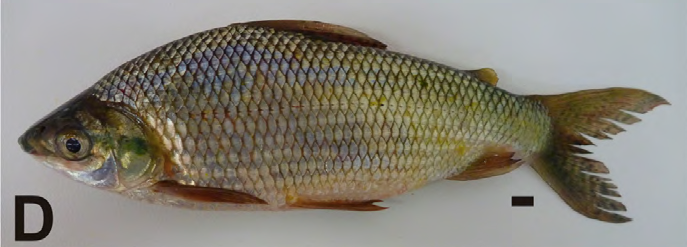
- Scale bar = 1 cm

Conservation status
- Least Concern (IUCN 3.1)

Scientific classification
- Kingdom: Animalia
- Phylum: Chordata
- Class: Actinopterygii
- Order: Characiformes
- Family: Prochilodontidae
- Genus: Prochilodus
- Species: P. nigricans

Binomial name
- Prochilodus nigricans Spix & Agassiz, 1829

= Prochilodus nigricans =

Species of fish

Prochilodus nigricans, or black prochilodus, is a species of prochilodontid fish from the Amazon Basin in South America. It supports major fisheries; according to IBAMA, it is the third most caught taxon in the Brazilian Amazon by weight, after Brachyplatystoma vaillantii and Semaprochilodus spp. The black prochilodus is migratory, moving between different parts of the Amazon. The black prochilodus reaches up to 45 cm (18 in) in total length and 1.2 kg (2.6 lb) in weight.
