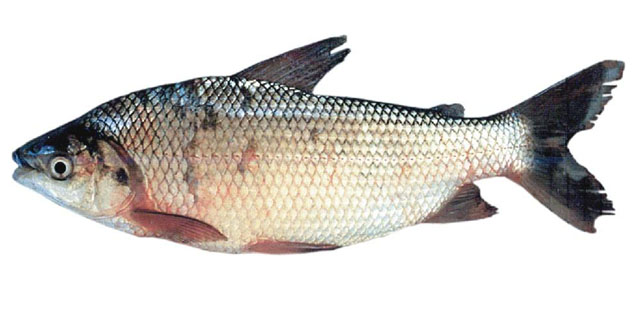
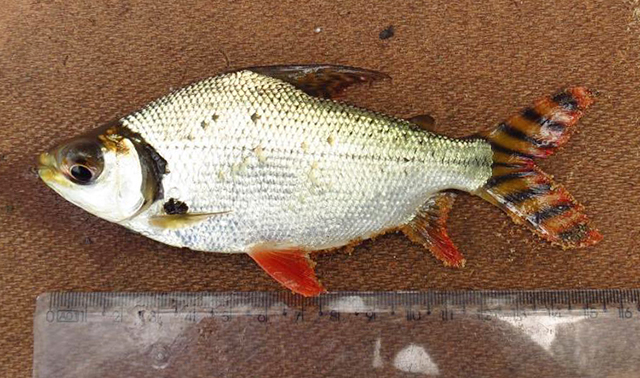
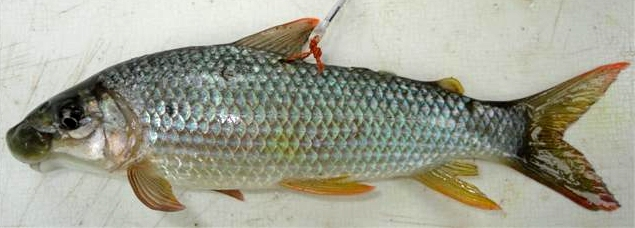

Scientific classification
- Kingdom: Animalia
- Phylum: Chordata
- Class: Actinopterygii
- Order: Characiformes
- Suborder: Characoidei
- Family: Prochilodontidae; C. H. Eigenmann, 1909

= Prochilodontidae =

Family of fishes

The Prochilodontidae, commonly known as the bocachicos or flannel-mouthed characins, are a small family of freshwater fishes found primarily in the northern half of South America, south to Paraguay and northern Argentina. This family is closely related to the Curimatidae, and were included in Characidae before that family was revised and split.

These fish have fleshy lips bearing rows of small teeth; their lips are able to be extended into a sucking disc used to feed on detritus and aufwuchs. They often live in huge schools, traveling upriver to spawn. In their native range, they are a popular food fish, and are caught in large numbers.

== Taxonomy ==
Prochilodontidae possess a number of distinguishing features, such as their oral disc, procumbent dorsal fin spines, along with specific features of the front half of their skeleton, being those of the skull, hyoid and pharyngeal apparati, and branchial arch.

Prochilodontidae contains the following genera:

- Ichthyoelephas Posada, 1909
- Prochilodus Agassiz, 1829
- Semaprochilodus Fowler, 1941

Cladogram of the most parsimonious hypothesis of relationships based on morphological analysis by Castro and Vari (2008):

- - Anostomidae
  - Chilodontidae
- - Curimatidae
  - Prochilodontidae
    - Prochilodus
      - P. britskii, P. magdalenae, P. reticulatus, P. vimboides
      - - P. argenteus, P. costatus, P. hartii, P. lineatus
        - - P. brevis, P. lacustris, P. mariae
          - - P. nigricans
            - P. rubrotaeniatus
    - - Semaprochilodus
        - S. brama, S. laticeps, S. varii
        - - S. taeniurus
          - - S. kneri
            - S. insignis
      - Ichthyoelephas
        - I. humeralis
        - I. longirostris

== Biology ==
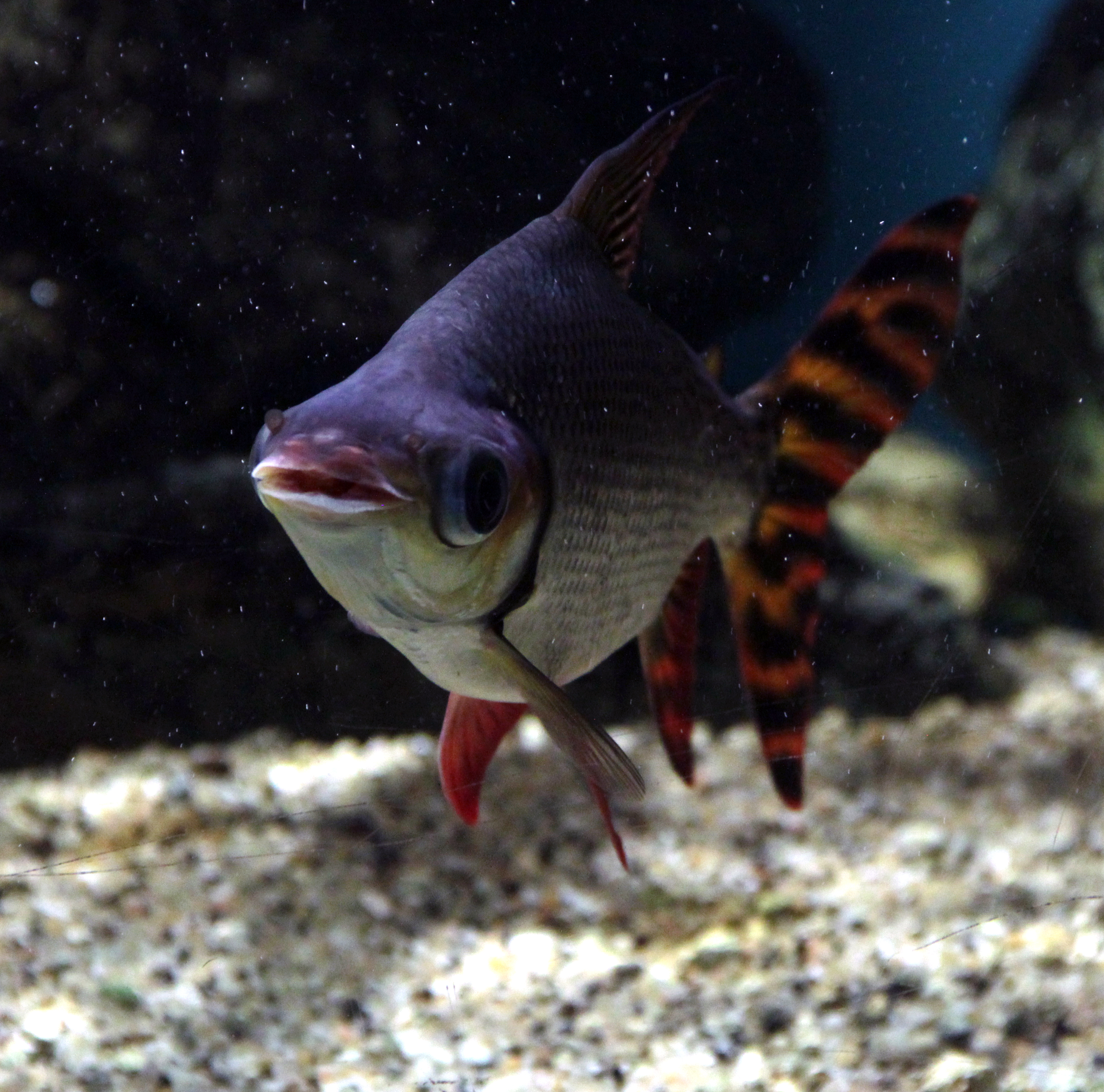
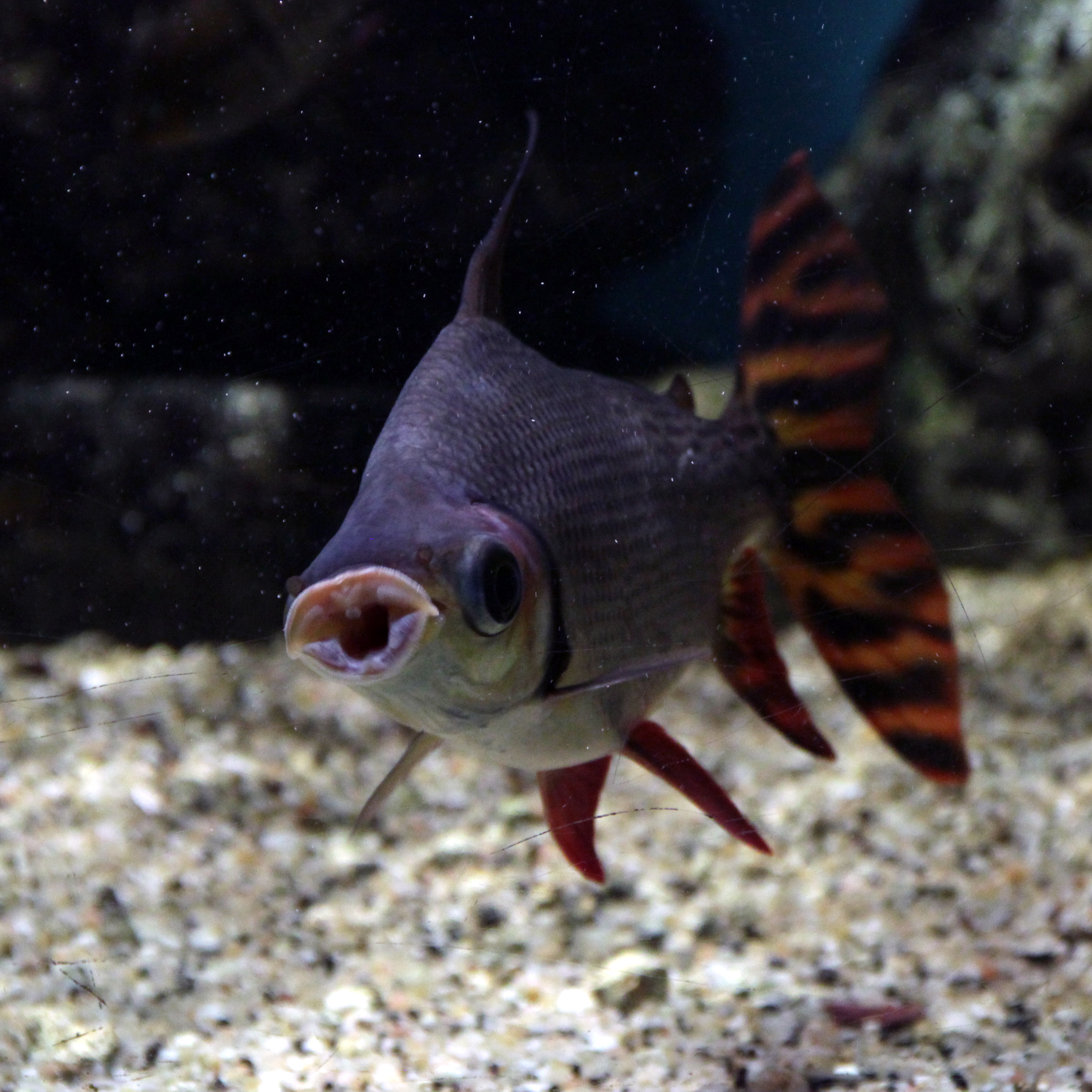
Semaprochilodus taeniurus; mouth in action

After metamorphosis from their larval stage, they develop their oral disc, a feature unique to their family. The oral disc are made up of expanded fleshy lips which bears all their teeth, which are not rooted to the jaws as in other characins. The associated structures of the skull, gill arches, and suspensorium also underwent adaptation to support this feeding apparatus. Along with adaptations of the digestive system (notably the "elaboration and elongation" of the pyloric caeca and intestines), these features allow prochilodontids to feed on detritus and aufwuchs, food sources typically exploited by invertebrates in a freshwater ecosystem. Feeding directly on the detritus and aufwuchs may have allowed prochilodontids and curimatids, which are sister groups, to become major if not dominant components of Neotropical freshwater ichthyofauna. Their feeding action reduces the amount of built-up sediment which affects the composition of invertebrate fauna in a waterway; this renders them as keystone species by their role as ecosystem engineers.

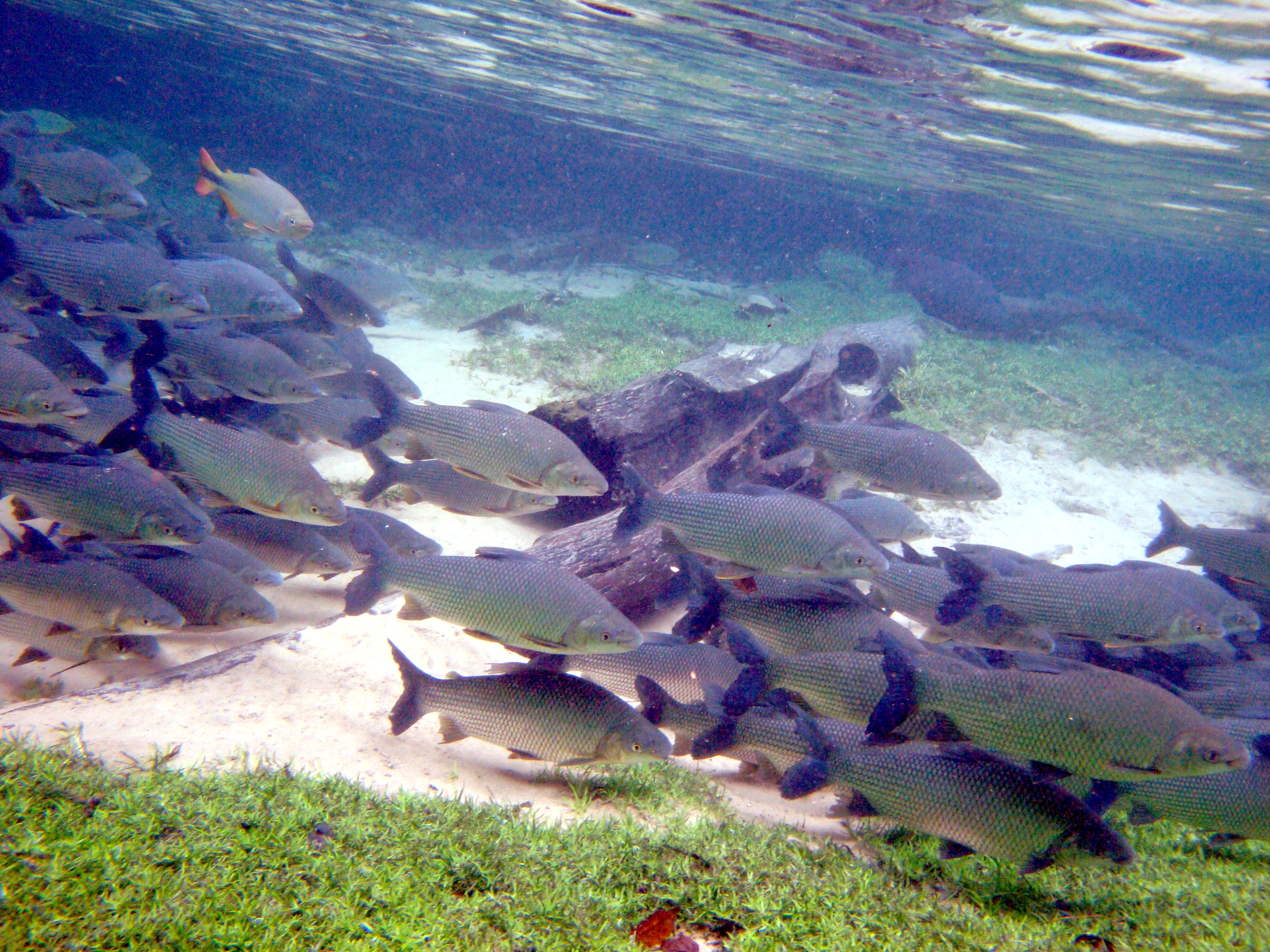
School of Prochilodus lineatus with Brycon hilarii

They can make audible grunting noises that have been described as resembling the sound of a motorbike.

Prochilodontids undergo regular migration, thought to be related to foraging and reproduction: daily migrations in the Paraná River may reach distances of 43 km (27 mi), longer migrations may stretch for at least 1,500 km (930 mi), and they may leap for several meters to overcome obstacles, These journeys allow for significant levels of gene flow (reflected in high levels of genetic homogeneity within species of prochilodontids, despite inhabiting disparate river basins) along with the transport of nutrients and energy when they are hunted down by less migratory predators.

Biogeographical evidence suggests that Prochilodus may have retained its bauplan for at least 8 million years and possibly longer: Prochilodus magdalenae inhabits waterways which were separated from other river basins by the northern portions of the Andean Cordilleras by the late Miocene, around 11.8 to 10.0 million years ago. Additionally, Prochilodontidae may have evolved much earlier than that: fossils of the derived curimatid Cyphocharax mosesi were dated to the Oligocene, at least 22.5 million years ago, which suggests the majority of Curimatidae's genera had by then evolved. As its sister group, Prochilodontidae is thought to have emerged by that time too. Thus, it is thought that Prochilodus and the common ancestor of Semaprochilodus and Ichthyoelephas were extant by at least the Miocene; other fish genera, such as the pacu Colossoma and the catfish Phractocephalus, possess fossil evidence suggesting they too were extant by that epoch.

== Relation to humans ==
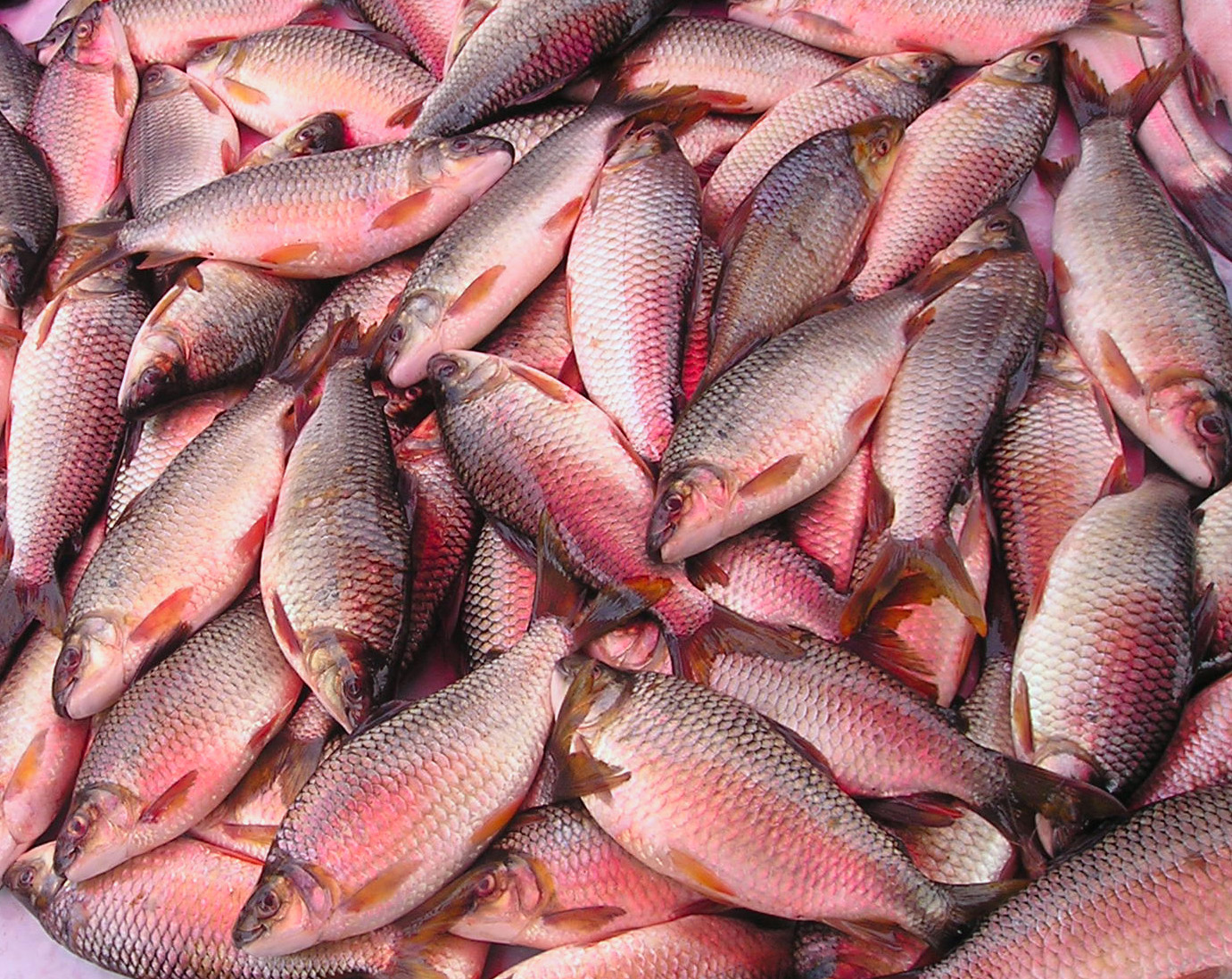
Ichthyoelephas humeralis in a fish market

Their abundance is reflected by their prominence in South American freshwater fisheries: single species of prochilodontids often make up more than 50% of the total catch of fish in a river basin, and may sometimes reach 95% of the fishery in some regions. Prochilodontid species are important components in fisheries from Venezuela to Argentina. Their value as food may have led to their introduction in Papua New Guinea.
