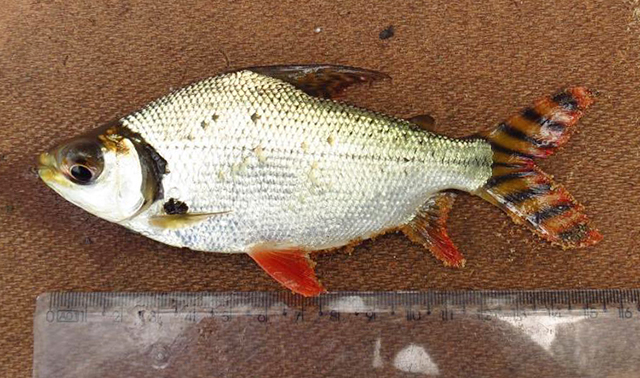

Conservation status
- Least Concern (IUCN 3.1)

Scientific classification
- Kingdom: Animalia
- Phylum: Chordata
- Class: Actinopterygii
- Order: Characiformes
- Family: Prochilodontidae
- Genus: Semaprochilodus
- Species: S. brama

Binomial name
- Semaprochilodus brama (Valenciennes, 1850)

Synonyms
- Prochilodus brama Valenciennes, 1850; Semaprochilodus squamilentus Fowler, 1941

= Semaprochilodus brama =

Species of fish

Semaprochilodus brama is a species of freshwater ray-finned fish belonging to the family Prochilodontidae, the bocachicos or flannel-mouth characiformes. This species is restricted to Brazil.

== Taxonomy ==
Semaprochilodus brama was first formally described as Prochilodus brama in 1850 by the French zoologist Achille Valenciennes, with its type locality given as the Rio Tocantins at São João das Duas Barras in Pará, Brazil. In 1941, Henry Weed Fowler described a new species which he called Semaprochilodus squamilentus from the Rio Parnahyba, Therezina, Piauhy in Brazil. When he described this species Fowler proposed a new genus Semaprochilodus and he designated S. squalimentus as its type species. S. squamilentus is now considered to be a synonym of Prochilodus brama. The genus Semaprochilodus is classified within the family Prochilodontidae, the bocachicos or flannel-mouth characiformes, within the suborder Characoidei of the order Characiformes.

== Etymology ==
Semaprochilodus brama is the senior synonym of Semaprochilodus squamilentus, the type species of the genus Semaprochilodus. The name of this genus combines the Greek sêma, which means "sign", as in semaphore, with the genus name Prochilodus, an allusion to the black banded caudal fin which resembles a flag. The specific name, brama, is derived from abramis, a Greek word for bream, as used in the scientific binomial of the common bream (Abramis brama).

== Description ==
Semaprochilodus brama has a maximum total length of 54 cm (21 in) and a maximum weight of 2.6 kg (5.7 lb).

== Distribution and habitat ==
Semaprochilodus brama is endemic to Brazil, where it occurs in the drainage basins of the Tocantins and Xingu in the states of Goiás, Mato Grosso, Pará and Tocantins. This species is found in a variety of environments, including streams, lakes, and riverbanks.
