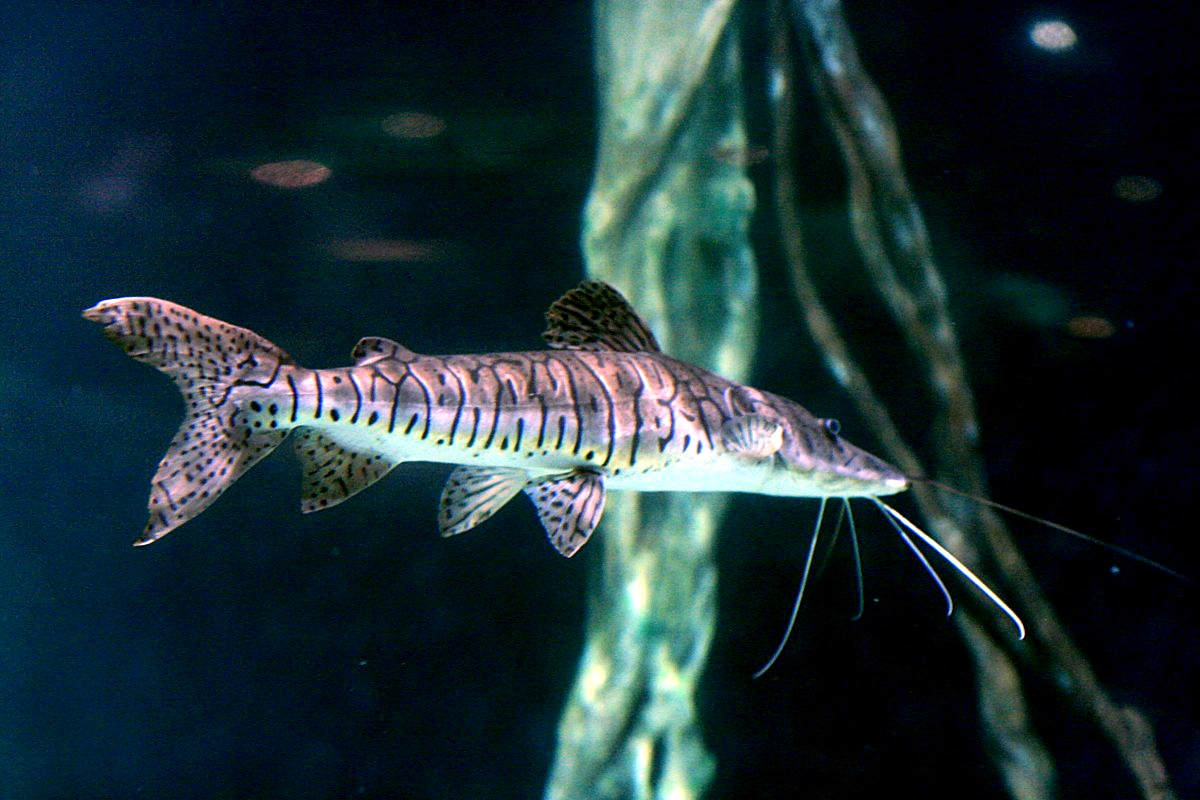
- Pseudoplatystoma tigrinum

Scientific classification
- Kingdom: Animalia
- Phylum: Chordata
- Class: Actinopterygii
- Division: Teleostei
- Order: Siluriformes
- Family: Pimelodidae
- Genus: Pseudoplatystoma; Bleeker, 1862

Type species
- Silurus fasciatus Linnaeus, 1766

Synonyms
- Hemiplatystoma Bleeker, 1862

= Pseudoplatystoma =

Genus of fishes

Pseudoplatystoma is a genus of severa catfish species in South America; part of the Pimelodidae family. The species are known by a number of different common names. They typically inhabit major rivers where they prefer the main channels and tend to stay at maximum depth, but some species can also be seen in lakes, flooded forests, and other freshwater habitats. They have robust bodies and are important food fish. Recently, their populations have declined due to a variety of factors, including overfishing and habitat destruction due to the construction of hydroelectric dams.

== Nomenclature ==
Pseudoplatystoma is a monophyletic genus of catfishes. P. fasciatum was the first species to be described, under the name Siluris fasciatus. In 1829, P. corruscans was described under the name Platystoma corruscans, and over a decade later, P. tigrinum was described as Platystoma tigrinum. In 1862, Pseudoplatystoma was described and these species transferred to it, with P. fasciatum as type species.

Unrecognized species of Pseudoplatystoma have been included under the names P. fasciatum and P. tigrinum for decades. This genus traditionally contained only three species until 2007; currently, eight species are in this genus. P. orinocoense, P. magdaleniatum, and P. reticulatum were formerly recognized as P. fasciatum, but are now recognized as distinct species. P. metaense is also now recognized as a distinct species from P. tigrinum.

Two clades are recognized within the genus. One is the P. fasciatum clade which includes P. fasciatum, P. orinocoense, P. magdaleniatum, P. reticulatum, and P. corruscans. Within this clade, P. fasciatum and P. punctifer are sister species, and P. orinocoense is sister to the clade formed by these two species. The other, the P. tigrinum clade, includes only P. tigrinum and P. metaense. They are differentiated by anatomical characters.

The intergeneric relationships of this genus are well established. It forms a monophyletic group with Sorubim, Sorubimichthys, Hemisorubim, and Zungaro. Of these genera, Hemisorubim is most closely related to Pseudoplatystoma.

=== Common names ===
In their native waters, these fish may be called surubí in Guaraní, especially in Paraguay, where still both Spanish and Guaraní are spoken. This name is also used in some Spanish-speaking countries and in Portuguese-speaking Brazil (surubi or surubim). In Peruvian Spanish, they are called doncella or zúngaro. P. corruscans may be called moleque or pintado. They often are referred to in the vernacular as bagre rayado/rajado or pintadillo/pintado (tiger catfish or tiger–shovelnose). P. corruscans, P. fasciatum, and P. tigrinum are also known as spotted sorubim, barred sorubim, and tiger sorubim, respectively. This genus is collectively referred to as the tiger shovelnose catfish in the aquarium hobby, as the species in this genus are relatively easy to confuse.

== Description ==
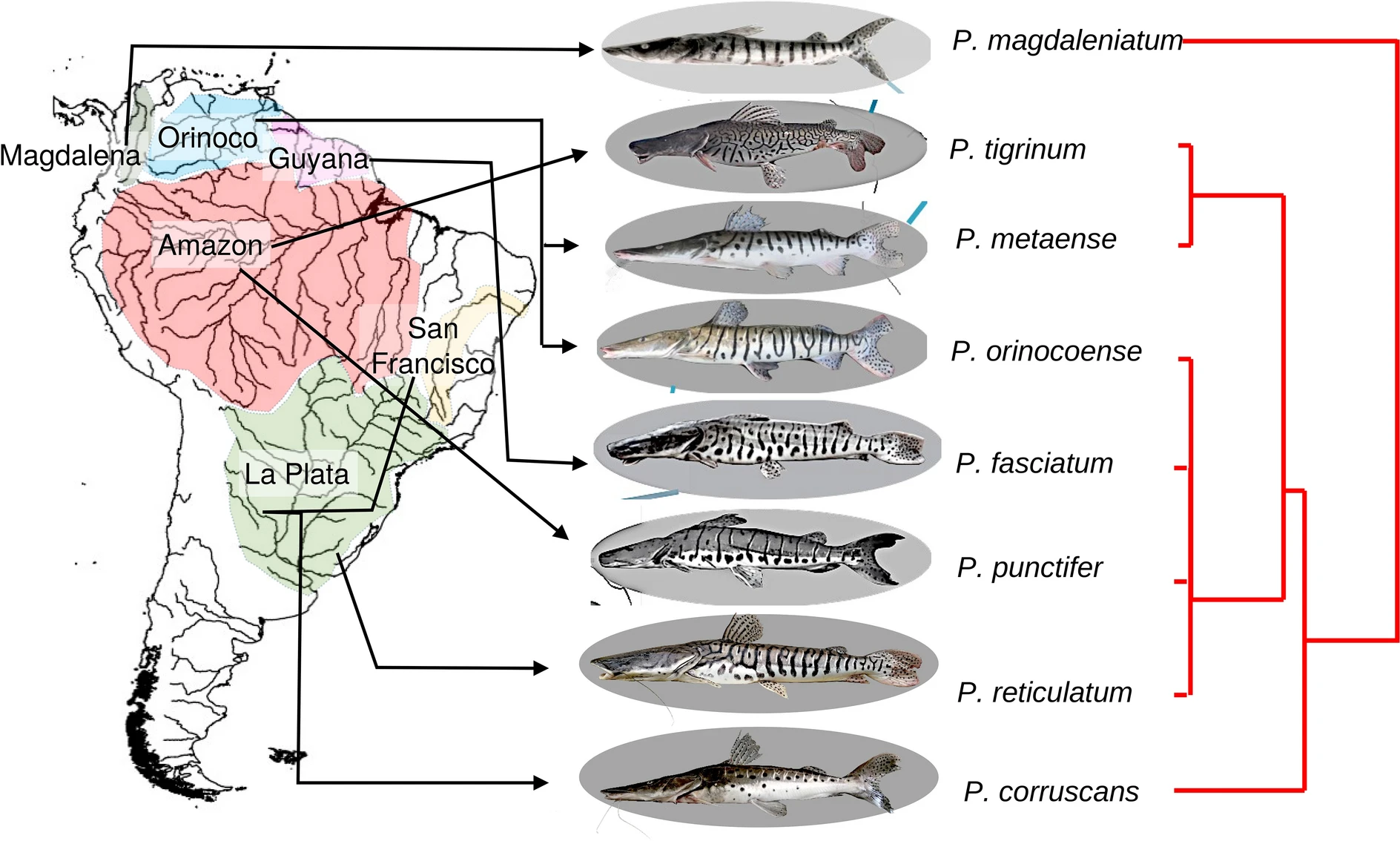
Combined distribution map and phylogeny of Pseudoplatystoma spp.

Pseudoplatystoma species are all large and boldly striped or spotted catfishes. They are familiar due to their distinctively marked color patterns. They are also recognized due to a depressed head, an occipital process extending backward to contact the predorsal plate, and a very long fontanel.

After gonadal maturation, females tend to grow faster than males. They have a large, depressed head with an expandable mouth. The eyes and teeth are small. They have dorsal and pectoral fin spines; P. fasciatum also has an additional, smaller, dorsal spinelet preceding the dorsal spine. They exhibit typical barbels of catfish, the maxillary barbels sometimes being quite long, especially in juveniles.

The currently recognized species in this genus include:

- Pseudoplatystoma corruscans (Spix & Agassiz, 1829) (spotted sorubim); has a body covered by large spots in six to eight rows with four to 13 pale vertical bars. The adipose fin contains five to 10 or no spots, the caudal fin has few spots. It reaches a maximum size of 114 cm (45 in) TL.
- Pseudoplatystoma fasciatum (Linnaeus, 1766) (barred sorubim); has 10–11 dark vertical bars that are relatively wider than other species of the Amazon, with fewer white vertical bars than dark ones; the pectoral fins and pelvic fins are darker with few or no spots; and the skull is at least one-sixth narrower than other species. It reaches a maximum of 90 cm (35 in) in total length (TL).
- Pseudoplatystoma magdaleniatum Buitrago-Suárez & Burr, 2007; has wide, straight, dark vertical bars on its sides. No loops occur on the nape and associated areas. The pectoral fin has no spots, the dorsal fin has few or no spots, and the adipose has six or seven large spots. It has a maximum recorded length of 100 cm (39 in) TL.
- Pseudoplatystoma metaense Buitrago-Suárez & Burr, 2007;has dark spots randomly distributed over the dusky region of its body; also, no more than five straight dark vertical bars are found on the side of the body. The adipose fin has fewer spots (five to seven) than in P. tigrinum (eight to 10). The pectoral and pelvic fins are pale without any dusky pigmentation. It has a maximum recorded length of about 53 cm (21 in) TL.
- Pseudoplatystoma orinocoense Buitrago-Suárez & Burr, 2007; has straight, vertical bars on its body, longer than those of P. faciatum and P. punctifer, that extend to or connect dorsally. The bars of the anterior region extend below the dusky dorsolateral area. Usually, no spots are seen below the lateral line, though some individuals may have two or three. It has a maximum recorded length of 49 cm (19 in) TL.
- Pseudoplatystoma punctifer (Castelnau, 1855)
- Pseudoplatystoma reticulatum (C. H. Eigenmann & Eigenmann, 1889) (barred sorubim); named for its pattern; it has loop-like dark bars forming a reticulated pattern, never straight as in P. fasciatum and P. orinocoense. Its dark, loop–like bars join those in the dorsal region of the body forming distinct cells. It also has longer loop–like dark bars, extending far below the lateral line. The head shows either spots or loops. The anal fin is always with spots. The lower jaw is pointed. It has a maximum recorded length of about 60 cm (24 in) TL.
- Pseudoplatystoma tigrinum (Valenciennes, 1840) (tiger sorubim); distinguished by the presence of loop–like bands connecting to, or extending to, the dorsal region and continuing onto other side of body; loop–like bars form cells. The adipose fin also has some loop-like bands and spots, but no discrete dark spots occur on the sides of the body. It reaches a maximum size of 130 cm (51 in) TL.

Juvenile Pseudoplatystoma fish are quite different in appearance from adults, distinct in patterning and coloration; the juvenile is dark on its back with an obvious boundary between the white of its sides and belly; also, the stripes of P. fasciatum and P. tigrinum have not developed, being present as spots. The adult color is brown-olive, with about 13 or 14 dark transverse bands reaching up to the belly, which is white with a few dark spots.

== Distribution and habitat ==
The distribution of Pseudoplatystoma species includes the great river basins of South America: the Amazon, Orinoco, Paraná, São Francisco, Magdalena, Rupununi, Essequibo, and Suriname Rivers. They can also be found in the Cuiabá river, located in the Brazilian State of Mato Grosso.They have not been reported from river basins draining into the Pacific. P. fasciatum inhabits the Guyana region, including the Essequibo and Suriname Rivers and their tributaries, in Guyana, Suriname, and French Guiana. P. tigrinum is found in the Amazon River in Brazil, Colombia, Ecuador, Peru, and Venezuela. P. corruscans originates from the Paraná and São Francisco Rivers in Argentina, Brazil, Paraguay, and Uruguay. P. orinocoense is named for and endemic to the Orinoco River of Venezuela. P. metaense is distributed in the Orinoco River in Colombia and Venezuela; it is named for the Meta River, the type locality, a tributary of the Orinoco River. P. magdaleniatum is named for and endemic to the Magdalena River drainage, including the Cauca River of Colombia. P. reticulatum inhabits the central Amazon and Paraná Rivers in Argentina, Bolivia, Brazil, Paraguay, and Uruguay.

Pseudoplatystoma species live in a diverse range of habitats, such as great rivers, lakes, side channels, floating meadows, and flooded forests. P. fasciatum is found in river beds and sometimes in flooded forests. Though it is biologically similar to P. tigrinum, this fish seems to favor shadier streams. P. tigrinum occurs in estuarine zones, mainly upstream of the first rapids up to the basin's headwaters. They live in the main bed of slow or fast zones, and the juveniles particularly live in flooded forests.

== Biology ==
These fish are nocturnal hunters, primarily piscivorous, feeding on fish such as electric knifefishes, cichlids, armored loricariid catfish, and characins such as sábalos, and bogas. Being opportunistic feeders, they may also feed on crustaceans such as crabs or shrimp.

=== Reproduction ===
Pseudoplatystoma species are all migratory fish. P. orinocense and P. tigrinum make short migrations. At the end of the dry season, P. tigrinum can migrate at the same time as its prey, and then return at the end of the rainy season.

The migration of P. corruscans is heavily tied to flooding. The greatest reproductive activity, the highest rate of development of gonads, and the most energy spent in migration happens when rainfall occurs.

== Relationship to humans ==
Pseudoplatystoma species are of considerable economic value; all are sold in fish markets throughout South America. They are important food fish for human consumption. P. fasciatum has a succulent, yellowish flesh without "stray" bones. P. tigrinum is the most important catfish in gill-net fisheries of Guaporé and Marmoré Rivers. These fish are being overfished in their range, and uncontrolled fishing possibly has led to the disappearance of Pseudoplatystoma species in some local tributaries of the Amazon, Orinoco, and Magdalena. In the Argentine province of Entre Ríos alone, about 27,000 tonnes of Pseudoplatystoma species are harvested every year, comprising 70 to 80% of the total capture there, mostly concentrated on the fishing area near the city of Victoria, opposite Rosario, Santa Fe.

The capture of P. corruscans has declined greatly due to changes in their environment. This fish has a high commercial value due to the excellent quality of its flesh, its high marketability, and its marked participation in commercial fishing. Spawning of this fish can be induced with hormones, with a high potential for commercial production.

P. fasciatum and P. tigrinum are often found in public aquaria.

=== In the aquarium ===
Juvenile Pseudoplatystoma fish are marked as ornamental fish in both North and South America, but they are usually at a size too small for certain identification, but more than one species may be imported. These species appear in the aquarium hobby, where they are most often sold under the name "tiger shovelnose" or "tiger shovelnose catfish". These fish prove to be hardy, but their large adult size is problematic for both matters of housing and finding suitable tankmates that will not be consumed. With the appetite these fish have, finding enough good food may present some difficulty.

== See also ==
- List of freshwater aquarium fish species
