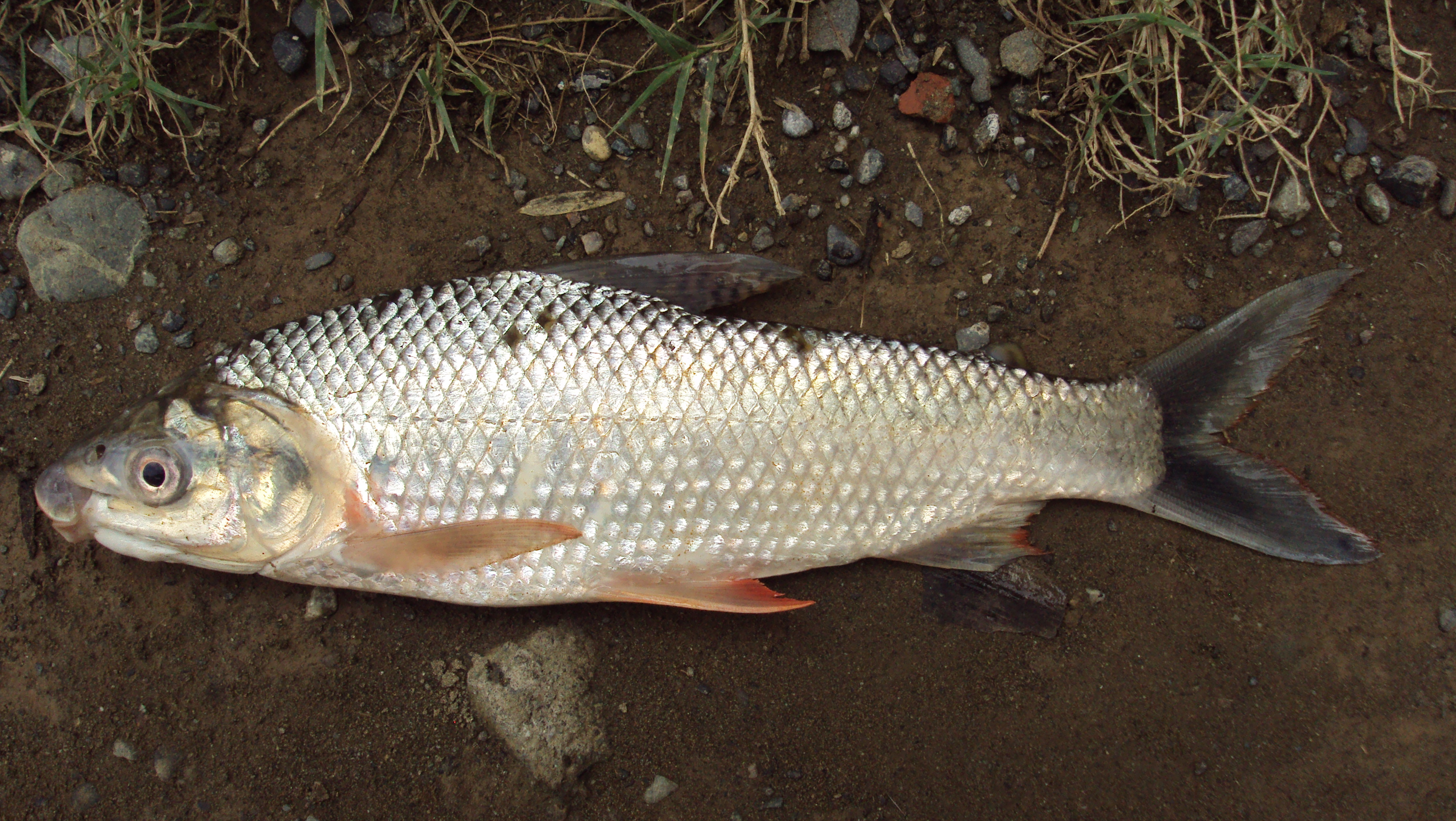

Conservation status
- Data Deficient (IUCN 3.1)

Scientific classification
- Kingdom: Animalia
- Phylum: Chordata
- Class: Actinopterygii
- Order: Characiformes
- Family: Prochilodontidae
- Genus: Prochilodus
- Species: P. magdalenae

Binomial name
- Prochilodus magdalenae Steindachner, 1879

Synonyms
- Prochilodus asper magdalenae Steindachner, 1879; Prochilodus beani Eigenmann, 1907; Prochilodus eigenmanni Ahl, 1937; Prochilodus reticulatus magdalenae Steindachner, 1879; Prochilodus steindachneri Eigenmann, 1922

= Prochilodus magdalenae =

Species of fish

Prochilodus magdalenae is a tropical prochilodontid freshwater fish from Colombia. It is found in the Atrato, Sinú, Cauca and Magdalena Rivers. It has been measured to reach 36 cm (14 in) in standard length and 905 g (1.995 lb) in weight. They have a growing role in fisheries.
