= Pseudoplatystoma magdaleniatum =

Conservation status
- Endangered (IUCN 3.1)

Scientific classification
- Kingdom: Animalia
- Phylum: Chordata
- Class: Actinopterygii
- Order: Siluriformes
- Family: Pimelodidae
- Genus: Pseudoplatystoma
- Species: P. magdaleniatum

Binomial name
- Pseudoplatystoma magdaleniatum Buitrago-Suárez & Burr, 2007

Synonyms
- Pseudoplatystoma garciamarquezi Royero, Buitrago-Suarez, Majica, Valderrama & Galvis, 2010

Species of fish

Pseudoplatystoma magdaleniatum, the striped sorubim, is a species of long-whiskered catfish native to South America.
