= Semaprochilodus insignis =

Kissing prochilodus

Conservation status
- Least Concern (IUCN 3.1)

Scientific classification
- Kingdom: Animalia
- Phylum: Chordata
- Class: Actinopterygii
- Division: Teleostei
- Order: Characiformes
- Family: Prochilodontidae
- Genus: Semaprochilodus
- Species: S. insignis

Binomial name
- Semaprochilodus insignis (Jardine, 1841)

Synonyms
- Prochilodus insignis Jardine, 1841; Prochilodus theraponura Fowler, 1906; Semaprochilodus theraponura (Fowler 1906); Semaprochilodus squamilentus Fowler, 1941

Species of fish

Semaprochilodus insignis, the kissing prochilodus or flag-tailed prochilodus, is a species of freshwater ray-finned fish belonging to the family Prochilodontidae, the bocachicos or flannel-mouth characiformes. It is native to central and western parts of the Amazon basin. It can reach a maximum standard length of 27.5 cm (10.8 in) and weight of 560 g (1.23 lb). It generally resembles the other members of the genus Semaprochilodus, but this species possesses yellow to yellow-orange fins as opposed to the red in the other species, except for the look-alike S. kneri, which differs only in some traits of meristics and osteology. Adult S. insignis lack the dark flank spots that can be seen in adult S. taeniurus, but both species have these spots as juveniles.

The species is migratory, moving in large groups into whitewater rivers to spawn, afterwards returning to blackwater and clearwater rivers, as well as flooded forests. Its migratory habits result in a panmictic population with high genetic diversity. Ontogenetic niche shift is observed for these fish: juveniles in whitewater consume plant detritus (terrestrial plants, macrophytes, and phytoplankton) while the adults are iliophagous. P. insignis is important in fisheries, which has resulted in signs of overfishing in certain populations. and sometimes seen in the aquarium trade, but requires a relatively large tank.
