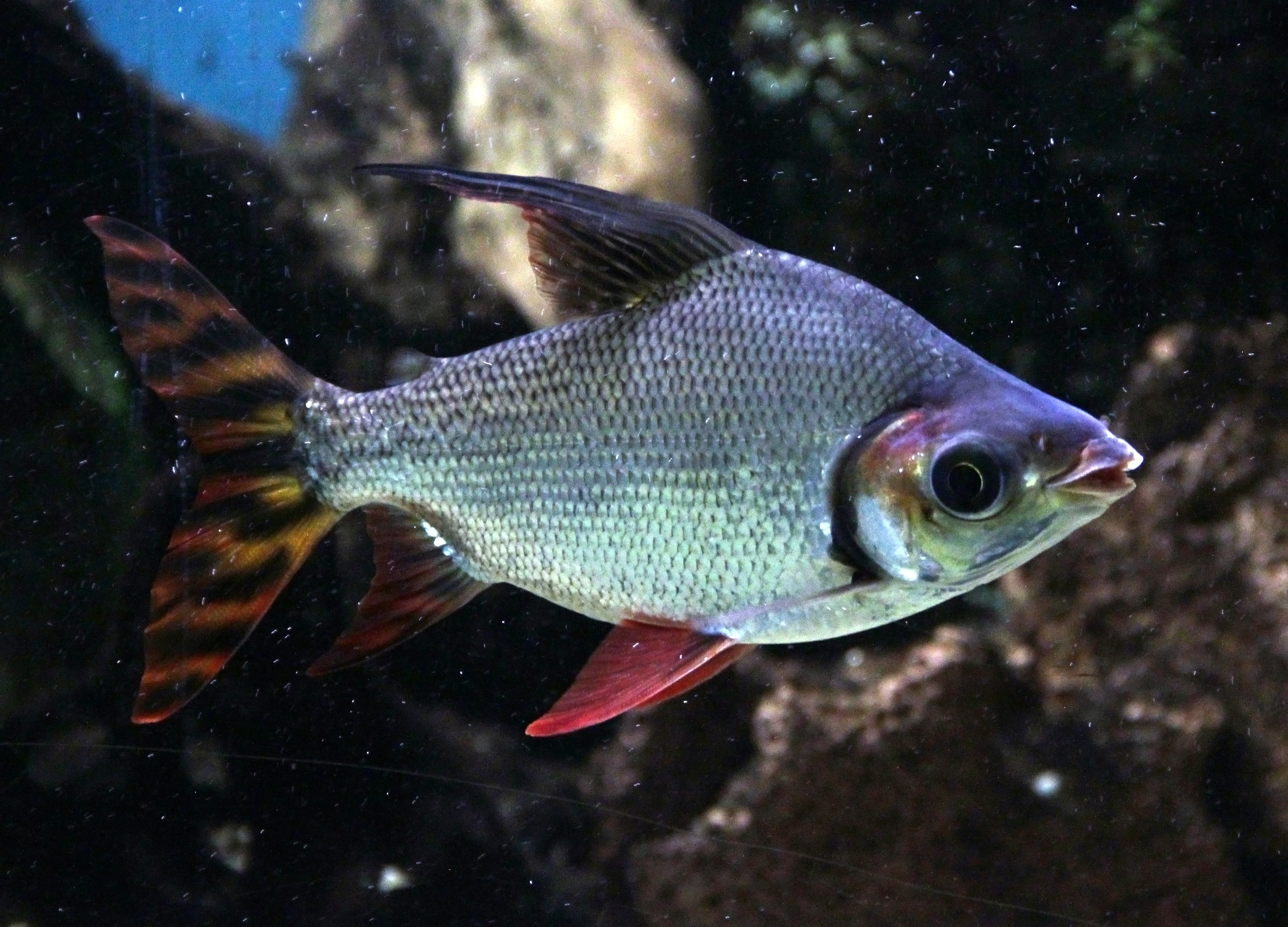
- Semaprochilodus taeniurus

Scientific classification
- Kingdom: Animalia
- Phylum: Chordata
- Class: Actinopterygii
- Order: Characiformes
- Family: Prochilodontidae
- Genus: Semaprochilodus; Fowler, 1941

Type species
- Semaprochilodus squamilentus Fowler, 1941

Species
- see text

= Semaprochilodus =

Genus of fishes

Semaprochilodus is a genus of South American freshwater ray-finned fish in the family Prochilodontidae, the bocachicos or flannel-mouthed characiformes. They have sometimes been included in the genus Prochilodus instead. Of the six species, three are from the Amazon Basin, two from the Orinoco Basin and a single from the Maroni Basin. Depending on the exact species, they reach a maximum length of 27–54 centimetres (11–21 in).

They support important fisheries and based on a review by IBAMA, they are the second (after Brachyplatystoma vaillantii) most caught fish by weight in the Brazilian Amazon.

== Taxonomy ==
Semaprochilodus is distinguished from other prochilodonts by a number of traits, being the presence of dark pigmentation on the margins of the opercle and pectoral girdle, waved horizontal striping on the flanks, 1 to 5 irregular oblique stripes on their anal fins, and notably, 5 to 15 dark stripes on the caudal fin. Particularly large members of some species, such as S. brama, may have faint tail markings or may lack them entirely.

FishBase recognizes the following species in the genus, which are found in the specified locales:

- Semaprochilodus brama (Valenciennes, 1850) (Rio Xingu and Rio Tocantins)
- Semaprochilodus insignis (Jardine, 1841) (Central Rio Amazonas, except Rio Xingu and Rio Tocantins)
- Semaprochilodus kneri (Pellegrin, 1909) (Rio Orinoco basin)
- Semaprochilodus laticeps (Steindachner, 1879) (Rio Orinoco basin)
- Semaprochilodus taeniurus (Valenciennes, 1821) (Central Amazon basin, absent from Rio Xingu and Rio Tocantins)
- Semaprochilodus varii R. M. C. Castro, 1988 (Marowijne River/Fleuve Maroni system)

Cladogram of the most parsimonious hypothesis of relationships based on morphological analysis by Castro and Vari (2008):

- Semaprochilodus
  - S. brama, S. laticeps, S. varii
  - - S. taeniurus
    - - S. kneri
      - S. insignis

Species of Semaprochilodus are mostly distinguished through the specifics of their skeletal anatomy as well as their locality, though the clade consisting of S. brama, S. laticeps, and S. varii have very dark pigmentation on their opercular border and adjoining regions of the cleithrum.
