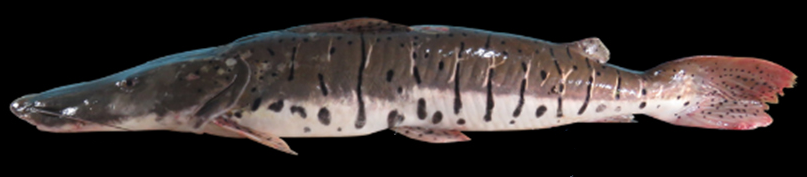

Conservation status
- Least Concern (IUCN 3.1)

Scientific classification
- Kingdom: Animalia
- Phylum: Chordata
- Class: Actinopterygii
- Division: Teleostei
- Order: Siluriformes
- Family: Pimelodidae
- Genus: Pseudoplatystoma
- Species: P. punctifer

Binomial name
- Pseudoplatystoma punctifer (Castelnau, 1855)

Synonyms
- Platystoma punctifer; Pseudoplatystoma fasciatum punctifer; Pseudoplatystoma fasciatum intermedium; Pseudoplatystoma fasciatum brevifile; Pseudoplatystoma fasciatum nigricans

= Pseudoplatystoma punctifer =

Species of fish

Pseudoplatystoma punctifer, the spotted tiger shovelnose catfish, is a species of long-whiskered catfish native to the Amazon basin, in Bolivia, Brazil, Colombia, Ecuador, Peru, and Venezuela. It is a commercially farmed species, and it is difficult to harvest as it appears to be highly selective with its diet and exhibits cannibalistic behaviors. Other behaviors and developmental patterns vary based on both diet as well as parental behaviors that influence the organisms development from the Larval stage.

This species reaches a maximum of 140 cm (55 in) in total length; 37–40 vertebrae.
