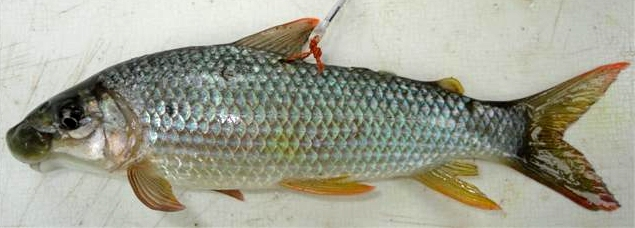
- Ichthyoelephas longirostris

Scientific classification
- Kingdom: Animalia
- Phylum: Chordata
- Class: Actinopterygii
- Order: Characiformes
- Family: Prochilodontidae
- Genus: Ichthyoelephas; Posada, 1909

Type species
- Ichthyoelephas patalo, (a synonym of Ichthyoelephas longirostris) Posada, 1909

= Ichthyoelephas =

Genus of fishes

Ichthyoelephas is a genus of South American freshwater ray-finned fishes belonging to the family Prochilodontidae, the bocachicos or flannel-mouthed characiformes.

There are two species in the genus: I. humeralis reaches a length of at least 40 cm (1.3 ft) and is found in the Santiago, Chimbo, and Guayas river basins in Ecuador, and I. longirostris reaches a length of 80 cm (2.6 ft) and is found in the Cauca–Magdalena river basin in Colombia, and additionally reported from the Rio Ranchería.

They feed on algae and detritus (aufwuchs) that are taken off rocks with their fleshy lips. They are commercially important food fish.

== Species ==
There are two species:

- Ichthyoelephas humeralis (Günther, 1860)
- Ichthyoelephas longirostris (Steindachner, 1879)
