= USS Sabalo =

USS Sabalo has been the name of more than one United States Navy ship, and may refer to:

- USS Sabalo (SP-225), a patrol vessel in commission from 1917 to 1919
- USS Sabalo (SS-302), a submarine in commission from 1945 to 1946 and from 1951 to 1971
