= Sábalo =

Sábalo or sabalo are Spanish common names of many fish species, most of them from South America, but also a few found elsewhere:

- Alosa alosa (Spain)
- Arius heudelotii (Mauritania), a species of Arius
- Brycon spp. (northern South America, especially Ecuador) — B. alburbus, B. atrocaudatus, B. behreae, B. cephalus, B. coyexi, B. dentex, B. falcatus, B. melanopterus, B. oligolepis, B. pesu, B. stolzmanni, B. striatulus, B. whitei
- Chanos chanos (Southeast Asia and Mexico), a.k.a. "milkfish"
- Elops saurus (Dominican Republic), a.k.a. "ladyfish" or "ten-pounder"
- Megalops atlanticus (Puerto Rico, Cuba, Venezuela, United States, etc.), a.k.a. "tarpon"
- Prochilodus lineatus (Argentina, Bolivia, Paraguay, Uruguay)
- Salminus hilarii (Peru), a species of Salminus
