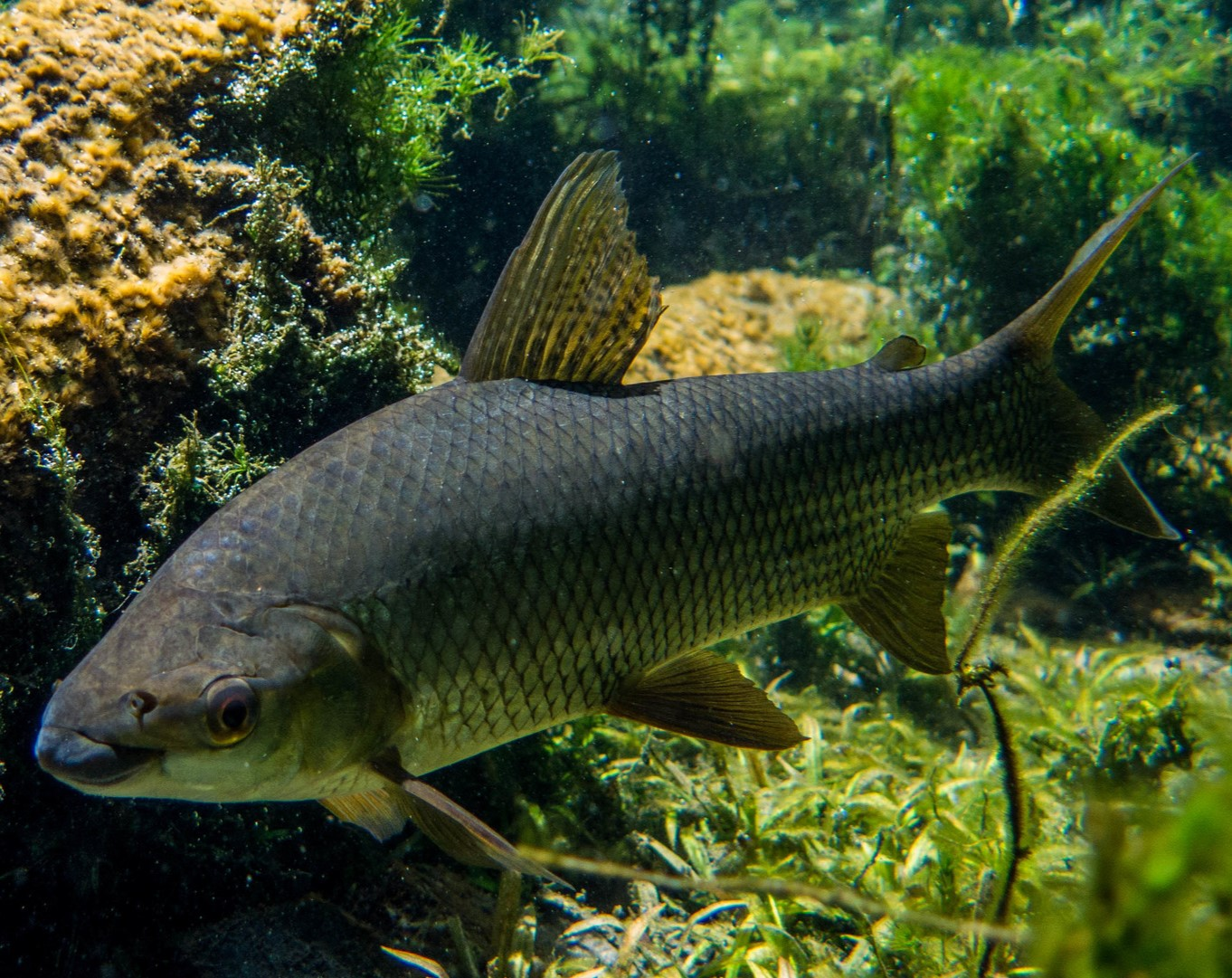

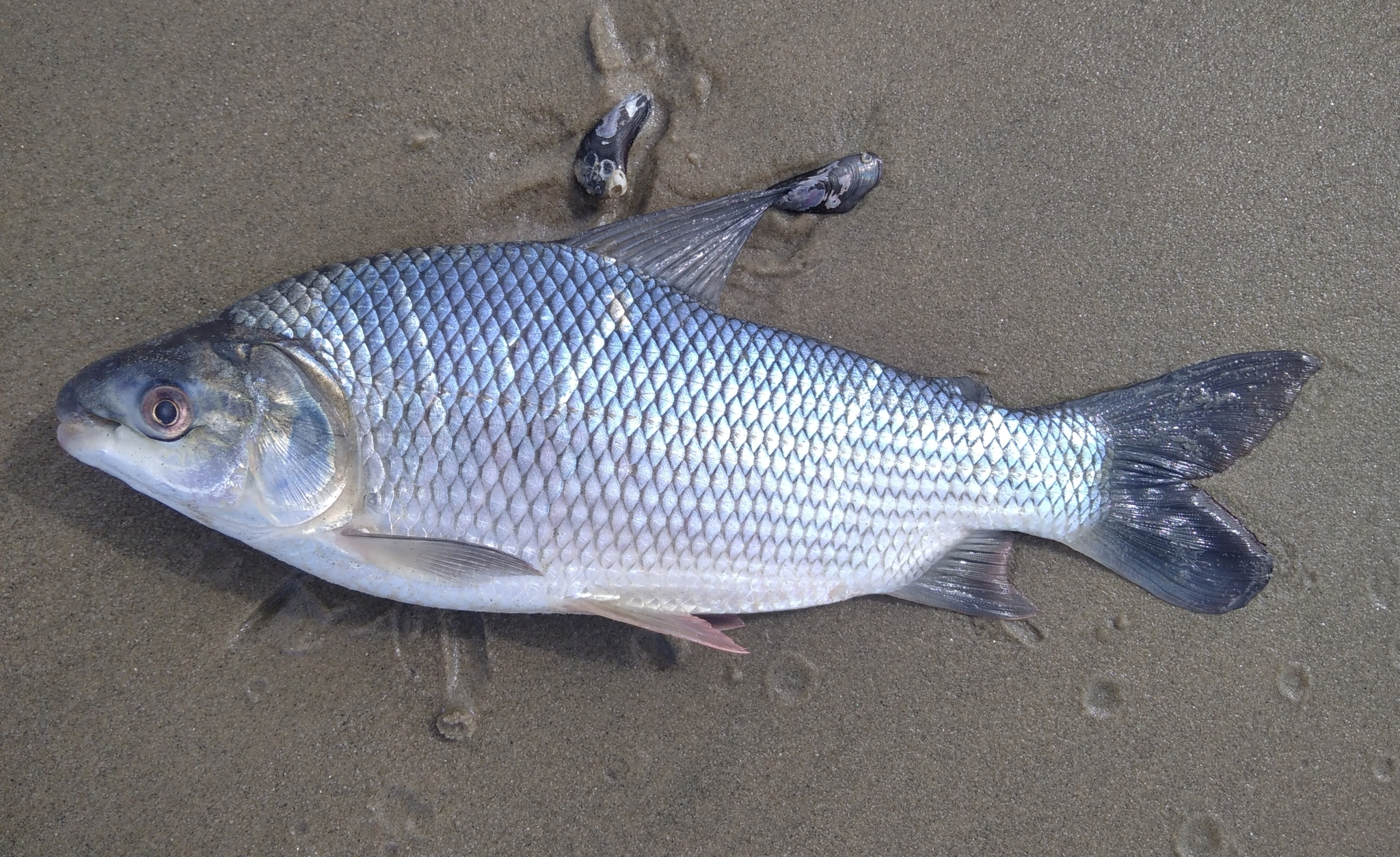

Conservation status
- Least Concern (IUCN 3.1)

Scientific classification
- Kingdom: Animalia
- Phylum: Chordata
- Class: Actinopterygii
- Division: Teleostei
- Order: Characiformes
- Family: Prochilodontidae
- Genus: Prochilodus
- Species: P. lineatus

Binomial name
- Prochilodus lineatus (Valenciennes, 1837)

Synonyms
- Paca lineatus Valenciennes, 1837; Pacu lineatus Valenciennes, 1837; Prochilodus scrofa Steindachner, 1881; Prochilodus platensis Holmberg, 1891; Salmo novemradiatus Larrañaga, 1923

= Prochilodus lineatus =

Species of characiforme fish

Prochilodus lineatus, the streaked prochilod, is a species of ray-finned fish in the family Prochilodontidae. It is native to the Paraná-Paraguay and Paraíba do Sul river basins in South America. It performs long breeding migrations and supports very important fisheries.

== Nomenclature ==
The Latin name is derived from Greek; the generic name is likely a combination of pro ("first", "in front of"), χεῖλος (cheilos; "lip"), and ὀδούς (odus; "tooth"). The specific name lineatus means "lined" or "streaked".

It is known by many common names throughout its range, and these names may be used across borders. Curimbatá, Grumatá, or derivatives thereof are often used; these names may be taken from Guarani. Its common name in Spanish is sábalo, though other species of fish also have the common name sábalo; P. lineatus is therefore distinguished as sábalo jetón (colloquial Spanish for "big-mouth") or sábalo rayado. Other common names include chupabarro ("mud-sucker") and lamepiedras ("stone-licker"), referencing its feeding behavior.

== Appearance ==
Prochilodus lineatus reaches up to 80 cm (2.6 ft) in length - though it is commonly around 45 cm (1.5 ft) long - and 9 kg (20 lb) in weight. Its body is tall and compressed, greenish-gray (lighter on the belly), with yellowish green fins. Its mouth is circular and projects towards the front; it has two series of small teeth.

== Distribution ==
The species is found in the Paraná-Paraguay basin, Paraíba do Sul, Lagoa dos Patos and surrounding rivers, the Mar Chiquita basin and surrounding rivers, Rio Salado, and Laguna de Chascomus.

== Ecology ==
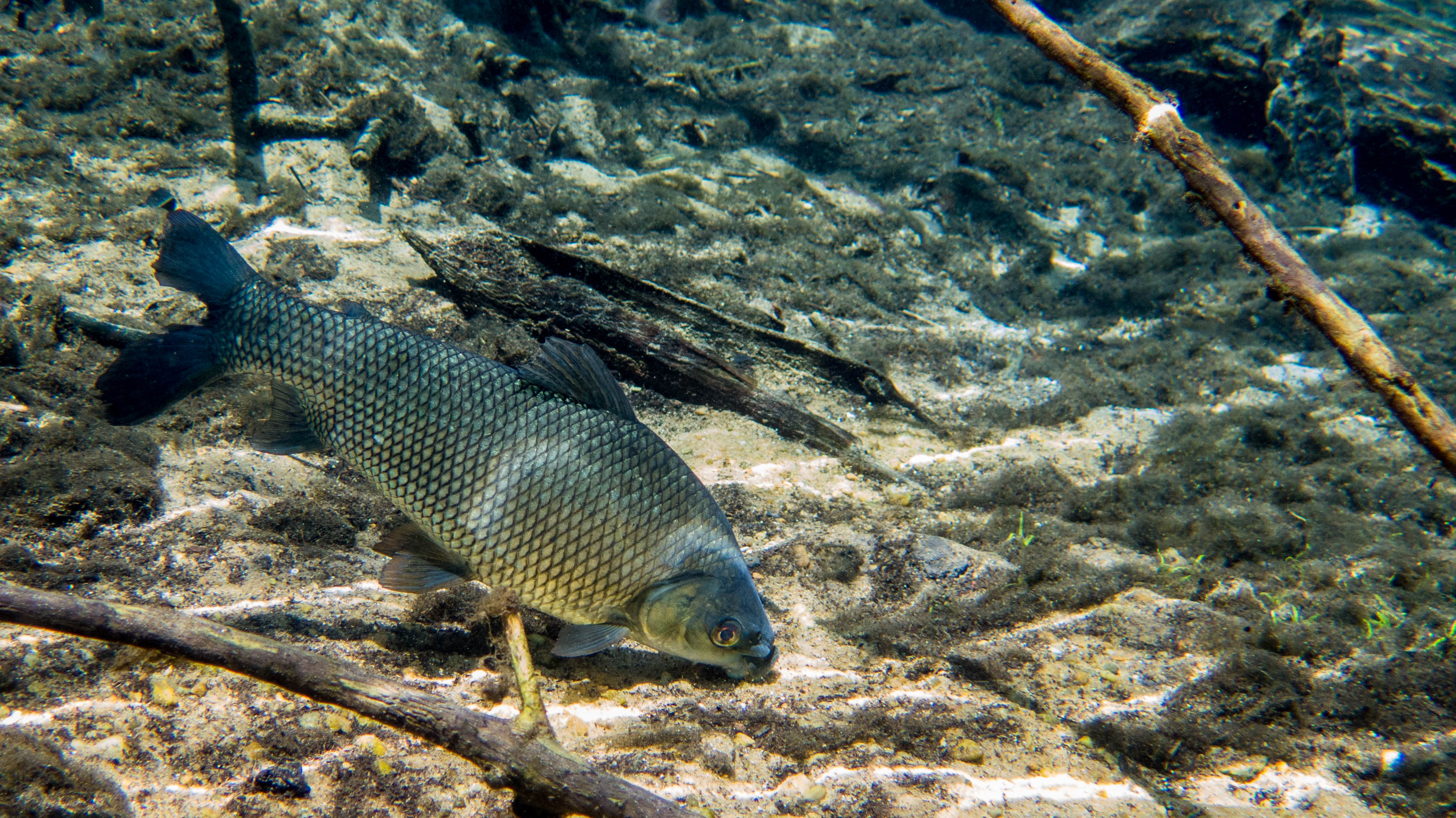
A curimba feeding on sediment

The species may comprise more than 50% of the fish biomass in a river system. The fish feeds on biofilm, for which its mouth is especially adapted to scrape from the river bottom. The species also feeds on detritus, being illiophagous. It selects detritus rich in amino acids and is able to selectively avoid mineral matter and refractory organic matter. The species is highly migratory, looking for warm waters during the spring in order to lay its eggs. While spawning, the fish may form pairs, and males may stay near the nest to guard the eggs.

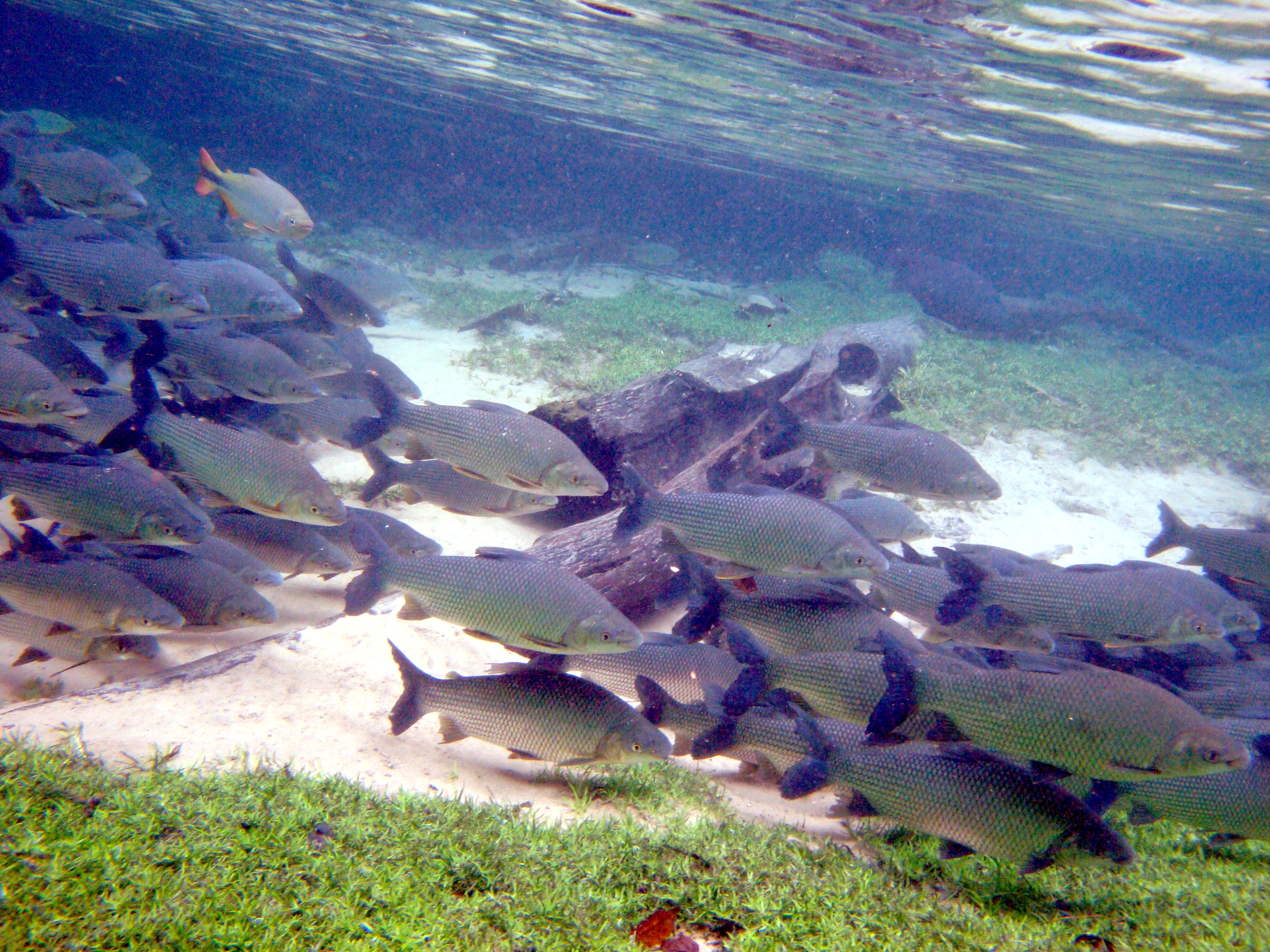
A school of curimba (with Brycon hillarii) in Rio Da Prata, Mato Grosso do Sul

== In the Paraná River ==
Prochilodus lineatus is considered the key species of the Paraná River, since it forms the base of the food chain that ends with larger fish like the surubí catfish (Pseudoplatystoma) and golden dorado (Salminus brasiliensis). Regulations in place in Santa Fe and Entre Ríos, Argentina, have proven ineffective to preserve the species, which is being severely exploited, both for internal consumption and for export. Experts estimate that capturing 20,000 tonnes of sábalo per year is the upper limit of sustainability. Exports, however, of about 13,000 tonnes in 1998, grew to 34,000 tonnes in 2004, after the depreciation of the Argentine peso caused by the economic crisis tripled its local value.

As the fish population dwindles, fishermen who depend on their captures for their livelihood are keeping smaller specimens, often not mature and which therefore have had no time to reproduce.

Widespread disregard of prescribed net sizes and the presence of illegal processing plants, which the local governments do not control, have compelled environmental groups to protest. The issue turned into a jurisdiction conflict when Santa Fe tightened the regulations in 2005, forbidding the capture of sábalos under 42 cm (17 in) long, while Entre Ríos kept the limit looser at 40 cm (16 in). On July 13, about 400 fishermen blocked the Rosario access to the Rosario-Victoria Bridge that joins the two provinces. On August 1, after Entre Ríos matched its regulations with those of Santa Fe, 300 fishermen and freezing plant workers from Victoria did the same. They were pressured, according to certain claims, by the threat of unemployment if their plants cannot fill their export quotas.

In October 2006, largely to facilitate the reproduction of sábalo, the legislative branch of Santa Fe attempted to pass a temporary ban on commercial fishing in the Paraná. This ban was vetoed by the executive, as it had no counterpart in the neighbouring Entre Ríos. On 21 December 2006, the national government banned exports of fish of the Paraná River for eight months starting on 1 January 2007.
