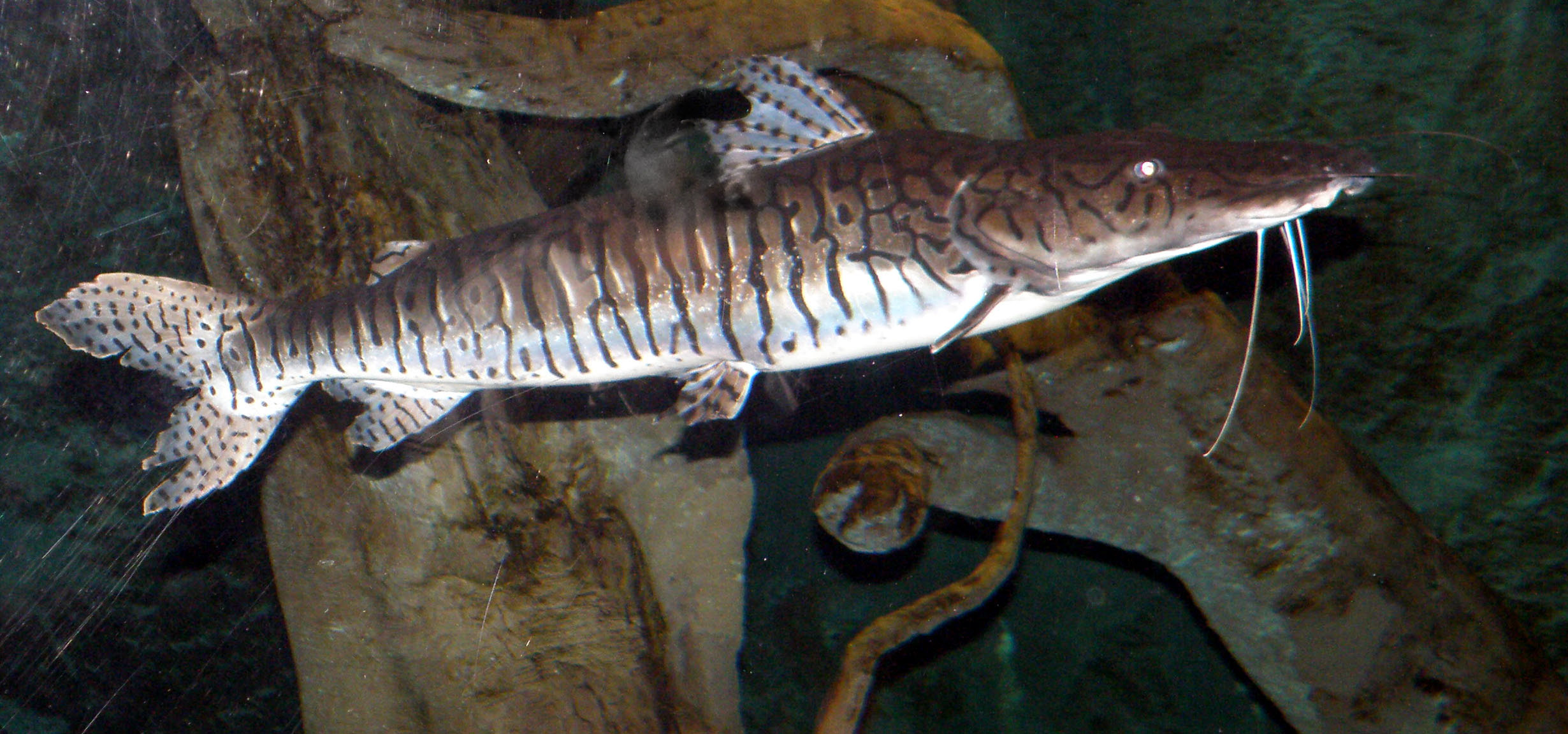
- Pseudoplatystoma reticulatum

Conservation status
- Least Concern (IUCN 3.1)

Scientific classification
- Kingdom: Animalia
- Phylum: Chordata
- Class: Actinopterygii
- Order: Siluriformes
- Family: Pimelodidae
- Genus: Pseudoplatystoma
- Species: P. reticulatum

Binomial name
- Pseudoplatystoma reticulatum C. H. Eigenmann & R. S. Eigenmann, 1889

= Pseudoplatystoma reticulatum =

Barred sorubim

Species of fish

The barred sorubim (Pseudoplatystoma reticulatum; Spanish: surubí atigrado) is a species of long-whiskered catfish native to the Río de la Plata basin and Amazon basin in South America. It reaches up to about 60 cm (2 ft) in length.
