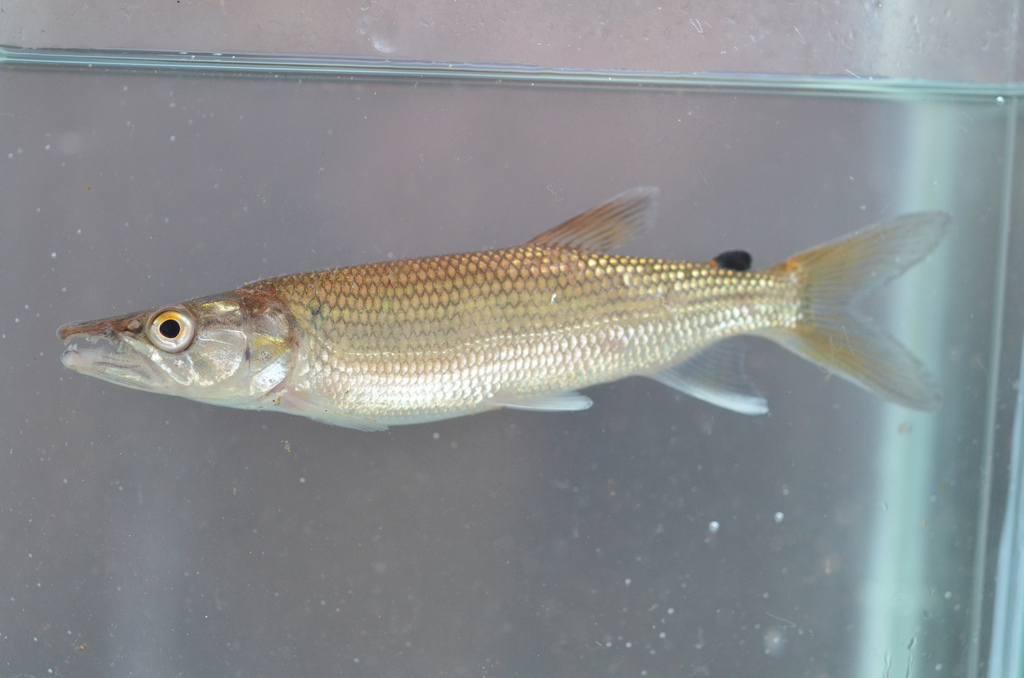

Conservation status
- Least Concern (IUCN 3.1)

Scientific classification
- Kingdom: Animalia
- Phylum: Chordata
- Class: Actinopterygii
- Order: Characiformes
- Family: Hepsetidae
- Genus: Hepsetus
- Species: H. lineatus

Binomial name
- Hepsetus lineatus Pellegrin, 1926

Synonyms
- Hepsetus lineata (Pellegrin, 1926); Hepsetus odoe lineata (Pellegrin, 1926); Sarcodaces odoe lineata Pellegrin, 1926

= Hepsetus lineatus =

Species of fish

Hepsetus lineatus, known as the Kafue pike, is a species of freshwater fish in the Hepsetidae family of the order Characiformes. It is an African river-dwelling species found in Cameroon, the Republic of the Congo, the Democratic Republic of the Congo, and Gabon. It grows to a maximum of 28.3 centimetres (11.1 in) in standard length.

== Taxonomy and etymology ==
Hepsetus lineatus was first described by Jacques Pellegrin in 1926 under the basionym (original scientific name) Sarcodaces odoe lineata. The species has also been referred to by the synonyms H. odoe lineata and H. lineata. When it was originally elevated to the species level, it was incorrectly named H. lineata, then revised to H. lineatus, which is the appropriate spelling because the genus name Hepsetus is masculine.

This species is classified in the Hepsetidae family (the African pikes) in the order Characiformes. It is also known by the common name Kafue pike. The type specimen was collected from Tshela, Democratic Republic of the Congo, and is housed at the Royal Museum for Central Africa in Belgium.

The genus name Hepsetus likely comes from the ancient Greek hepsētós, a word used to describe any small fish that was prepared for consumption by boiling. The specific name lineatus is the Latin word for "lined", which likely refers to the dark line visible between each row of the fish's scales.

== Distribution and habitat ==
H. lineatus is found in rivers in the Lower Guinea region of Africa, including the Dja River, Sanaga River, Nyong River, and Ntem River in Cameroon, the Ogowe River and Nyanga River in Gabon, the Kouilou-Niari River and Shiloango River in the Republic of the Congo, and the Chiloango River, Congo River, and Sangha River basins in the Democratic Republic of the Congo. As a demersal fish, it lives near the bottom of the water column.

== Description ==
H. lineatus is an elongated fish that reaches up to 28.3 cm (11.1 in) in standard length. It is distinguishable from its congeners primarily by counting lateral line scales and gill rakers and by measuring the anatomy of the head. While H. lineatus has 12–18 and rarely up to 20 gill rakers, H. kingsleyae and H. akawo have 17–23, and H. cuvieri has 8–13. Whereas H. lineatus has 50–64 lateral line scales, H. kingsleyae has 45–51 and H. akawo has 43–51. H. lineatus can also be distinguished from H. kingsleyae by the width of the head, which is 32.8–46.7% of the length of the head in H. lineatus and 26.4–35.6% of the head length in H. kingsleyae, and by the internasal distance (21.5–29.3% versus 15.6–23.3% of the head length, respectively). It is distinguishable from H. odoe by the internasal distance (21.5–29.3% versus 19.5–25.3% of the head length, respectively) and the distance between the nostril and the lower jaw (36.8–44.4% versus 40.4–47.6% of the head length, respectively). It can be additionally distinguished from H. cuvieri by the head width (32.8–46.7% versus 27.8–40.4% of the head length, respectively) and the internasal distance (21.5–29.3% versus 27.8–40.4% of the head length, respectively). Also, while H. lineatus has 7.5–9.5 scales between the dorsal fin and lateral line, H. cuvieri has 10.5–11.5, and whereas H. lineatus has 4–5.5 scales between the adipose fin and lateral line, H. cuvieri has 6.5–7.5.

== Conservation ==
H. lineatus is assessed as a least concern species on the IUCN Red List because it is widely distributed in its range and no major threats to its population have been identified.
