= Adonis tetra =

Conservation status
- Vulnerable (IUCN 3.1)

Scientific classification
- Kingdom: Animalia
- Phylum: Chordata
- Class: Actinopterygii
- Order: Characiformes
- Family: Lepidarchidae
- Genus: Lepidarchus; Roberts, 1966
- Species: L. adonis

Binomial name
- Lepidarchus adonis Roberts, 1966

Species of fish

The Adonis tetra (Lepidarchus adonis), also known as the jellybean tetra, is a species of very small African fish in the family Lepidarchidae. It can also be found in the aquarium trade.

== Taxonomy ==
The Adonis tetra is the only member of its genus, and shares its family with only one other species, the Niger tetra.

== Distribution ==
The Adonis tetra is native to freshwater habitats near the Atlantic coast in Ghana, Sierra Leone, and Côte d'Ivoire.

== Size ==
The Adonis tetra can reach 2.1 cm (0.83 in) in length, which means that it is smaller than the neon tetra and that it is one of the smallest fish found in the aquarium trade.

== Conservation status ==
The IUCN Red List has listed the Adonis tetra as being a vulnerable species since 2010. There is considerable cause for concern because of the increasing levels of pollution in the waterways it inhabits.
