= Grand Bassin (disambiguation) =

The Grand Bassin is a body of water along the Canal du Midi in Castelnaudary, France.

Grand Bassin may also refer to:

- Ganga Talao, or Grand Bassin, a lake in Savanne district, Mauritius
- Grand Bassin – Le Dimitile Important Bird Area, Réunion island
- Grand Bassin, the name of an octagonal fountain at the Jardin du Luxembourg
