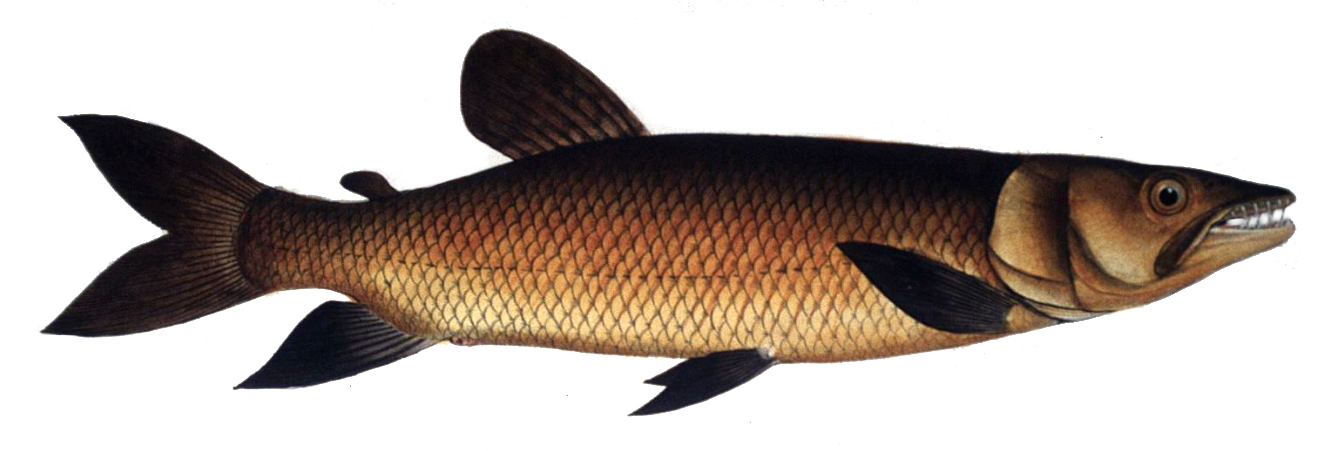

Conservation status
- Least Concern (IUCN 3.1)

Scientific classification
- Kingdom: Animalia
- Phylum: Chordata
- Class: Actinopterygii
- Division: Teleostei
- Order: Characiformes
- Family: Hepsetidae
- Genus: Hepsetus
- Species: H. odoe

Binomial name
- Hepsetus odoe (Bloch, 1794)

Synonyms
- Salmo odoe Bloch, 1794; Hydrocyonoides odoe (Bloch, 1794); Sarcodaces odoe (Bloch, 1794); Xiphorhamphus odoe (Bloch, 1794); Xiphorynchus odoe (Bloch, 1794); Salmo fulvus Shaw, 1804; Hepsetus fulvus (Shaw, 1804); Hepsetus akawo Decru, Vreven & Snoeks, 2012

= Hepsetus odoe =

Species of fish

Hepsetus odoe, the African pike characin, is a predatory freshwater characin belonging to the family Hepsetidae. It was formerly considered that there was a single species of Hepsetus pike characin but recent studies have led to the species being split and Hepsetus odoe sensu stricto is the west African representative of the group.

== Taxonomy ==
Hepsetus odoe was first formally described as Salmo odoe in 1794 by the German naturalist Marcus Elieser Bloch with its type locality given as the "coast of Guinea", likely Togo or southeastern Ghana. This species is the type species of the genus Hepsetus and was formerly believed to the only species in the genus and widespread in sub-Saharan Africa, but studies in 2011–2013 have found that there are several species, and the true H. odoe is restricted to West and Central Africa from the Sassandra River, Ivory Coast, to the Kienké River, Cameroon (species elsewhere are now recognized as separate; H. cuvieri, H. kingsleyae, H. lineata and H. occidentalis). The genus Hepsetus is the only genus classified within the family Hepsetidae, within the superfamily Alestoidea of the suborder Characoidei in the order Characiformes, the characins.

== Etymology ==
Hepsetus odoe has the genus name Hepsetus which was proposed by William Swainson in 1838, Swanson did not explain the etymology of this name but it is most likely derived from the ancient Greek hepsētós, a small fish, such as the anchovy, which is boiled for human consumption. This name, however, used for piscivorous fish resembling pikes, this may be an allusion to the Greek poet Archippus, who wrote: "An hepsetus fell in with an anchovy / And quick devoured him," and/or to the convergent South American characid Oligosarcus hepsetus. The specific name odoe is the local name for this species in Guinea, which appears to refer to its many teeth.

== Description ==
Hepsetus odoe is an elongated fish with a pike-like body, however this species is a characin and the pike resemblance is due to convergent evolution. This species can reach up to about 28 cm (11 in) in length. The back is normally dark brown or green while the belly is silver. The head is normally light green or brown with distinct dark brown or black stripes radiating out from the eye. The colour and pattern of adult fish is relatively stable but juveniles are more variable.

== Distribution ==
Hepsetus odoe is found in western sub-Saharan Africa, from the Sassandra River in the Côte d'Ivoire in the west to the Shari River in the Central African Republic in the east, and southwards up to the Kienke River in Cameroon.

== Biology ==
Hepsetus odoe prefers quiet and deep water, and may only live about five years. Spawning normally begins in August and continues until January. Although in some locations there is an extended spawning season which lasts until May. The eggs are laid in a bubble nest, which they then guard until the young have attached themselves to the bottom of the nest, at which stage the adults abandon the nest and their young. The nest breaks up about four days afterwards and the juveniles disperse to live in well-vegetated marginal habitats.

Hepsetus odoe is piscivorous and preys on a variety of smaller fish. It is mainly diurnal and is an ambush predator, waiting among dense submerged or emergent vegetation until prey comes within range and the fish can lunge at it. The diet of Hepsetus odoe consists predominantly of cichlids and mormyrids; although smaller individuals have been recorded eating mochokid catfishes more than cichlids or mormyrids. Hepsetus odoe prefers the upper courses of small rivers where the elongate tigerfish (Hydrocynus forskahlii) is absent or less abundant. It uses weeds and vegetation along with its coloring to avoid detection.

== Human use ==
Hepsetus odoe is fished as game and for human consumption and for the aquarium trade.
