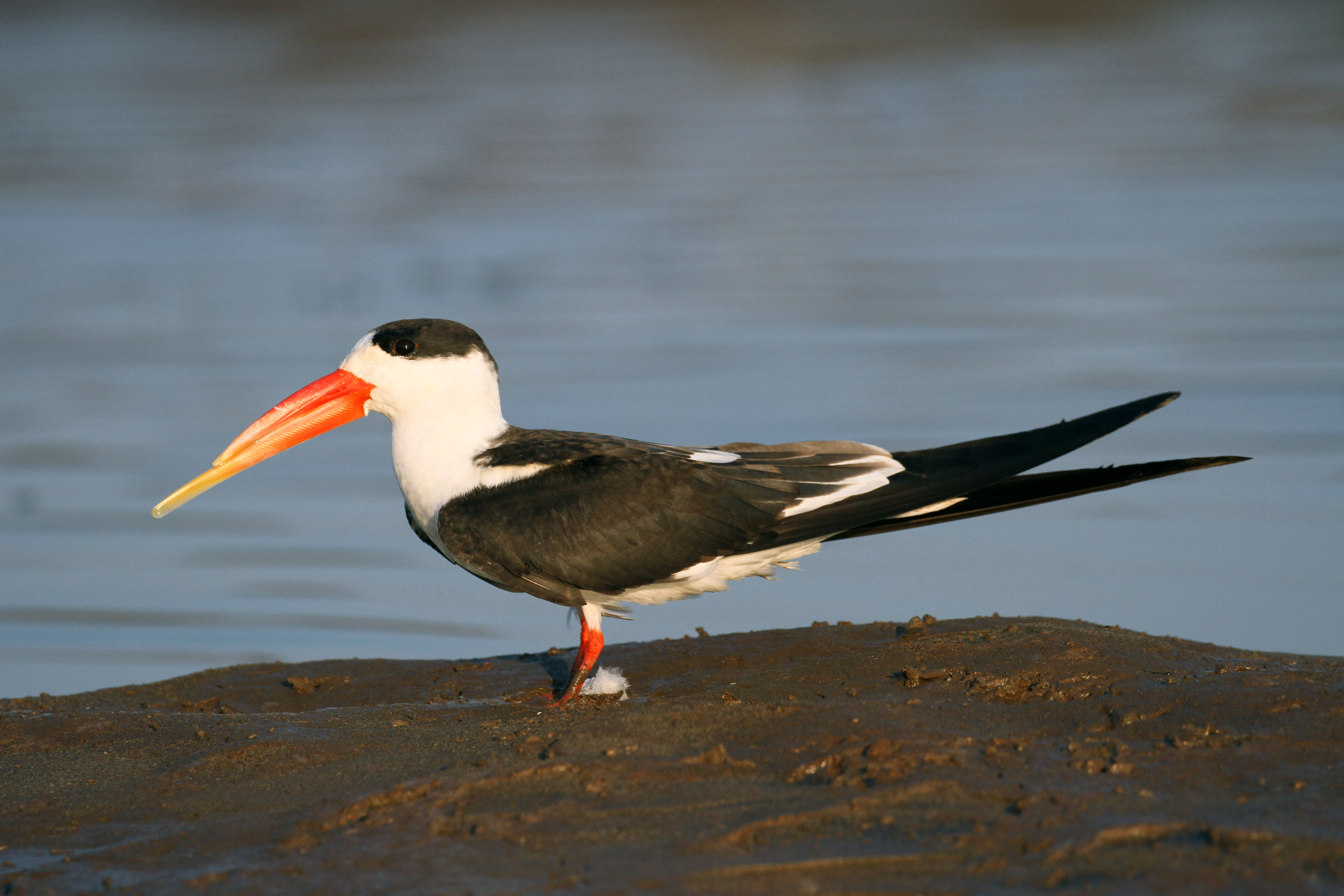

Conservation status
- Endangered (IUCN 3.1)

Scientific classification
- Kingdom: Animalia
- Phylum: Chordata
- Class: Aves
- Order: Charadriiformes
- Family: Laridae
- Genus: Rynchops
- Species: R. albicollis

Binomial name
- Rynchops albicollis Swainson, 1838

Synonyms
- Rhynchops albicollis

= Indian skimmer =

Species of bird

The Indian skimmer (Rynchops albicollis) or Indian scissors-bill, is one of the three species that belong to the skimmer genus Rynchops in the family Laridae. They are somewhat tern-like but like other skimmers, have a short upper mandible and the longer lower mandible that is ploughed along the surface of water as the bird flies over the water to pick aquatic prey. It is found in southern Asia, where it is patchily distributed and declining in numbers. They are mainly found in rivers or estuaries. They are very brightly marked in black, white and orange, making them difficult to miss.

== Description ==
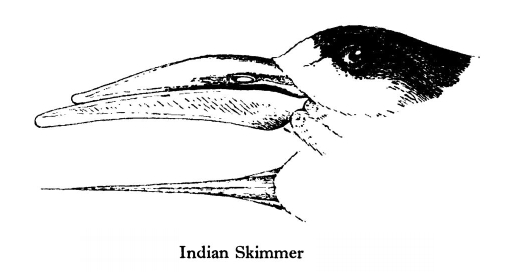
The bill is thin and knife-like to reduce resistance to water

This bird has a black cap and orange bill that contrasts with the white body. With its long wings it looks tern-like and is about 40–43 cm long with a wingspan of 108 cm. The upper parts of the body are dark black and the underparts are white. The black cap on the head leaves the forehead and nape white. The wings are long and pointed with a white trailing edge. The short, forked tail is white with blackish central feathers. The long, thick bill is orange with a yellow tip and, like the other skimmers, has a lower mandible which is longer than the upper mandible. The legs and feet are red. The lower bill is knife-like and flexible and the tip appears truncated. Young birds have bills that appear normal and with age the lower mandible grows. The upper mandible is capable of considerable mobility.

Non-breeding adults are duller and browner than breeding birds. Juveniles are grey-brown above with pale fringes to the feathers on the back and wings. The head has more white than in adult birds and the bill is orange-brown with a dark tip.

It has a high, nasal, screaming kyap-kyap call but is usually very silent.

The black skimmer of the Americas is larger with a black tip to the bill. The African skimmer is smaller with more black in the tail and no white collar. In older times the Indian skimmer was also known as the Indian scissors-bill.

== Distribution and habitat ==
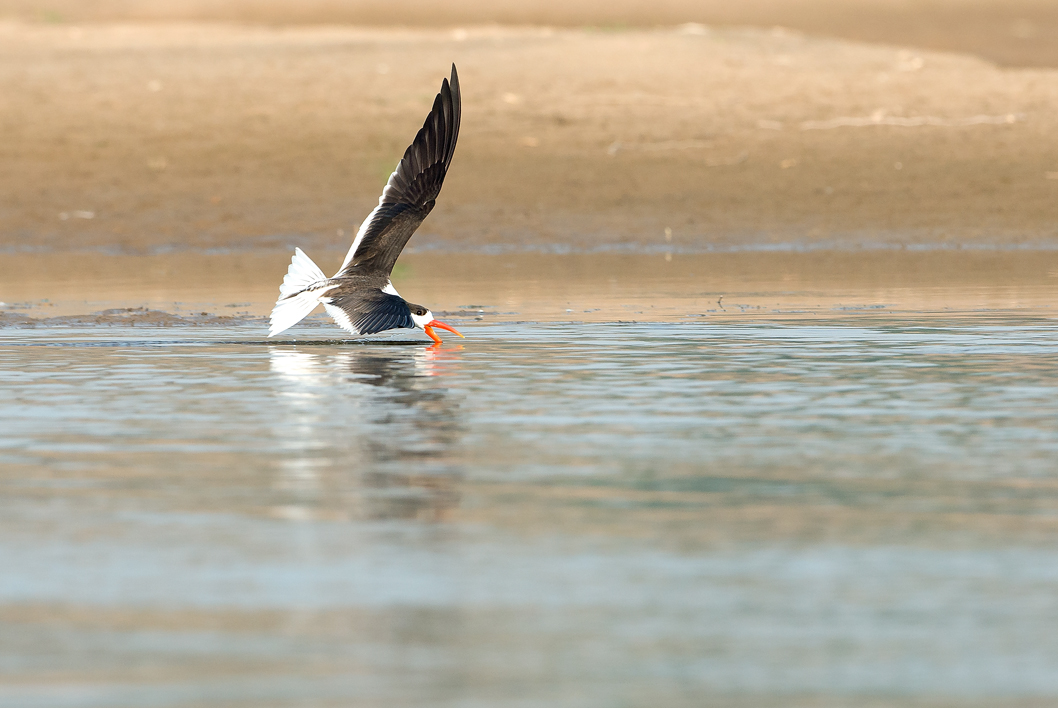
An Indian skimmer seen skimming for food in the River Chambal near Dholpur, Rajasthan.

It is found on large rivers and lakes, swamps and coastal wetlands such as estuaries. It is most common on freshwater, particularly during the breeding season. Breeding colonies are on islands or sandy spits, usually in rivers. Its range has become increasingly fragmented in recent decades. It is still found in parts of Pakistan in the Indus river system of Kashmir and northern and central India along the Ganges, Bangladesh and Burma and formerly occurred in Laos, Cambodia and Vietnam. It is a scarce non-breeding visitor to Nepal and has occurred as a vagrant in Oman and central Thailand with old records from Iran and China. At present, the last strongholds of the Indian Skimmer are India, and Bangladesh. They are more widespread in winter and are found in coastal estuaries of western and eastern India as far south as Karwar on the western coast and; Chennai and Pondicherry on the eastern coast exist.

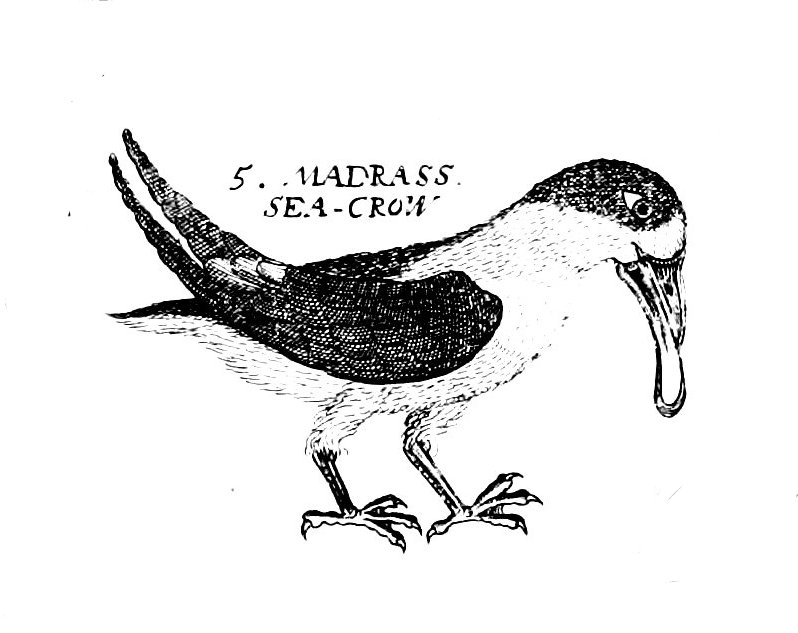
A 1713 illustration in John Rays Synopsis methodica avium & piscium with a description of the "Madrass Sea Crow" by Edward Buckley

Breeding colonies are known from the Chambal river area, an area that is of importance for the gharial. Sand banks are important for the nesting of Gharials. They have also been documented as breeding on the banks of the Mahanadi river at the Munduli barrage, Chandaka Wildlife Division in Cuttack.

== Behaviour ==
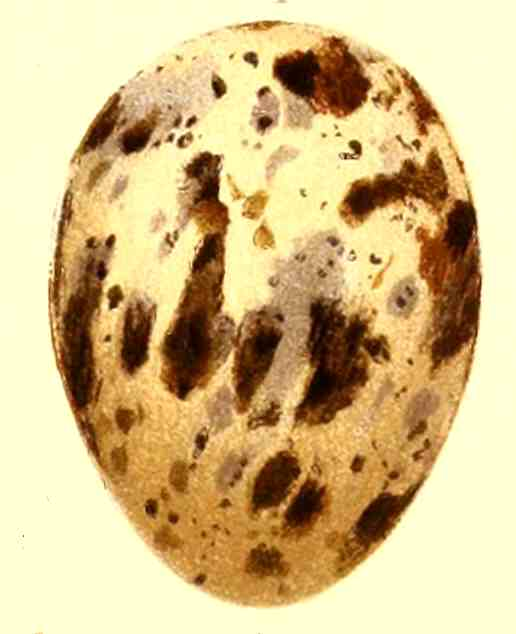
Egg colouration

The birds forage for food by flying low over the water with the bill open and the lower mandible skimming through the water. When a fish is encountered, it moves up the lower mandible and the bird raises the upper mandible and snaps it with a movement of the head. They forage in small flocks and often associate with terns. They feed mainly on fish but also take small crustaceans and insect larvae. They often feed at dusk and can be very nocturnal.

The breeding season is mainly March and May. They breed in colonies of up to 40 pairs, often with terns and other birds. The nest is a simple scrape on the ground mainly on open sand banks that provide unobstructed views of any oncoming predators. The eggs are buff or white with brown blotches and streaks. There are three to five eggs in a clutch. They may indulge in a low-level of inter-specific brood parasitism, laying their eggs in the nests of river terns (Sterna aurantia). The birds tend to incubate the eggs more during the cooler hours of the day and are often away from the nest during the hotter parts of the day. Incubating adults are said to indulge in belly-soaking behaviour to cool the eggs. A bird at nest was once observed to pick up (and drop into water) an intruding chick of a river tern using its leg.

== Conservation ==
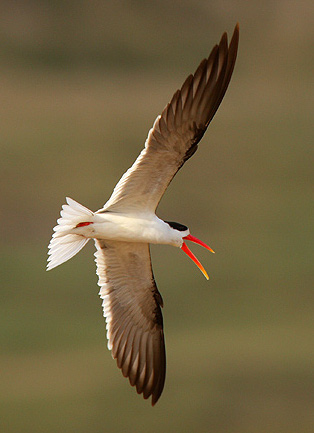

The species was formerly widely distributed in the rivers of the Indian subcontinent and along the river systems of Myanmar and Mekong. Records from Laos, Cambodia and Vietnam are mainly from the 19th century and recent records are rare.

The population is now mainly within India and Pakistan and is estimated to be about 6,000-10,000 individuals. The decreasing population has led it to being classed as Endangered by the IUCN. It is threatened by habitat loss and degradation, pollution and disturbance by humans. Most colonies are unprotected but some lie within nature reserves such as National Chambal Sanctuary in India.
