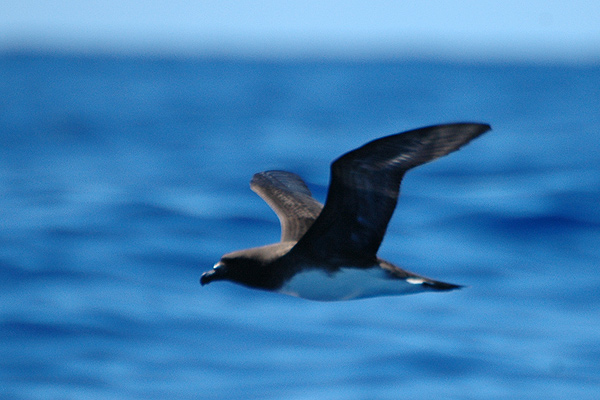

Conservation status
- Near Threatened (IUCN 3.1)

Scientific classification
- Kingdom: Animalia
- Phylum: Chordata
- Class: Aves
- Order: Procellariiformes
- Family: Procellariidae
- Genus: Pseudobulweria
- Species: P. rostrata

Binomial name
- Pseudobulweria rostrata (Peale, 1849)

= Tahiti petrel =

Species of bird

The Tahiti petrel (Pseudobulweria rostrata) is a medium-sized, dark brown and white seabird found across the Pacific Ocean. The species comprises two subspecies: P. r. rostrata which breeds in the west-central Pacific Ocean, and P. r. trouessarti which breeds in the tropical and subtropical Pacific Ocean. The Tahiti petrel belongs to the Procellariidae family and is the most studied member of the Pseudobulweria genus which comprises three critically endangered species. Similarly, the Tahiti petrel is considered near threatened by the 2018 IUCN Red List of Threatened Species. Threats include introduced rats, feral cats, pigs, dogs, nickel mining, and light pollution.

== Taxonomy ==
In 1848, Peale collected and described the first specimen of this species in Tahiti. Then, in 1917, the Tahiti petrel was separated into two subspecies: rostrata and trouessarti, due to trouessarti's more robust bill. Not only is there a physiological difference between the two, they are also found in different geographic locations. P. r. rostrata, the nominate subspecies, breeds in the west-central Pacific Ocean whereas P. r. trouessarti breeds in the tropical and subtropical Pacific Ocean. Also, after originally being classified as Pterodroma, genetic studies showed that the bird is instead a part of the Pseudobulweria genus. Furthermore, this study showed species distinction between the Mascarene petrel (Pseudobulweria aterrima) and the Tahiti petrel (Pseudobulweria aterrima) by analyzing phylogenetic histories. Indeed, the genus includes the Tahiti petrel, Beck's petrel (Pseudobulweria becki), the Fiji petrel (Pseudobulweria macgillivrayi), the Mascarene petrel (Pseudobulweria aterrima), and the Saint Helena petrel (Pterodroma rupinarum) which is now extinct. Similarly to the Mascarene petrel before gene analysis, Beck's petrel is currently considered a member of the Tahiti petrel species by some scientists due to the lack of specimens for research.

== Description ==
Adult Tahiti petrels are between 315 and 506 g and have wingspans averaging 104.5 cm long whereas their overall length is between 38-42 cm. The species is identifiable by its wedge-shaped tail, long wings and neck, small head, black, stout, and bulbous bill, dark brown eyes, and dark elongated body with white abdomen. In addition, adults are mostly dark brown with darker hoods and paler rumps. Their underwings have a faint white line along the middle with slightly paler flight feathers. Juveniles are similar to adults in plumage and females usually have smaller measurements.

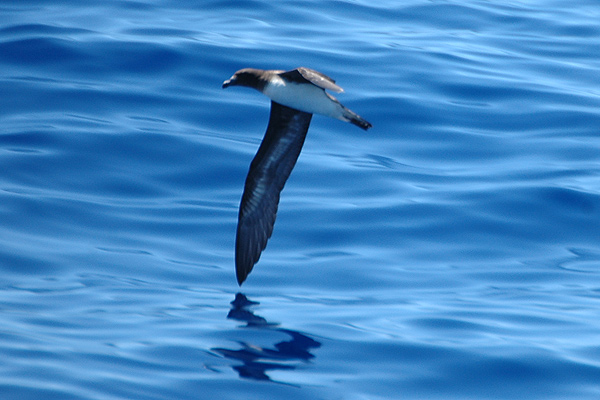
Tahiti petrel photographed off the Gold Coast of south east Queensland, Australia

At long ranges, the species might be hard to identify from other petrels that overlap their geographic distribution. The biggest difference is usually in the narrower wings of the Tahiti petrel which are fully perpendicular to the body and straight in flight, more closely resembling an albatross. On the other hand, the Phoenix petrel (Pterodroma alba), a similar but smaller petrel, flies with wings more forward and bent. From closer ranges, the Tahiti petrel is distinct from the Phoenix petrel due to the latter's larger bill, lack of white line on underwings, and paler tail. In addition, the Atlantic petrel (Pterodroma incerta) is sometimes confused for the Tahiti petrel due to its similar white abdomen. However, the Atlantic petrel can be identified by its brown undertail, dark patch around the eye, and plain underwings.

== Distribution and habitat ==
Despite its name, the Tahiti petrel is found across the Pacific Ocean. As discussed earlier, the subspecies breed in different areas of the ocean:

P. r. rostrata - Confirmed to breed in the American Samoa, Gambier Islands, Marquesas Islands, and Society Islands. Potentially breeds on Rarotonga of the Cook Islands as well.

P. r. trouessarti – Confirmed to breed in New Caledonia and Vanuatu.

Their non-breeding geographic distribution is Australia, Guam, and the Federated States of Micronesia. However, vagrant individuals have been identified all over South and Central America, Asia, and Oceania as seen below.

Vagrants have been found in Chile, Colombia, Costa Rica, Ecuador, El Salvador, French Southern Territories, Guatemala, Indonesia, Japan, Kiribati, Marshall Islands, Nauru, Nicaragua, Niue, Norfolk Island, Northern Mariana Islands, Palau, Panama, Papua New Guinea, Peru, Philippines, Pitcairn, Samoa, Tokelau, Tonga, Tuvalu, United States Minor Outlying Islands, and Wallis and Futuna.

The Tahiti petrel requires both terrestrial and marine systems and is often found in both shallow and oceanic marine habitats as well as shrubland and forest habitat types. In terms of marine habitats, they prefer water with surface temperatures higher than 25°C. Consequently, El Niño events may have an influence on their abundance in waters of the East Pacific.

== Behaviour ==
=== Reproduction ===
When nesting, the species lays eggs at high altitudes in mountains or forests. This explains its preference for volcanic islands when breeding. Although the Tahiti petrel breeds all year long, a peak of egg-laying occurs between March and July with most newborns being ready to fly between July and September. In general, the loose breeding season is associated with the March to October period. In New Caledonia, P. r. trouessarti nests in crevices and burrows up to 500 m high in elevation. In other areas, the species may nest up to 1,900 m high. Overall, the breeding biology of the Pseudobulweria genus is scarce, with no data on incubation or chick-rearing gathered.

=== Diet ===
The Tahiti petrel's diet is close to unknown, although some observational feeding records exist. These records describe the bird seizing prey at the surface of water instead of diving. For example, they have been found to hunt sea skaters and have feeding associations with other seabirds and pilot whales. Analysis of their gut contents has revealed the digestion of deep pelagic fish, cephalopods, and benthopelagic fish like hatchetfish (Sternoptychidae family), snake mackerels (Gempylus serpens), and silver scabbardfish (Lepidopus caudatus). Since these petrels do not dive, the presence of deep-sea fish in their stomachs indicates scavenging behaviour on dead organisms or seizing species at night when they migrate vertically in the water column.

=== Vocalization ===
When in flight or on its breeding ground, P. r. rostrata uses a long series of whistles in an elaborate call ending with a hooting sound. Specifically in American Samoa, P. r. rostrata vocalization was described as a ground call composed of 7 parts, uttering a condensed version when in flight. The introductory "ti-ti" call is a series of staccato notes observed in 20 other petrel species. Furthermore, as the subspecies gets closer to the colony in the dark or fog, researchers believe it may use echolocating methodologies. On the other hand, while flying, P. r. trouessarti performs up-slurred whistles and when on the ground, usually performs braying whistles composed of a hiccup, whistle, moan, pause, and harmonics. In general, many variations in call segments are observed, which may display sex, emotions, and individuality.

== Conservation ==
=== Population trends ===
Pseudobulweria is the most endangered seabird genus as the Fiji petrel, Beck's petrel, and the Mascarene petrel are all critically endangered. Indeed, the Tahiti petrel is considered near threatened by the 2018 IUCN Red List of Threatened Species. Most population trends are unknown in Fiji, American Samoa, and the Cook Islands. However, breeding populations are decreasing on Marquesas, Tahiti, and Mo'orea with <500 pairs, <1,000 pairs, and <several thousand pairs respectively in each. Overall, the species is estimated to have 10,000–19,999 mature individuals with 20,000–30,000 total individuals. According to marine surveys, a 35% decrease in eastern tropical Pacific individuals was approximated between the periods of 1988–1990 and 1998–2000.

=== Threats ===
Threats to P. r. rostrata populations include feral cats (Felis catus) and introduced rats (Rattus spp.). Although predator control is required, the development of roads in mountainous regions has increased predatory access to the Tahiti petrel's breeding sites. This includes access from the Swamp Harrier (Circus approximans), a natural predator. Similarly, the P. r. trouessarti subspecies is threatened by feral pigs (Sus scrofa), dogs (Canis familiaris), cats, and nickel mining. More specifically, dogs and pigs have been found to dig out the petrels from their nests whereas mining allows for the ingestion of harmful materials, decreasing breeding success. In addition, in New Caledonia and French Polynesia, coastal light pollution can lead to mortality in juveniles. Furthermore, the relationship between Tahiti petrels and Wedge-tailed Shearwaters (Ardenna pacifica) is a topic of interest for researchers as intense competition for burrows has been recorded.

=== Conservation actions ===
Currently, the KNS Mining Society plans on reducing mining in the Koniambo massif mountain range of New Caledonia. There, the Société Calédonienne d'Ornithologie (SCO) is campaigning to collect and release individuals disoriented by light pollution. Since population trends are still mainly unknown, census and monitoring will continue for further understanding of the species' conservation needs.
