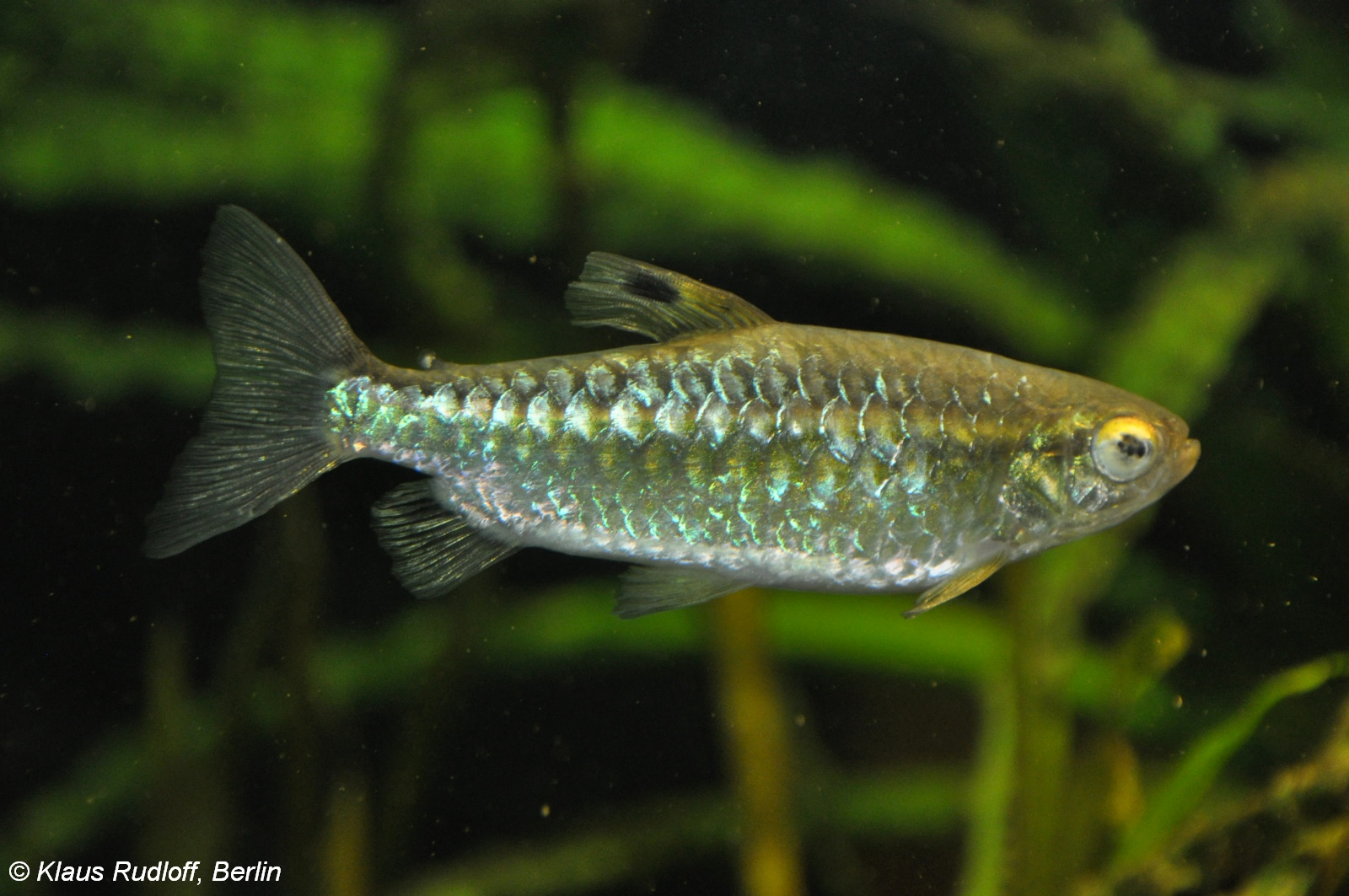
- Niger tetra (Arnoldichthys spilopterus)

Scientific classification
- Kingdom: Animalia
- Phylum: Chordata
- Class: Actinopterygii
- Order: Characiformes
- Suborder: Characoidei
- Family: Lepidarchidae; Melo & Stiassny, 2024

Genera
- see text

= Lepidarchidae =

Family of fishes

Lepidarchidae is a small family of freshwater Actinopterygii belonging to the order Characiformes. It contains only two threatened, monotypic genera native to western Africa.

== Genera ==
Lepidarchidae has the following genera classified within it:

- Arnoldichthys Myers, 1926
- Lepidarchus Roberts, 1966

Both of these genera were previously placed in Alestidae, but moved to their own family in 2024 when this placement was found to be paraphyletic, as these two genera are more closely related to the Hepsetidae than to alestids. Molecular phylogenetic estimates suggest that this family has an ancient divergence dating to the Late Cretaceous (Santonian to Campanian, about 84–77.5 mya). The divergence of these two families appears to have been driven by the Trans-Saharan Seaway, which served as a marine barrier between western and eastern Africa at the time.
