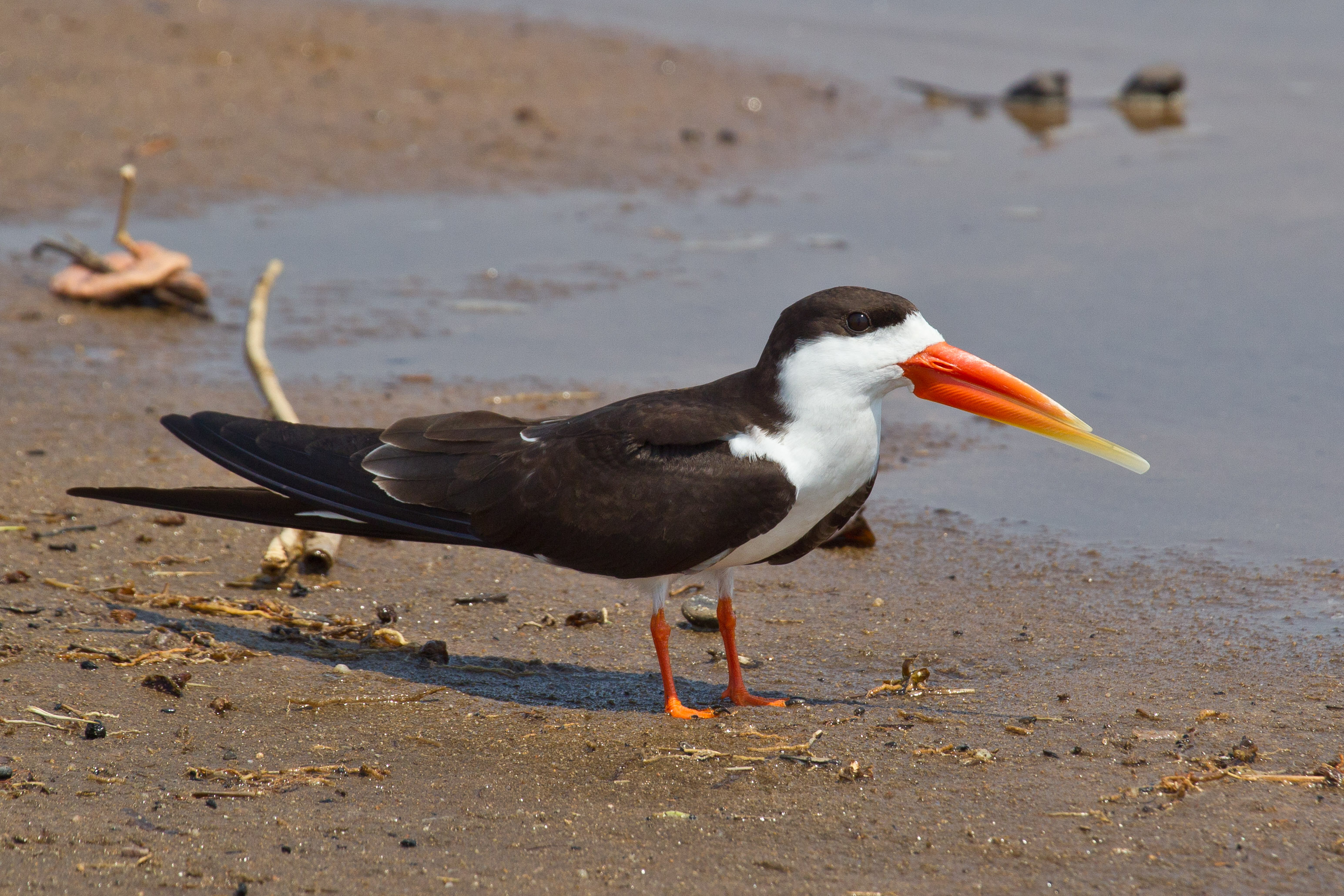

Conservation status
- Least Concern (IUCN 3.1)

Scientific classification
- Kingdom: Animalia
- Phylum: Chordata
- Class: Aves
- Order: Charadriiformes
- Family: Laridae
- Genus: Rynchops
- Species: R. flavirostris

Binomial name
- Rynchops flavirostris Vieillot, 1816

= African skimmer =

Species of bird

The African skimmer (Rynchops flavirostris) is a species of bird belonging to the skimmer genus Rynchops in the family Laridae. It is found along rivers, lakes and lagoons in Sub-Saharan Africa.

== Description ==
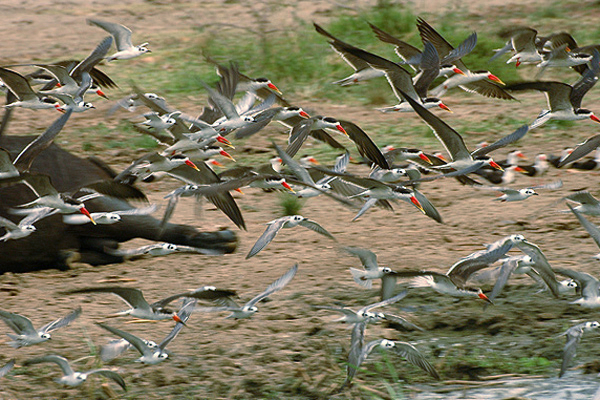
African skimmers and white-winged terns at Kazinga Channel, Uganda

African skimmers have long wings, with a black back, hindneck, and crown. The forehead and rest of the body is white, with a bright, long, orange beak that ends with a yellow tip (black tip when immature), hence the specific name flavirostris, "yellow-beak". Their short forked tail is white, and their legs are bright red. The average size is about 38 cm (15 in) long. Their voice is a sharp "kip-kip". Their bill structure is unique; the lower mandible is much longer than the upper mandible, and is flattened sideways like scissor blades.

== Distribution and habitat ==
The African skimmer is found from Senegal to northern Congo River and southern Nile Valley, southern Tanzania to the Zambezi Valley, and then to KwaZulu-Natal Province (South Africa) and Angola. They live at large tropical rivers with sandbanks for nesting and roosting, lake shores, and coastal lagoons. The African skimmer is generally uncommon and the total populations is estimated at 15,000–25,000 individuals.

== Behavior ==
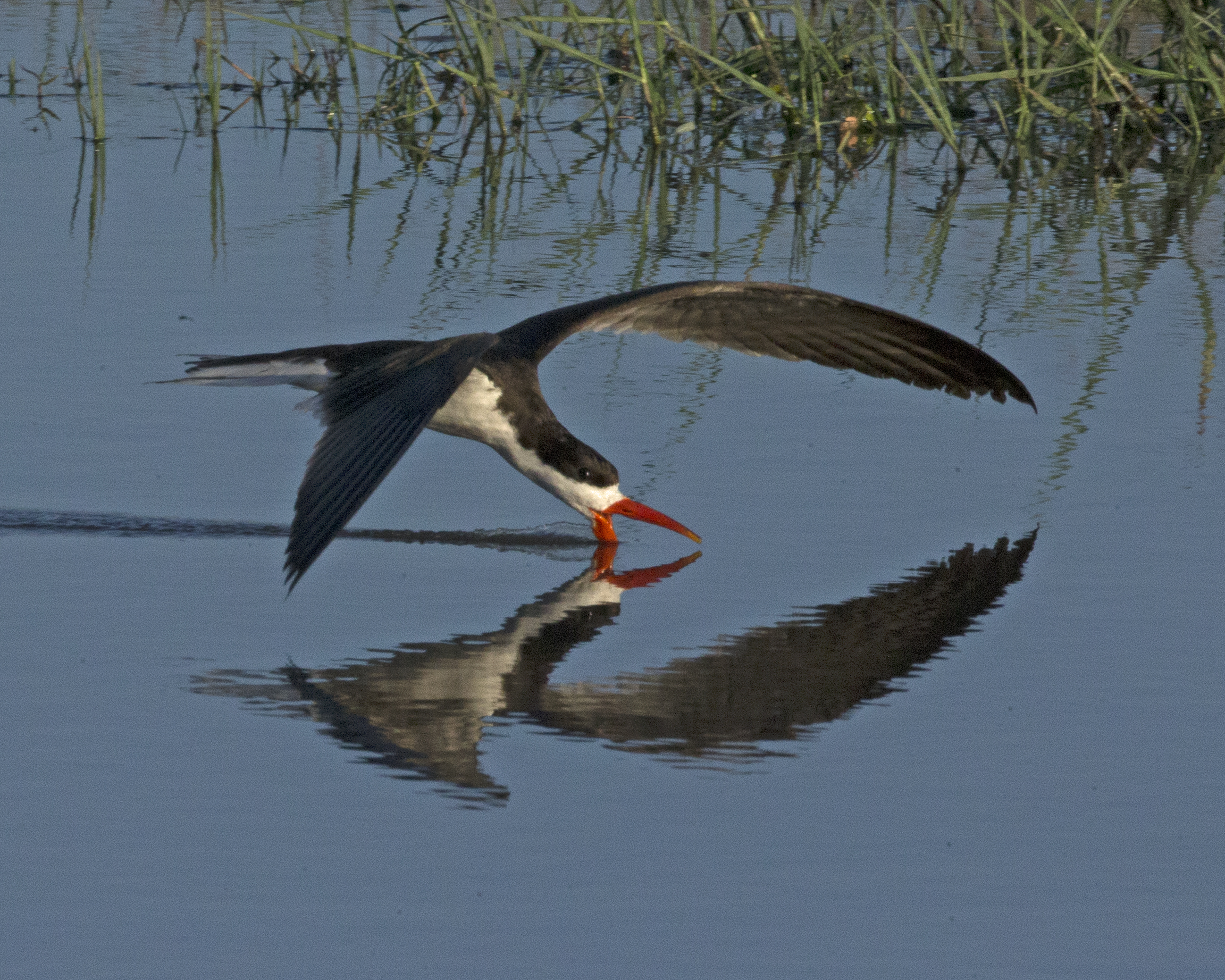
African skimmer feeding in Chobe, Botswana

African skimmers fly in lines over calm waters, and dip their lower mandibles in the water to feed. When the mandible touches a fish, the skimmer snaps its mouth shut. They feed mostly at dawn and dusk and have good night vision. The following fish have been recorded as prey for African skimmers: Micralestes, Tilapia, Barbus, Marcusenius , Hepsetus, Aplocheilichthys and Petrocephalus.

=== Reproduction ===
African skimmers nest in loose colonies on large sandbanks. The colonies typically consist of less than 50 pairs and each pair lays 2–3 (rarely 4) eggs in a scrape in the sand. Sometimes African skimmer colonies are mixed with those of other sand bank nesting birds such as collared pratincole, pied avocet and white-fronted plover.

=== Movements ===
African skimmers are partial intra-African migrants, they arrive in southern Africa when the water level of rivers starts falling at the beginning of the dry season, i.e. April–June, returning northwards after breeding when rivers start rising again at the start of the rainy season in November–January.
