= James Bulwer =

British naturalist (1794–1879)

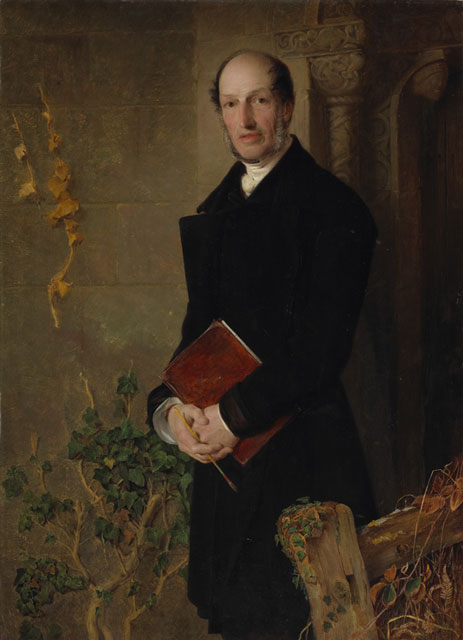
- Born: 21 March 1794; Aylsham, Norfolk, England
- Died: 1 June 1879 (aged 85)
- Education: John Sell Cotman
- Known for: Landscape painting
- Movement: Norwich School of painters

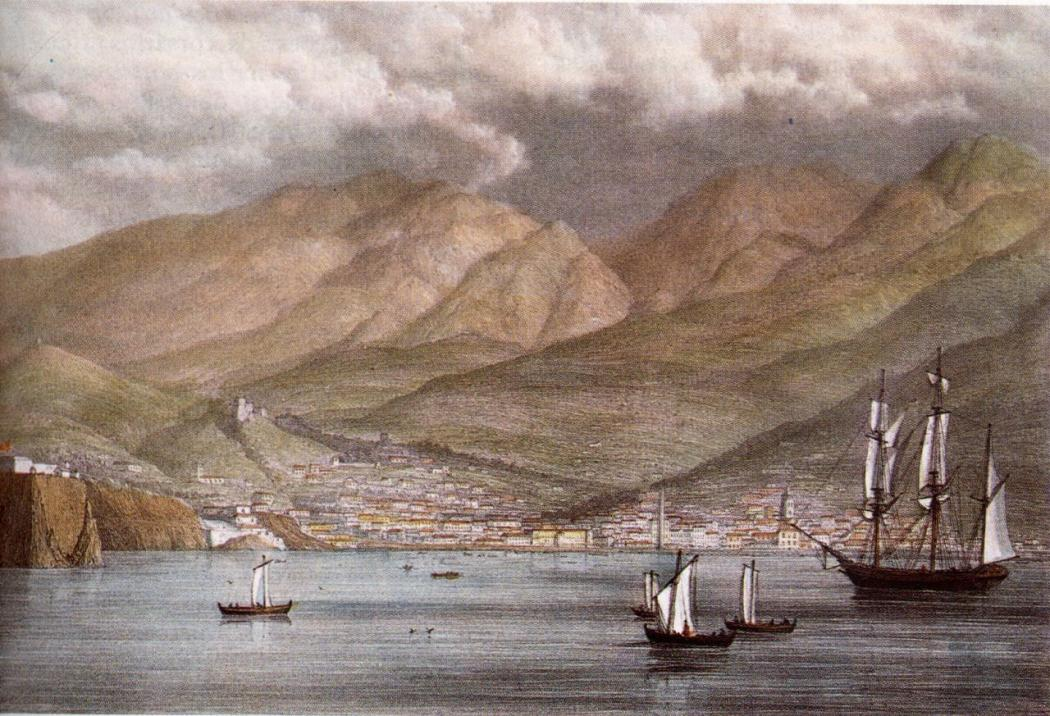
Funchal from the Anchorage,(1825)

The Reverend James Bulwer (21 March 1794 – 11 June 1879) was an English collector, naturalist, artist and conchologist. He was a close friend and patron of the artist John Sell Cotman. He is considered to be a member of the Norwich School of painters.

== Life ==
James Bulwer was born at Aylsham in the English county of Norfolk, the son of James Bulwer and Mary Seaman, and was baptised by his parents on 23 March 1794, at St Michael and All Angels, the town's parish church. He studied at Jesus College, Cambridge. During his time at Cambridge he took drawing lessons from the landscape artist John Sell Cotman and became a fellow of the Linnean Society due to his interest in molluscs, one of his three proposers being William Elford Leach.

In 1818 he was made a deacon and in 1822 he became a priest. In 1823 he became curate of Booterstown in Dublin, moving to Bristol in 1831 and St James's, Piccadilly in 1833. He spent several winters travelling in Spain, Portugal and the Madeira Islands, sometimes in the company of the philosopher and traveller Alfred Lyall. In the spring of 1825 Bulwer collected a specimen of an unknown petrel in the Madeira Islands. This was described by William Jardine and P. J. Selby in 1828 and given the common name of Bulwer's petrel. The petrel genus of Bulweria was also named for him.

Bulwer left London in 1839 and moved back to Norfolk, becoming curate of Blickling Hall and later of Hunworth. He renewed his acquaintance with Cotman when his sons attended King's College School, and several of his sketches of Spain and Madeira inspired Cotman's watercolours.

His son James Redfoord Bulwer became a lawyer and a Member of parliament and also played first-class cricket.

== Bibliography ==
- Moore, Andrew W. (1985). The Norwich School of Artists. HMSO/Norwich Museums Service.
- Walpole, Josephine (1997). Art and Artists of the Norwich School. Woodbridge: Antique Collectors' Club. ISBN 1-85149-261-5.
