= Olson's petrel =

Conservation status
- Extinct (IUCN 3.1)

Scientific classification
- Kingdom: Animalia
- Phylum: Chordata
- Class: Aves
- Order: Procellariiformes
- Family: Procellariidae
- Genus: Bulweria
- Species: †B. bifax

Binomial name
- †Bulweria bifax Olson, 1975
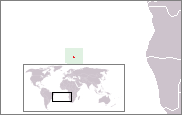
- Location of Saint Helena

Extinct species of bird

Olson's petrel (Bulweria bifax), also known as the small Saint Helena petrel or the Saint Helena Bulwer's petrel, is an extinct species of seabird in the family Procellariidae. It was endemic to Saint Helena.
