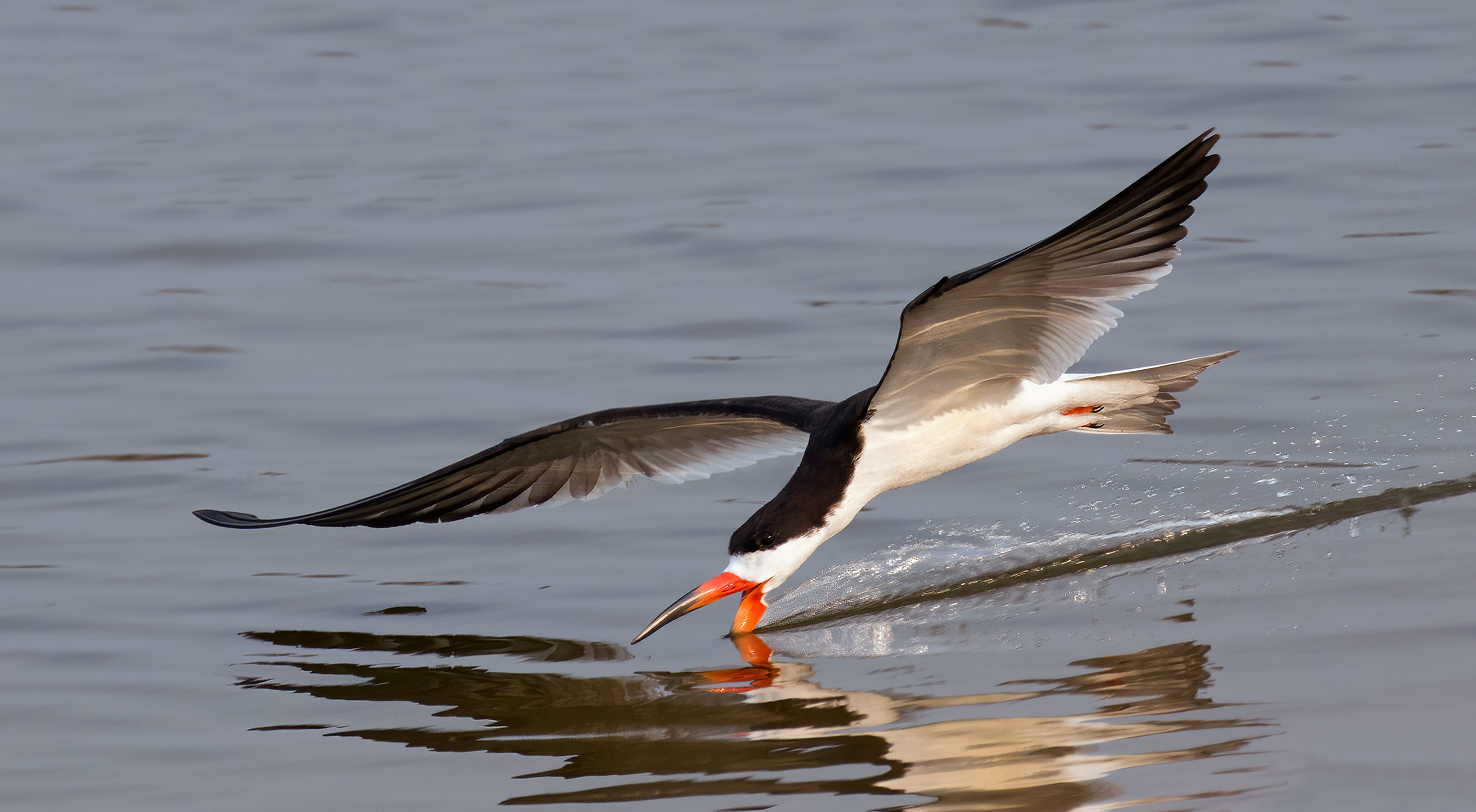
- Black skimmer (R. niger) skimming

Scientific classification
- Kingdom: Animalia
- Phylum: Chordata
- Class: Aves
- Order: Charadriiformes
- Family: Laridae
- Genus: Rynchops; Linnaeus, 1758

Type species
- Rynchops niger (black skimmer) Linnaeus, 1758

Species
- Black skimmer (R. niger); African skimmer (R. flavirostris); Indian skimmer (R. albicollis)

= Rynchops =

Skimmers

Genus of birds

The skimmers, forming the genus Rynchops (from Ancient Greek ῥύγχος (rhúnkhos), meaning "beak", and ὄψ (óps), meaning "face"), are tern-like birds in the family Laridae. The genus comprises three species found in South Asia, Africa, and the Americas. They were formerly known as the scissorbills.

== Description ==
The three species are the only birds with distinctive uneven bills, where the lower mandible is conspicuously longer than the upper. This remarkable adaptation allows them to fish in a unique way, flying low and fast over lakes, streams, and lagoons. Their lower mandible skims or slices over the water's surface, ready to snap shut any small fish unable to dart clear. The skimmers are now included within the gull and tern family Laridae, where they are positioned as a sister group of the terns and noddies. Skimmers also have an additional adaptation in being the only genus of birds known to have vertical slit-shaped pupils. The forehead, ends of the secondaries, tail feathers and under parts are white, the rest of the plumage is black and the basal half of the bill is crimson. Their bills fall within their field of binocular vision, which enables them to carefully position their bill and capture prey. They are agile in flight and gather in large flocks along rivers and coastal sand banks.

They are tropical and subtropical species which lay 3–6 eggs on sandy beaches. The female incubates the eggs. Because of the species' restricted nesting habitat, the three species are vulnerable to disturbance at their nesting sites. One species, the Indian skimmer, is considered endangered by the IUCN due to this as well as destruction and degradation of the lakes and rivers it uses for feeding.

== Taxonomy ==
The genus Rynchops was introduced in 1758 by the Swedish naturalist Carl Linnaeus in the tenth edition of his Systema Naturae. (Note: Linnaeus also used the spelling Rhyncops.) The genus name Rynchops is from Ancient Greek ῥύγχος (rhúnkhos), meaning "beak", and ὄψ (óps), meaning "face". The type species is the black skimmer (Rynchops niger).

As in later editions of the works of Carl Linnaeus, the correct spelling should be Rhynchops and this is often adopted. However, the misspelling Rynchops was the one first published by Linnaeus and continues to be more commonly used. Similarly, the gender of the Greek and Roman words is feminine and the genus was originally treated as such (R. nigra) but Rynchops is now usually treated as a masculine noun (R. niger).

=== Species ===
The genus contains three species.

Genus Rynchops – Linnaeus, 1758 – three species
Common name	Scientific name and subspecies	Range	Size and ecology	IUCN status and estimated population
Black skimmer	Rynchops niger Linnaeus, 1758 Three subspecies: R. n. niger (Linnaeus, 1758); R. n. cinerascens (von Spix, 1825); R. n. intercedens (Saunders, 1895)	Atlantic coast of North America, and from southern California to Peru in the Pacific, the Amazon basin, Atlantic coast of South America south to central Argentina	Size: about 40–50 cm (16–20 in) long, with a 107–127 cm (42–50 in) wingspan. Habitat: sandbanks and sandy beaches in the Americas. Diet: fish prey species include Odontesthes argentinenesis, Brevoortia aurea, Anchoa marinii, Lycengraulis grossidens, Engraulis anchoita, Pomatomus saltatrix, Mugil cephalus, Fundulus heteroclitus, Anchoa mitchilli, and Odontesthes incisa.	LC
African skimmer	Rynchops flavirostris Vieillot, 1816	Senegal to northern Congo River and southern Nile Valley, southern Tanzania to the Zambezi Valley, and then to KwaZulu-Natal Province (South Africa) and Angola	Size: about 38 cm (15 in) long, with a wingspan of 106 cm (41.7 in). Habitat: large tropical rivers with sandbanks for nesting and roosting, lake shores, and coastal lagoons. Diet: mainly of fish, including Tilapia, Barbus, Micralestes, Hepsetus, Aplocheilichthys, and Petrocephalus.	LC
Indian skimmer	Rynchops albicollis Swainson, 1838	Pakistan in the Indus river system of Kashmir and northern and central India along the Ganges, Bangladesh and Burma and formerly occurred in Laos, Cambodia and Vietnam	Size: about 40–43 cm (15.7-16.9 in) long, with a wingspan of 108 cm (42.5 in). Habitat: large rivers and lakes, swamps and coastal wetlands such as estuaries. Diet: mainly fish but also small crustaceans and insect larvae.	EN
