= Beck's petrel =

Conservation status
- Critically Endangered (IUCN 3.1)

Scientific classification
- Kingdom: Animalia
- Phylum: Chordata
- Class: Aves
- Order: Procellariiformes
- Family: Procellariidae
- Genus: Pseudobulweria
- Species: P. becki

Binomial name
- Pseudobulweria becki (Murphy, 1928)

Synonyms
- Pterodroma becki Pterodroma rostrata becki

Species of bird

Beck's petrel (Pseudobulweria becki) is a small species of petrel. Its specific epithet commemorates American ornithologist Rollo Beck. It is believed to nest on small islands with tall mountains around Melanesia. Described in 1928, and long known from only two specimens, sightings and collections in the 2000s confirmed the birds still existed, but are considered critically endangered by the IUCN.

== Description ==
It is dark brown above and on the head and throat. It is dark underneath the wings with a fairly distinct white wingbar. The belly and breast are white. It flies over open oceans with straight wings that are slightly bent back at the tips.

== History ==
The petrel used to be known from only two specimens – a female east of New Ireland, PNG in 1928 and a male north-east of Rendova, Solomon Islands in 1929. In 2005, a bird possibly of this species was photographed in Australia's Coral Sea by birding tour guide Richard Baxter. He noted that it was definitely not the similar and much more common Tahiti petrel because it is much smaller. He also noted the pale throat and shorter and broader wings. This record has not been officially accepted by the Birds Australia Rarities Committee, considering at the time of the report, no living specimens of the species had been found, but given the new evidence this may eventually change.

In recent times, sightings of birds that may have been Beck's petrels were reported from the Bismarck Archipelago and Solomon Islands. Hadoram Shirihai, the Israeli ornithologist, finally managed to confirm the species' continuing existence. In 2003, he had made some of the tentative sightings, and returning to the area in July and August 2007, he observed and photographed some 30 birds, including juveniles and adults. Sightings were especially frequent near Cape St George, New Ireland. A bird that had recently died was collected as the third specimen, finally providing definite proof of the mysterious petrels' identity. In February 2010 a live Beck's petrel, disoriented by ship's lights during night flight, landed on a cruise ship (chartered for a birdwatching tour) between New Zealand and New Guinea, and, after being closely examined, was released alive the next day.

== Breeding ==
The breeding grounds are still undiscovered. While most of the data suggests a location in the southern Bismarck Archipelago, petrels are notoriously migratory and move away from their breeding grounds after the young have fledged, often for considerable distances. It is still more likely than not that the species breeds in Melanesia southeast of New Guinea, as was hypothesized at the species' discovery.
