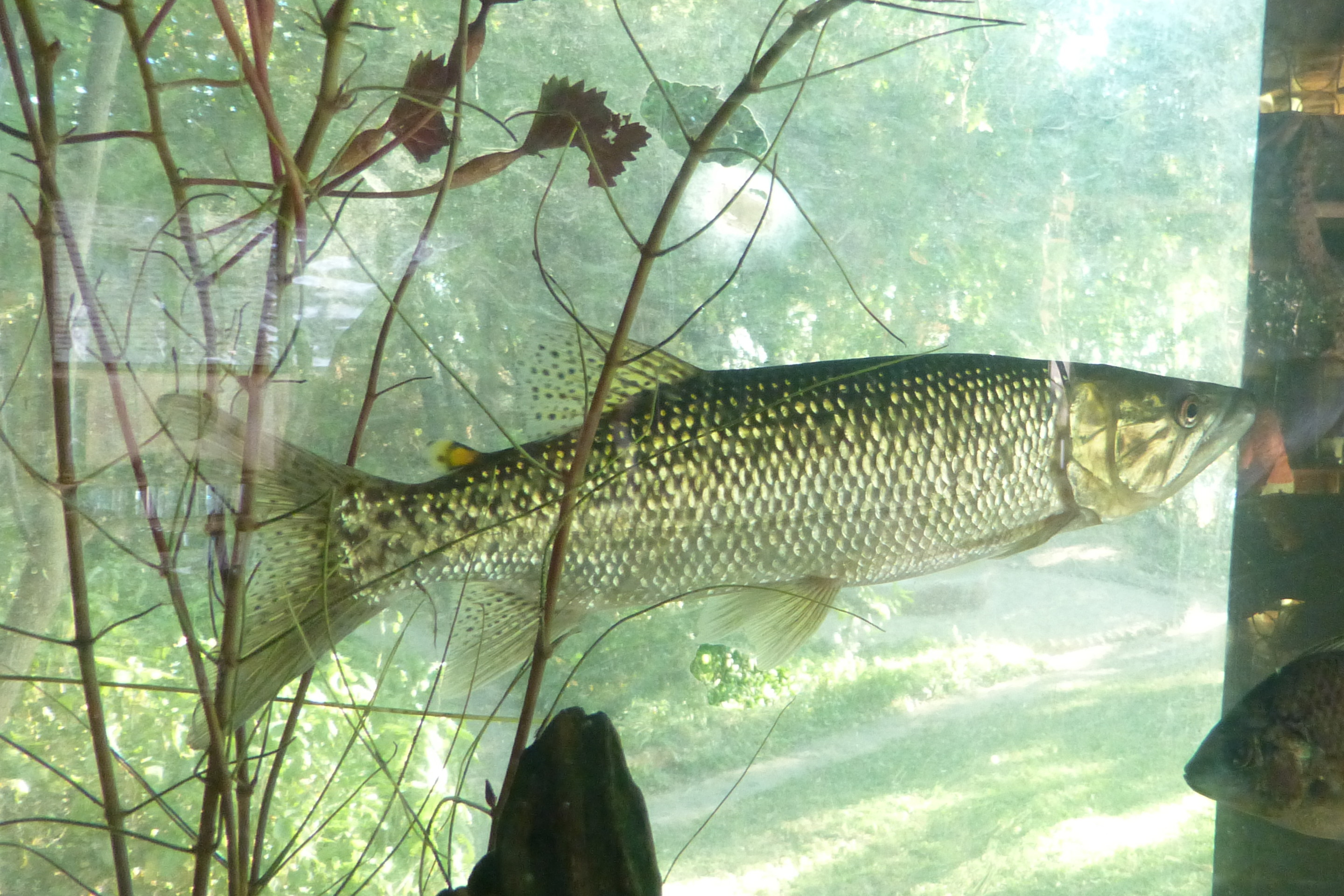
- Hepsetus cuvieri, in an Aquarium of Guma Lagoon Camp in the Okavango Delta

Conservation status
- Least Concern (IUCN 3.1)

Scientific classification
- Kingdom: Animalia
- Phylum: Chordata
- Class: Actinopterygii
- Division: Teleostei
- Order: Characiformes
- Family: Hepsetidae
- Genus: Hepsetus
- Species: H. cuvieri

Binomial name
- Hepsetus cuvieri (Castelnau, 1861)

Synonyms
- Hydrocyonoides cuvieri Castelnau, 1861

= Hepsetus cuvieri =

Species of fish

Hepsetus cuvieri, the African pike, Southern African pike characin or Kafue pike characin, is a predatory species of freshwater ray-finned fish belonging to the monotypic family Hepsetidae, the African pike characins. This fish is found in southern Africa. It was formerly classified within the single widespread African species Hepsetus odoe but this has now been split into a number of valid species.

== Taxonomy ==
Hepsetus cuvieri was first formally species described as Hydrocyonoides cuvieri in 1861 by the French naturalist François-Louis Laporte, comte de Castelnau with Lake Ngami in Botswana given as the type locality. It was long believed that only a single widespread species existed within the genus Hepsetus, H. odoe, but studies in 2011–2013 have shown that this species is restricted to parts of West and Central Africa. The well-known species of southern Africa, including Kafue River, is Hepsetus cuvieri. The genus Hepsetus is the only genus classified within the family Hepsetidae, within the superfamily Alestoidea of the suborder Characoidei in the order Characiformes, the characins.

=== Etymology ===
Hepsetis cuvieri has the genus name Hepsetus which was proposed by William Swainson in 1838, Swanson did not explain the etymology of this name but it is most likely derived from the ancient Greek hepsētós, a small fish, such as the anchovy, which is boiled for human consumption. This name, however, used for piscivorous fish resembling pikes, this may be an allusion to the Greek poet Archippus, who wrote: "An hepsetus fell in with an anchovy / And quick devoured him," and/or to the convergent South American characid Oligosarcus hepsetus. The specific name honours the French zoologist Georges Cuvier (1769–1832).

== Distribution ==
Hepsetus cuvieri is found in the southern third of Africa where it inhabits the Quanza, Cunene, Okavango, upper Zambezi, Kafue and Congo River basins. In the Congo River basin, it is only known from the southernmost part of the Kasai system and the lower Luapula.

== Description ==
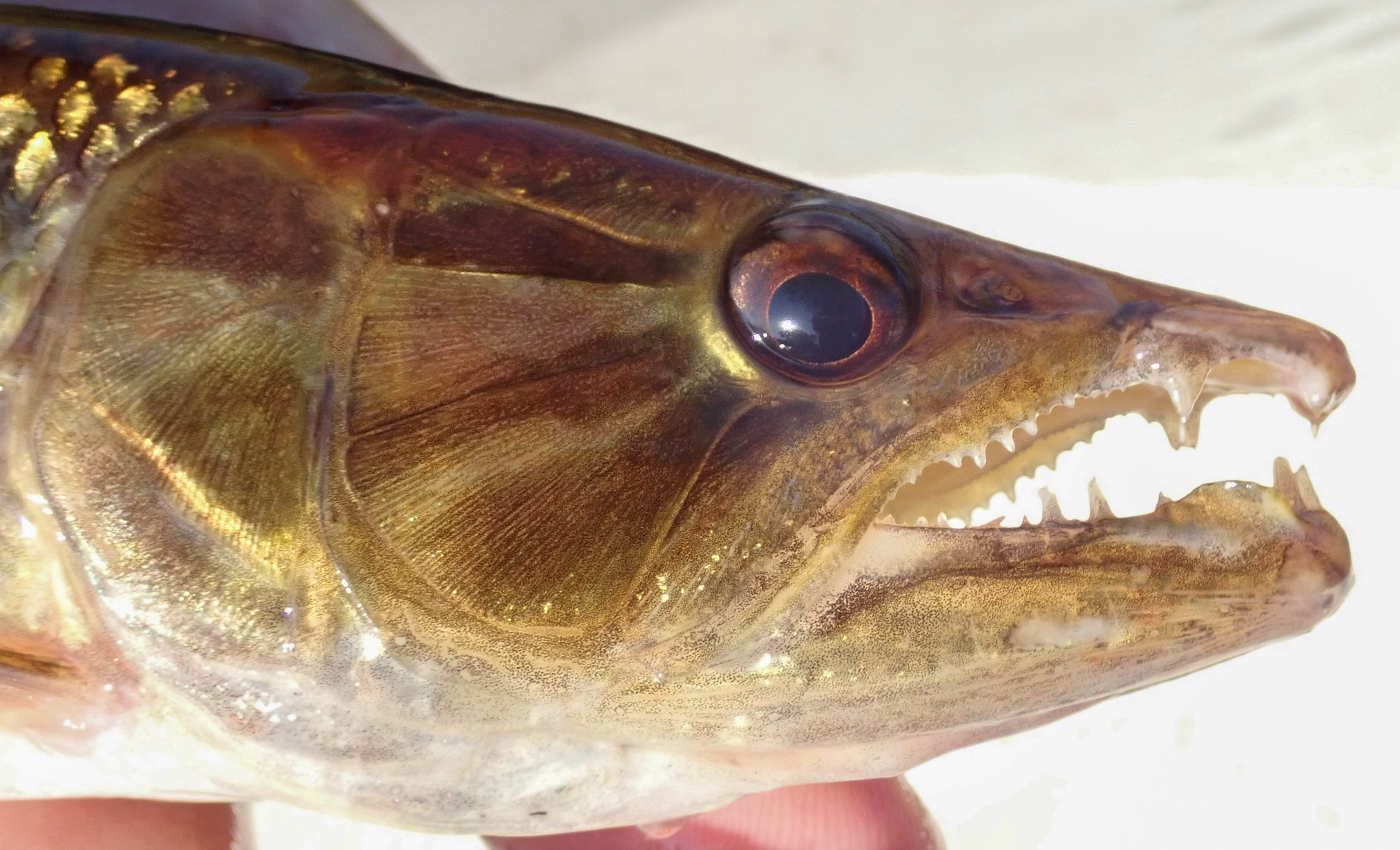
H. cuvieri

Hepsetus cuvieri can be distinguished from Hepsetus odoe as it has a lower count of gill rakers on the first gill arch, of 8–13 as opposed to 14–21; a normally higher number of scales between the lateral line and the dorsal fin, 10.5–11.5 as opposed to 7.5–10.5; a typically higher number of scales from the adipose fin and the lateral line, 6.5–7.5 as opposed to 4.5–6.5; and a distinctive colour pattern characterized by a mottled appearance of the dark brown blotches on the lateral surface of the body versus distinct vertical brown stripes in that region in H. odoe.

This species reaches maturity at a standard length of 25 cm (10 in) and the maximum recorded size is 37 cm (15 in).

== Biology ==
Hepsetus cuvieri prefers quiet, deep water, such as channels and oxbow lakes; the juveniles and fry inhabit dense marginal vegetation. The adults are mainly piscivorous while juveniles feed on smaller prey such as invertebrates and small fish. H. cuvieri is a lurking, ambush predator found in marginal swamps and lagoons of large floodplain rivers. It breeds over the summer months, spawning more than once in a free-floating bubblenest which the adults guard; it is relatively short-lived, only living for 4–5 years.

Immediately before spawning, the male and female pair up and become territorial, building large bubblenests amongst surface vegetation. They deposit the eggs into the nest and the fry move to the base of the nest upon hatching. Here they attach themselves via a gland on the top of their heads. The nest is guarded by the parents up to the point of hatching. The fry remain attached to the nest for around 4 days after which point they begin to disperse, as the nest starts to disintegrate. The fry continue to use on the sticky gland on their heads to attach themselves to pieces of vegetation etc., for a short time. Hepsetus cuvieri lives in the more unpredictable seasonal swamp and has flexible spawning times because their bubblenests allow them to reproduce even when levels of dissolved oxygen are low, so they do not have a distinct breeding season.

Hepsetus cuvieri overlaps in its distribution and habitat with the African tigerfish Hydrocynus vittatus and there is also a large degree of overlap in prey. The tigerfish prefers open, better oxygenated water and hunts by rapid pursuit of prey while H. cuvieri prefers dense vegetation where it is an ambush predator. H. vittatus is also known to prey on H. cuvieri, while it is almost unknown for H. cuvieri to prey on tigerfish.

== Conservation status ==
Hepsetus cuvieri has a wide geographical range and there are no major, widespread threats to the populations of this fish which have been identified. The International Union for Conservation of Nature, therefore, classifies this species as Least Concern.
