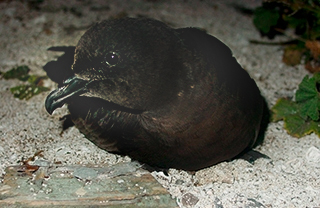
- Bulwer's petrel (Bulweria bulwerii)

Scientific classification
- Kingdom: Animalia
- Phylum: Chordata
- Class: Aves
- Order: Procellariiformes
- Family: Procellariidae
- Genus: Bulweria; Bonaparte, 1843

Type species
- Procellaria bulweria (Bulwer's petrel) Jardine & Selby, 1828

Species
- Bulweria bulwerii Bulweria fallax †Bulweria bifax

= Bulweria =

Genus of birds

Bulweria is a genus of seabirds in the family Procellariidae named after English naturalist James Bulwer. The genus has two extant species, Bulwer's petrel and Jouanin's petrel. A third species, the Olson's petrel, became extinct in the early 16th century; it is known only from skeletal remains. Bulwer's petrel ranges in the Atlantic, Indian and Pacific Oceans, whereas Joaunin's petrel is confined to the northwestern Indian Ocean. Olson's petrel is known from the Atlantic.

Bulweria petrels have long been considered related to the gadfly petrels in the genus Pterodroma, but recent mtDNA cytochrome b sequence analysis has proven them to be closely related to the shearwaters in the genus Puffinus and especially the Procellaria petrels.

== Taxonomy ==
The genus Bulweria was introduced in 1843 by the French naturalist Charles Lucien Bonaparte to accommodate Bulwer's petrel. The petrel had originally been placed in the genus Procellaria. The genus name is from the specific epithet for Bulwer's petrel, bulwerii. This had been coined in 1828 by the naturalists Jardine and Selby to acknowledge the artist and naturalist James Bulwer who had collected the type specimen on the island of Madeira.

The genus contains three species:

Image	Common name	Scientific name	Distribution
	Bulwer's petrel	Bulweria bulwerii (Jardine & Selby, 1828)	Cabo Verde, China, French Guiana, Indonesia, Japan, Malaysia, Mauritania, Morocco, Saint Helena, Ascension and Tristan da Cunha, Senegal and Taiwan
	Jouanin's petrel	Bulweria fallax Jouanin, 1955	northwestern Indian Ocean.
	† Olson's petrel	Bulweria bifax Olson, 1975 (extinct)	Saint Helena.
