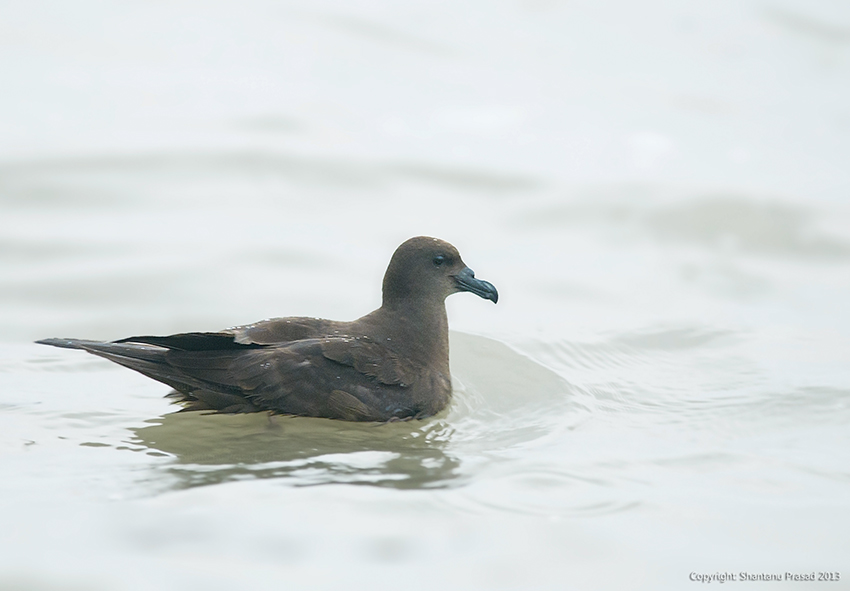
- Off the east coast of India

Conservation status
- Near Threatened (IUCN 3.1)

Scientific classification
- Kingdom: Animalia
- Phylum: Chordata
- Class: Aves
- Order: Procellariiformes
- Family: Procellariidae
- Genus: Bulweria
- Species: B. fallax

Binomial name
- Bulweria fallax Jouanin, 1955

= Jouanin's petrel =

Species of bird

Jouanin's petrel (Bulweria fallax) is a species of seabird in the family Procellariidae.

It is found throughout the northwestern Indian Ocean and has also been found in New Zealand.

Its natural habitats are open seas and shallow seas. It has been recorded breeding on Socotra, with a known breeding colony on Samhah island.

It is threatened by illegal killing.
