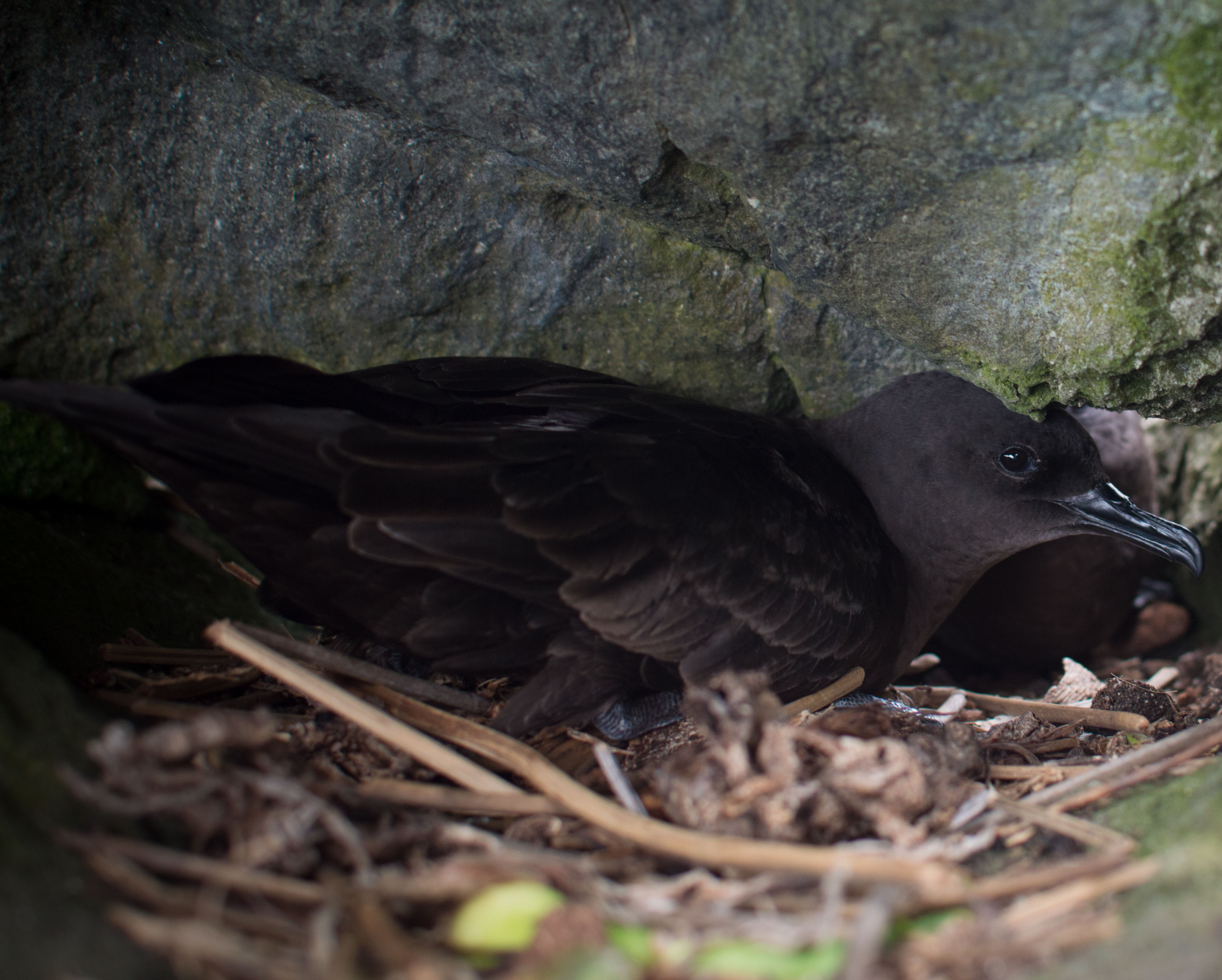

Conservation status
- Least Concern (IUCN 3.1)

Scientific classification
- Kingdom: Animalia
- Phylum: Chordata
- Class: Aves
- Order: Procellariiformes
- Family: Procellariidae
- Genus: Bulweria
- Species: B. bulwerii

Binomial name
- Bulweria bulwerii (Jardine & Selby, 1828)

= Bulwer's petrel =

Species of bird

Bulwer's petrel (Bulweria bulwerii) is a small petrel in the family Procellariidae that is found in tropical and subtropical regions of the Atlantic, Indian and Pacific Oceans. It is named after the English naturalist James Bulwer.

== Taxonomy ==
Bulwer's petrel was formally described in 1828 by the naturalists Jardine and Selby who coined the binomial name Procellaria bulwerii. The specific epithet was chosen to acknowledge the artist and naturalist James Bulwer who had collected the type specimen on the island of Madeira. Bulwer's petrel is now placed in the genus Bulweria that was introduced in 1843 by the French naturalist Charles Lucien Bonaparte. The species is monotypic: no subspecies are recognised.

== Description ==
This very long-winged petrel is 25–29 cm (9.8–11.4 in) in length with a 78–90 cm (31–35 in) wingspan. It has mainly brown plumage and a long pointed tail. It has a buoyant twisting flight as it picks planktonic food items from the ocean surface.

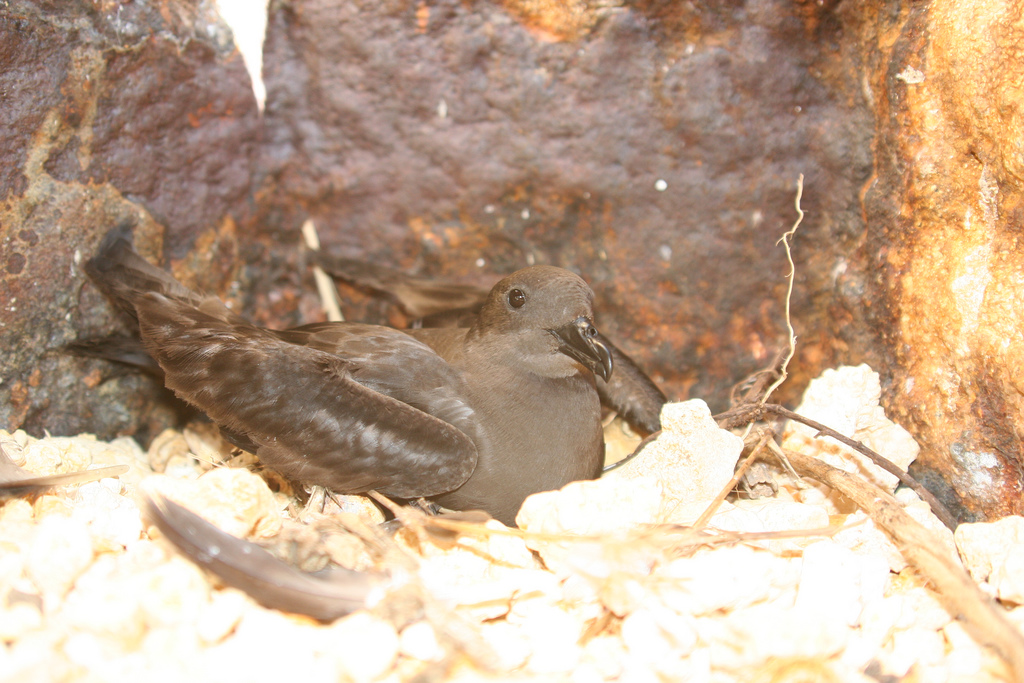
Roosting in a sea wall on Tern Island in the Northwestern Hawaiian Islands

== Distribution and habitat ==
The species has a wide distribution through tropical and subtropical regions of the Atlantic, Indian and Pacific oceans, it is a year-round resident in Cabo Verde, China, French Guiana, Indonesia, Japan, Malaysia, Mauritania, Morocco, Saint Helena, Ascension and Tristan da Cunha, Senegal and Taiwan, it breeds in the Macaronesian Islands and continental Portugal in the Atlantic; and from eastern China and the Bonin Islands, east to the Hawaiian Islands, the Marquesas Islands, the United States Minor Outlying Islands and Kiribati in the Pacific. It is marine and highly pelagic, usually found far from land except during the breeding season. This species has been sighted in Europe as a rare vagrant to Ireland, the Netherlands, France and Italy. It has also appeared as a vagrant in North America, with rare sightings far off the coast of both California and North Carolina and Australia.

== Behaviour ==
=== Breeding ===
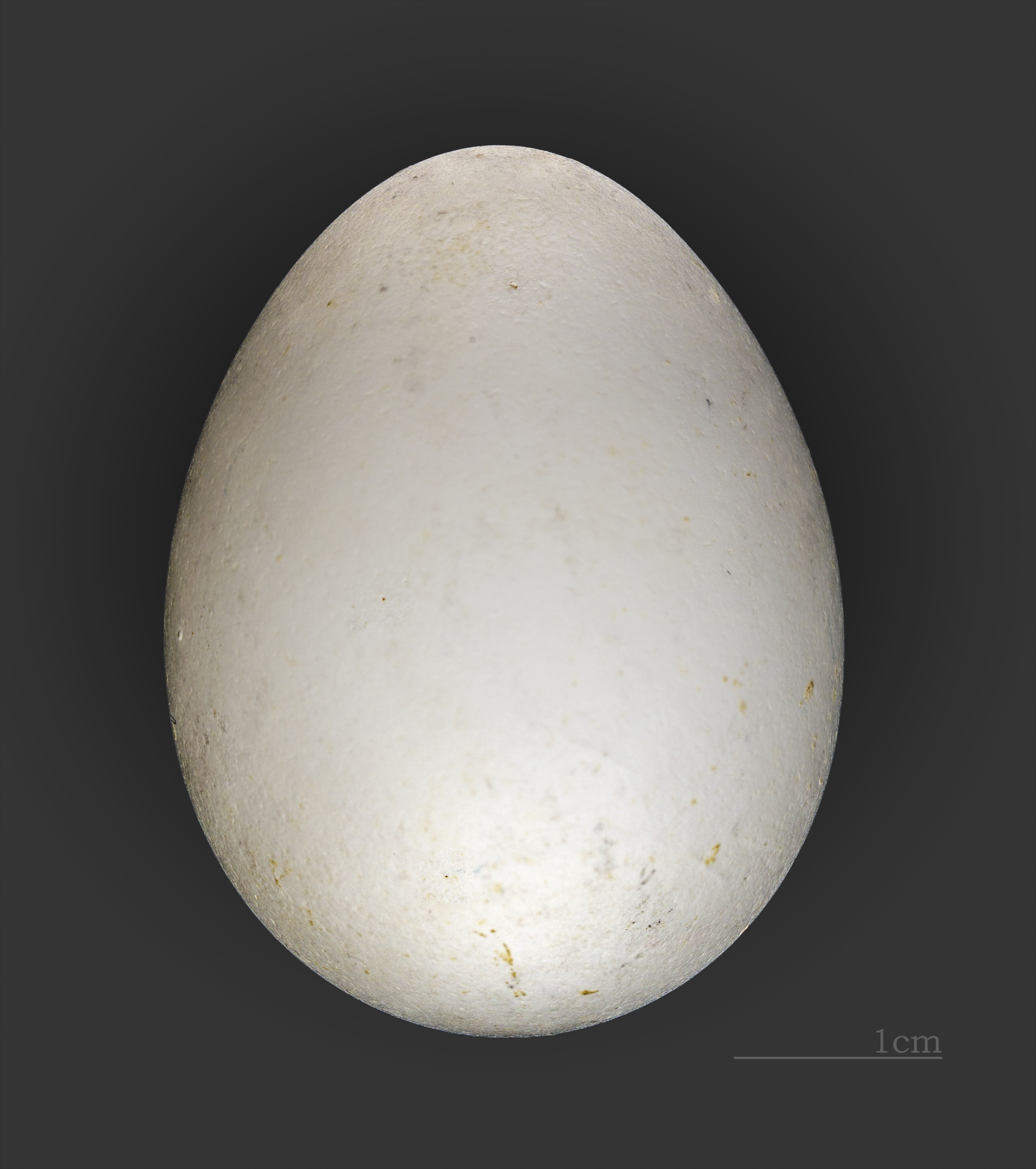
Egg of Bulwer's petrel (coll.MHNT)

Nests are built in burrows, vegetation, cliff caves/crevices, and under man-made debris and onshore driftwood. It does not excavate these burrows.

The breeding season for Bulwer's petrel starts in April and May. When breeding, it will always return to its previous nest site and mate with its previous mate. Breeding pairs form colonies of 7,000-9,000 pairs during the breeding season.

This petrel lays a clutch of one egg, although young and inexperienced birds will occasionally lay two eggs. The egg is beige-white and usually measures 42 by 30 millimetres (1.7 in × 1.2 in). Both sexes incubate the eggs for a period of 42 to 46 days. They will also both feed the chicks.

=== Feeding ===
Bulwer's petrel is highly pelagic, and rarely found near land (except during the breeding season). Its diet mainly consists of small fish (such as sardines) and squid, with some additional crustaceans (such as crabs, krill, and shrimp) and plankton.

== Threats ==
In the North East Atlantic, the species is predated by cats, house rats and endemic invertebrates. Feral cats are considered a major driver of the present distribution of the species. In the Azores, breeding areas are restricted to steep cliffs to avoid cat predation. In one colony on Madeira, predation of Shearwater chicks by Madeiran wall lizards has been recorded in up to 10% of nests, though it is highly unlikely to have an impact on the species on a population level. The large colony in the Desertas Islands suffers intense human exploitation for food or fish bait, which also occurs at a lower level in other North East Atlantic sites, although not in the Salvage Islands following the declaration of the islands as a nature reserve.

The Bulwer's petrel is thought to suffer a heightened risk of mortality from oil spills and other marine pollution, including light pollution at night. Tourism and recreational developments may reduce available habitat in breeding colonies.
