= Grand Bassin – Le Dimitile Important Bird Area =

Coordinates: 21°10′S 55°30′E

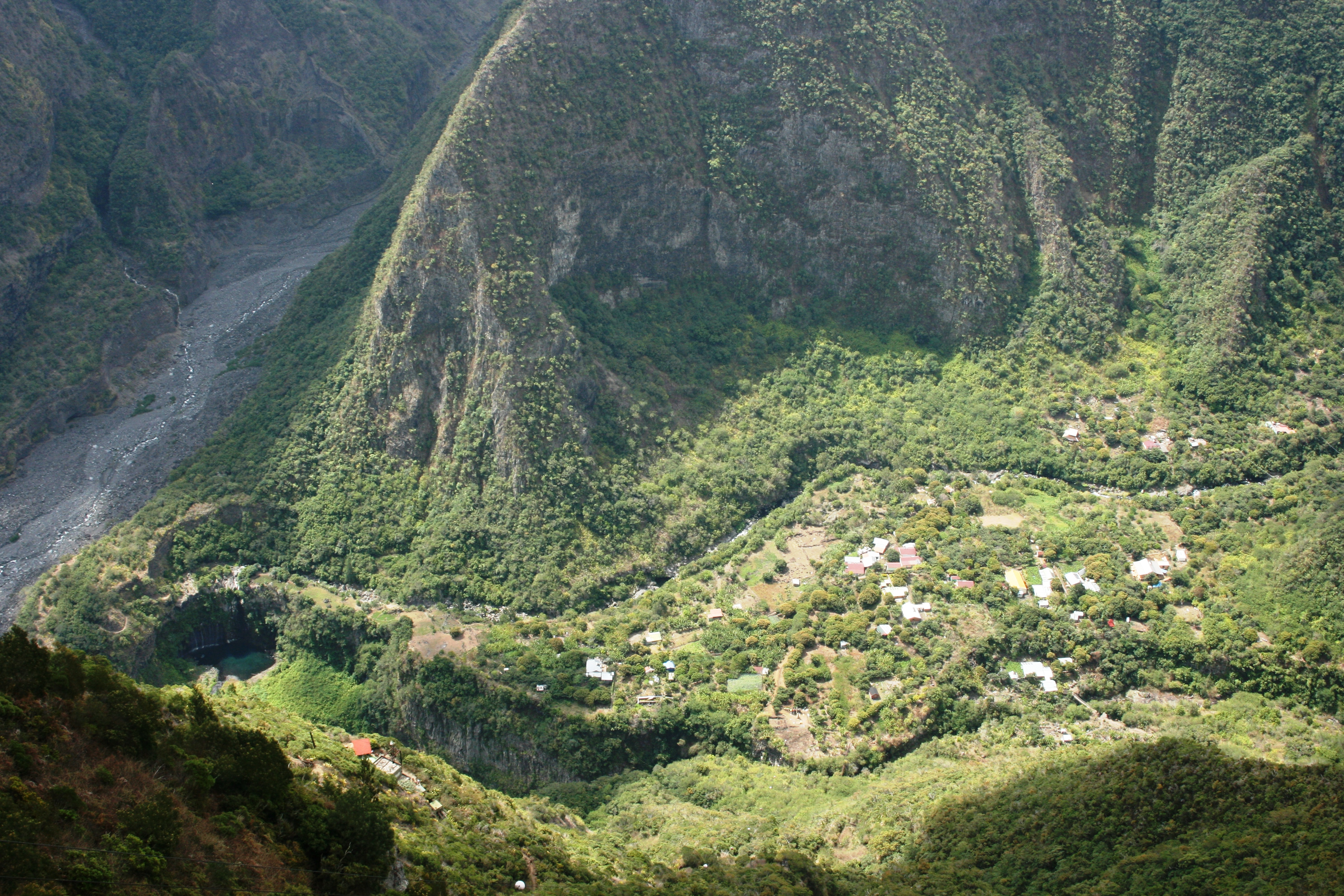
Rugged topography of Grand Bassin

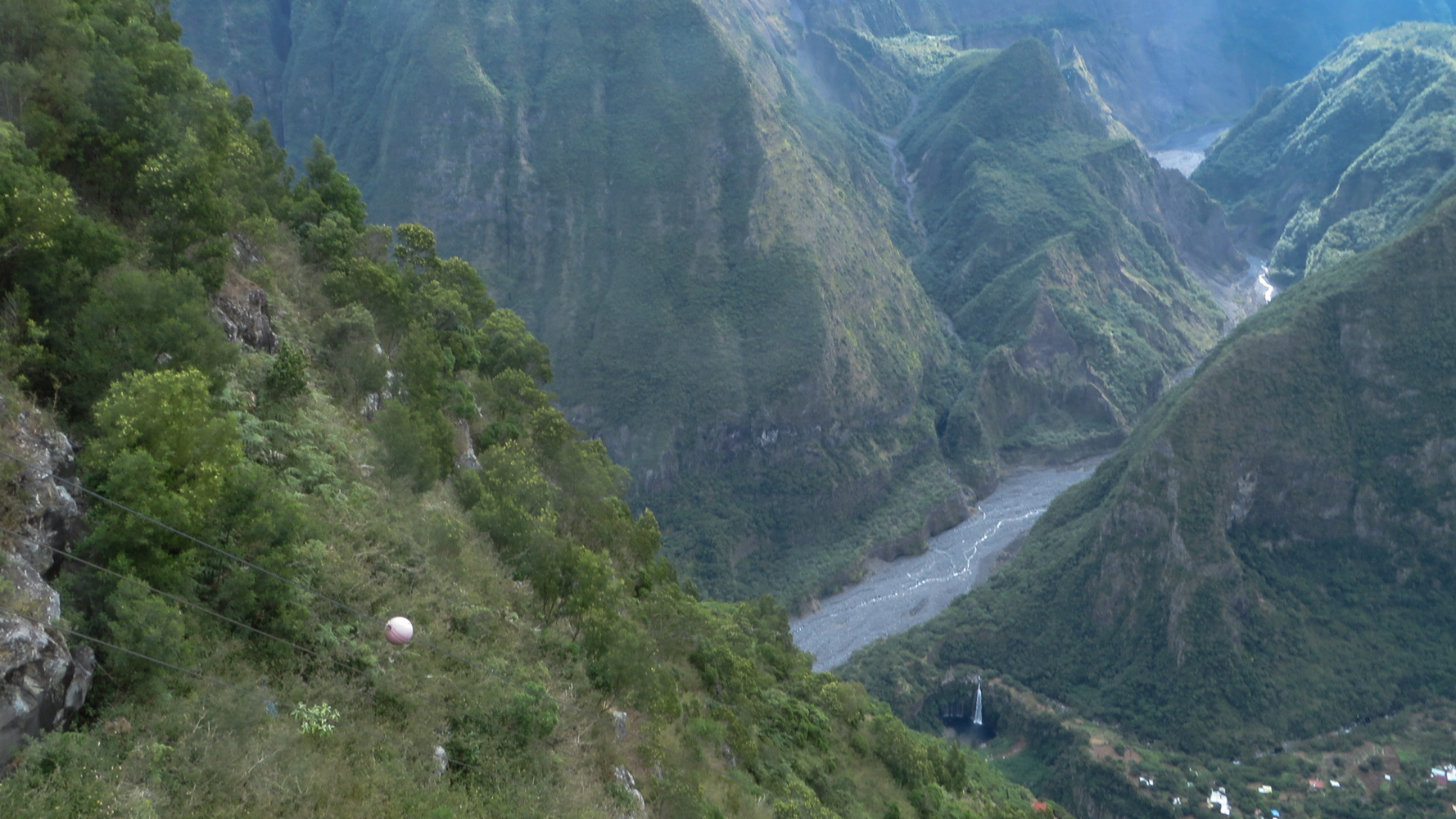
View from Bois Court towards Grand Bassin

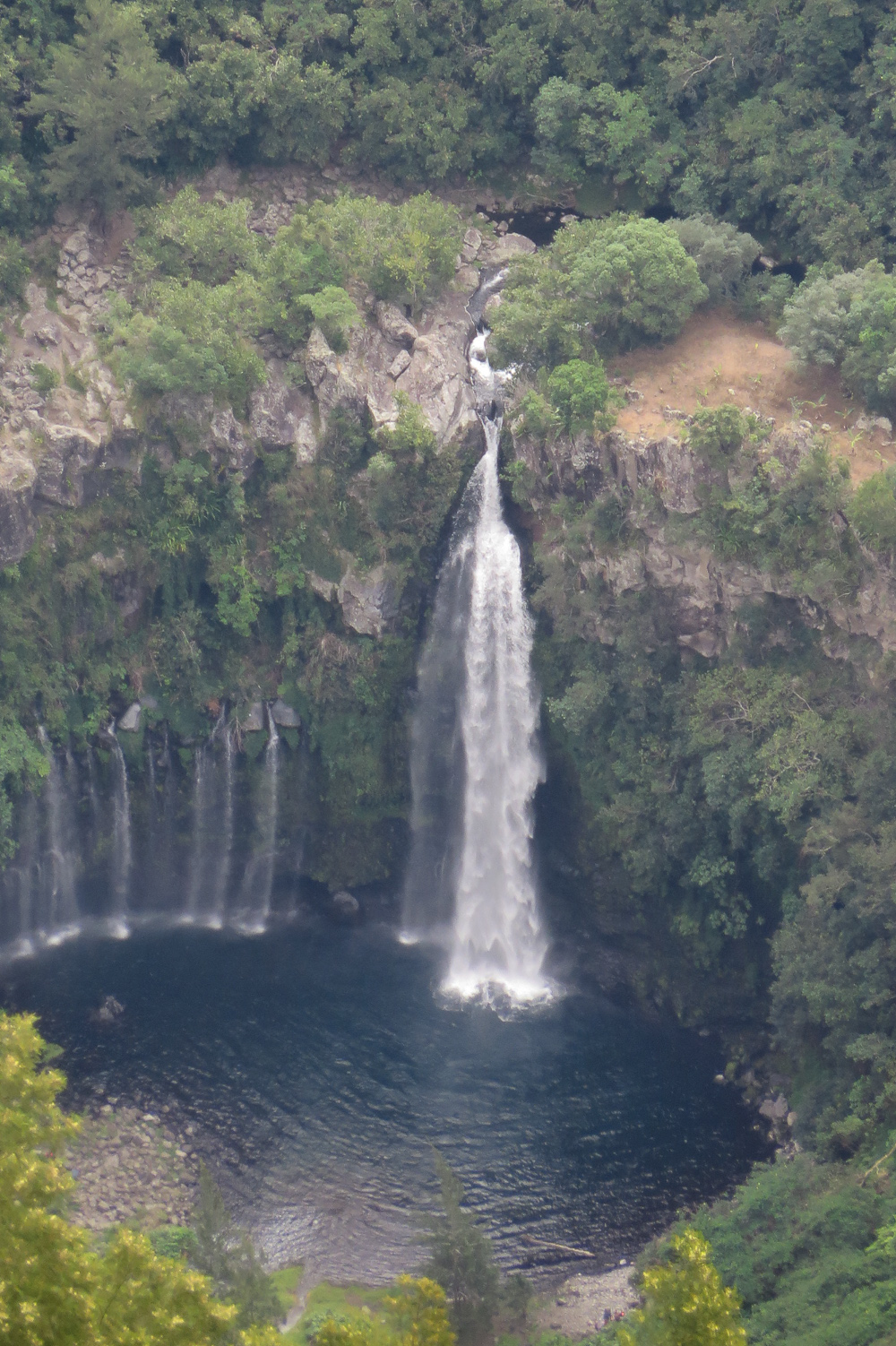
Waterfalls Bridal Veil in the Grand Bassin

Grand Bassin – Le Dimitile Important Bird Area is a 3000 ha tract of land on the island of Réunion, a French territory in the western Indian Ocean.

== Description ==
It lies within the communes of Le Tampon and Entre-Deux, on the southern slopes of the Piton des Neiges volcanic massif, and consists of an escarpment cut by eight ravines. From the south-eastern rim of the Cilaos caldera, at an elevation of 2350 m, it extends downwards to an elevation of about 550 m. The vegetation is mainly mixed mountain forest; the higher areas contain patches of bare rock, scree, and shrubland, while the lower slopes are partly deforested and are characterised by introduced vegetation, including some agricultural land.

=== Birds ===
The site has been identified by BirdLife International as an Important Bird Area (IBA) because it supports breeding colonies of Mascarene petrels and tropical shearwaters, as well as populations of Mascarene swiftlets, Mascarene paradise flycatchers, Réunion bulbuls, Réunion olive white-eyes, Mascarene white-eyes, and Réunion stonechats.
