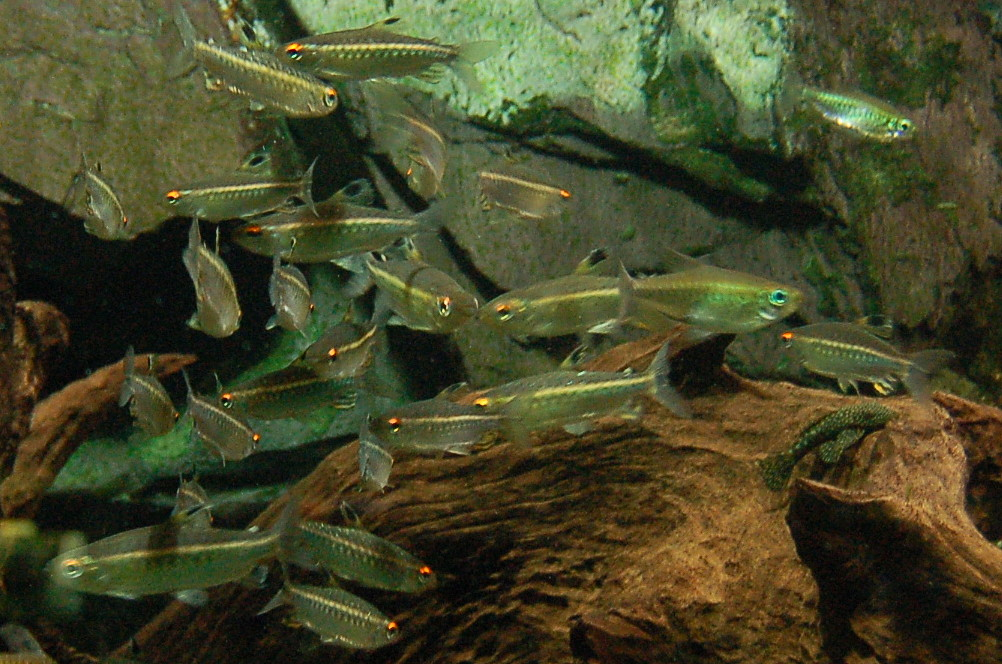

Conservation status
- Endangered (IUCN 3.1)

Scientific classification
- Kingdom: Animalia
- Phylum: Chordata
- Class: Actinopterygii
- Division: Teleostei
- Order: Characiformes
- Family: Lepidarchidae
- Genus: Arnoldichthys; Myers, 1926
- Species: A. spilopterus

Binomial name
- Arnoldichthys spilopterus (Boulenger, 1909)

Synonyms
- Petersius spilopterus Boulenger, 1909

= Arnoldichthys =

Species of fish

Arnoldichthys is monospecific genus of freshwater ray-finned fish in the family Lepidarchidae. The only species in the genus is Arnoldichthys spilopterus, the Niger tetra.

== Description and ecology ==
The Niger tetra is a tropical freshwater species found only in a limited number of locations in Nigeria. Despite the word "Niger" in its common name, it is not found in Niger. This is not a misnomer, however, since here this word refers to the Niger River, and the Niger tetra is indeed present in that river, in addition to the Ogun River.

== Biology ==
Males are on average 9.6 cm (3.8 in) long. The diet consists of worms, insects, and, crustaceans. Females in captivity can lay about 1,000 eggs, which hatch within 30–34 hours.

== Conservation ==
The Niger tetra is currently classified as endangered by the IUCN due to its limited range coupled with losses to the aquarium trade and ongoing habitat degradation.
