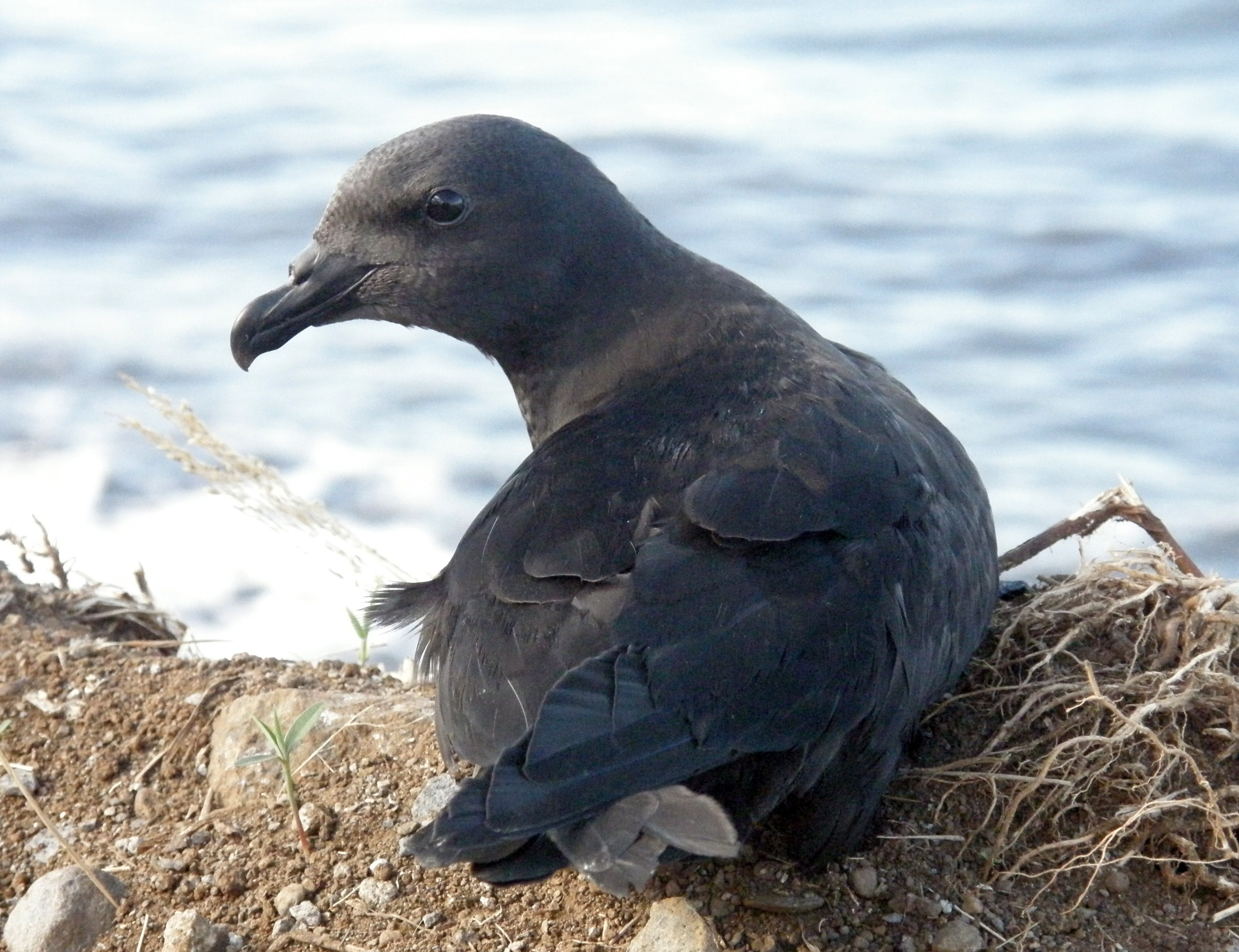

Conservation status
- Critically Endangered (IUCN 3.1)

Scientific classification
- Kingdom: Animalia
- Phylum: Chordata
- Class: Aves
- Order: Procellariiformes
- Family: Procellariidae
- Genus: Pseudobulweria
- Species: P. aterrima

Binomial name
- Pseudobulweria aterrima (Bonaparte, 1857)

Synonyms
- Pterodroma aterrima

= Mascarene petrel =

Species of bird

The Mascarene petrel (Pseudobulweria aterrima) is a medium-sized, dark petrel.

Also sometimes known as the Mascarene black petrel, this species was known from four specimens found in the nineteenth century on the island of Réunion. Two birds were found dead in the 1970s, and there have been rare observations of birds in the waters south of Réunion since 1964. It is also known from subfossil remains from the island of Rodrigues. It is known to breed in very small numbers in the Grand Bassin – Le Dimitile Important Bird Area in the mountains of Réunion. Masacarene petrels are primarily monogamous. The species is classified as critically endangered as it is inferred from the number of records that there is an extremely small population threatened by introduced species, such as feral cats and house rats, and light pollution. Despite these threats, genetic diversity of the species is high.

Public awareness campaigns resulted in the finding of 58 Mascarene petrels between 1996 and 2021. Réunion scientists reported this as part of their work to locate breeding colonies using acoustic surveys. They note that the population is declining due to predation and, by locating the colonies, conservation measures could be implemented.
