= Fiji petrel =

Conservation status
- Critically Endangered (IUCN 3.1)

Scientific classification
- Kingdom: Animalia
- Phylum: Chordata
- Class: Aves
- Order: Procellariiformes
- Family: Procellariidae
- Genus: Pseudobulweria
- Species: P. macgillivrayi

Binomial name
- Pseudobulweria macgillivrayi (Gray, 1860)

Synonyms
- Pterodroma macgillivrayi

Species of bird

The Fiji petrel (Pseudobulweria macgillivrayi), also known as MacGillivray's petrel, is a small, dark gadfly petrel.

The Fiji petrel was originally known from one immature specimen found in 1855 on Gau Island, Fiji by naturalist John MacGillivray on board HMS Herald who took the carcass to the British Museum in London. It was rediscovered in 1983, since when there have been a further 21 records, which included the capture and photographing of one adult in April 1984. This species is classified as critically endangered as it is inferred from the number of records that there is only a tiny population of less than 50 confined to a very small breeding area.

This bird is described as being 30 cm (12 in) long dark with chocolate-coloured feathers, a dark eye and bill and pale blue foot patches. It may be seen in waters around Gau Island but is believed to disperse to pelagic waters far from the island.

The rarity and significance of this species is known to local residents of Gau and it is featured on a Fijian bank note, as well as featuring in the logo for now-defunct Air Fiji. It is protected under Fijian law. In 1989, research on the ridge around possible nesting areas was terminated since it was felt that such activities, without complementary conservation action, could encourage cats to follow paths into the area.

In August 2007, a recent skin of an injured Fiji petrel, that subsequently died was made available for study in Fiji.

In May 2009, the first photographs of the bird at sea were taken approximately 25 nautical miles (46 km) south of Gau Island.
