= Archippus (poet) =

Late 5th-century BC Athenian poet of Old Comedy

Archippus (/ɑːrˈkɪpəs/; Ancient Greek: Ἅρχιππος; fl. late 5th century BC) was an Athenian poet of the Old Comedy. His most famous play was the Fishes, in which he satirized the fondness of the Athenian epicures for fish. The Alexandrian critics attributed to him the authorship of four plays previously assigned to Aristophanes (Dionysus Shipwrecked, Islands, Niobos, and Poetry). Archippus was ridiculed by his contemporaries for his fondness for playing upon words.

Titles and fragments of six plays are preserved: Amphitryon, The Donkey's Shadow, Fishes, Hercules Getting Married, Pinon, and Ploutos.
