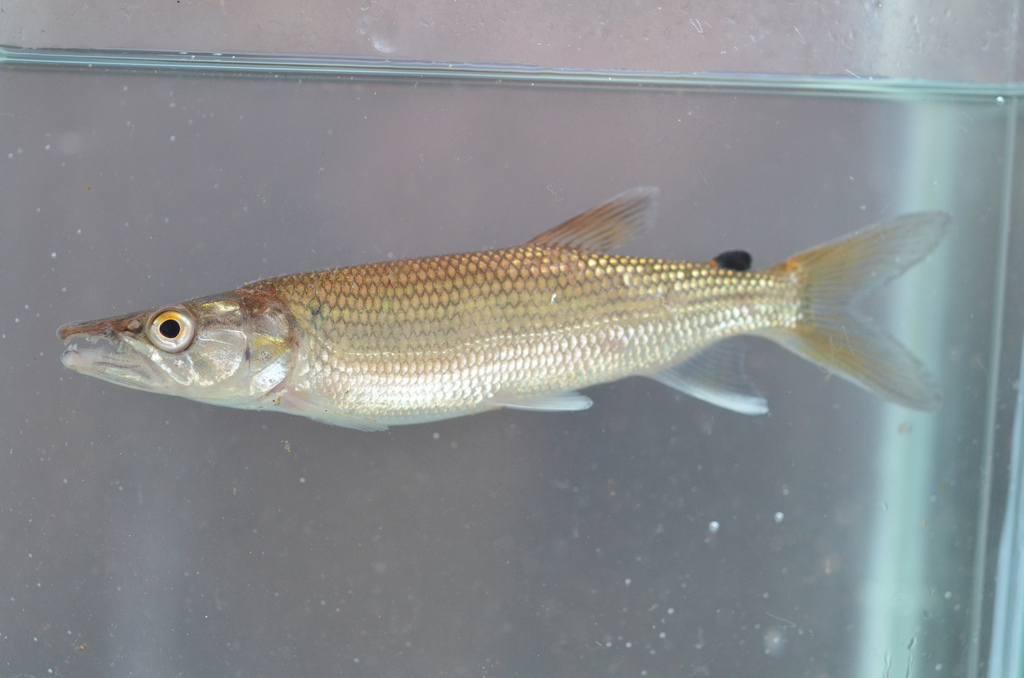
- Hepsetus lineatus

Scientific classification
- Kingdom: Animalia
- Phylum: Chordata
- Class: Actinopterygii
- Division: Teleostei
- Order: Characiformes
- Suborder: Characoidei
- Family: Hepsetidae; C. L. Hubbs, 1939
- Genus: Hepsetus; Swainson, 1838

Type species
- Salmo odoe Bloch, 1794

Synonyms
- Hydrocyonoides Castelnau, 1861; Sarcodaces Günther, 1864

= Hepsetus =

Genus of fishes

Hepsetus is a genus of freshwater ray-finned fishes belonging to the monotypic family Hepsetidae, the African pikes or African pike characins, in the order Characiformes. It was long believed that only a single widespread species existed, H. odoe, but studies in 2011–2013 have shown that this species is restricted to parts of West and Central Africa. The well-known species of southern Africa, including Kafue River, is Hepsetus cuvieri. These predatory fish reach up to 44 cm (17 in) in length.

A 2024 study found their closest relatives to be the newly defined family Lepidarchidae, which they diverged from during the Late Cretaceous. The divergence of these two families appears to have been driven by the Trans-Saharan Seaway, which served as a marine barrier between western and eastern Africa at the time.

== Species ==
There are currently six recognized species in this genus:

- Hepsetus cuvieri (Castelnau, 1861)
- Hepsetus kingsleyae Vreven, Decru & Snoeks, 2013
- Hepsetus lineatus (Pellegrin, 1926)
- Hepsetus microlepis (Boulenger, 1901)
- Hepsetus occidentalis Decru, Snoeks & Vreven, 2013
- Hepsetus odoe (Bloch, 1794)

Synonym:

- Hepsetus akawo Decru, Vreven & Snoeks, 2012 = Hepsetus odoe
