= Bryconalestes tessmanni =

Scientific classification
- Kingdom: Animalia
- Phylum: Chordata
- Class: Actinopterygii
- Order: Characiformes
- Family: Alestidae
- Genus: Bryconalestes
- Species: B. tessmanni

Binomial name
- Bryconalestes tessmanni (Pappenheim, 1911)

Synonyms
- Alestes tessmanni Pappemheim, 1911; Brycinus tessmanni (Pappemheim, 1911)

Species of fish

Bryconalestes tessmanni, Tessmann's robber, is a species of freshwater ray-finned fish belonging to the family Alestidae, the African tetras. This species is found in West-Central Africa.

== Taxonomy ==
Bryconalestes tessmanni was first formally described as Alestes tessmanni in 1911 by the German zoologist Paul Pappenheim with its type locality given as "Stream Bimfille bei Nschöba" in Equatorial Guinea at about 1.45°N, 10.35°E. In 1986 Didier Paugy divided that large genus into three informal species groups, the macrolepidotus group, the nurse group and the longipinnis group, B. tessmanni was a member of the latter group. Subsequent morphological and molecular studies showed that the longipinnis group should be classified in a separate genus, Bryconalestes, and later the nurse group was split from Brycinus into the genus Brachyalestes. The genus Bryconalestes is classified within the African tetra family, Alestidae, in the characin order Characiformes.

== Etymology ==
Bryconalestes tessmanni is classified within the genus Bryconalestes, a name which was coined by Jacobus Johannes Hoedeman without explanation. It appears to be a combination of Brycon, a Neotropical genus, or its derivative Brycinus, the genus this species was formerly classified. This is suffixed with Alestes, the type genus of the Alestidae, so this name means an alestid that resembles Brycon or Brycinus. The specific name honours the German anthropologist, explorer, botanist and zoologist Günter Tessmann, the collector of the holotype.

== Distribution ==
Bryconalestes tessmanni is found in Cameroon and Equatorial Guinea.
