= Alestopetersius hilgendorfi =

Conservation status
- Least Concern (IUCN 3.1)

Scientific classification
- Kingdom: Animalia
- Phylum: Chordata
- Class: Actinopterygii
- Order: Characiformes
- Family: Alestidae
- Genus: Alestopetersius
- Species: A. hilgendorfi

Binomial name
- Alestopetersius hilgendorfi (Boulenger), 1899

Synonyms
- Petersius hilgendorfi Boulenger, 1899; Phenacogrammus hilgendorfi (Boulenger 1899); Petersius modestus Boulenger, 1899

Species of fish

Alestopetersius hilgendorfi is a species of freshwater ray-finned fish belonging to the family Alestidae, the African tetras. This species is found in the middle Congo River basin in the Democratic Republic of the Congo.

== Description ==
Alestopetersius hilgendorfi reaches a total length of 10.0 cm (3.9 in).

== Etymology ==
The species epithet is named in honor of zoologist and paleontologist Franz Hilgendorf (1839-1904), who was the one who erected the genus Petersius in 1894.
