= Nannopetersius mutambuei =

Scientific classification
- Kingdom: Animalia
- Phylum: Chordata
- Class: Actinopterygii
- Order: Characiformes
- Family: Alestidae
- Genus: Nannopetersius
- Species: N. mutambuei

Binomial name
- Nannopetersius mutambuei Lunkayilakio & Vreven, 2008

Species of fish

Nannopetersius mutambuei is a species of freshwater ray-finned fish belonging to the family Alestidae, the African tetras. It is endemic to the Inkisi River upstream of the Sanga dam in the lower Congo River basin, in the Democratic Republic of the Congo.

== Description ==
Nannopetersius mutambuei reaches a standard length of 12.0 cm (4.7 in).

== Etymology ==
The species epithet is named in honor of Prof. Mutambue Shango, the General Academic Secretary, of the École Régionale post-universitaire d’Aménagement et gestion Intégrée des Forêts et territoires Tropicaux in Kinshasa, Democratic Republic of the Congo, who was responsible for collecting many fishes from the Inkisi River basin in 1985 and 1986.
