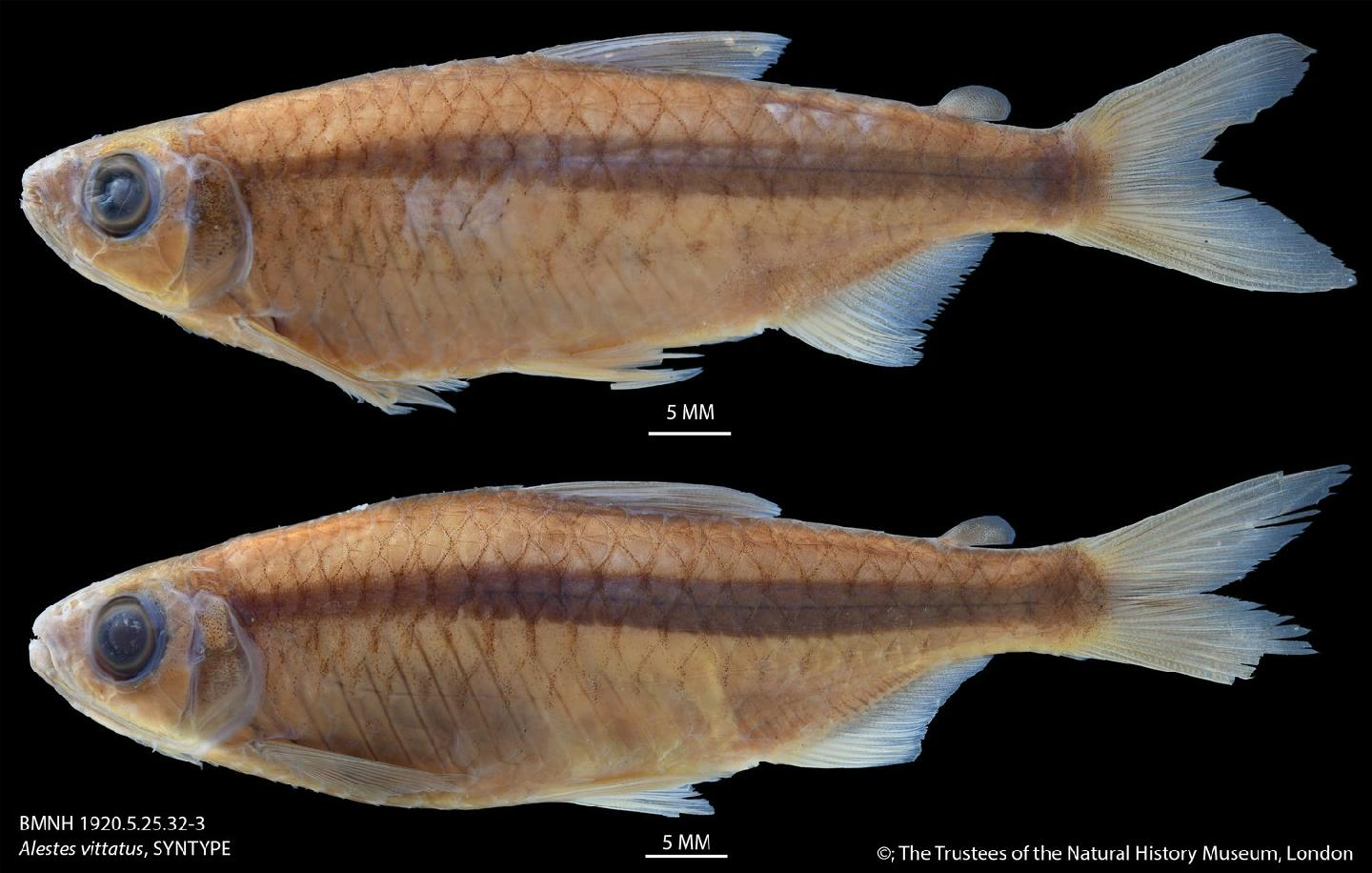

Conservation status
- Data Deficient (IUCN 3.1)

Scientific classification
- Kingdom: Animalia
- Phylum: Chordata
- Class: Actinopterygii
- Order: Characiformes
- Family: Alestidae
- Genus: Micralestes
- Species: M. vittatus

Binomial name
- Micralestes vittatus (Boulenger, 1917)

Synonyms
- Alestes vittatus Boulenger, 1917

= Micralestes vittatus =

Species of fish

Micralestes vittatus is a species of freshwater ray-finned fish belonging to the family Alestidae, the African tetras. It is endemic to Tanzania. Its natural habitat is rivers.
