= Brycinus rhodopleura =

Conservation status
- Least Concern (IUCN 3.1)

Scientific classification
- Kingdom: Animalia
- Phylum: Chordata
- Class: Actinopterygii
- Order: Characiformes
- Family: Alestidae
- Genus: Brycinus
- Species: B. rhodopleura

Binomial name
- Brycinus rhodopleura (Boulenger, 1906)

Synonyms
- Alestes rhodopleura Boulenger, 1906

Species of fish

Brycinus rhodopleura is a species of freshwater ray-finned fish belonging to the family Alestidae, the African tetras. It is endemic to Tanzania. Its natural habitats are rivers and freshwater lakes. They are known for being in Lake Tanganyika and the Malagarazi River.
