= Redfin robber =

Conservation status
- Least Concern (IUCN 3.1)

Scientific classification
- Kingdom: Animalia
- Phylum: Chordata
- Class: Actinopterygii
- Order: Characiformes
- Family: Alestidae
- Genus: Brachyalestes
- Species: B. affinis

Binomial name
- Brachyalestes affinis (Günther,1894)

Synonyms
- Alestes affinis Günther, 1894; Brycinus affinis (Günther, 1894)

Species of fish

The redfin robber (Brachyalestes affinis) is a species of fish in the family Alestidae. It is endemic to Tanzania. Its natural habitats are rivers and freshwater lakes.
