= Phenacogrammus deheyni =

Conservation status
- Least Concern (IUCN 3.1)

Scientific classification
- Kingdom: Animalia
- Phylum: Chordata
- Class: Actinopterygii
- Order: Characiformes
- Family: Alestidae
- Genus: Phenacogrammus
- Species: P. deheyni

Binomial name
- Phenacogrammus deheyni Poll, 1945

Species of fish

Phenacogrammus deheyni is a species of freshwater ray-finned fish belonging to the family Alestidae, the African tetras. It is found in the middle Congo River, the Ruki drainage, of the Mongala and Aruwimi rivers in the Democratic Republic of the Congo.

== Description ==
Phenacogrammus deheyni reaches a total length of 10.0 cm (3.9 in).

== Etymology ==
The tetra is named in honor of diplomat/naturalist Jean Jacques Deheyn (b. 1914), of the Royal Museum of Central Africa, who collected the type specimen.
