= Alestopetersius conspectus =

Scientific classification
- Kingdom: Animalia
- Phylum: Chordata
- Class: Actinopterygii
- Order: Characiformes
- Family: Alestidae
- Genus: Alestopetersius
- Species: A. conspectus

Binomial name
- Alestopetersius conspectus Mbimbe Maye Munene & Stiassny, 2012

Species of African tetras

Alestopetersius conspectus is a species of freshwater ray-finned fish belonging to the family Alestidae, the African tetras. It is found in Kwilu River in the middle Congo River basin in the Democratic Republic of the Congo.

== Description ==
Alestopetersius conspectus reaches a standard length of 5.7 cm (2.2 in).
