= Phenacogrammus stigmatura =

Conservation status
- Data Deficient (IUCN 3.1)

Scientific classification
- Kingdom: Animalia
- Phylum: Chordata
- Class: Actinopterygii
- Order: Characiformes
- Family: Alestidae
- Genus: Phenacogrammus
- Species: P. stigmatura

Binomial name
- Phenacogrammus stigmatura (Fowler, 1936)

Synonyms
- Micralestes stigmatura Fowler, 1936; Alestopetersius stigmatura (Fowler, 1936)

Species of fish

Phenacogrammus stigmatura is a species of freshwater ray-finned fish belonging to the family Alestidae, the African tetras. It is found in Cameroon.

== Description ==
Phenacogrammus stigmatura reaches a total length of 5.4 cm (2.1 in).
