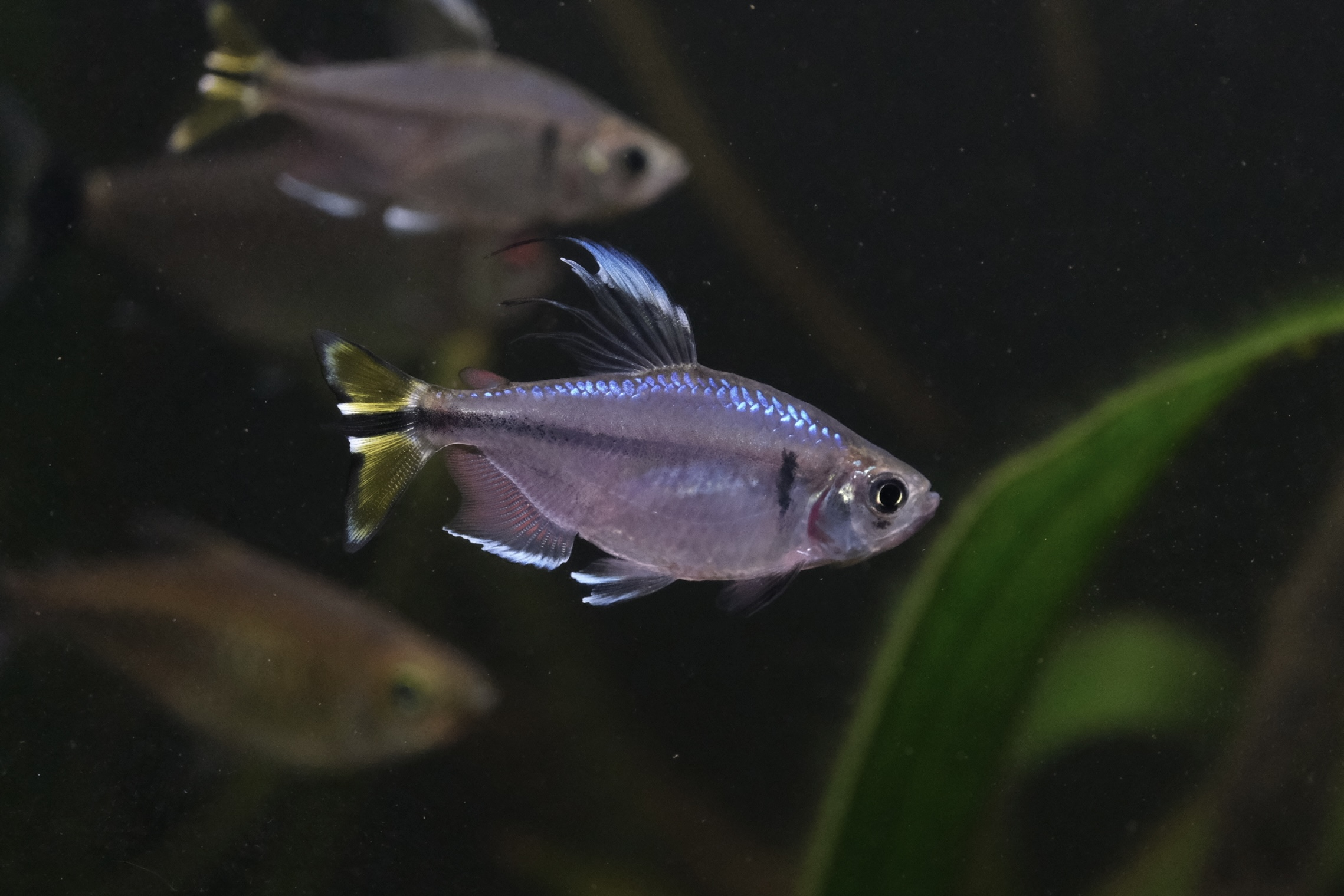

Conservation status
- Least Concern (IUCN 3.1)

Scientific classification
- Kingdom: Animalia
- Phylum: Chordata
- Class: Actinopterygii
- Order: Characiformes
- Family: Alestidae
- Genus: Alestopetersius
- Species: A. caudalis

Binomial name
- Alestopetersius caudalis Boulenger, 1899

Synonyms
- Petersius caudalis Boulenger, 1899; Phenacogrammus caudalis (Boulenger 1899); Petersius brumpti Pellegrin, 1906; Petersius xenurus Boulenger, 1920; Micralestes grandi Fowler, 1936

= Yellow-tailed African tetra =

Species of fish

The yellow-tailed African tetra (Alestopetersius caudalis) is a species of freshwater ray-finned fish belonging to the African tetra family Alestidae. This species is found in the Congo River basin, in both the DRC and the Republic of the Congo (via an unsubstantiated report).

== Reproduction ==
The yellow-tailed African tetra is an egg scatterer and exhibits no parental care.

== Sexual dimorphism ==
Adult males are more colorful than females, and, unlike females, have extended white-tipped dorsal, pelvic, anal and caudal fins. Additionally, males appear to grow faster than females.

== Conservation status ==
The IUCN Red List includes the yellow-tailed African tetra as a Least Concern species, and trends in its wild population have not been identified.

== In the aquarium ==
The yellow-tailed African tetra is an omnivore, feeding on crustaceans, fallen fruits and small insects, but seems to have little difficulty in adjusting to normal aquarium foods. It can be fed Daphnia, bloodworm and Artemia, along with dried flakes and granules, at least some of which should include plant or algal content. A temperature of 22–26 °C (72–79 °F) and a pH between 5.0 and 7.5 is suitable.

To breed this species in a home aquarium, one method is apparently keeping a group of adults in their own aquarium furnished with a kind of artificial trap, and then checking it as regularly as possible for eggs. Eggs should be removed as they are detected so that they can hatch in smaller containers. The fry should be offered microscopic foods until they are large enough to accept food suitable for adults.
