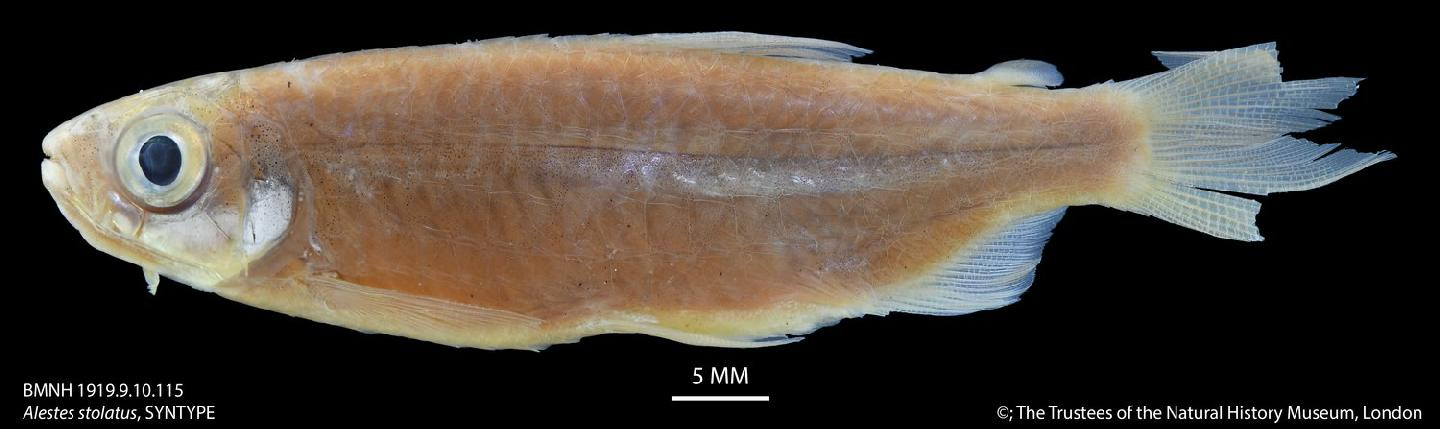

Conservation status
- Least Concern (IUCN 3.1)

Scientific classification
- Kingdom: Animalia
- Phylum: Chordata
- Class: Actinopterygii
- Order: Characiformes
- Family: Alestidae
- Genus: Micralestes
- Species: M. stormsi

Binomial name
- Micralestes stormsi Boulenger, 1902

Synonyms
- Alestes stolatus Boulenger, 1920

= Micralestes stormsi =

Species of fish

Micralestes stormsi is a species of freshwater ray-finned fish belonging to the family Alestidae, the African tetras. It is found in Burundi, the Democratic Republic of the Congo, Tanzania and Zambia. Its natural habitat is rivers.

The fish is named in honor of Lieut. Maurice Joseph Auguste Marie Raphael Storms (1875-1941), of the Belgian Army, who collected the type specimen and presented it to the Brussels Museum. The describer, Boulenger said Storms is the cousin of Raymond Storms, who was "so well known for his important contributions to paleoichthyology".
