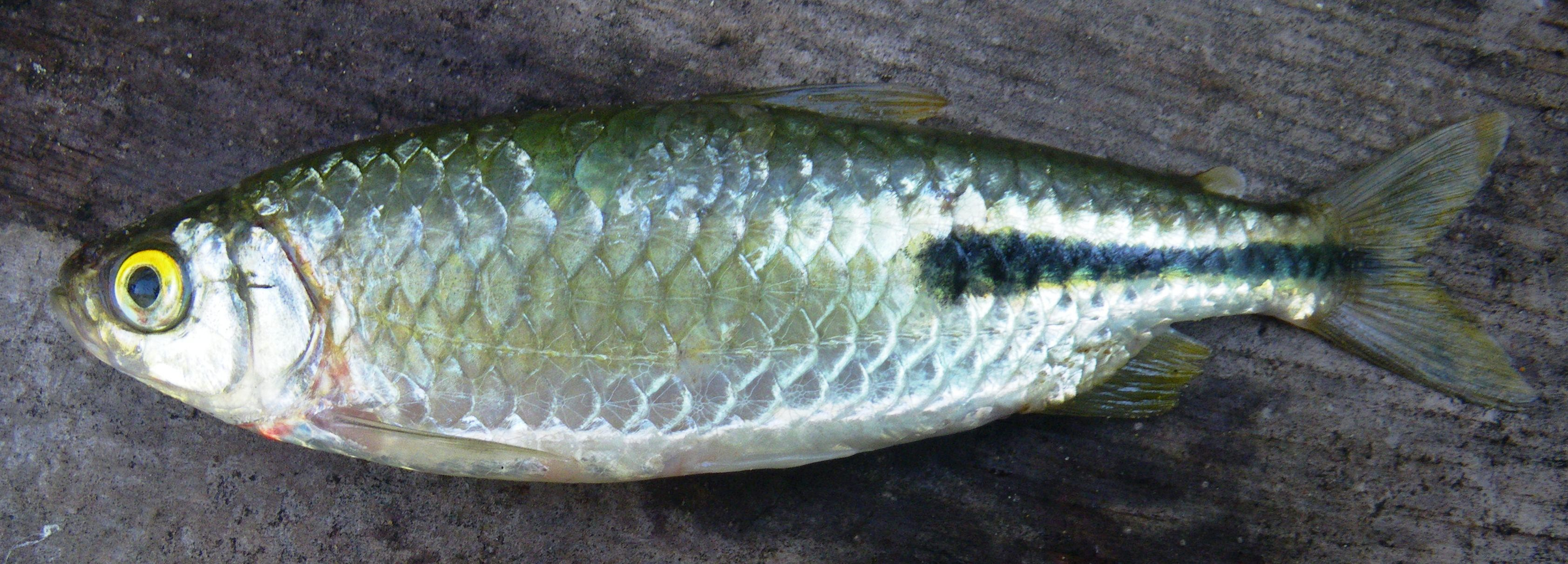

Conservation status
- Least Concern (IUCN 3.1)

Scientific classification
- Kingdom: Animalia
- Phylum: Chordata
- Class: Actinopterygii
- Order: Characiformes
- Family: Alestidae
- Genus: Brachyalestes
- Species: B. peringueyi

Binomial name
- Brachyalestes peringueyi Boulenger, 1923

Synonyms
- Alestes peringuei Boulenger, 1923; Alestes peringueyi Boulenger, 1923; Alestes péringueyi Boulenger, 1923; Brycinus peringuei Boulenger, 1923; Brycinus peringueyi Boulenger, 1923

= Brachyalestes peringueyi =

Species of fish

Brachyalestes peringueyi is a species of freshwater fish in the African tetra family (Alestidae) of order Characiformes. It is endemic to the Luapula-Mweru system of the upper Congo Basin in the Democratic Republic of the Congo and Zambia.

== Taxonomy and etymology ==
Brachyalestes peringueyi was first described by George Albert Boulenger in 1923. It has also been referred to by the basionym Alestes peringueyi and the synonym Brycinus peringueyi. The specific name honors Louis Péringuey, a French naturalist. The fish is classified in the Alestidae family (the African tetras) in the order Characiformes. The holotype was collected in Zambia.

== Ecology ==
Brachyalestes peringueyi is found in the Democratic Republic of the Congo and Zambia, where it is endemic to the upper Congo Basin's Luapula-Mweru system, occurring in lakes and rivers. It is a pelagic fish that grows up to 13.3 centimetres (5.2 in) in total length.

This species is fished with nets and its population has been threatened by overfishing. Despite this, it is assessed as a least concern species on the IUCN Red List because of its broad range.
