= Striped robber =

Conservation status
- Least Concern (IUCN 3.1)

Scientific classification
- Kingdom: Animalia
- Phylum: Chordata
- Class: Actinopterygii
- Order: Characiformes
- Family: Alestidae
- Genus: Brachyalestes
- Species: B. lateralis

Binomial name
- Brachyalestes lateralis (Boulenger, 1900)

Synonyms
- Alestes lateralis Boulenger, 1900; Brycinus lateralis (Boulenger 1900); Alestes natalensis Boulenger, 1904; Alestes langii Fowler, 1935; Alestes thamalakanensis Fowler, 1935

Species of fish

The striped robber (Brachyalestes lateralis) is a species of freshwater ray-finned fish belonging to the family Alestidae, the African tetras. It is found in Angola, Botswana, Malawi, Mozambique, Namibia, South Africa, Zambia and Zimbabwe. Its natural habitats are rivers and inland deltas.
