= Phenacogrammus polli =

Conservation status
- Least Concern (IUCN 3.1)

Scientific classification
- Kingdom: Animalia
- Phylum: Chordata
- Class: Actinopterygii
- Order: Characiformes
- Family: Alestidae
- Genus: Phenacogrammus
- Species: P. polli

Binomial name
- Phenacogrammus polli J. G. Lambert, 1961

Species of fish

Phenacogrammus polli is a species of freshwater ray-finned fish belonging to the family Alestidae, the African tetras. It is found in the middle Congo River basin in the Ruki River drainage, the Lomami river and the Lindi-Tshopo river in the Democratic Republic of the Congo.

== Description ==
Phenacogrammus polli reaches a total length of 3.2 cm (1.3 in).

== Etymology ==
The tetra is named in honor of Belgian ichthyologist Max Poll (1908-1991).
