= Sadler's robber =

Conservation status
- Least Concern (IUCN 3.1)

Scientific classification
- Kingdom: Animalia
- Phylum: Chordata
- Class: Actinopterygii
- Order: Characiformes
- Family: Alestidae
- Genus: Brachyalestes
- Species: B. sadleri

Binomial name
- Brachyalestes sadleri (Boulenger, 1906)

Synonyms
- Alestes sadleri Boulenger, 1906; Brycinus sadleri (Boulenger, 1906); Micralestes lerneri Nichols & LaMonte, 1938

Species of fish

Sadler's robber (Brachyalestes sadleri) is a species of freshwater ray-finned fish belonging to the family Alestidae, the African tetras. It is found in Burundi, Kenya, and Uganda. Its natural habitats are rivers and freshwater lakes. It is not considered a threatened species by the IUCN.
