= Alestopetersius bifasciatus =

Conservation status
- Least Concern (IUCN 3.1)

Scientific classification
- Kingdom: Animalia
- Phylum: Chordata
- Class: Actinopterygii
- Order: Characiformes
- Family: Alestidae
- Genus: Alestopetersius
- Species: A. bifasciatus

Binomial name
- Alestopetersius bifasciatus Poll, 1967

Synonyms
- Duboisialestes bifasciatus Poll, 1967

Species of fish

Alestopetersius bifasciatus is a species of freshwater ray-finned fish belonging to the family Alestidae, the African tetras. It is found in Lake Tumba and the Tshuapa River with related rivers in the middle Congo River basin in the Democratic Republic of the Congo.

== Description ==
Alestopetersius bifasciatus reaches a standard length of 5.7 cm (2.2 in).
