= Nannopetersius lamberti =

Conservation status
- Least Concern (IUCN 3.1)

Scientific classification
- Kingdom: Animalia
- Phylum: Chordata
- Class: Actinopterygii
- Order: Characiformes
- Family: Alestidae
- Genus: Nannopetersius
- Species: N. lamberti

Binomial name
- Nannopetersius lamberti Poll, 1967

Species of fish

Nannopetersius lamberti is a species of freshwater ray-finned fish belonging to the family Alestidae, the African tetras. It is found in the African river basins of the Ntem, the Ogooué, the Nyanga and the Kouilou Rivers.

== Description ==
Nannopetersius lamberti reaches a standard length of 7.0 cm (2.8 in).

== Etymology ==
The species epithet is named in honor of Belgian ichthyologist Jacques G. Lambert (1923-2013), who collected the type specimen.
