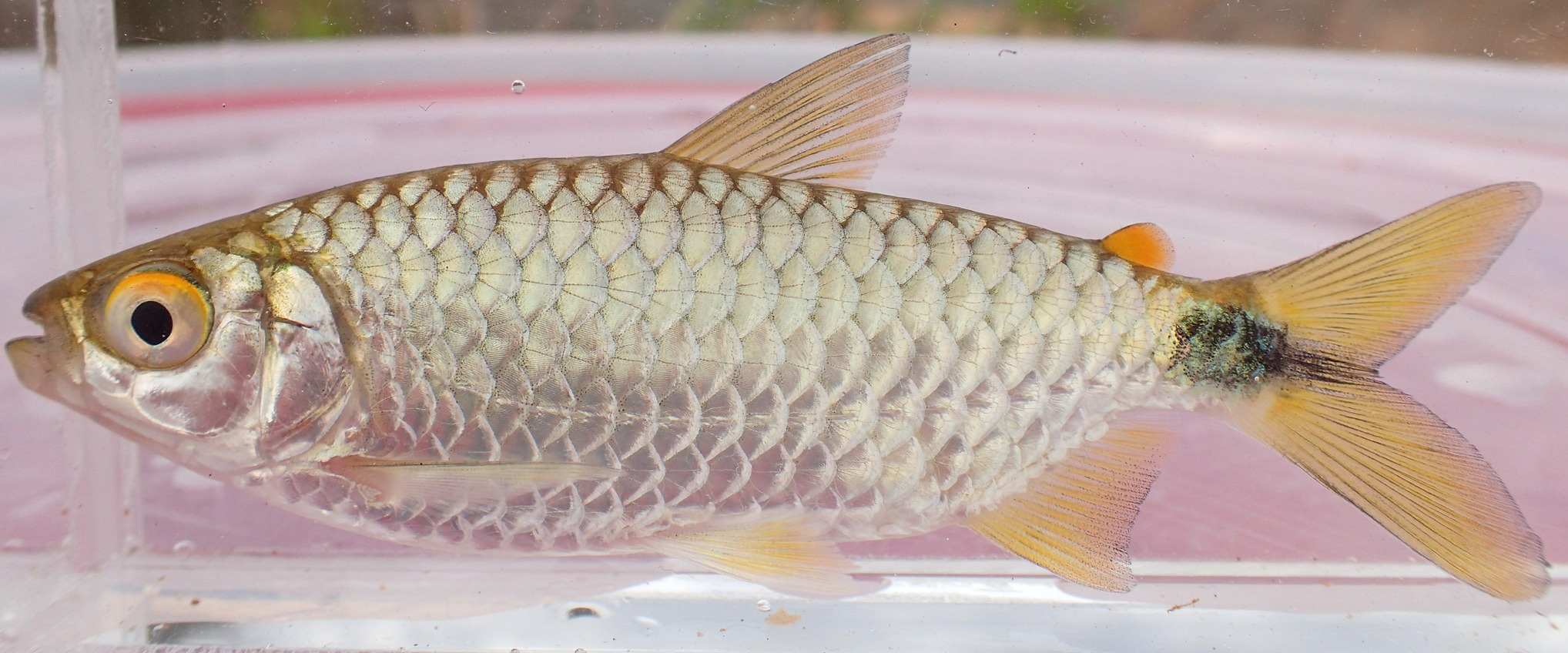

Conservation status
- Least Concern (IUCN 3.1)

Scientific classification
- Kingdom: Animalia
- Phylum: Chordata
- Class: Actinopterygii
- Order: Characiformes
- Family: Alestidae
- Genus: Brachyalestes
- Species: B. imberi

Binomial name
- Brachyalestes imberi Peters, 1852

Synonyms
- Alestes bequaerti Boulenger, 1920; Alestes curtus Boulenger, 1920; Alestes fuchsii Boulenger, 1899; Alestes imberi Peters, 1852; Alestes lemairii Boulenger, 1899; Brycinus imberi (Peters, 1852)

= Brachyalestes imberi =

Species of fish

Brachyalestes imberi is a species of freshwater fish in the African tetra family (Alestidae) of order Characiformes. It is found in lakes and rivers across much of sub-Saharan Africa. It grows to a maximum size of 19.8 centimetres (7.8 in) in total length and 300 grams (11 oz).

== Taxonomy ==
Brachyalestes imberi was first described by Wilhelm Peters in 1852 under the basionym Alestes imberi. The species has also been referred to by the synonyms Alestes bequaerti, Alestes curtus, Alestes fuchsii, Alestes lemairii, and Brycinus imberi. It is classified in the Alestidae family (the African tetras) in the order Characiformes. It is also known by the common names spot-tail robber, spot-tailed robber, spot-tail, characin, imberi, and silversides.

Five syntypes serve as the type specimens of the species and are housed at the Natural History Museum, London: BMNH 1861.3.10.1-2, collected from the Zambezi in Mozambique; BMNH 1901.12.21.25-26, collected from the Upper Congo River in the Democratic Republic of the Congo (DRC); BMNH 1899.11.27.97, collected from Lake Mweru in the DRC; BMNH 1899.9.26.94, collected from Lake Leopold II in Kutu, DRC; and BMNH 1896.3.9.22-3, collected from the Congo River in the DRC.

== Distribution and habitat ==
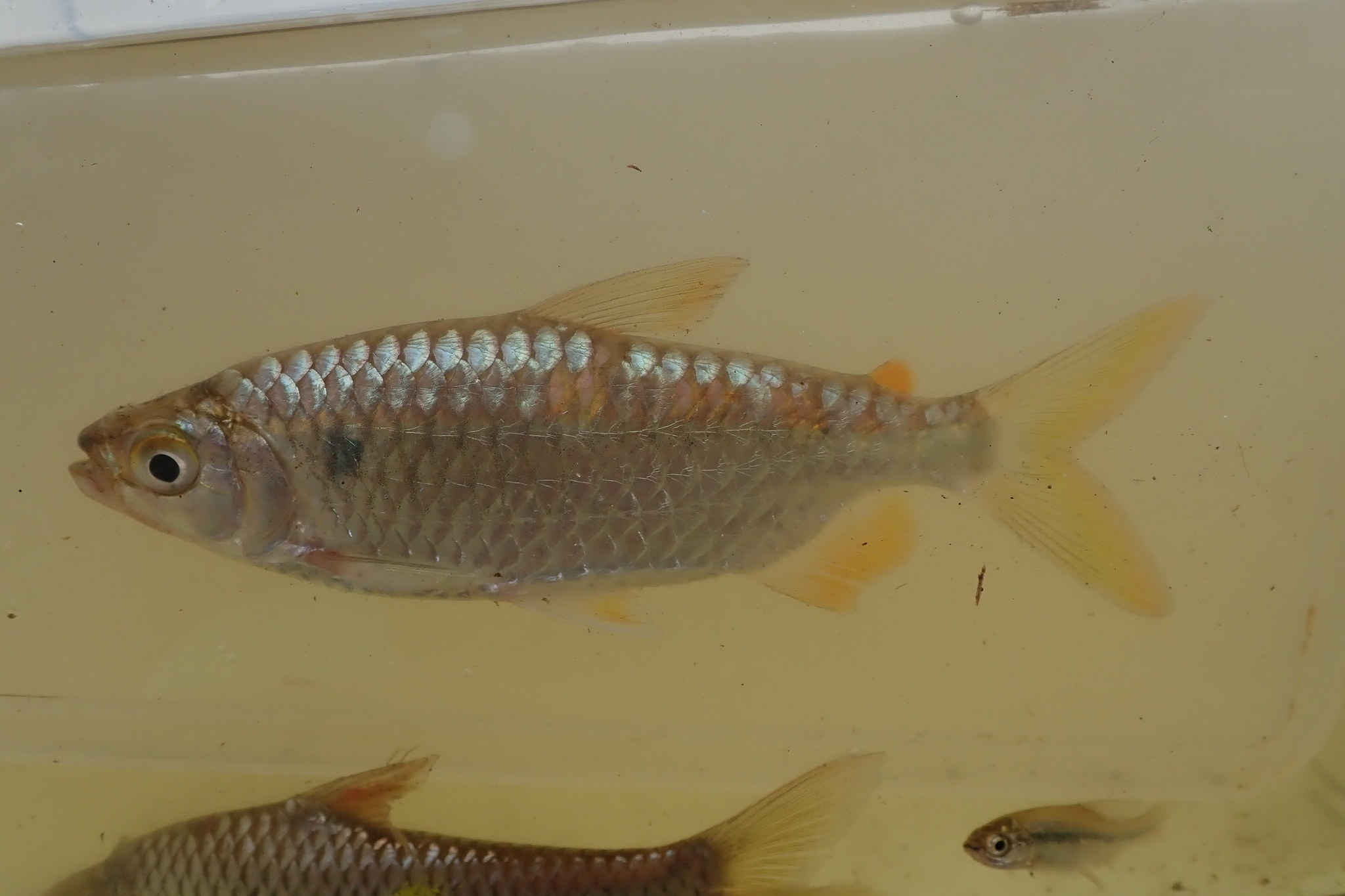
Brachyalestes imberi

Brachyalestes imberi is widely distributed in West, East, and Southern Africa. It can be found in the nations of Angola, Benin, Botswana, Burkina Faso, Burundi, Cameroon, the Central African Republic, the Republic of the Congo, the Democratic Republic of the Congo, Côte d'Ivoire, Eswatini, Ghana, Guinea, Liberia, Malawi, Mozambique, South Africa, Tanzania, Togo, Zambia, and Zimbabwe. It inhabits bodies of water including Lake Malawi, Lake Chilwa, Lake Chiuta, Lake Rukwa, Lake Kariba, and the Shire, Mono, Nipoué, Malagarasi, Rusizi, Phongolo, Limpopo, Rufiji, Ruvuma, Wami, Quanza, Nyanga, Cunene, and middle and lower Zambezi rivers, as well as throughout the Congo Basin.

Brachyalestes imberi inhabits shallow waters in swampy bays of lakes and rivers with a pH of 6.0–6.5. A demersal fish, it lives near the bottom of the water column. It prefers rocky or sandy substrates.

== Description ==
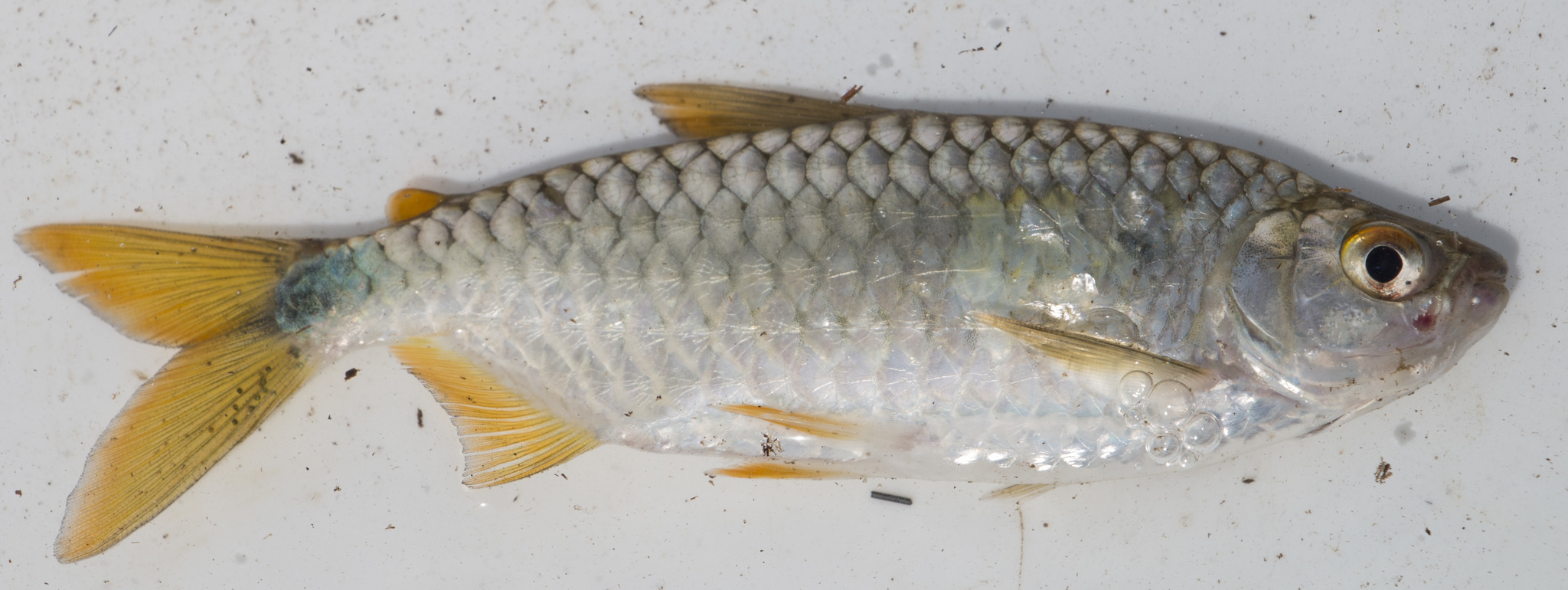
Brachyalestes imberi

Brachyalestes imberi has a fusiform body with cycloid scales. It is silver in colouration, though darker on the back and lighter on the belly. It has a black humeral spot and a black spot at the base of the caudal fin that may extend into the fin's rays. The colour of the fins varies by locality but can be yellow, red, black, or brown. The premaxilla has two rows of eight teeth each. There are 21–31 scales on the lateral line, 4.5 scales above the lateral line, and 3.5 scales below it. The anal fin has 14–18 rays, and the fish has 16–20 gill rakers. It reaches up to 19.8 cm (7.8 in) in total length and 300 g (11 oz).

== Biology and ecology ==
Brachyalestes imberi feeds on insects, fishes, crustaceans, and vegetation. It is preyed upon by tigerfish. During the summer rainy season, it migrates to floodplains to spawn. Its lifespan is up to five years.

== Conservation ==
Brachyalestes imberi is assessed as a least concern species on the IUCN Red List due to its wide range and a lack of major threats to its population. Its population has declined in some parts of its distribution, including in South Africa and Lake Rukwa, due to habitat loss.

This species is taken by subsistence fishermen and is used in the aquarium industry. It is also used as live bait when angling for larger fish.
