= Alestopetersius compressus =

Conservation status
- Least Concern (IUCN 3.1)

Scientific classification
- Kingdom: Animalia
- Phylum: Chordata
- Class: Actinopterygii
- Order: Characiformes
- Family: Alestidae
- Genus: Alestopetersius
- Species: A. compressus

Binomial name
- Alestopetersius compressus (Poll & J. P. Gosse, 1963)

Synonyms
- Petersius compressus Poll & Gosse, 1963; Phenacogrammus compressus (Poll & Gosse, 1963)

Species of fish

Alestopetersius compressus is a species of freshwater ray-finned fish belonging to the family Alestidae, the African tetras. It is found in the middle Congo River basin, in the Democratic Republic of the Congo.

== Description ==
Alestopetersius compressus reaches a standard length of 7.8 cm (3.1 in).
