= Large-toothed Lake Turkana robber =

Conservation status
- Vulnerable (IUCN 3.1)

Scientific classification
- Kingdom: Animalia
- Phylum: Chordata
- Class: Actinopterygii
- Order: Characiformes
- Family: Alestidae
- Genus: Brachyalestes
- Species: B. ferox

Binomial name
- Brachyalestes ferox (A. J. Hopson & J. Hopson, 1982)

Synonyms
- Alestes ferox A. J. Hopson & J. Hopson, 1982; Brycinus ferox (A. J. Hopson & J. Hopson, 1982)

Species of fish

The large-toothed Lake Turkana robber (Brachyalestes ferox) is a species of freshwater ray-finned fish belonging to the family Alestidae, the African tetras. It is endemic to Lake Turkana in Kenya. In 2023 its conservation status was changed from Least Concern to Vulnerable. It faces extinction due to overfishing, degradation of its natural habitat and the reduction of fresh freshwater due to the building of dams.
