= Alestopetersius taeniatus =

Conservation status
- Data Deficient (IUCN 3.1)

Scientific classification
- Kingdom: Animalia
- Phylum: Chordata
- Class: Actinopterygii
- Order: Characiformes
- Family: Alestidae
- Genus: Alestopetersius
- Species: A. taeniatus

Binomial name
- Alestopetersius taeniatus (Géry, 1996)

Synonyms
- Phenacogrammus taeniatus Géry, 1996

Species of fish

Alestopetersius taeniatus is a species of freshwater ray-finned fish belonging to the family Alestidae, the African tetras. It is known only from the Sangha River in Cameroon.

== Description ==
Alestopetersius taeniatus reaches a standard length of 4.0 cm (1.6 in).
