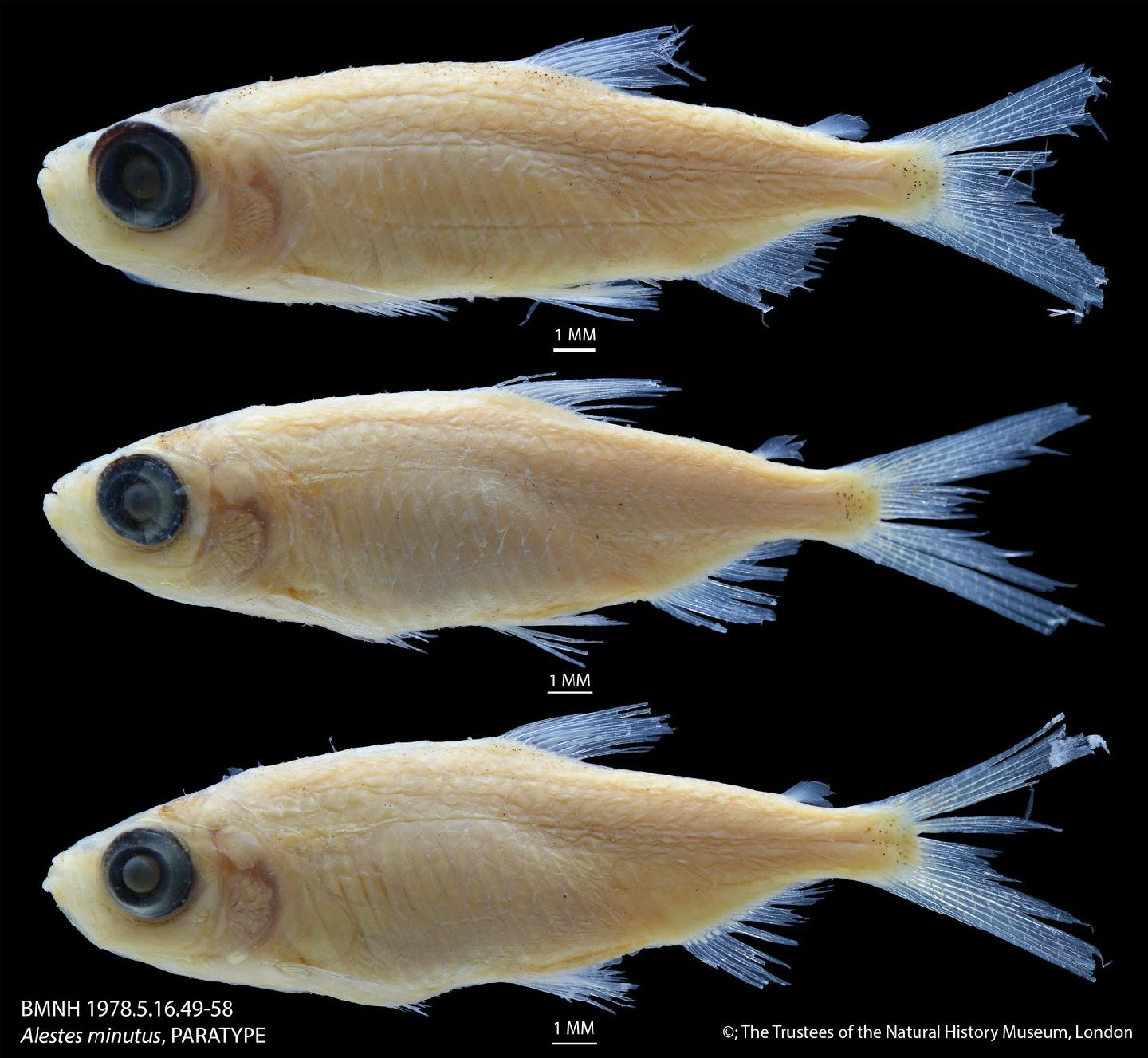

Conservation status
- Vulnerable (IUCN 3.1)

Scientific classification
- Kingdom: Animalia
- Phylum: Chordata
- Class: Actinopterygii
- Order: Characiformes
- Family: Alestidae
- Genus: Brachyalestes
- Species: B. minutus

Binomial name
- Brachyalestes minutus (A. J. Hopson & J. Hopson, 1982)

Synonyms
- Alestes minutus A. J. Hopson & J. Hopson, 1982; Brycinus minutus (A. J. Hopson & J. Hopson, 1982)

= Dwarf Lake Turkana robber =

Species of fish

The dwarf Lake Turkana robber (Brachyalestes minutus) is a species of freshwater ray-finned fish belonging to the family Alestidae, the African tetras. It is endemic to Lake Turkana in Kenya.
