= Alestopetersius tumbensis =

Conservation status
- Least Concern (IUCN 3.1)

Scientific classification
- Kingdom: Animalia
- Phylum: Chordata
- Class: Actinopterygii
- Order: Characiformes
- Family: Alestidae
- Genus: Alestopetersius
- Species: A. tumbensis

Binomial name
- Alestopetersius tumbensis Hoedeman, 1951

Synonyms
- Alestopetersius xenurus tumbensis Hoedeman, 1951; Duboisialestes tumbensis (Hoedeman, 1951)

Species of fish

Alestopetersius tumbensis is a species of freshwater ray-finned fish belonging to the family Alestidae, the African tetras. It is found in the Malebo Pool, the Kwenge River of the Kwilu River drainage and Lake Tumba in the Democratic Republic of the Congo.

== Description ==
Alestopetersius tumbensis reaches a standard length of 4.3 cm (1.7 in).
