= Hemigrammopetersius major =

Conservation status
- Least Concern (IUCN 3.1)

Scientific classification
- Kingdom: Animalia
- Phylum: Chordata
- Class: Actinopterygii
- Order: Characiformes
- Family: Alestidae
- Genus: Hemigrammopetersius
- Species: H. major

Binomial name
- Hemigrammopetersius major (Boulenger, 1903)

Synonyms
- Petersius major Boulenger, 1903; Phenacogrammus major (Boulenger 1903)

Species of fish

Hemigrammopetersius major is a species of freshwater ray-finned fish belonging to the family Alestidae, the African tetras. It is found in the Dja River, of the Sangha drainage, of the middle Congo River basin, and in the Nyong, Ntem and Sanaga river basins in Cameroon.

== Description ==
Hemigrammopetersius major reaches a standard length of 9.5 cm (3.7 in).
