= Alestopetersius nigropterus =

Conservation status
- Endangered (IUCN 3.1)

Scientific classification
- Kingdom: Animalia
- Phylum: Chordata
- Class: Actinopterygii
- Order: Characiformes
- Family: Alestidae
- Genus: Alestopetersius
- Species: A. nigropterus

Binomial name
- Alestopetersius nigropterus Poll, 1967

Synonyms
- Phenacogrammus nigropterus (Poll, 1967)

Species of fish

Alestopetersius nigropterus is a species of freshwater ray-finned fish belonging to the family Alestidae, the African tetras. This fish is found in Lake Mai-Ndombe in the middle Congo River basin in the Democratic Republic of the Congo.

== Description ==
Alestopetersius nigropterus reaches a standard length of 6.5 cm (2.6 in).
