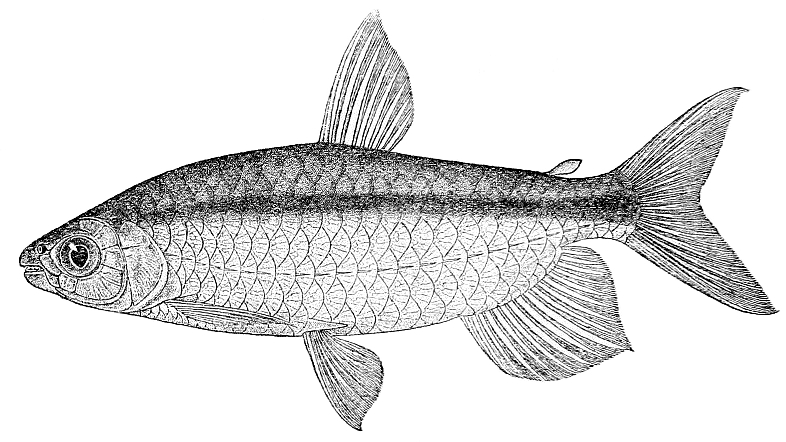

Conservation status
- Least Concern (IUCN 3.1)

Scientific classification
- Kingdom: Animalia
- Phylum: Chordata
- Class: Actinopterygii
- Order: Characiformes
- Family: Alestidae
- Genus: Brycinus
- Species: B. jacksonii

Binomial name
- Brycinus jacksonii (Boulenger, 1912)

Synonyms
- Alestes jacksonii Boulenger, 1912; Brycinus jacksonii (Boulenger, 1912)

= Victoria robber =

Species of fish

The Victoria robber (Brachyalestes jacksonii) is a species of freshwater ray-finned fish belonging to the family Alestidae, the African tetras. It is found in Kenya, Rwanda, Tanzania and Uganda. It occurs in Lake Victoria and some surrounding streams.
