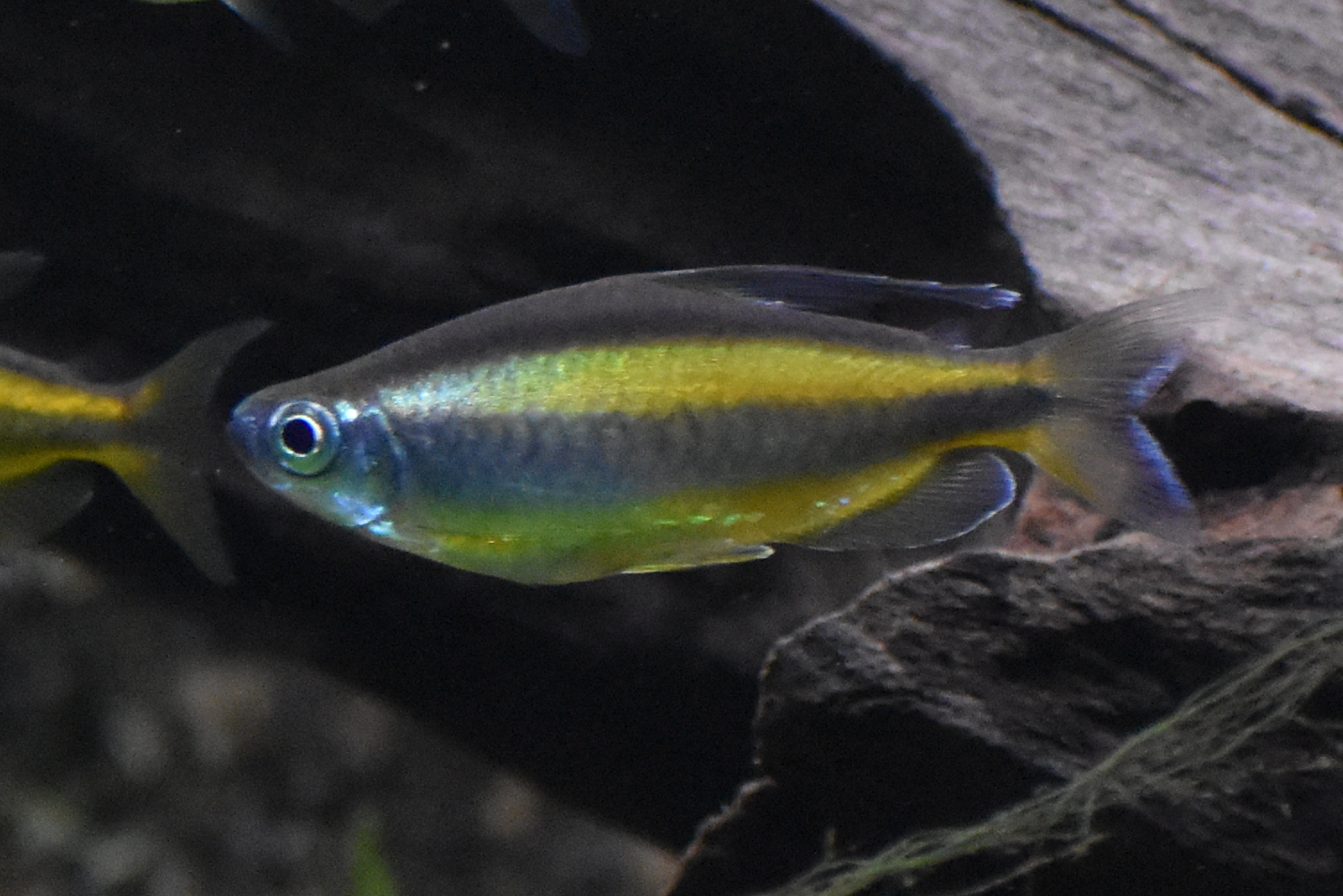

Conservation status
- Least Concern (IUCN 3.1)

Scientific classification
- Kingdom: Animalia
- Phylum: Chordata
- Class: Actinopterygii
- Order: Characiformes
- Family: Alestidae
- Genus: Phenacogrammus
- Species: P. aurantiacus

Binomial name
- Phenacogrammus aurantiacus (Pellegrin, 1930))

Synonyms
- Hemigrammopetersius aurantiacus Pellegrin, 1930; Hemigrammopetersius trilobatus Pellegrin, 1931; Phenacogrammus heterodontus Poll, 1945

= Phenacogrammus aurantiacus =

Species of freshwater fish

Phenacogrammus aurantiacus is a species of freshwater ray-finned fish belonging to the family Alestidae, the African tetras. This species is found in Western Central Africa

== Distribution and habitat ==
Phenacogrammus aurantiacus is found in central Africa, within the Kouilou basin of the Republic of the Congo (RotC), and the Ogooué basin, which lies in both Gabon and the RotC. The species also inhabits the middle and upper reaches of the Congo River and associated waterbodies of the Congo Basin. The two Congo countries—RotC and DR Congo—both encompass parts of the Congo river and basin.

== Description ==
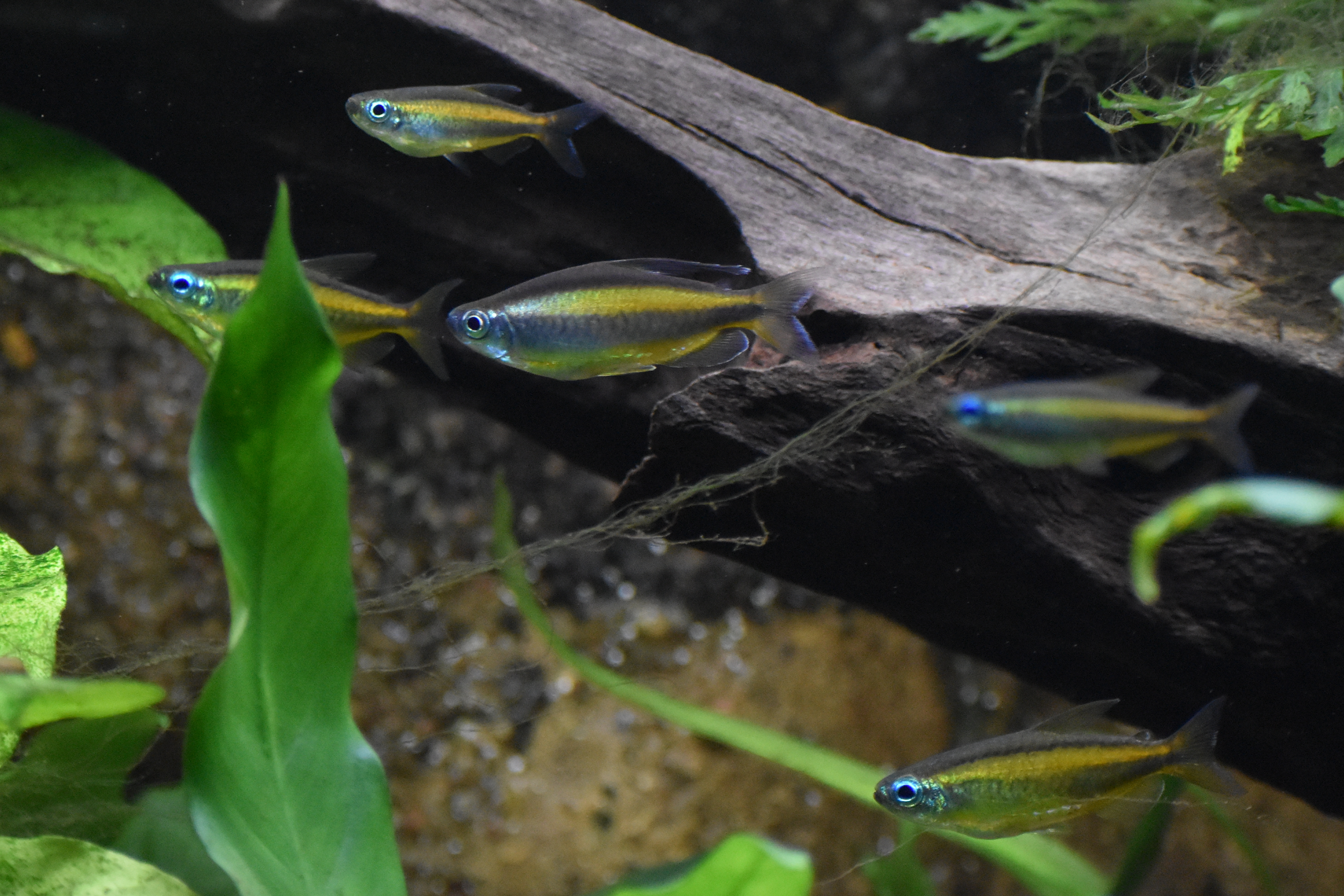
At Aquarium de la Porte Dorée

Individuals of the species may reach a total length of 10.0 cm (3.9 in). The fish has silvery sides with a central broad dark band that starts just behind the gills and runs to the caudal fin. The colour of the band varies greatly in intensity between individuals of the species.
