= Alestopetersius smykalai =

Conservation status
- Endangered (IUCN 3.1)

Scientific classification
- Kingdom: Animalia
- Phylum: Chordata
- Class: Actinopterygii
- Order: Characiformes
- Family: Alestidae
- Genus: Alestopetersius
- Species: A. smykalai

Binomial name
- Alestopetersius smykalai Poll, 1967

Synonyms
- Rhabdalestes smykalai (Poll, 1967)

Species of fish

Alestopetersius smykalai is a species of freshwater ray-finned fish belonging to the family Alestidae, the African tetras. It is found in the lower Niger River.

== Description ==
Alestopetersius smykalai reaches a total length of 6.0 cm (2.4 in).

== Etymology ==
The tetra is named in honor of E. R. Smykala, who procured the original specimen.
