= Hemigrammopetersius =

Scientific classification
- Kingdom: Animalia
- Phylum: Chordata
- Class: Actinopterygii
- Order: Characiformes
- Family: Alestidae
- Genus: Hemigrammopetersius; Pellegrin, 1926

Type species
- Petersius pulcher Boulenger, 1909

Synonyms
- Hemigrammalestes Pellegrin, 1926

Genus of fishes

Hemigrammopetersius is a genus of ray-finned fish in the family Alestiidae, the African tetras. The fishes in this genus are found in West Central Africa.

== Species ==
Hemigrammopetersius contains the following valid species:

- Hemigrammopetersius barnardi (Herre, 1936) (Barnard's robber)
- Hemigrammopetersius major (Boulenger, 1903)
- Hemigrammopetersius pulcher (Boulenger, 1909)
- Hemigrammopetersius urotaenia (Boulenger, 1909)
