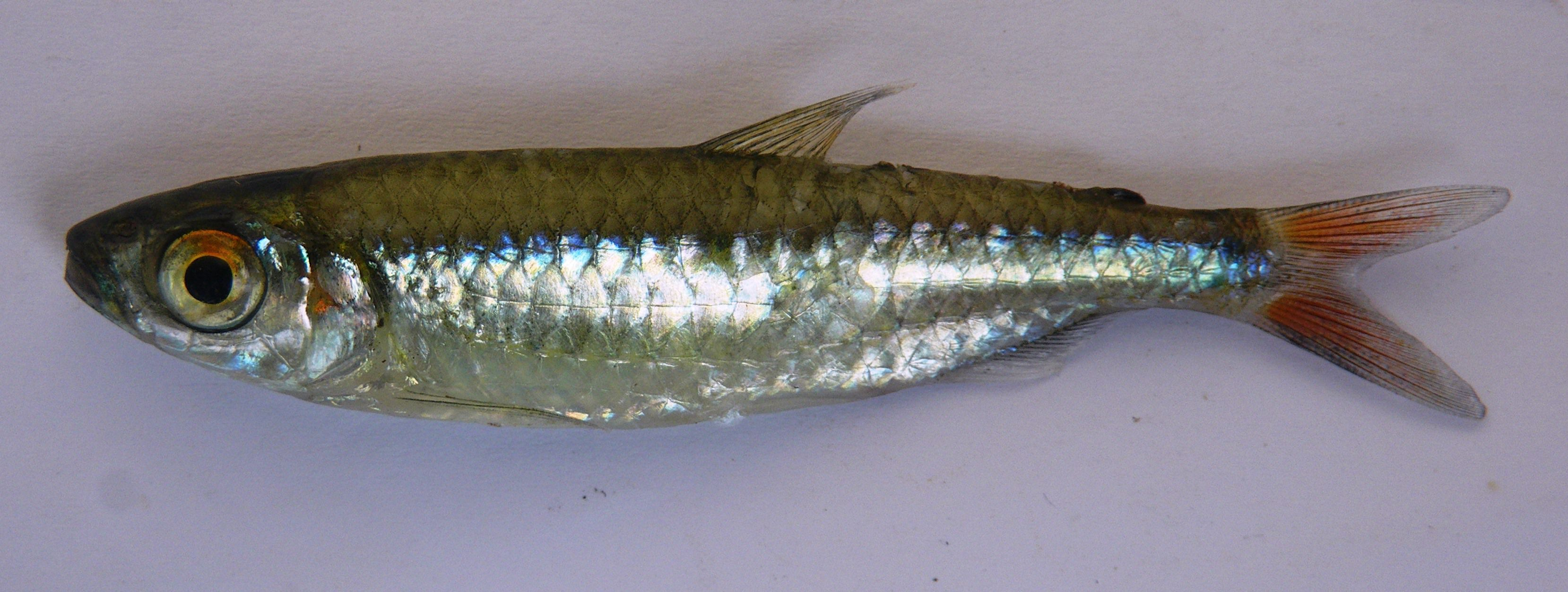
- Micralestes sardina collected in the Lukulu river, Lavushi Manda National Park, Zambia

Scientific classification
- Kingdom: Animalia
- Phylum: Chordata
- Class: Actinopterygii
- Order: Characiformes
- Family: Alestidae
- Genus: Micralestes; Boulenger, 1899

Type species
- Micralestes humilis Boulenger, 1899

Synonyms
- Virilia Roberts, 1967

= Micralestes =

Genus of fishes

Micralestes is a genus of freshwater ray-finned fishes belonging to the family Alestidae, the African tetras. These fishes are found in Sub-Saharan Africa.

== Species ==
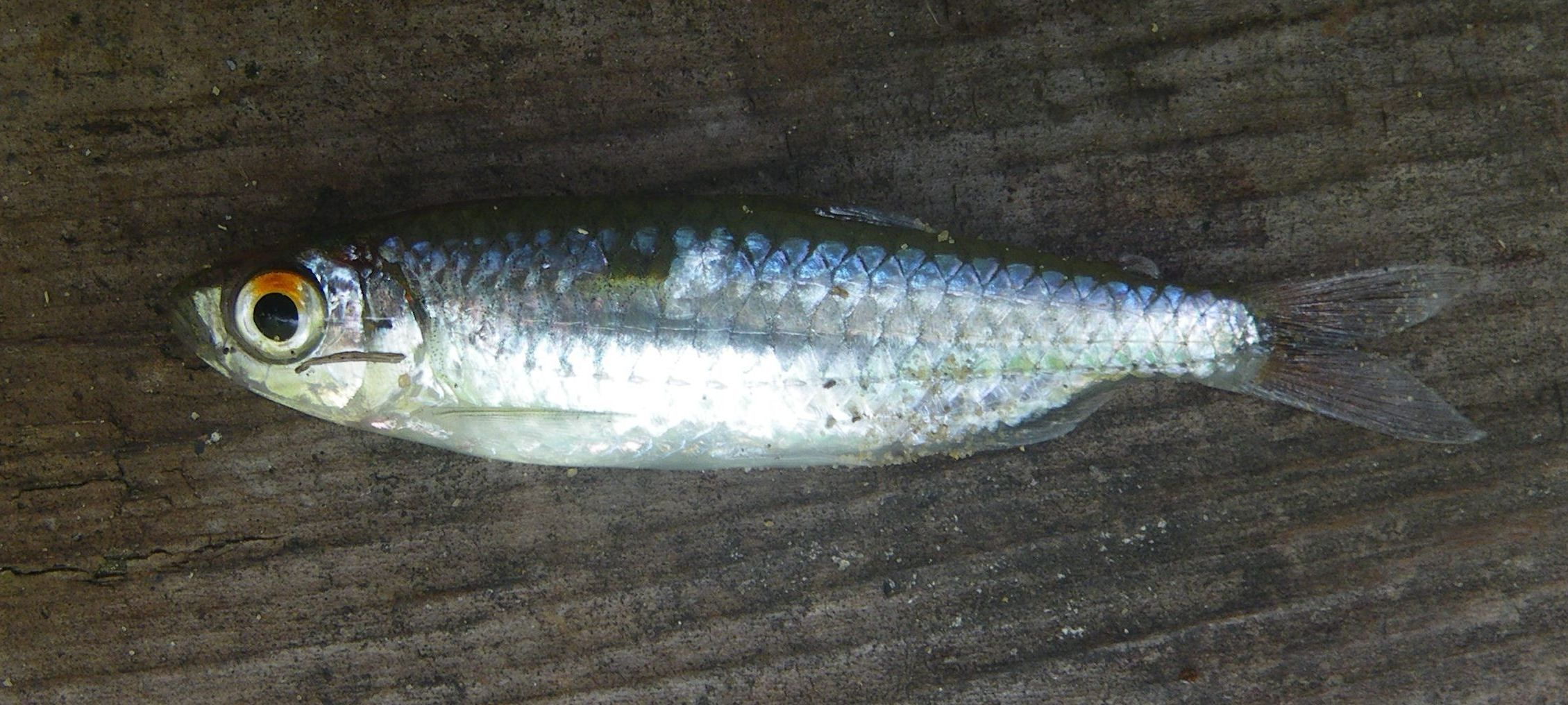
Micralestes humilis collected in the Lukulu river, Lavushi Manda National Park, Zambia by the South African Institute for Aquatic Biodiversity

Micralestes contains the following species:

- Micralestes acutidens (W. K. H. Peters, 1852) (Sharptooth tetra)
- Micralestes ambiguus Géry, 1995
- Micralestes argyrotaenia Trewavas, 1936
- Micralestes comoensis Poll & Román, 1967
- Micralestes congicus Poll, 1967
- Micralestes eburneensis Daget, 1965
- Micralestes elongatus [Daget, 1957 (Elongated Turkana robber)
- Micralestes fodori Matthes, 1965
- Micralestes holargyreus (Günther, 1873)
- Micralestes humilis Boulenger, 1899
- Micralestes lualabae Poll, 1967
- Micralestes occidentalis (Günther, 1899)
- Micralestes pabrensis (Román, 1966)
- Micralestes schelly Stiassny & Mamonekene, 2007
- Micralestes stormsi Boulenger, 1902
- Micralestes vittatus (Boulenger, 1917)
