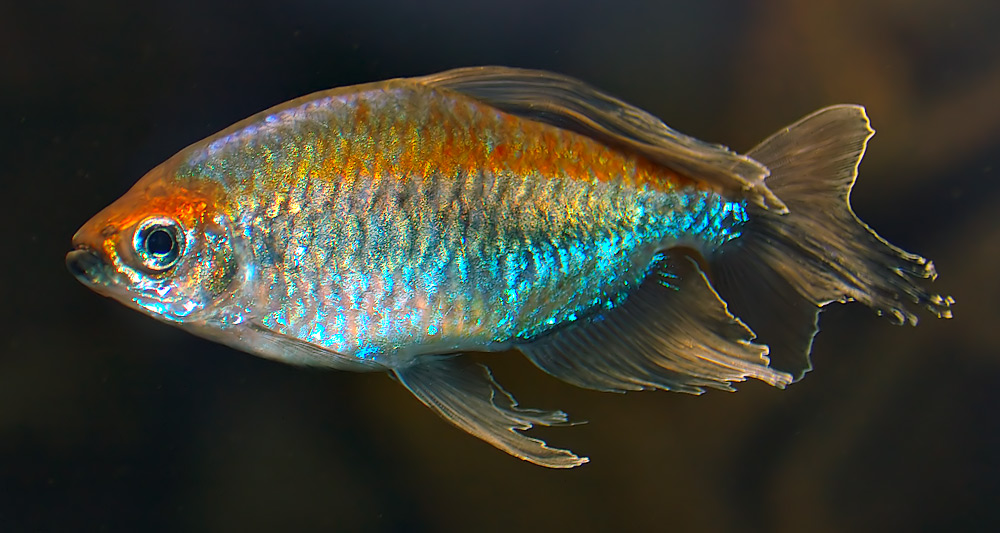
- Phenacogrammus interruptus

Scientific classification
- Kingdom: Animalia
- Phylum: Chordata
- Class: Actinopterygii
- Order: Characiformes
- Family: Alestidae
- Genus: Phenacogrammus; C. H. Eigenmann, 1907

Type species
- Micralestes interruptus Boulenger, 1899

= Phenacogrammus =

Genus of fishes

Phenacogrammus is a genus of freshwater ray-finned fishes belonging to the family Alestidae, the African tetras. These fishes are found in Western and Central Africa.

== Species ==
Phenacogrammus contains the following valid species:

- Phenacogrammus aurantiacus (Pellegrin, 1930)
- Phenacogrammus concolor Stiassny, Alter, Monsembula Iyaba & Liyandja, 2021
- Phenacogrammus deheyni Poll, 1945
- Phenacogrammus flexus Stiassny, Alter, Monsembula Iyaba & Liyandja, 2021
- Phenacogrammus interruptus (Boulenger, 1899) (Congo tetra)
- Phenacogrammus polli Lambert, 1961
- Phenacogrammus stigmatura (Fowler, 1936)
