= Alestion =

Scientific classification
- Kingdom: Animalia
- Phylum: Chordata
- Class: Actinopterygii
- Order: Characiformes
- Family: Alestidae
- Genus: Alestion; Roberts, 2019
- Species: A. rapax

Binomial name
- Alestion rapax Roberts, 2019

Monospecific genus of fish

Alestion is monospecific genus of freshwater ray-finned fish belonging to the family Alestidae, the African tetras. The only species in the genus is Alestion rapax. This fish is known only from the Kwilu River in the lower drainage basin of the Congo River in the Democratic Republic of Congo.
