= African moon tetra =

Conservation status
- Least Concern (IUCN 3.1)

Scientific classification
- Kingdom: Animalia
- Phylum: Chordata
- Class: Actinopterygii
- Order: Characiformes
- Family: Alestidae
- Genus: Bathyaethiops
- Species: B. caudomaculatus

Binomial name
- Bathyaethiops caudomaculatus (Pellegrin, 1925)

Synonyms
- Micralestes caudomaculatus Pellegrin, 1925

Species of fish

The African moon tetra (Bathyaethiops caudomaculatus), also known as the common moon tetra, is a species of freshwater ray-finned fish belonging to the family Alestidae, the African tetras. This fish is found in slow flowing rivers of the middle and lower course of the Congo River. The fish is often kept in aquaria but little is known about is its distribution and habits.

== Appearance ==
The African moon tetra measures around 8 cm (3.1 in) long, it is a relatively deep bodied fish with a general gold coloration, which is interrupted by a large black spot at the base of the caudal fin of the fish. There is also a small red spot visible under the dorsal fin, this is smaller in females (which are generally deeper bodied). The fish has typically large eyes and clear fins.

== Distribution ==
The African moon tetra is found in the central and lower Congo River basin where it inhabits densely vegetated streams and backwaters.

== Habits ==
The African moon tetra is a shoaling fish which is often found around underwater structures or below floating plants. B. caudomaculatus is omnivorous feeding on small aquatic insects as well as plant matter.

== Aquarium ==
The African moon tetra is occasionally kept in aquariums. The species does well when kept in large groups

Bathyaethiops breuseghemi is occasionally misidentified as B. caudomaculatus in the aquarium trade.
