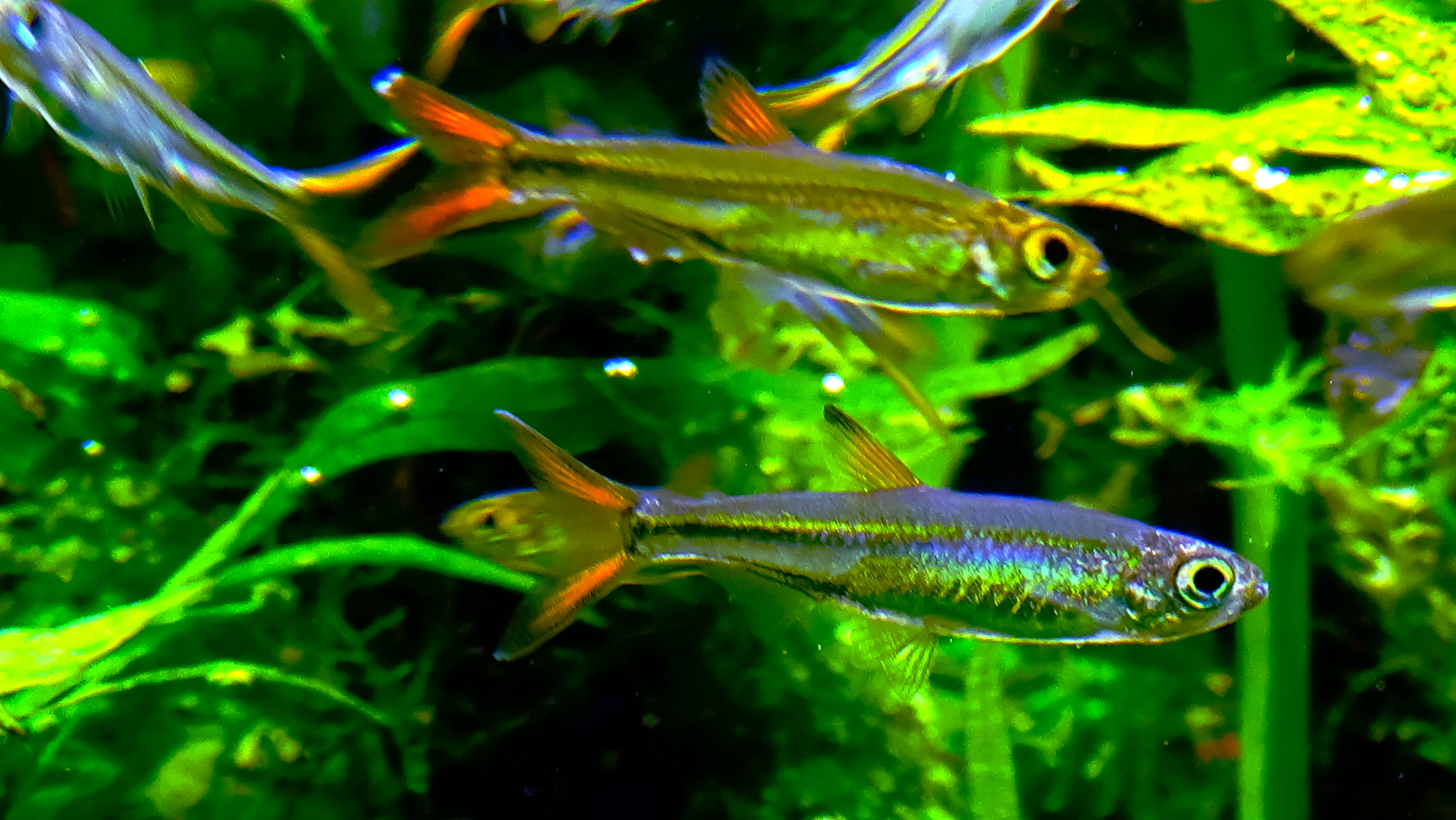
- A group of Ladigesia roloffi in captivity.

Conservation status
- Critically Endangered (IUCN 3.1)

Scientific classification
- Kingdom: Animalia
- Phylum: Chordata
- Class: Actinopterygii
- Division: Teleostei
- Order: Characiformes
- Family: Alestidae
- Genus: Ladigesia; Géry, 1968
- Species: L. roloffi

Binomial name
- Ladigesia roloffi Géry, 1968

= Ladigesia =

Monospecific genus of fish

Ladigesia is monospecific genus of freshwater ray-finned fish belonging to the family Alestidae, the African tetras. The only species in the genus is Ladigesia roloffi, the Sierra Leone dwarf characin, is a species that is found in Sierra Leone and Liberia, Africa. The fish was named in honor of German aquarist Erhard Roloff (1903–1980), who collected the type specimen. They are a social species generally living in schools at mid depths and surface level fresh water. It lives for five years. Ninety-seven percent of their natural habitat has been lost.

== Description ==
This species measures a length of 3 to 4 centimetres (1.2 to 1.6 in), making it a small fish species. Because of its small size, it is referred to as a "dwarf" animal. It has no anal spines, 16 to 17 anal soft rays and has an incomplete lateral line. It is an elongated fish.

== In aquarium ==
Ladigesia roloffi can be found as an aquarium fish under name jellybean tetra. They prefer soft, acidic water. They will take standard flake food. They are peaceful and lively fish. Their ideal temperature to live in is between 22 and 26 °C (72 and 79 °F).
