= Hemigrammopetersius urotaenia =

Conservation status
- Least Concern (IUCN 3.1)

Scientific classification
- Kingdom: Animalia
- Phylum: Chordata
- Class: Actinopterygii
- Order: Characiformes
- Family: Alestidae
- Genus: Hemigrammopetersius
- Species: H. urotaenia

Binomial name
- Hemigrammopetersius urotaenia (Boulenger, 1909)

Synonyms
- Micralestes urotaenia Boulenger, 1909; Phenacogrammus urotaenia (Boulenger 1909)

Species of fish

Hemigrammopetersius urotaenia is a species of freshwater ray-finned fish belonging to the family Alestidae, the African tetras. It is endemic to the Ntem and Ogowe River basins in Gabon and Cameroon.

== Description ==
Hemigrammopetersius urotaenia reaches a total length of 7.0 cm (2.8 in).
