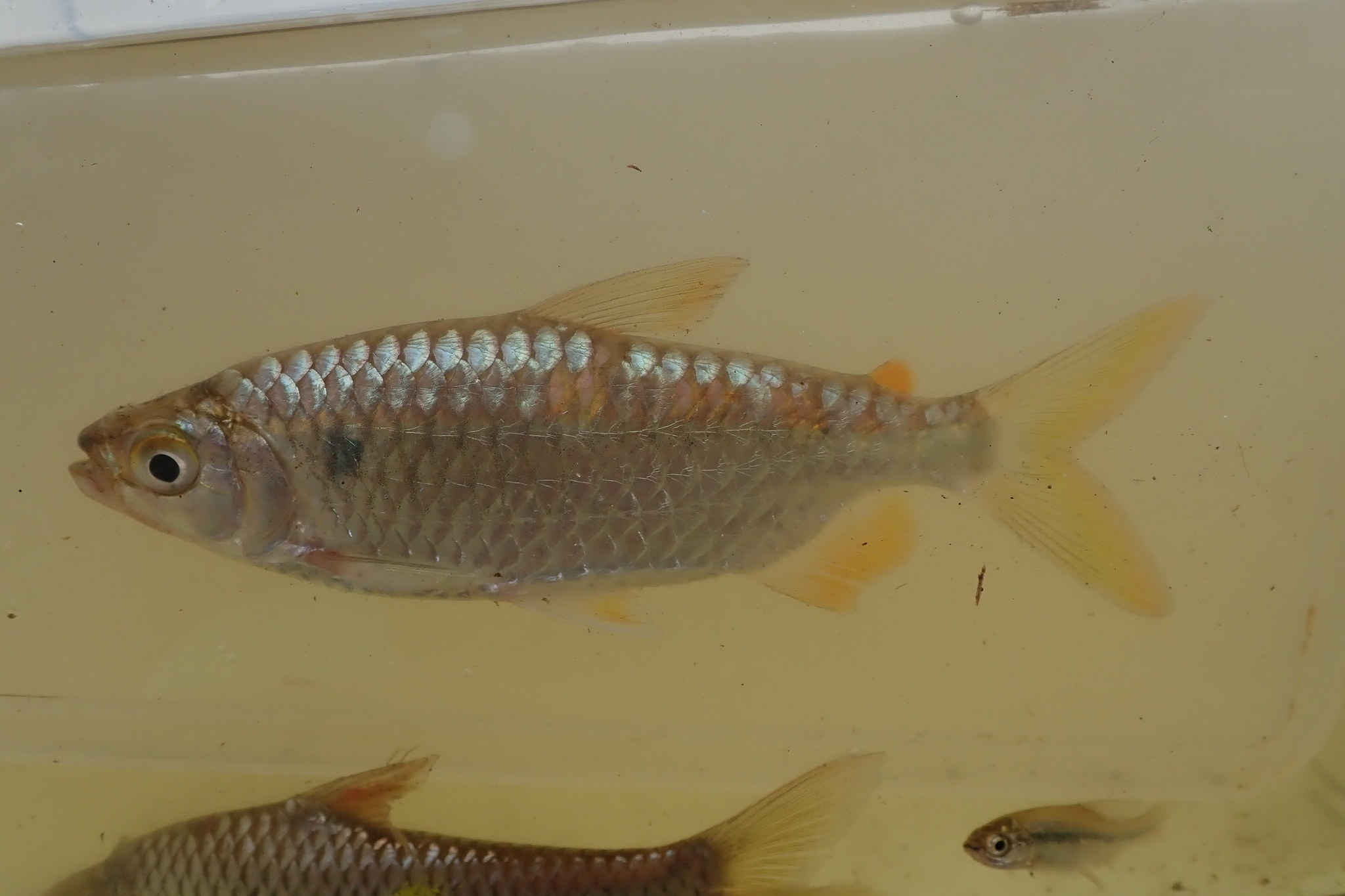
- Brachyalestes imberi

Scientific classification
- Kingdom: Animalia
- Phylum: Chordata
- Class: Actinopterygii
- Order: Characiformes
- Family: Alestidae
- Genus: Brachyalestes; Günther, 1864

Type species
- Myletes nurse Rüppell, 1832

Synonyms
- Alestogrammus Hoedeman, 1956

= Brachyalestes =

Genus of fishes

Brachyalestes is a genus of freshwater ray-finned fishes belonging to the family Alestidae, the African tetras. The fishes in this genus are found in Africa.

== Species ==
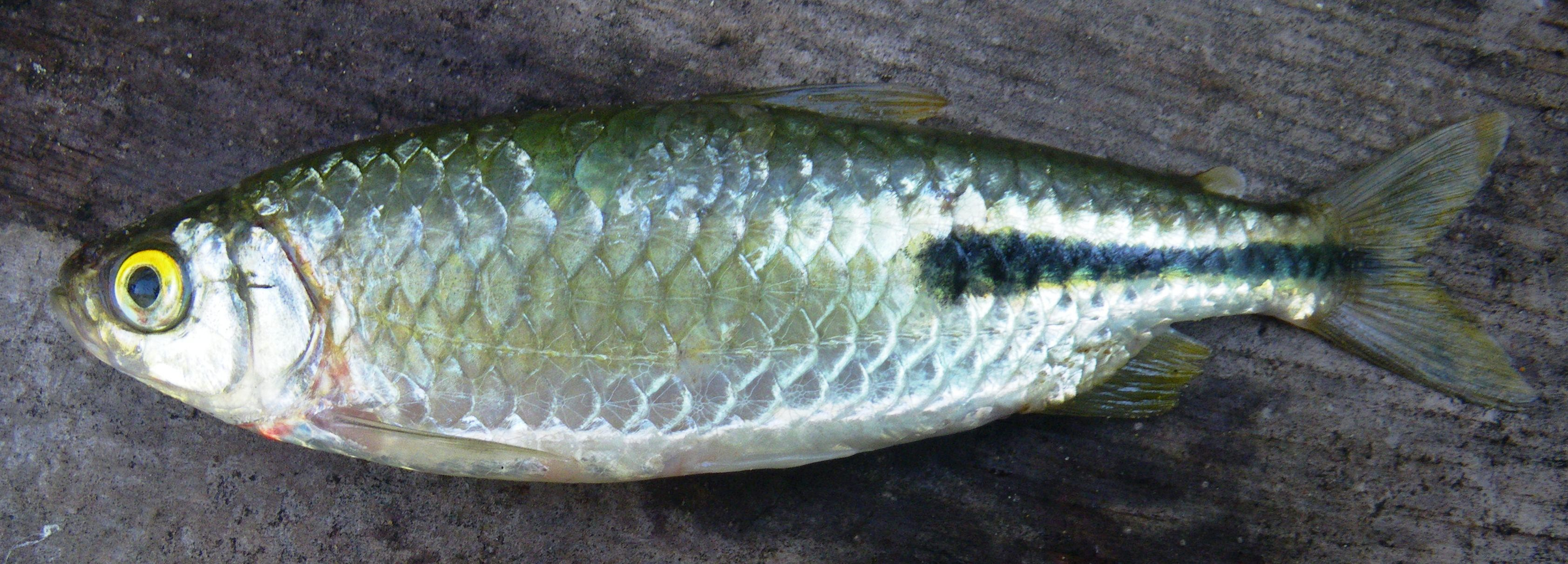
Brachyalestes peringueyi collected in Lavushi Manda National Park, Zambia, by the South African Institute for Aquatic Biodiversity

Brachyalestes contains the following valid species:

- Brachyalestes abeli (Fowler, 1936)
- Brachyalestes affinis (Günther, 1894)
- Brachyalestes bimaculatus (Boulenger, 1899)
- Brachyalestes carolinae (Paugy & Lévêque, 1981)
- Brachyalestes comptus (Roberts & Stewart, 1976)
- Brachyalestes epuluensis (Decru, Vreven, Sadio & Snoeks, 2016)
- Brachyalestes ferox (A. J. Hopson & J. Hopson, 1982)
- Brachyalestes fwaensis (Géry, 1995)
- Brachyalestes humilis (Boulenger, 1905)
- Brachyalestes imberi (Peters. 1852)
- Brachyalestes jackiae Stiassny & Melo, 2023
- Brachyalestes jacksonii (Boulenger, 1912)
- Brachyalestes kingsleyae (Günther, 1896)
- Brachyalestes lateralis (Boulenger, 1900)
- Brachyalestes minutus (Hopson & Hopson, 1982)
- Brachyalestes nurse (Rüppell, 1832)
- Brachyalestes nigricauda (Thys van den Audenaerde, 1974)
- Brachyalestes opisthotaenia (Boulenger, 1903)
- Brachyalestes peringueyi (Boulenger, 1923)
- Brachyalestes sadleri (Boulenger, 1906)
- Brachyalestes taeniurus (Günther, 1867)
