= Nannopetersius =

Scientific classification
- Kingdom: Animalia
- Phylum: Chordata
- Class: Actinopterygii
- Order: Characiformes
- Family: Alestidae
- Genus: Nannopetersius; Hoedeman, 1951

Type species
- Petersius ansorgii Boulenger, 1910

Genus of fishes

Nannopetersius is a genus of freshwater ray-finned fishes belonging to the family Alestidae, the African tetras. These fishes are found in West Central Africa.

== Species ==
Nannopetersius contains the following species:

- Nannopetersius ansorgii (Boulenger, 1910)
- Nannopetersius lamberti Poll, 1967
- Nannopetersius mutambuei Lunkayilakio & Vreven, 2008
