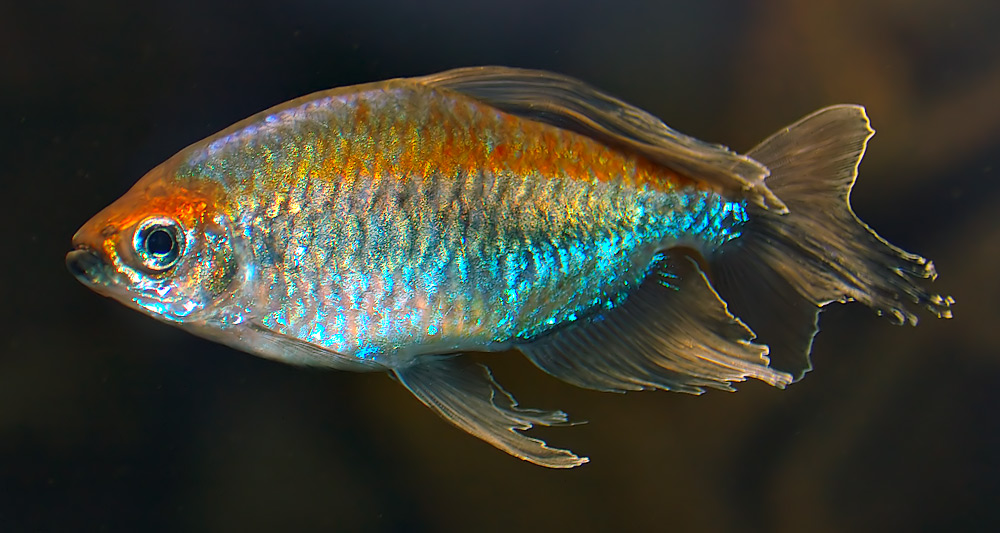
- Male
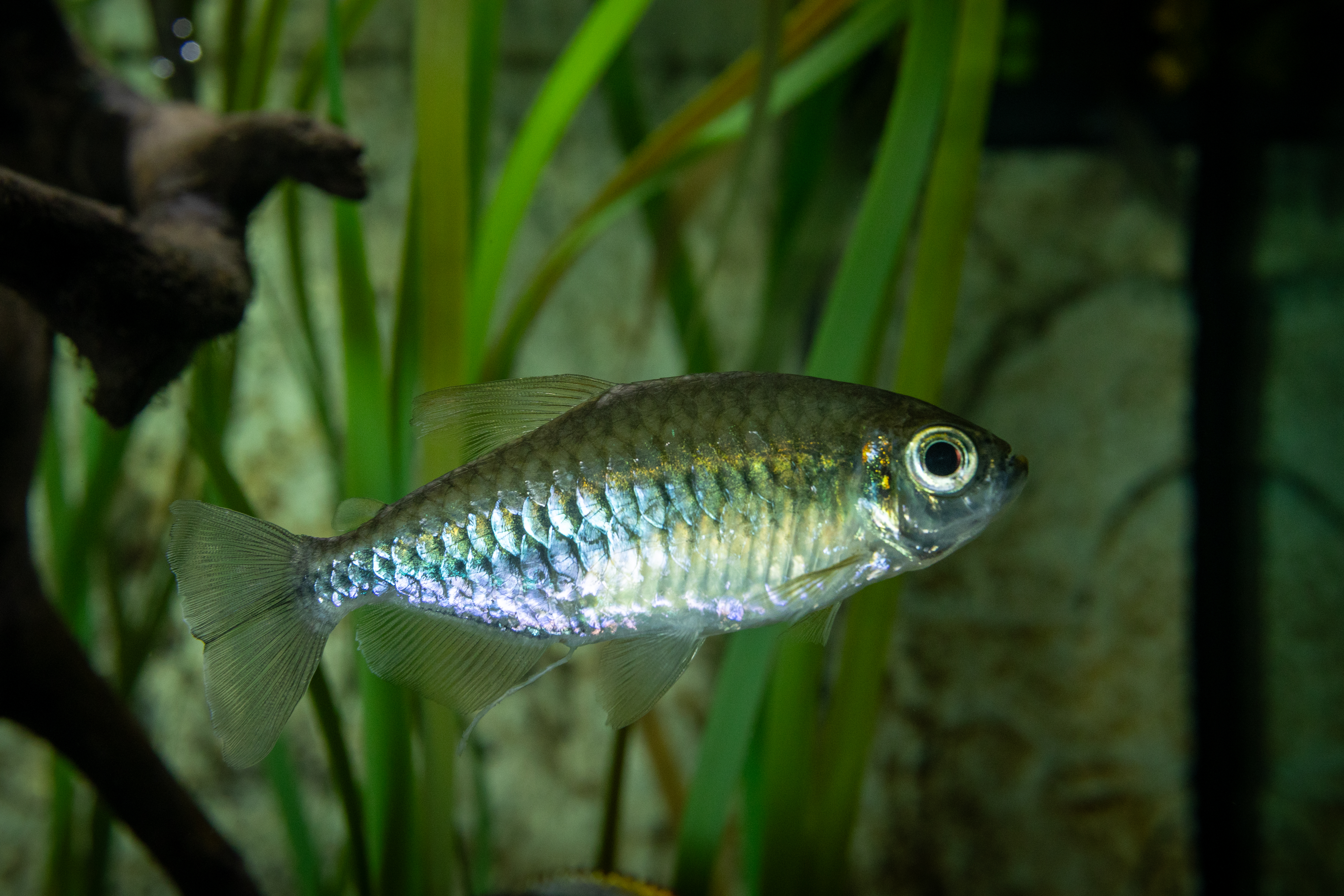
- Female

Conservation status
- Least Concern (IUCN 3.1)

Scientific classification
- Kingdom: Animalia
- Phylum: Chordata
- Class: Actinopterygii
- Order: Characiformes
- Family: Alestidae
- Genus: Phenacogrammus
- Species: P. interruptus

Binomial name
- Phenacogrammus interruptus (Boulenger, 1899)

= Congo tetra =

Species of fish

The Congo tetra (Phenacogrammus interruptus) is a species of fish in the African tetra family, found in the central Congo River Basin in Africa. It is commonly kept in aquaria.

== Description ==
The Congo tetra has a typical full-bodied tetra shape with rather large scales. When mature, the iridescent colors of the Congo tetra run through the fish from front to back, starting with blue on top changing to red through the middle, to yellow-gold, and back to blue just above the belly. It is not its fluorescent colors that make this tetra so distinct, but rather its tail fin, which develops into a grayish-violet feathery appendage with white edges. The males get up to 3.0 inches (7.6 cm). Females up to 2.75 inches (7.0 cm). The male is larger with more color, also the tail fin and dorsal fin are more extended. They also have different colors and extensions in the caudal fin.

== Aquarium trade and keeping ==
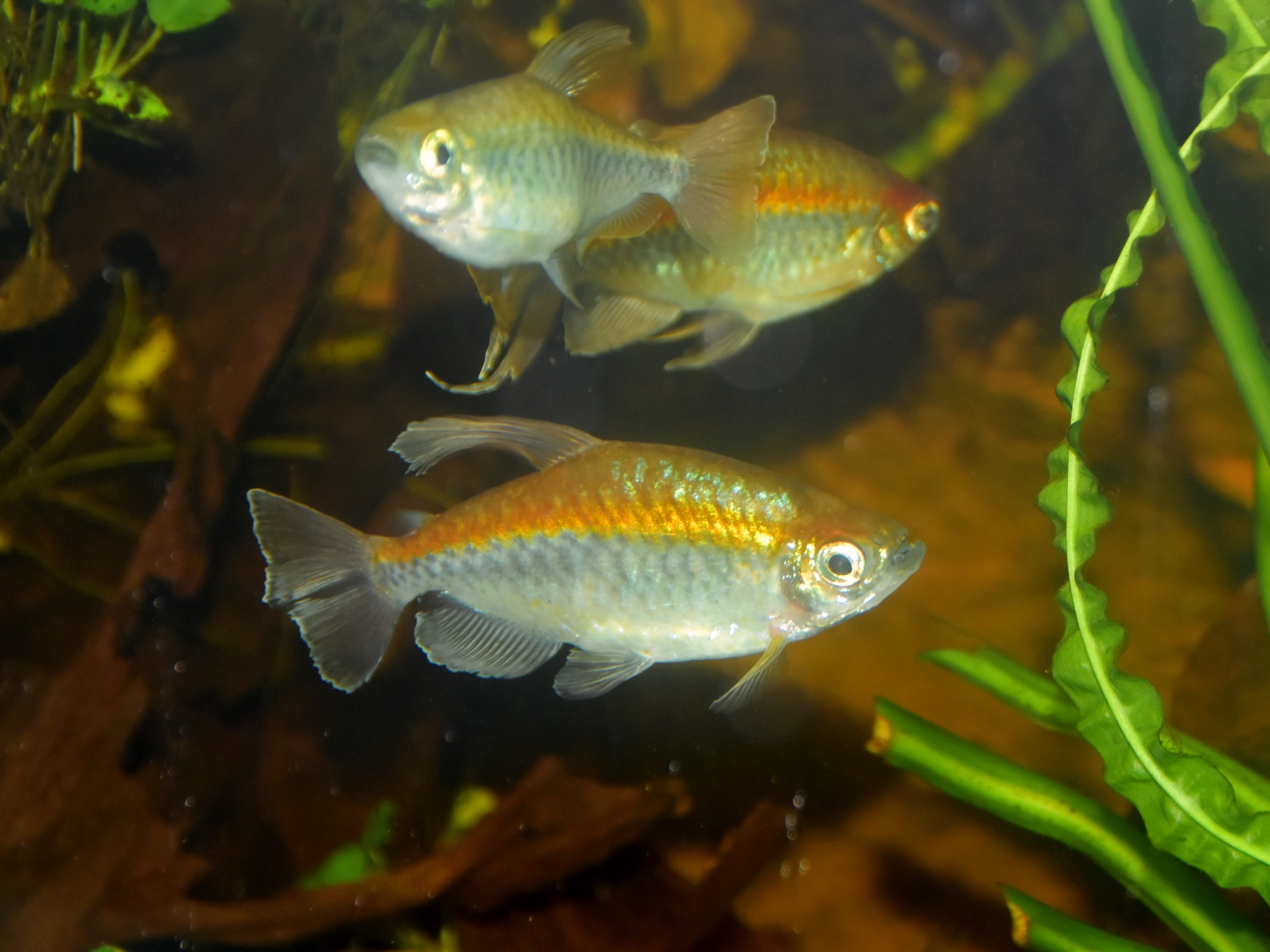
Congo tetras in aquarium

Congo tetra are a popular aquarium species.

== Breeding ==
Congo tetras are egg-scattering fish that exhibit no parental care. They are known to spawn in groups or in pairs, with breeding typically occurring in soft, slightly acidic to neutral water conditions (pH 6.0–7.5) with a temperature range of 75–80 °F (24–27 °C). A dimly lit environment and the presence of fine-leaved plants or a spawning mop are beneficial, as the species tends to scatter eggs among vegetation.

During courtship, males display intensified coloration and extended fin rays while performing a display to attract females. Once spawning occurs, the female releases several hundred adhesive eggs, which settle among the plants or substrate. The eggs typically hatch within 6 to 7 days, depending on water temperature, and the fry become free-swimming shortly thereafter.

Due to their tendency to consume their own eggs, it is common practice in controlled breeding conditions to separate the adult fish after spawning. The fry require microscopic food such as infusoria or liquid fry food initially, before transitioning to baby brine shrimp and finely crushed flake food as they grow. Growth is relatively fast under optimal conditions, with juveniles developing their characteristic iridescent colors and elongated fins as they mature.

Congo tetras reach sexual maturity at approximately 9 to 12 months of age. Successful breeding in home aquariums can be challenging, often requiring careful monitoring of water parameters and the use of a separate breeding tank to optimize survival rates.

== Conservation status ==
The IUCN lists the Congo tetra as a species of Least Concern.

== See also ==
- List of freshwater aquarium fish species

== Sources ==
- Ultrastructural Examination of Spermiogenesis and Spermatozoon Ultrastructure in Congo tetra Phenacogrammus interruptus Boulenger, 1899 (Ostariophysi: Characiformes: Alestidae)

Author: Pecio, Anna
Folia Biologica, Volume 57, Numbers 1–2, December 2008, pp. 13–21(9)
Publisher: Institute of Systematics and Evolution of Animals, Polish Academy of Sciences
