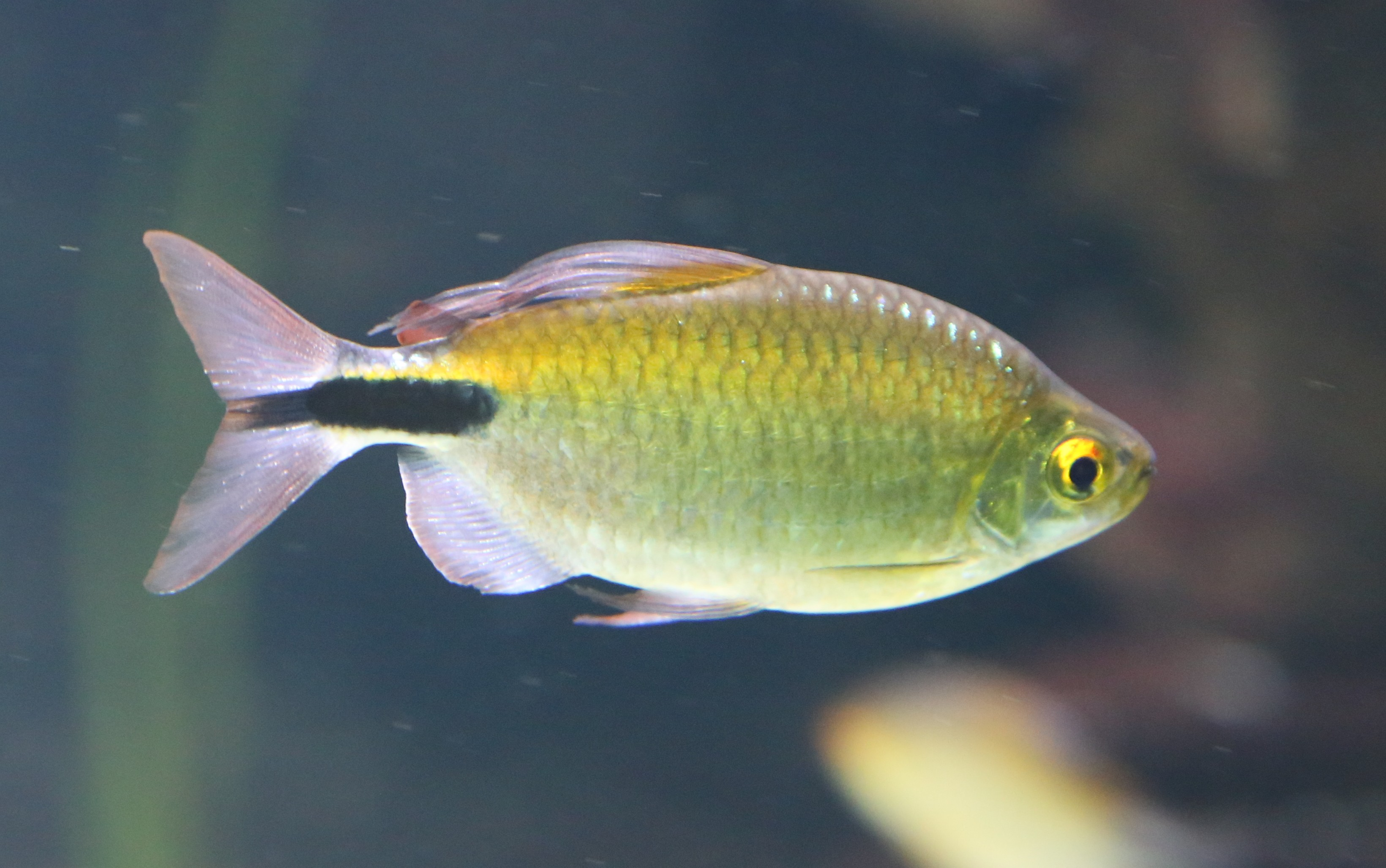
- Bryconalestes longipinnis

Scientific classification
- Kingdom: Animalia
- Phylum: Chordata
- Class: Actinopterygii
- Order: Characiformes
- Family: Alestidae
- Genus: Bryconalestes; Hoedeman, 1951

Type species
- Brachyalestes longipinnis Günther, 1864

Synonyms
- Alestobrycon Hoedeman, 1951

= Bryconalestes =

Genus of fishes

Bryconalestes is a genus of ray-finned fish in the family Alestiidae, the African tetras. The fishes in this genus are found in Western and Central Africa.

== Species ==
Bryconalestes contains the following species:

- Bryconalestes bartoni (Nichols & LaMonte, 1953)
- Bryconalestes derhami (Géry & Mahnert, 1977)
- Bryconalestes intermedius (Boulenger, 1903)
- Bryconalestes longipinnis (Günther, 1864)
- Bryconalestes tessmanni (Pappenheim, 1911)
- Bryconalestes tholloni (Pellegrin, 1901)
