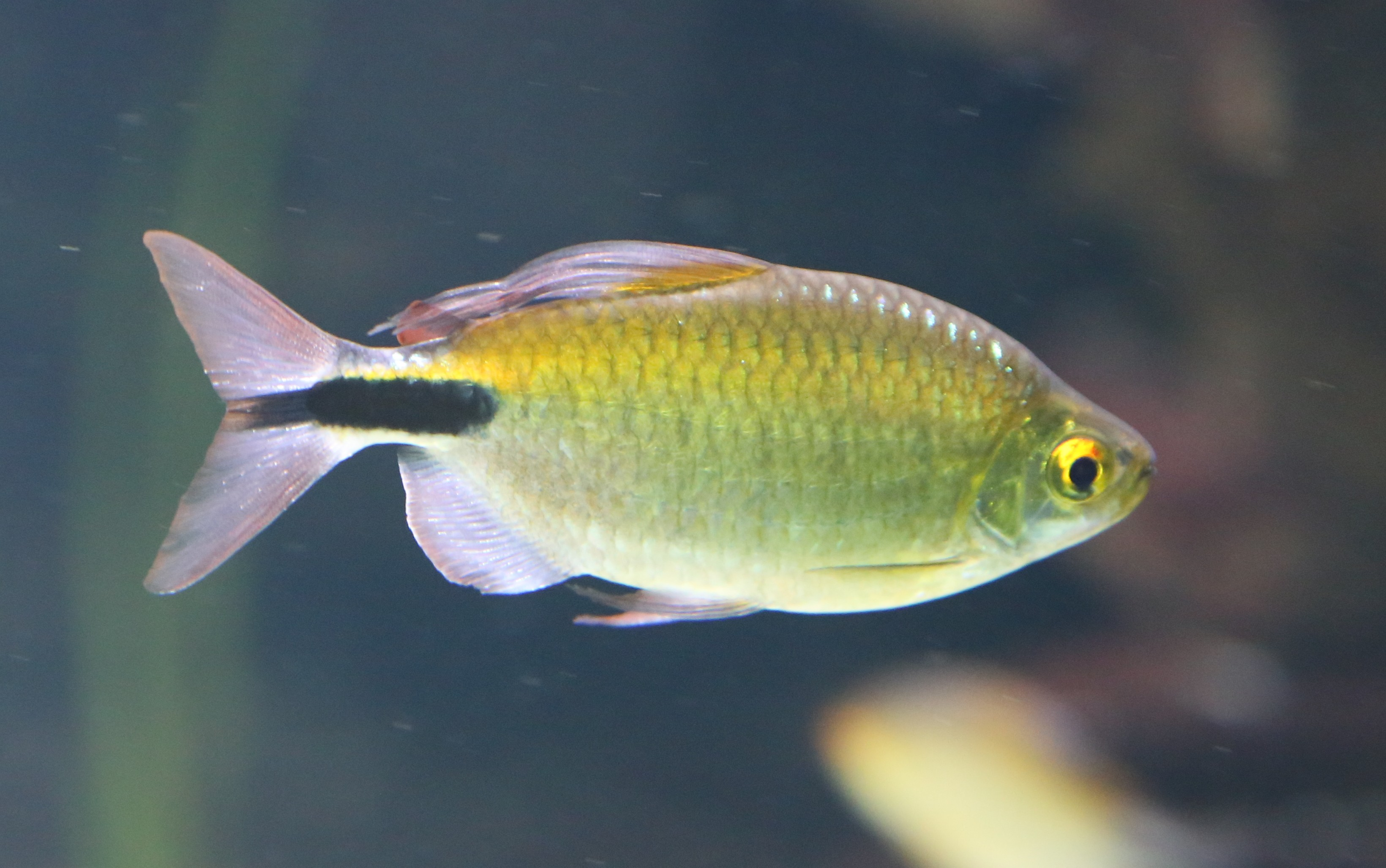

Conservation status
- Least Concern (IUCN 3.1)

Scientific classification
- Kingdom: Animalia
- Phylum: Chordata
- Class: Actinopterygii
- Order: Characiformes
- Family: Alestidae
- Genus: Bryconalestes
- Species: B. longipinnis

Binomial name
- Bryconalestes longipinnis (Günther, 1864)

Synonyms
- Alestes longipinnis (Günther, 1864); Brycinus longipinnis (Günther, 1864); Alestes chaperi Sauvage, 1882; Brycinus longipinnis bagbeensis Géry & Mahnert, 1977

= Bryconalestes longipinnis =

Species of fish

Bryconalestes longipinnis, the longfin tetra, African long-finned tetra or longfin characin, is a species of freshwater ray-finned fish belonging to the family Alestidae, the African tetras. This fish is found in Western Africa.

== Distribution ==
Bryconalestes longipinnis is native to the western coastal regions of Africa from The Gambia to Democratic Republic of the Congo. It is found in the upper and lower reaches of big rivers and also in estuarine mixohaline waters. It is the only Brycinus species also to penetrate small rivers and streams.

== Description ==
Bryconalestes longipinnis will grow to at least 5 in (13 cm) long although most specimens are smaller than this. The populations in the small streams are smaller fish than those in the big rivers. Although it is essentially a freshwater fish, Brycinus longipinnis will live in brackish estuarine waters.

== Diet ==
Bryconalestes longipinnis eats a wide range of animal and vegetable matter, including insect larvae, crustaceans and some algae.

In the aquarium it will eat most fish foods including both flakes and pellets without any trouble; it benefits from live or frozen food such as bloodworms, brine shrimp and Daphnia.
