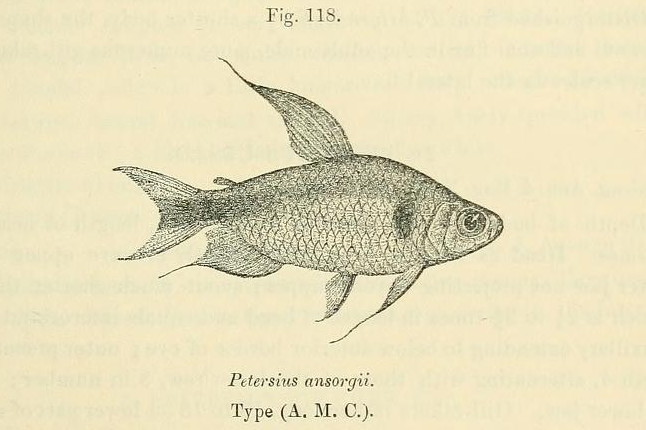

Conservation status
- Least Concern (IUCN 3.1)

Scientific classification
- Kingdom: Animalia
- Phylum: Chordata
- Class: Actinopterygii
- Order: Characiformes
- Family: Alestidae
- Genus: Nannopetersius
- Species: N. ansorgii

Binomial name
- Nannopetersius ansorgii (Boulenger, 1910)

Synonyms
- Petersius ansorgii Boulenger, 1910; Phenacogrammus ansorgii (Boulenger 1910); Petersius ubalo Boulenger, 1910

= Nannopetersius ansorgii =

Species of fish

Nannopetersius ansorgii is a species of freshwater ray-finned fish belonging to the family Alestidae, the African tetras. It is found in the central Africa in the Benito (Mbini), Chiloango, Kouilou, Loeme and Ogooué rivers of Gabon and Equatorial Guinea and the Bengo and Congo River basins of Angola and Democratic Republic of the Congo.

== Description ==
Nannopetersius ansorgii reaches a standard length of 7.0 cm (2.8 in).

== Etymology ==
The species epithet is named in honor of explorer William John Ansorge (1850–1913), who collected the type specimen.
