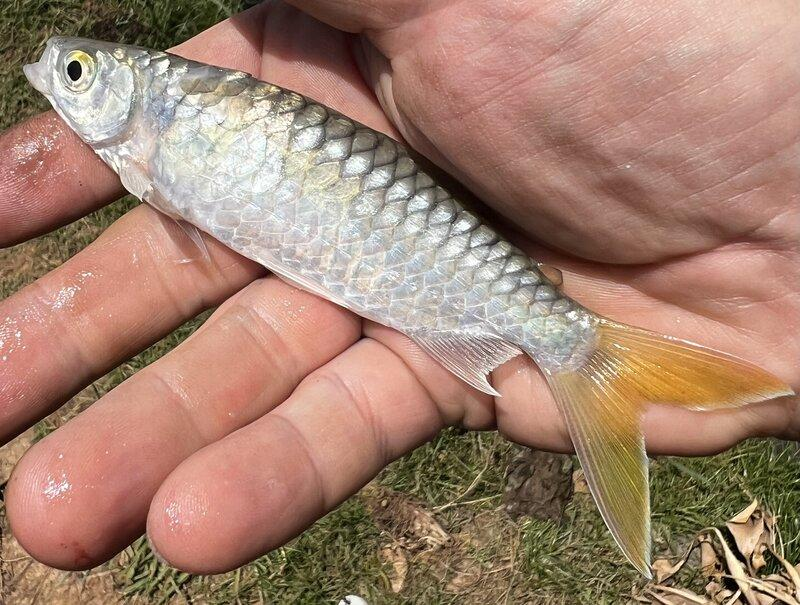

Conservation status
- Least Concern (IUCN 3.1)

Scientific classification
- Kingdom: Animalia
- Phylum: Chordata
- Class: Actinopterygii
- Order: Characiformes
- Family: Alestidae
- Genus: Brycinus
- Species: B. macrolepidotus

Binomial name
- Brycinus macrolepidotus (Valenciennes, 1850)

Synonyms
- Alestes macrolepidotus Bilharz, 1852; Alestes rutilus Boulenger, 1916

= Brycinus macrolepidotus =

Species of fish

Brycinus macrolepidotus, the true big-scale tetra or largescale robber, is a species of freshwater ray-finned fish belonging to the family Alestidae, the African tetras. This fish is widespread in tropical Africa.

== Taxonomy ==
Brycinus macrolepidotus was first formally described in 1850 by the French zoologist Achille Valenciennes with its type locality given as Senegal. When he described this species Valenciennes proposed the new genus Brycinus with B. macrolepidotus as its type species by monotypy. The genus Brycinus is classified within the African tetra family Alestidae, in the order Characiformes, the characins and allies.

== Etymology ==
Brycinus macrolepidotus is the type species of the genus Brycinus, a name for which Valenciennes did not explain its etymology but it may be a reference to the similarity of this fish to the fishes in the Neotropical genus Brycon, these taxa being considered to be members of the same family at the time, with the suffix -inus being adjectival. Brycon us derived from the Greek word brycho which means "to bite", "gnash teeth" or "guzzle", a reference to the large teeth in both jaws. The specific name macrolepidotus means "large scaled", the scales being described by Valenciennes as being "trés grande".

== Description ==
Brycinus macrolepidotus has a fusiform, or torpedo, shaped body with its depth being the equivalent of one third of the standard length. The anal fin has 13 soft rays and no spines while the origin of the dorsal fin is clearly posterior to the pelvic fins. The maximum standard length for this species is 52 cm (20 in).

== Distribution and habitat ==
Brycinus macrolepidotus is found throughout much of tropical Africa, although it is absent from the drainage system of the Gambia River. It has been recorded throughout the Congo River drainage system, and that of the Nile, as well as the catchments of Omo, the Senegal, Niger, Lake Chad, Volta drainages and the coastal basins of West Africa between Sierra Leone to Cameroon. It is no longer found in Egypt. This is a pelagic potamodromous species which is more numerous in river than in lakes
