= Alestopetersius leopoldianus =

Conservation status
- Least Concern (IUCN 3.1)

Scientific classification
- Kingdom: Animalia
- Phylum: Chordata
- Class: Actinopterygii
- Order: Characiformes
- Family: Alestidae
- Genus: Alestopetersius
- Species: A. leopoldianus

Binomial name
- Alestopetersius leopoldianus (Boulenger, 1899)

Synonyms
- Petersius leopoldianus Boulenger, 1899; Phenacogrammus leopoldianus (Boulenger, 1899)

Species of fish

Alestopetersius leopoldianus is a species of freshwater ray-finned fish belonging to the family Alestidae, the African tetras. This fish is found in Lake Mai-Ndombe, the middle Congo River, lower Lomami River and Wagenia Falls in the middle Congo River basin of the Democratic Republic of the Congo.

== Description ==
Alestopetersius leopoldianus reaches a total length of 9.0 cm (3.5 in).
