= Pangani robber =

Conservation status
- Least Concern (IUCN 3.1)

Scientific classification
- Kingdom: Animalia
- Phylum: Chordata
- Class: Actinopterygii
- Order: Characiformes
- Family: Alestidae
- Genus: Rhabdalestes
- Species: R. tangensis

Binomial name
- Rhabdalestes tangensis (Lönnberg, 1907)

Synonyms
- Petersius tangensis Lönnberg, 1907; Rhabdalestes leleupi Poll, 1967

Species of fish

The Pangani robber (Rhabdalestes tangensis) is a species of freshwater ray-finned fishes belonging to the family Alestidae, the African tetras. It is found in the Pangani River drainages, including Lake Jipe, in Tanzania and Kenya. Its natural habitats are rivers and lagoons.
