= Clupeocharax =

Conservation status
- Vulnerable (IUCN 3.1)

Scientific classification
- Kingdom: Animalia
- Phylum: Chordata
- Class: Actinopterygii
- Order: Characiformes
- Family: Alestidae
- Genus: Clupeocharax; Pellegrin, 1926
- Species: C. schoutedeni

Binomial name
- Clupeocharax schoutedeni Pellegrin, 1926

Synonyms
- Clupeopetersius Pellegrin, 1928

Species of fish

Clupeocharax is a monospecific genus of freshwater ray-finned fish belonging to the family Alestidae, the African tetras. The only species in the genus is Clupeocharax schoutedeni a fish that is endemic to the Democratic Republic of Congo.

== Taxonomy ==
Clupeocharax was first proposed as a genus in 1926 by the French ichthyologist Jacques Pellegrin when he described its only species, Clupeocharax schoutedeni. The type locality of C. schoutedeni was given as Tondu in the Democratic Republic of Congo. This taxon is classified within the African tetra family, Alestidae, in the order Characiformes.

== Etymology ==
Clupeocharax combines Clupea, Latin for "herring", a reference to this peagic species herring-like body, with Charax, the type genus of the order Characiformes. Charax is derived from the Greek word chárax, which means a "pointed stake in a palisade", an allausion to these fishes having densely arranged sharp teeth and which forms the root of many genus names of characins. The specific name honours Henri Schouteden, a Belgian zoologist who collected specimens in the Belgian Congo, including the holotype of this taxon.

== Description ==
Clupeocharax, as its name suggests, has a herring like body that grows to a maximum total length of 25 cm (9.8 in).

== Distribution and habitat ==
Clupeocharax is endemic to the Democratic Republic of Congo where it occurs in Lake Tumba and Lake Yandja, near Yangambi in the Central Congo River basin. It has also been collected in and around Lake Mai-Ndombe and it is likely that C. schoutendeni hase a wider distribution in Central Congo. This is a pelagic fish.

== Conservation ==
Clupeothorax is classified by the International Union for Conservation of Nature as Vulnerable, citing the example that overfishing has wiped out almost all the adult fish in Lake Tumba, so much that the former fishermen around the lake have ceased fishing and are now farmers.
