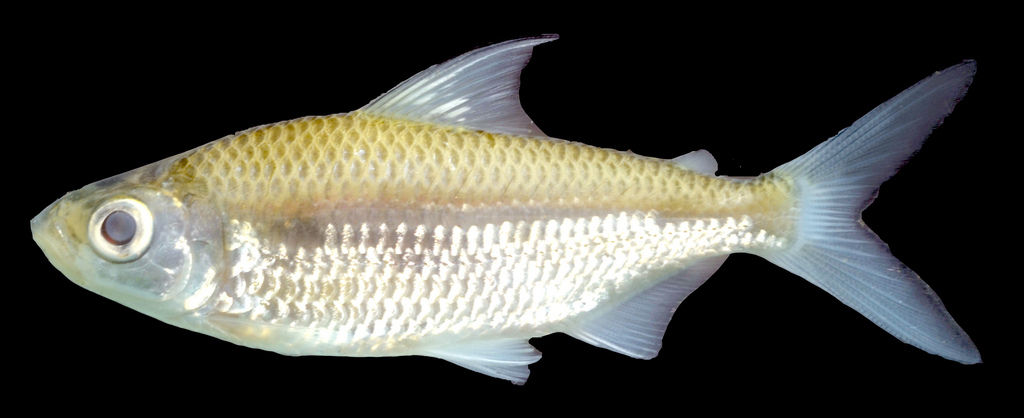
- Bryconaethiops sp.

Scientific classification
- Kingdom: Animalia
- Phylum: Chordata
- Class: Actinopterygii
- Order: Characiformes
- Family: Alestidae
- Genus: Bryconaethiops; Günther, 1873

Type species
- Bryconaethiops microstoma Günther, 1873

= Bryconaethiops =

Genus of fishes

Bryconaethiops is a genus of freshwater ray-finned fish belonging to the family Alestidae, the African tetras. The fishes in this genus are found in Western and Central Africa.

== Species ==
Bryconaethiops conains the following valid species:

- Bryconaethiops boulengeri Pellegrin, 1900
- Bryconaethiops macrops Boulenger, 1920
- Bryconaethiops microstoma Günther, 1873
- Bryconaethiops quinquesquamae Teugels & Thys van den Audenaerde, 1990
- Bryconaethiops yseuxi Boulenger, 1899
