= Rhabdalestes =

Scientific classification
- Kingdom: Animalia
- Phylum: Chordata
- Class: Actinopterygii
- Order: Characiformes
- Family: Alestidae
- Genus: Rhabdalestes; Hoedeman, 1951

Type species
- Petersius tangensis Lönnberg, 1907

Genus of fishes

Rhabdalestes is a genus of freshwater ray-finned fishes belonging to the family Alestidae, the African tetras. These fishes are found in Sub-Saharan Africa.

== Species ==
Rhbdalestes contains the following valid species:

- Rhabdalestes aeratis Stiassny & S. A. Schaefer, 2005
- Rhabdalestes barnardi (Herre, 1936)
- Rhabdalestes brevidorsalis (Pellegrin, 1921)
- Rhabdalestes maunensis (Fowler, 1935) (Okavango robber)
- Rhabdalestes rhodesiensis (Ricardo-Bertram, 1943) (Slender robber)
- Rhabdalestes septentrionalis (Boulenger, 1911)
- Rhabdalestes tangensis (Lönnberg, 1907) (Pangani robber)
- Rhabdalestes yokai Ibala Zamba & Vreven, 2008
