= Brachypetersius =

Scientific classification
- Kingdom: Animalia
- Phylum: Chordata
- Class: Actinopterygii
- Order: Characiformes
- Family: Alestidae
- Genus: Brachypetersius; Hoedeman, 1956

Type species
- Micralestes altus Boulenger, 1899

Genus of fishes

Brachypetersius is a genus of freshwater ray-finned fishes belonging to the family Alestidae, the African tetras. The fishes in this genus are found in Middle Africa.

== Species ==
Brachypetersius contains the following species:

- Brachypetersius altus (Boulenger, 1899)
- Brachypetersius cadwaladeri (Fowler, 1930)
- Brachypetersius gabonensis Poll, 1967
- Brachypetersius huloti (Poll, 1954)
- Brachypetersius notospilus (Pellegrin, 1930)
- Brachypetersius pseudonummifer Poll, 1967
