= Tricuspidalestes =

Conservation status
- Least Concern (IUCN 3.1)

Scientific classification
- Kingdom: Animalia
- Phylum: Chordata
- Class: Actinopterygii
- Order: Characiformes
- Family: Alestidae
- Genus: Tricuspidalestes; Poll, 1967
- Species: T. caeruleus

Binomial name
- Tricuspidalestes caeruleus (Matthes, 1964)

Synonyms
- Phenacogrammus caeruleus Matthes, 1964

Species of fish

Tricuspidalestes is monospecific genus of freshwater ray-finned fish belonging to the family Alestidae, the African tetras. The only species in the genus is Tricuspidalestes caeruleus, a species that is endemic to the Democratic Republic of Congo.
