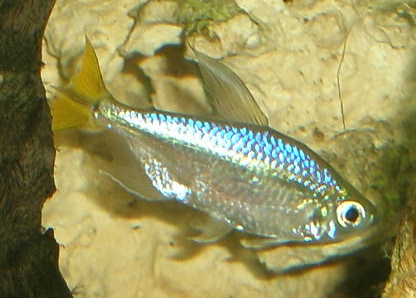
- Alestopetersius caudalis

Scientific classification
- Kingdom: Animalia
- Phylum: Chordata
- Class: Actinopterygii
- Order: Characiformes
- Family: Alestidae
- Genus: Alestopetersius; Hoedeman, 1951

Type species
- Petersius hilgendorfi Boulenger, 1899

Synonyms
- Petersialestes Hoedeman, 1951; Rhabdopetersius Hoedeman, 1951; Duboisialestes Poll, 1967

= Alestopetersius =

Genus of fishes

Alestopetersius is a genus of freshwater ray-finned fishes belonging to the family Alestidae, the African tetras. These fishes found mostly in Congo River Basin in Middle Africa with one species, A. smykalai, from the lower Niger River in Nigeria.

== Species ==
Alestopetersius contains the following valid species:

- Alestopetersius bifasciatus (Poll, 1967)
- Alestopetersius bleheri (Géry, 1995)
- Alestopetersius brichardi Poll, 1967
- Alestopetersius caudalis (Boulenger, 1899)
- Alestopetersius compressus (Poll & Gosse, 1963)
- Alestopetersius conspectus Mbimbi Mayi Munene & Stiassny, 2012
- Alestopetersius hilgendorfi (Boulenger, 1899)
- Alestopetersius leopoldianus (Boulenger, 1899)
- Alestopetersius nigropterus Poll, 1967
- Alestopetersius smykalai Poll, 1967
- Alestopetersius taeniatus (Géry, 1996)
- Alestopetersius tumbensis (Hoedeman 1951)
