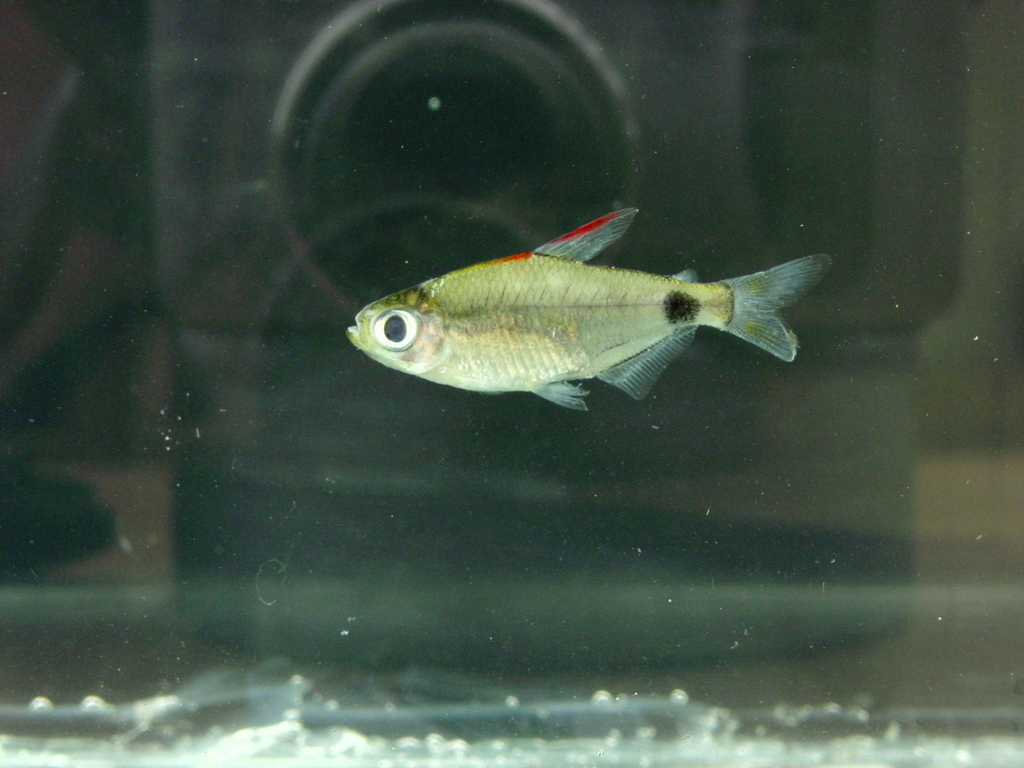

Scientific classification
- Kingdom: Animalia
- Phylum: Chordata
- Class: Actinopterygii
- Order: Characiformes
- Family: Alestidae
- Genus: Bathyaethiops; Fowler, 1949

Type species
- Bathyaethiops greeni Fowler, 1949

Synonyms
- Microlepidalestes Hoedeman, 1951

= Bathyaethiops =

Genus of fishes

Bathyaethiops is a genus of freshwater ray-finned fishes belonging to the family Alestidae, the African tetras. The fishes in this genus are found in Cameroon, Congo and Democratic Republic of Congo.

== Species ==
There are currently 6 recognized species in this genus:

- Bathyaethiops atercrinis Mamonekene & Stiassny, 2012 (Black-fin moon tetra)
- Bathyaethiops baka Moritz & Schliewen, 2016 (Dwarf moon tetra)
- Bathyaethiops breuseghemi (Poll, 1945) (Rectangle-spot moon tetra)
- Bathyaethiops caudomaculatus (Pellegrin, 1925) (African moon tetra)
- Bathyaethiops flammeus Moritz & Schliewen, 2016 (Red-back moon tetra)
- Bathyaethiops greeni Fowler, 1949 (Green's moon tetra)
