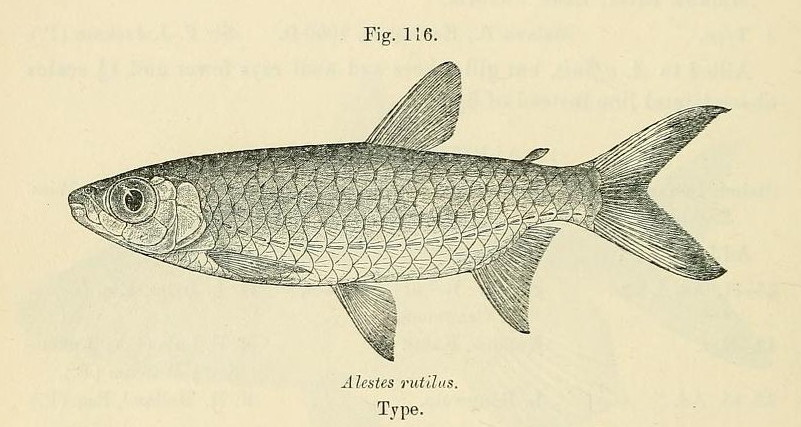
- Brycinus macrolepidotus

Scientific classification
- Kingdom: Animalia
- Phylum: Chordata
- Class: Actinopterygii
- Order: Characiformes
- Family: Alestidae
- Genus: Brycinus; Valenciennes, 1850

Type species
- Brycinus macrolepidotus Valenciennes, 1850

= Brycinus =

Genus of fishes

Brycinus is a genus of ray-finned fish in the family Alestiidae, the African tetras. Like other "African characids", they were formerly included in the Characidae but are actually somewhat more distantly related Characiformes.

Like some other Alestiidae, they are called robber tetras due to their bold and rather carnivorous habits. They are not infrequently kept as aquarium fishes and in their requirements resemble the South American tetras of the Characidae. Unlike these, Brycinus are not well-suited to accompany delicate fishes however and are better kept with dwarf cichlids and similar small but robust companions.

== Species ==
These are the currently recognized species in this genus:

- Brycinus batesii (Boulenger, 1903)
- Brycinus brevis (Boulenger, 1903)
- Brycinus carmesinus (Nichols & Griscom, 1917)
- Brycinus grandisquamis (Boulenger, 1899) (Pink-fin robber)
- Brycinus leuciscus (Günther, 1867)
- Brycinus luteus (Román, 1966)
- Brycinus macrolepidotus Valenciennes, 1850 (True big-scale tetra)
- Brycinus poptae (Pellegrin, 1906)
- Brycinus rhodopleura (Boulenger, 1906)
- Brycinus schoutedeni (Boulenger, 1912)
