= Petersius =

Conservation status
- Least Concern (IUCN 3.1)

Scientific classification
- Kingdom: Animalia
- Phylum: Chordata
- Class: Actinopterygii
- Order: Characiformes
- Family: Alestidae
- Genus: Petersius; Hilgendorf, 1894
- Species: P. conserialis

Binomial name
- Petersius conserialis Hilgendorf, 1894

Monospecific genus of fish

Petersius is monospecific genus of freshwater ray-finned fish belonging to the family Alestidae, the African tetras. The only species in the genus is Petersius conserialis. It is endemic to the Rufiji and Ruvu Rivers in Tanzania. Its natural habitat is rivers.
