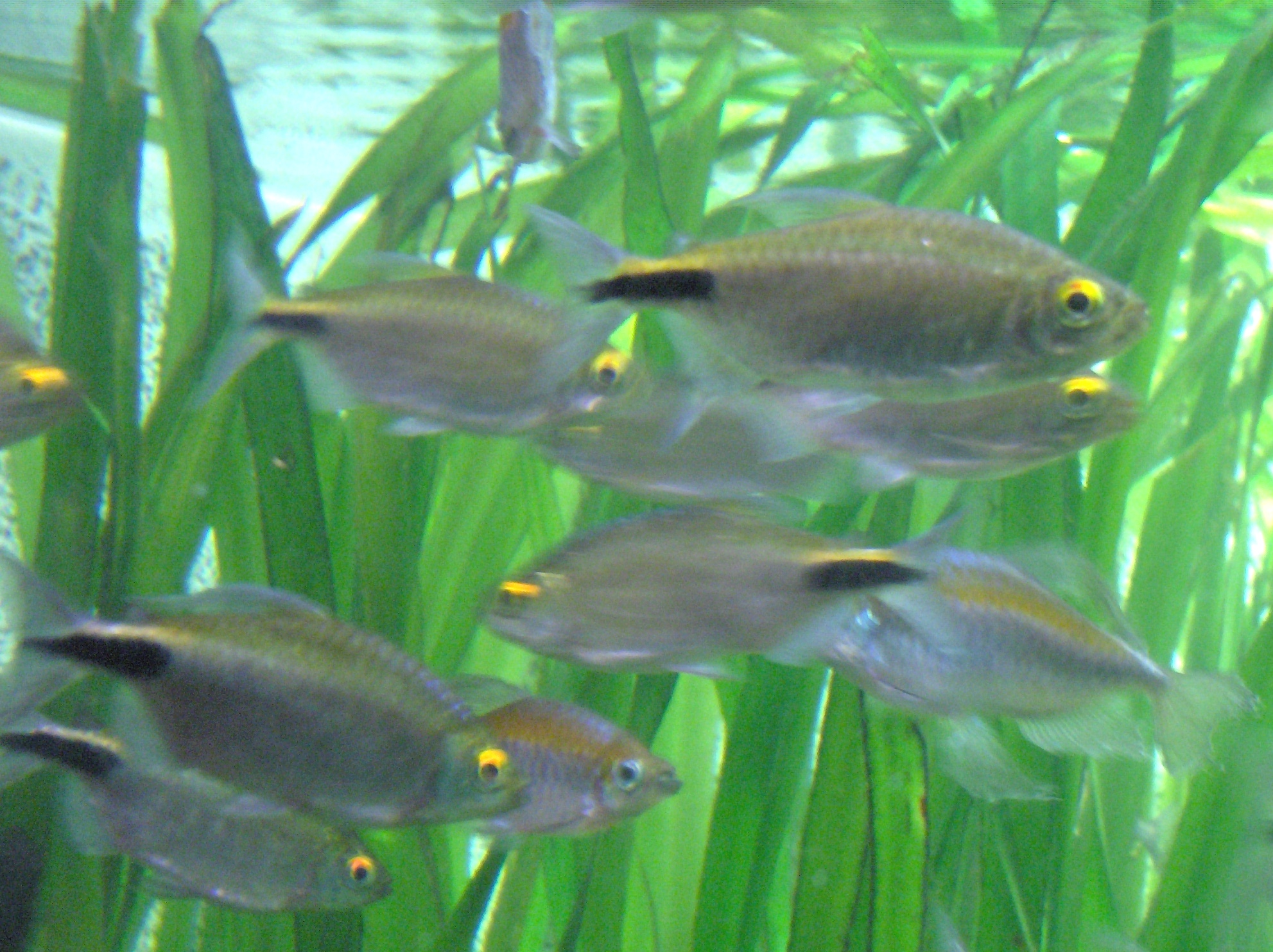
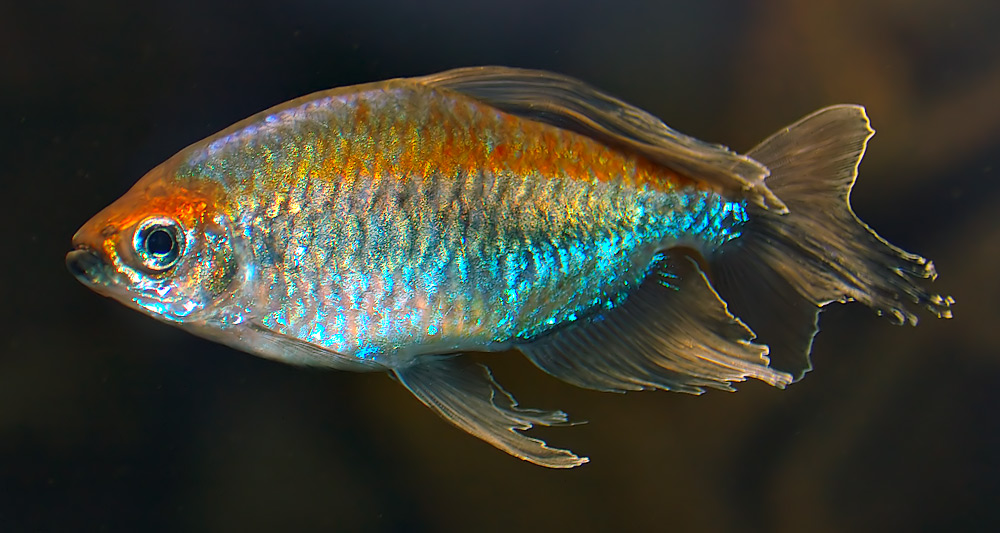
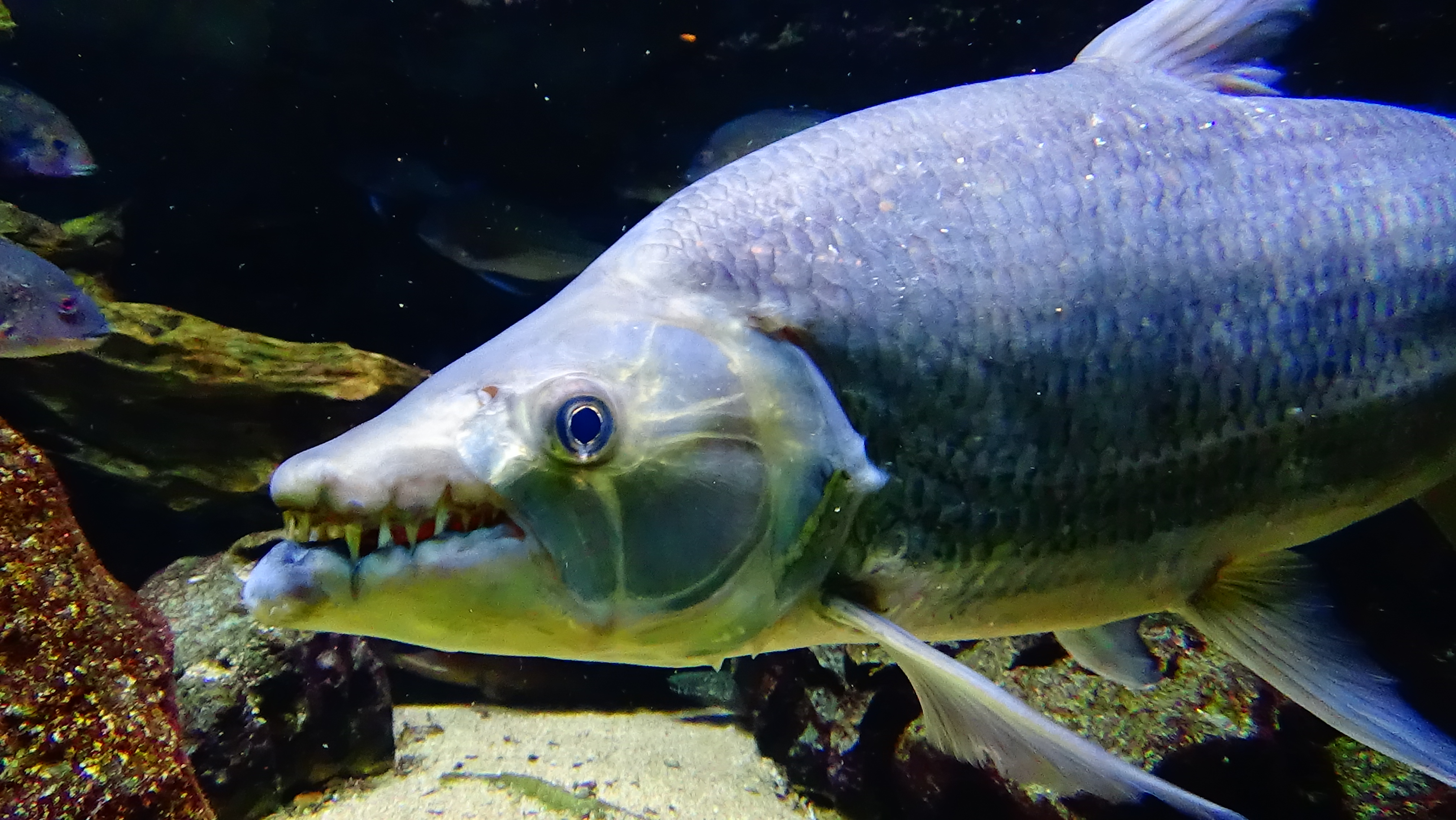
- Alestes macrophthalmus Brycinus longipinnis Phenacogrammus interruptus Hydrocynus goliath

Scientific classification
- Kingdom: Animalia
- Phylum: Chordata
- Class: Actinopterygii
- Division: Teleostei
- Order: Characiformes
- Suborder: Characoidei
- Family: Alestidae; Cockerell 1910

Genera
- See text

= Alestidae =

Alestidae Temporal range: Late Paleocene to present

Family of fishes

African tetras (family Alestidae, formerly spelled Alestiidae) are a group of characiform fish found exclusively in Africa. This family contains about 18 genera and 119 species. Among the best known members are the Congo tetra and African tigerfish; both are kept in aquaria, and tigerfish are utilized for food and as gamefish.

Although currently native only to African waterways, fossil evidence suggests that during the Paleogene, they ranged as far north as southern Europe and as far east as the Arabian subcontinent. Fossil remains date back to potentially the Late Paleocene with Hydrocynus remains known from Algeria. Alestid-like teeth are also known from the Late Cretaceous (Maastrichtian) of France, and phylogenetic evidence also suggests that they diverged around this time.

== Taxonomy ==
Taxonomy based on Van der Laan 2017 and Eschmeyer's Catalog of Fishes (2026):

- Family Alestidae Cockerell, 1910
  - Subfamily Petersiinae Poll, 1967 (Tanzania robbers)
    - Genus Petersius Hilgendorf, 1894
  - Subfamily Alestinae Cockerell, 1910 (African tetras)
    - Genus Alestes Müller & Troschel, 1844
    - Genus Alestion Roberts, 2019
    - Genus Bathyaethiops Fowler, 1949
    - Genus Brycinus Valenciennes, 1850
    - Genus Bryconaethiops Günther, 1873
    - Genus Bryconalestes Hoedeman, 1951
    - Genus Hydrocynus Cuvier, 1816
    - Genus Ladigesia Géry, 1968
    - Genus Micralestes Boulenger, 1899
    - Genus Rhabdalestes Hoedeman, 1951
    - Genus Tricuspidalestes Poll, 1967
  - Subfamily Clupeocharacinae Pellegrin, 1926 (Congo tetras)
    - Genus Alestopetersius Hoedeman, 1951
    - Genus Brachyalestes Günther, 1864
    - Genus Brachypetersius Hoedeman, 1956
    - Genus Clavocharax Wang, Stiassny & Melo, 2026
    - Genus Clupeocharax Pellégrin, 1926
    - Genus Hemigrammopetersius Pellégrin, 1926
    - Genus Nannopetersius Hoedeman, 1951
    - Genus Phenacogrammus C. H. Eigenmann, 1907

The following fossil genera are also known:

- Genus †Alestoides Monod & Gaudant, 1998 (Early Eocene of France)
- Genus †Arabocharax Micklich & Roscher, 1990 (Oligocene of Saudi Arabia)
- Genus †Bunocharax Van Neer, 1994 (Miocene of Africa)
- Genus †Eurocharax Gaudant, 1980 (?Oligocene of France)
- Genus ?†Mahengecharax Murray, 2003 (Middle Eocene of Tanzania, taxonomic identity disputed)
- Genus †Sindacharax Greenwood & Howes, 1975 (Miocene of Africa)

The Lepidarchidae, whose two genera were previously placed in this family, have been found to be an ancient group more closely related to the Hepsetidae, and are thus placed in their own family now.

Below are two cladograms: the left one is based on a maximum likelihood phylogenetic tree from a 2023 analysis of ultraconserved element (UCE) loci, while the right one is based on 2026 study's maximum likelihood tree analyzing UCEs with ultrafast bootstrap support:

- Hepsetus odoe
- - - Brycinus grandisquamis
    - Brycinus macrolepidotus
  - - - - Micralestes acutidens
        - Rhabdalestes rhodesiensis
      - - Alestes inferus
        - Hydrocynus goliath
    - - Brachyalestes spp.
      - - Bryconalestes longipinnis
        - - Bathyaethiops caudomaculatus
          - - Phenacogrammus interruptus
            - - Nannopetersius ansorgii
              - Alestopetersius leopoldianus

- Hepsetus kingsleyae
- - Brycinus macrolepidotus
  - - Bryconaethiops spp.
    - - - - Hydrocynus forskahlii
          - Alestes spp.
        - - Rhabdalestes tangensis
          - - Ladigesia roloffi
            - Micralestes spp.
      - - - Brachyalestes nurse
          - Tricuspidalestes caeruleus
        - - Bryconalestes longipinnis
          - Clupeocharacinae
            - Clavocharax spp.
            - - - Clupeocharax schoutedeni
                - Phenacogrammus spp.
              - - - Hemigrammopetersius urotaenia
                  - Brachypetersius spp.
                - - Alestopetersius spp.
                  - Nannopetersius spp.
