= Wildlife of Mali =

The wildlife of Mali, composed of its flora and fauna, is widely varying from the Saharan desert zone (covering about 33% of the country) to the Sahelian east–west zone, to Mali, a landlocked francophone country in North Africa; large swathes of Mali remain unpopulated but has three sub-equal vegetation zones; the country has Sahara Desert in the north, the Niger River Basin at its center and the Senegal River on the south.

The vegetation zones are the Saharan, the Sahel, and the Sudan–Guinea Savanna. Mali has many protected areas which include two national parks, one biosphere reserve, six faunal reserves, two partial faunal reserves, two sanctuaries (one is a UNESCO designated World Heritage Site), one chimp sanctuary, six game reserves, and three Ramsar Sites.

Protected area in Mali, under legal acts and regulations (Law No. 86-43/AN-RM for trade and conservation of parks and reserves and Law No. 86-42/AN-RM for forest code), cover about 5,760.035 square kilometres (2,223.962 sq mi), which is 4.7% area of the country. Adding the buffer zone and the peripheral zone of the Biosphere of Baoul, it becomes 6.2% of the total area of the country. The rich biodiversity of the country is reflected in its more than 1,700 plant species and about 1,000 animal species.

== Geography ==
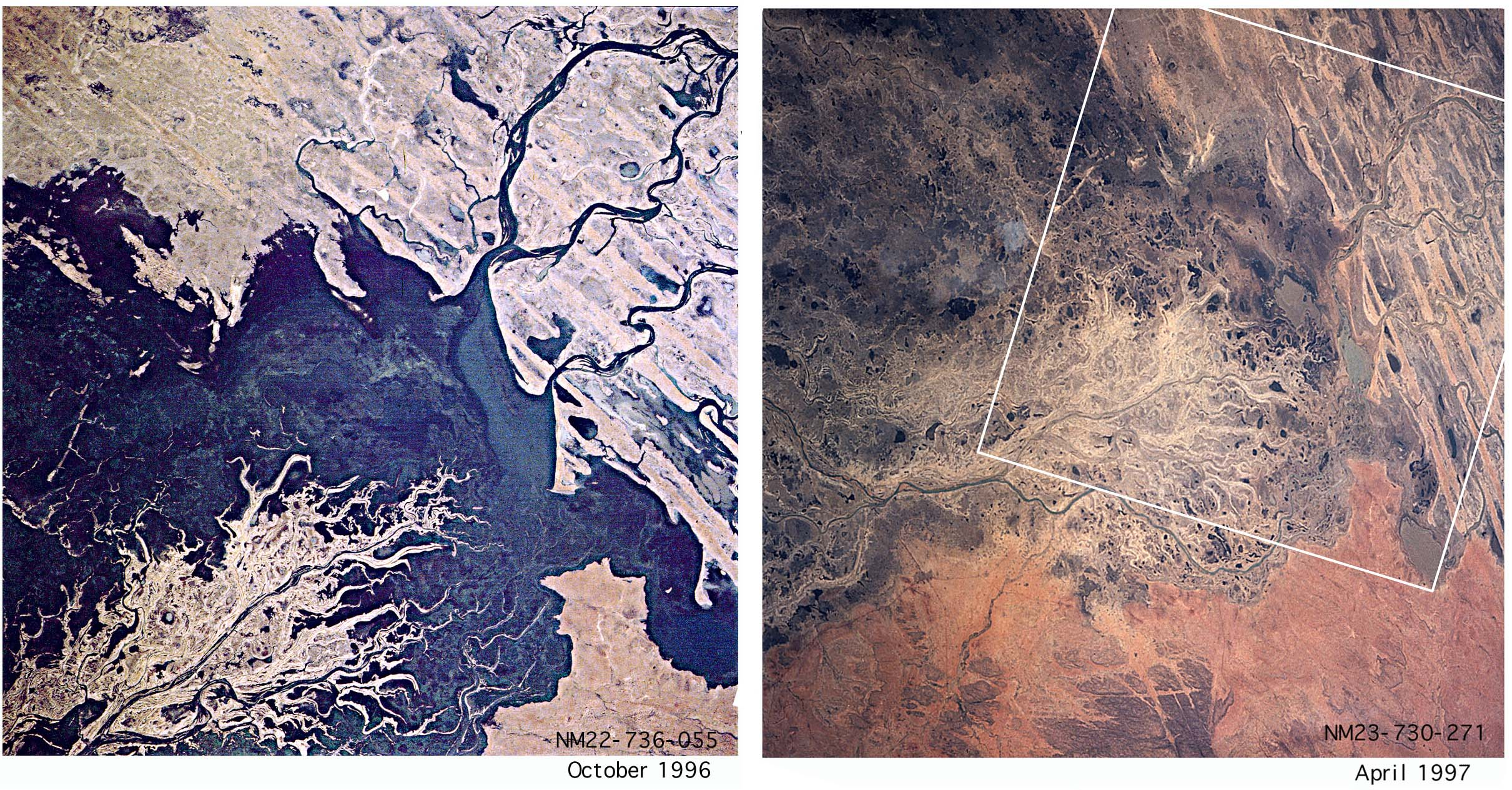
October, 1996: the dark green vegetation is lush when water from the summer rains passes through the region, causing floods. It provides a strong visual contrast with the surrounding desert countryside. By April 1997, the wetlands dry up, and the inland delta attains a uniform tan colour. The white box outlines the area covered by view.

=== Niger River valley ===
The Niger River valley, which dominates the topography of Mali, drained by the Niger River and its tributaries. Along its course, the central southern region is the narrowest and is known as the Inner Delta or the Inundation Zone of the Niger, formed of 38,000 square kilometres (15,000 sq mi) of flood-plains, along a river length of 570 kilometres (350 mi); these form its wetlands of great ornithological interest.

=== Saharan zone ===
Habitat wise, the Saharan zone occupies a third of the country, and is made up of Sahara Desert and the Sahel (which is a zone of transition between the two). There is hardly any vegetation as the habitat comprises "unvegetated regs, hamadas, dunes and wadis" and also a few oases.

On the south-eastern part of this zone is the Adrar des Iforhas Massif rising to a height of 900 metres (3,000 ft), which is part of the Ahaggar Massif in southern Algeria. Average precipitation in the zone is reported to be less than 200 millimetres (7.9 in).

=== Sahelian zone ===
The Sahelian zone, widest in an east–west direction, has the Dogon plateau (777 metres (2,549 ft)) elevation) and the Hombori mountains (1,155 metres (3,789 ft), highest location in Mali) with the Inundation Zone of the Niger River located to its west. Average annual rainfall varies from about 600 millimetres (24 in) in the south to under 200 millimetres (7.9 in) in the north; the vegetation also changes accordingly from acacia-wooded grassland and deciduous bushland to thin coverage of annual grasslands (of Cenchrus biflorus).

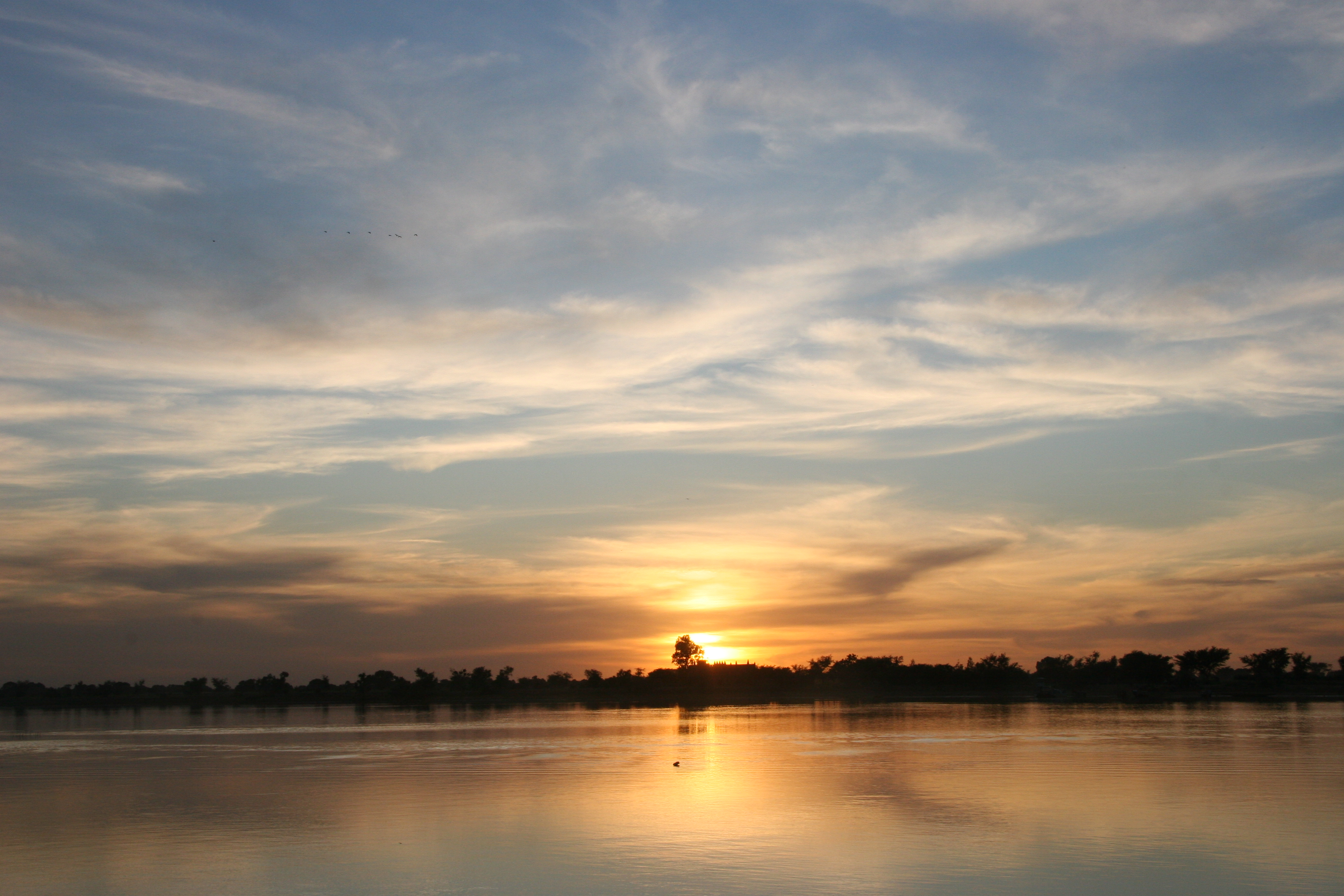
Sunset over the Bani River in Mali.

=== Sudan–Guinea zone ===
The Sudan–Guinea zone is part of south-western region of Mali. The Senegal River and the Bafing and Baoulé Rivers rise here, and the basin is known for the lowest-lying land in the country of 20,000 square kilometres (7,700 sq mi) area which is below the 100 metres (330 ft) contour.

The zone also includes the Manding plateau (near Bamako, the capital of Mali) which is part of Fouta Djallon Mountains (700 metres (2,300 ft) elevation) of Guinea. This forms the upper region of the catchment area that lies between the Senegal and Niger River systems. Geological formation reported is of sandstone. Vegetation in this zone is mainly of Isoberlinia sp.

== Protected areas ==
There is very little wildlife and a few national parks in Mali. The reserve and largest national park is the Boucle du Baoulé National Park (7,710 square kilometres (2,980 sq mi)). located to the northeast of Bamako. There is hardly any wildlife left in this park due to intense poaching of elephants, giraffes, buffalo, chimpanzees and lions. Monkeys are the only animals seen now.

The Reserve de Ansongo Menaka is in the southeast, near the border with Niger. The Reserve de Douentza is the most interesting in terms of wildlife. Bafing National Park (5,000 square kilometres (1,900 sq mi)). is in the south west bordering with Guinea which is a dry area between Mopti and Gao; it is home for desert elephants which move with change of seasons.

The other notable parks are the Wongo National Park and the Kouroufing National Park. The Bafing Biosphere Reserve covers an area of 5,215 square kilometres (2,014 sq mi) and the Bafing Chimpanzee Sanctuary is exclusive to conserve chimpanzees.

== Flora ==
The dominant vegetation in the inland delta of the Niger consists of hygrophilous grassland species of Eragrostis atrovirens, Panicum anabaptistum, Panicum fluviicola, Vetiveria nigritana, Echinochloa stagnina, wild rice Oryza barthii, Andropogon gayanus, Cynodon dactylon and Hyparrhenia dissolute. The many tree species reported are in patches. Dominant species of grasses in the transition zone between the higher levels of flood plains and its flooded zones are Acacia nilotica with Mimosa and Ziziphus spp. and Guiera senegalensis, Borassus and Hyphaene. Cram cram grasses are scattered in Mali.

== Fauna ==
=== Mammals ===
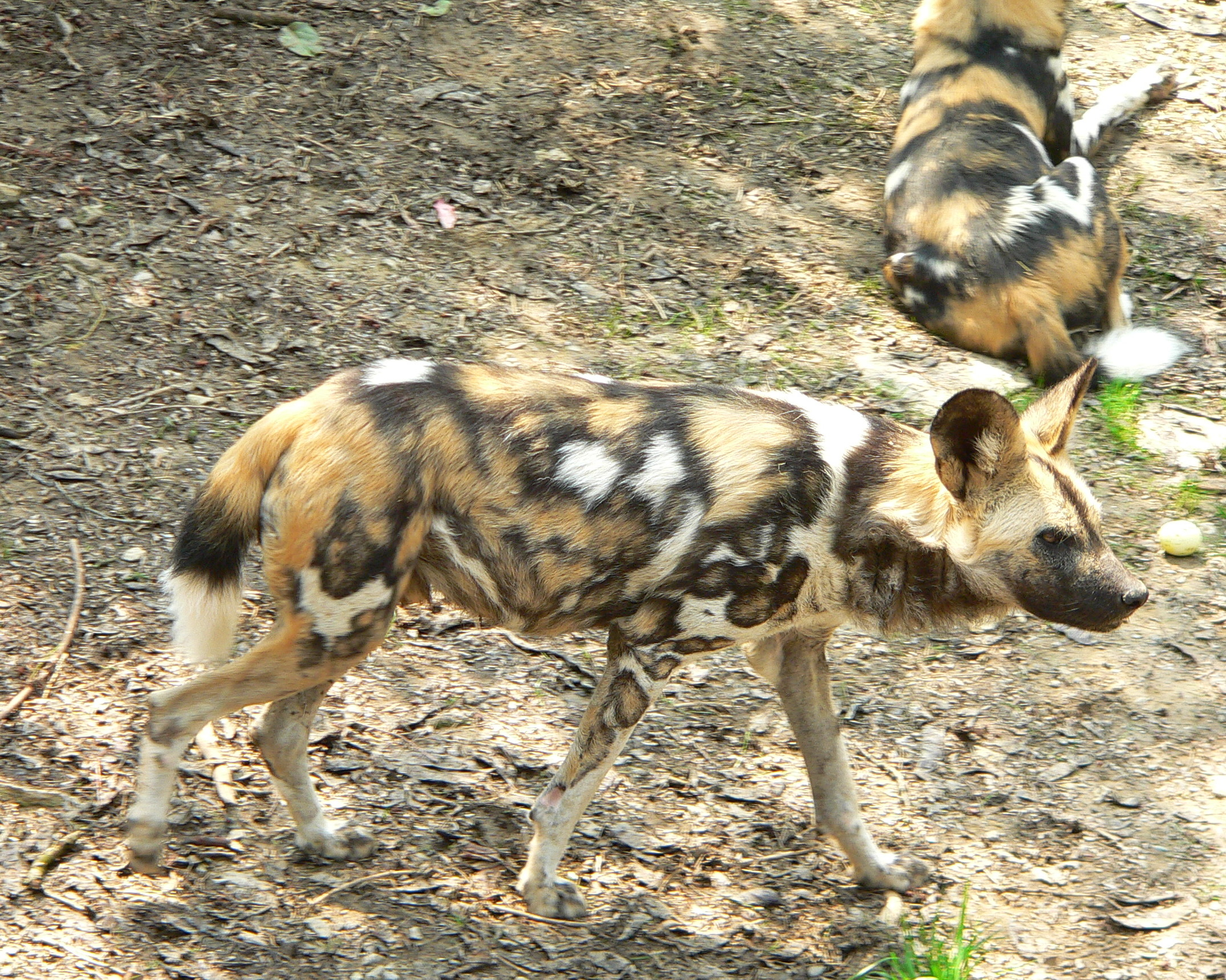
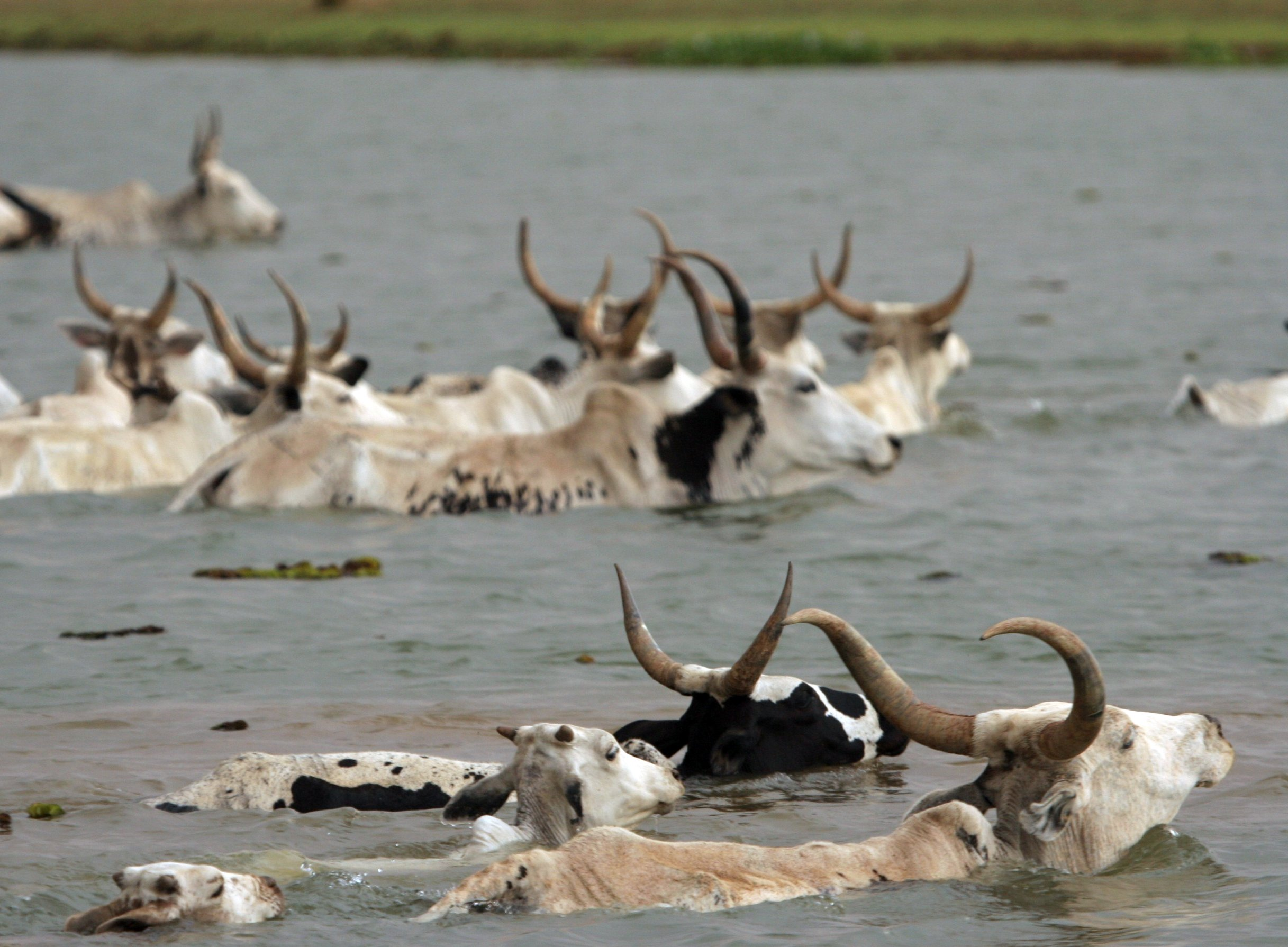
Left: African wild dogs (Lycaon pictus); right: cattle crossing the Niger River near Segou, Mali.

There are 146 species of mammals in Mali of which 2 are critically endangered (CR), 3 are endangered (EN), 10 are vulnerable (VU), and 3 are near-threatened (NT). The threatened species are the following.

- Addax nasomaculatus (addax) (CR)
- Gazella dama (dama gazelle) (CR)
- Pan troglodytes (common chimpanzee) (EN)
- Gazella leptoceros (rhim gazelle) (EN)
- Lycaon pictus (African wild dog) (EN)
- Ammotragus lervia (Barbary sheep) (VU)
- Acinonyx jubatus (cheetah) (VU)
- Loxodonta africana (African bush elephant) (VU)
- Trichechus senegalensis (African manatee) (VU)
- Profelis aurata (African golden cat) (VU)
- Panthera leo (lion) (VU)
- Gazella dorcas (dorcas gazelle) (VU)
- Hippopotamus amphibius (hippopotamus) (VU)
- Gazella rufifrons (red-fronted gazelle) (VU)
- Hipposideros jonesi (Jones's roundleaf bat) (NT)
- Felis margarita (sand cat) (NT)
- Crocuta crocuta (spotted hyena) (NT)

Chimpanzees are found in the southernmost forests and monkeys are found in the Parc national de la Boucle du Baoule. Elephants in the Gourma region, known as the Sahelian herds of 360 to 630 numbers, migrate over 870 kilometres (540 mi) (round trip) during the dry season between Burkina Faso and Mali to lake areas and return to Mali during the rainy season. Mali lions are found only around the Faleme River in the far west of cerde of Kenieba. Papio papio (Guinea baboon) and Massoutiera mzabi (Mzab gundi) are also reported.

The African manatee (also known as the sea cow and West African manatee) is found all along the Niger River was hunted for meat in the past but its meat is now not marketed, which may be due its decreasing numbers or due to the legal protection given for its conservation.

=== Birds ===
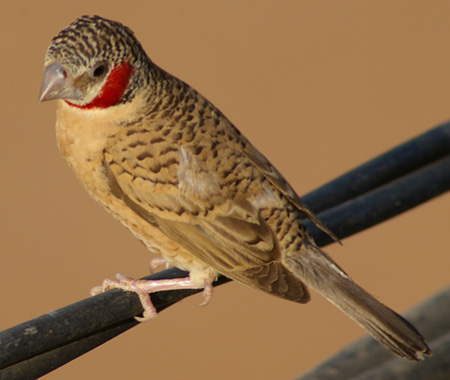
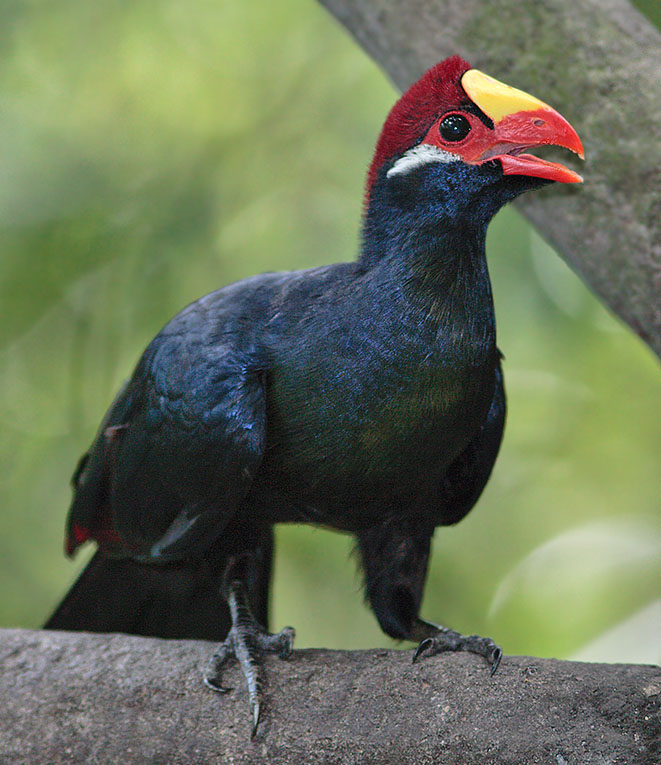
Left: cut-throat finch; right: violet turaco

Seventeen Important Bird Areas (IBAs) have been designated in Mali, encompassing an area of 28,692 square kilometres (11,078 sq mi) (about 2.3% of the surface area of the country). Ten include wetlands, nine are in the Inner Delta of the Niger river (key bird area), four (under the A3 criterion) include the Sudan–Guinea ecoregion of the Savanna biome, four are in the Sahel biome, and two in the Sahara–Sindian biome. The Kulicoro firefinch, also known as the Mali firefinch (Lagonostica virata), is the only endemic bird of Mali, found in rocky and grassy areas near Mopti and Bamako.

In these IBAs, 622 bird species have been recorded; there have been 335 resident species noted, with 202 of these breeding in Mali. Additionally, 137 species of the noted 243 migratory species are of Palearctic origin. There are 12 species which are of global conservation concern, with seven being vagrants (Palearctic migrants). These are Marmaronetta angustirostris (VU), Aythya nyroca (VU), Circus macrourus (NT), Falco naumanni (VU), Neotis nuba (Nubian bustard) (NT), Gallinago media (NT), Glareola nordmanni (NT), Acrocephalus paludicola (VU), Lagonosticta virata (NT), Prinia fluviatilis (DD), Ceratogymna elata (NT).

The Inner Delta is also rich in waterfowl and heron species, particularly the cosmopolitan Bubulcus ibis (LC) and Casmerodius albus (LC), as well as the world’s largest heron, Ardea goliath (Goliath heron, LC). The Goliath heron, which has small populations in South Asia as well, can stand upwards of 152 cm/5 ft tall, with a 230 cm/7 ft wingspan. Poicephalus senegalus (Senegal parrot, LC), Serinus mozambicus (yellow-fronted canary, LC) and Haliaeetus vocifer (African fish eagle, LC) are some of the other, more common, avian species reported in Mali.

=== Reptiles and amphibians ===
A few reptile species reported are Cerastes cerastes (desert horned viper) and Geochelone sulcata (African spurred tortoise). Other species of snakes or cobra are: Bitis arietans (puff adder), Cerastes cerastes (horned viper), Dispholidus typus (boomslang), Echis jogeri (Joger's carpet viper), Echis leucogaster (white-bellied carpet viper), Echis ocellatus (West African carpet viper), Naja katiensis (West African brown spitting cobra), Naja melanoleuca (forest cobra), Naja nigricollis (black-necked spitting cobra), and Naja senegalensis (Senegalese cobra).

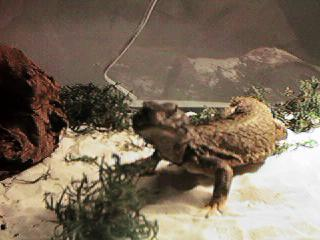
Mali Uromastyx.

The Mali Uromastyx, Uromastyx maliensis, is a widely known species of lizard in Mali. Skink genera in Mali include Chalcides and Trachylepis. Other lizard species known in the Dogon Country of Mali are Agama sankaranica, Uromastyx geyri, Sphenops delislei, Trachylepis perrotetii, Trachylepis quinquetaeniata, Chalcides ocellatus, Chamaeleo africanus, Ptyodactylus ragazzii, Tarentola ephippiata, Tarentola annularis, Tropiocolotes tripolitanus, Latastia longicaudata, Varanus griseus, and Varanus niloticus. Turtles include Pelomedusa subrufa, and crocodiles include the Nile crocodile and Mecistops cataphractus (African slender-snouted crocodile).

The Dogon are also familiar with the colubrid species Psammophis sibilans, Psammophis elegans, and Bamanophis dorri, and the cobra species Naja nigricollis (black spitting cobra) and Naja haje (Egyptian cobra). Other snake species of the Dogon Country in Mali include Atractaspis watsoni, Eryx muelleri, Python regius, Python sebae, Telescopus obtusus, and Cerastes vipera.

Most fatal snakebites in Mali are due to encounters with Bitis spp. (particularly Bitis arietans) and Echis spp. (particularly Echis leucogaster and others). Untreated bites from Bitis species can result in hemorrhage (bleeding) within 5 hours, and Echis bites can cause hemorrhage in 1-2 days.

Among the amphibians, Tomopterna milletihorsini (Mali screeching frog) and Bufo chudeaui (Bata marsh toad) are notable in Mali. In Dogon country, amphibian species that are well known by the local Dogon people include the edible bullfrog Hoplobatrachus occipitalis, Amnirana galamensis (Galam white-lipped frog), Phrynobatrachus accraensis, Hyperolius nitidulus (or Hyperolius viridiflavus), Amietophrynus xeros, Amietophrynus regularis, and Sclerophrys pentoni. Amietophrynus channingi and Hildebrandtia ornata are also reported from Dogon Country.

=== Fish ===
There are approximately 200 fish species in Mali. Fishing is a common practice in the Niger and other rivers in Mali, and the most popular variety of fish is capitaine.

Many species of fish are found in the Niger River and its tributaries. Along the northern bend of the river in the eastern half of Mali, reported fish species include Alestes baremoze, Alestes dentex sethente, Brycinus macrolepidotus, Brycinus nurse, Hydrocynus forskahlii, Micralestes elongatus, Marcusenius senegalensis, Bagrus bajad, Synodontis schall, Schilbe intermedius, Clarias anguillaris/Clarias gariepinus, Malapterurus electricus, Mastacembelus nigromarginatus, Lates, Oreochromis niloticus, Citharinus latus, Labeo senegalensis, Mormyrus rume, Protopterus annectens, Tetraodon lineatus, Brycinus leuciscus, Sarotherodon galilaeus, Polypterus senegalus, Hydrocynus brevis, Heterotis niloticus, Hyperopisus bebe, Gymnarchus niloticus, Hepsetus odoe, Distichodus brevipinnis, Citharidium ansorgei, Citharinops distichodoides, Citharinus citharus, Labeo coubie, Bagrus docmac, Clarotes laticeps, Chrysichthys auratus, Chrysichthys nigrodigitatus, Auchenoglanis biscutatus, Auchenoglanis occidentalis, Schilbe mystus, Heterobranchus bidorsalis, Synodontis batensoda, Synodontis membranacea, Synodontis resupinata, Synodontis clarias, Synodontis budgetti, Synodontis vermiculata, Synodontis sorex, Synodontis gobroni, Synodontis filamentosa, Synodontis melanoptera, Synodontis nigrita, Arius gigas, Hemichromis, and Tilapia zillii.

Many villages along the Niger River export fish and fish products to neighbouring regions. For example, in Mopti Region, fishing villages near Konna regularly export fish to market towns in the dry inland Dogon country, such as Douentza. In Douentza, fish species that are commonly found in the market are catfish (especially Clarias and Bagrus spp.), carp (Sarotherodon and Oreochromis spp.), capitaine (Lates spp.), dogfish (Hydrocynus spp.), Mormyrus, Marcusenius, and Labeo fish species. Although most Dogon villages do not have direct local access to fresh fish, some villages are located near pools at the bottoms of escarpments that harbour fish species belonging to genera such as Clarias, Marcusenius, and Brycinus.

=== Invertebrates ===
Termites are a unique feature of Mali found in many uncleared locations. Their habitat is notably along with specific trees and plants, and alates or flying ants are the species housed in the ant hills. A documentary on these termite hills has been made under the title "Termites: Castles of Clay", which is about the "Soul of the White ant". Other insects reported are Dracunculus medinensis (Guinea worm) and Necator americanus (hookworm). Scorpions are noted; the female Anopheles mosquito carries malaria.

== Threats ==
The threats to the wildlife of Mali are on account of deforestation (in 1997, the economic damage amounted to an estimated 5.35 per cent of GDP,) intensive hunting pressure, proliferation of livestock farming, extension of agricultural land and also due to desertification (Sahara desert extending, erosion and drought due to climate change). In the past, droughts in the 1970s and 1980s (last great drought was in 1984) have also contributed to the decline of wildlife resources of the country.

Increased anthropogenic and livestock pressures, due to people moving to the southern part of the country and settling on river banks, has also compounded the threats. Particular mention of effect on the fauna in the wild is of antelope species which are threatened. Other significant contributors to biodiversity degradation relate to pollution, mining, crop cultivation and also indiscriminate traditional slash and burn farming. Another aspect in the past was of concentrating protection measures only in the southwestern savannah region.

== Conservation ==
The conservation of the protected areas is the responsibility of the National Parks Department of Mali. However, conservation and preservation of forest lands (including gazetted forest) rests with the Forest Service and both these agencies fall under the purview of the Department of Water and Forests of the Ministry of Natural Resources and Livestock. In the past, the traditional practice of protecting the forests and its flora and fauna rested with the Village elders. However, with Islam making inroads into the country, traditional rules have been relegated to a backseat and has resulted in over exploitation of the forest resources, which has been further aggravated by increased anthropological pressures.

A major conservation effort has been launched with funding provided by the Global Environmental Facility (under the aegis of the UNDP) to be completed by 2014 with the objective of substantially increasing the area under protection estate and reinforce the management instruments to achieve effective protection area, particularly the southwest region in respect of endangered mammal species of Derby eland and the western chimpanzee.

== Gallery ==
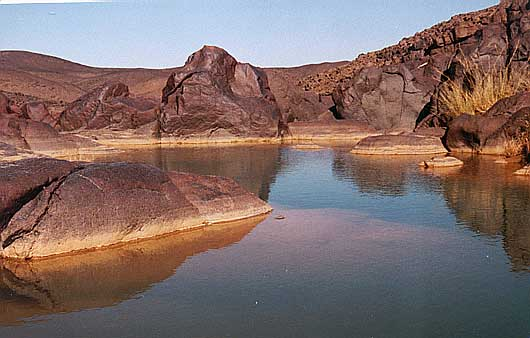
Taguelmoust, near d'Oubankort in l'Adrar des Ifoghas
