= Bade language =

West Chadic language spoken in Nigeria

Bade
- Gabaden
- Native to: Nigeria
- Region: Yobe State, Jigawa State
- Native speakers: 360,000 (2020)
- Language family: Afro-Asiatic: Chadic; West Chadic; Bade–Warji; Bade languages (B.1); Bade

Language codes
- ISO 639-3: bde
- Glottolog: bade1248
- ELP: Bade; Shirawa

Bade (also spelled Bede, Bedde, or Bode) is a West Chadic language spoken by the Bade people in Yobe State and Jigawa State, Nigeria. Their traditional ruler is the Emir of Bade. Similar to many other Western African languages, Bade is a vulnerable language at great risk of extinction. With 356,000 speakers, the language and the culture of the Bade people have suffered over the last several years. As the language continues to fade, the culture and historic value associated with the language perishes as well. The local dialect is shifting from Bade to Hausa. Across West Africa, the impact on local communities through the loss of the indigenous tongues will be significant. The endangerment of the Bade language represents the worldwide language diversity that is at risk. Many African languages have only received little linguistic attention, impacting these African languages.

== Classification ==
Bade is classified under the following categories: Afro-Asiatic, Chadic, West, B, B.1, Bade Proper.

== History ==
While historical information about the Bade language is limited in scope, many words in the Bade language take root in the Kanuri language. The Kanuri language is primarily spoken in West Africa, including: Nigeria and Chad. Bade and Ngizim have borrowed a number of words from the Kanuri language. According to traditional accounts, the Bade language itself originates from the Badr of Yemen and Muhammad purportedly drove the Bade people out after a failure to pray. Currently, as one of the many Nigerian endangered languages, bade serves as a local dialect. In general, Nigerian languages comprise the wealth of linguistic diversity that exists in the country. Over the years, colonization has also played a role in the deteroriation of local languages, which Bade happens to be among, that for now, most of the Bade villages are becoming Hausa speaking villages.

== Geographic distribution ==
The speakers of the Bade language are centered in Nigeria. It is spoken in the northern part of Yobe State, Nigeria.

=== Official status ===
The language is not the official language of Nigeria or any other country.

=== Dialects/varieties ===
There are three dialects of the Bade language that coincide with regions:

- Gashua Bade (Mazgarwa)
- Southern Bade (Bade-Kado)
- Western Bade (Amshi, Maagwaram, Shirawa)

== Phonology ==
Most West Chadic languages have a similar consonant inventory separated into eight major groups: labialized laryngeal, laryngeal, labialized velar, velar, lateral, alveopalatal, alveolar, and labial. In the Bade/Ngizim languages, the glottal stop plays no role, but the vowel hiatus relies on elision and coalescence. The sounds also feature a "yawning" and has a shift from fricative to stop.

=== Consonants ===
		Labial	Alveolar		Post-alv./ Palatal	Velar		Glottal	
		Labial	plain	lateral	Post-alv./ Palatal	plain	lab.	plain	lab.
Nasal		m	n		ɲ	ŋ			
Stop/ Affricate	voiceless	p	t		t͡ʃ	k	kʷ		
Stop/ Affricate	voiced	b	d		d͡ʒ	ɡ	ɡʷ		
Stop/ Affricate	prenasal	ᵐb	ⁿd		ⁿd͡ʒ	ᵑɡ	ᵑɡʷ		
Stop/ Affricate	implosive	ɓ	ɗ		ɗ̠ʲ				
Fricative	voiceless	f	s	ɬ	ʃ			h	hʷ
Fricative	voiced	v	z	ɮ	ʒ			ɦ	ɦʷ
Rhotic			r		ɽ				
Approximant				l	j		w	(ˀj)	

- /r/ may also be heard as a flap [ɾ].
- /ɗ̠ʲ/ may also be heard as [ˀj].

=== Vowels ===
	Front	Central	Back
Close	i iː	ɨ	u uː
Mid	eː		oː
Open		a aː	

== Grammar ==
The grammar for the Bade language is consistent with the Ngizim language.

=== Morphology and syntax ===
The Bade/Ngizim languages slightly differ from other Chadic languages. Bade and Ngizim have long vowels in closed syllables. Mid vowels also have a restricted use compared to other vowels. Mid vowels will rather appear as loanwords from other languages. The language preserves diphthongs in both native and loanwords.

== Vocabulary ==
The Bade language has strong influence from the Kanuri language. There are many loanwords from Kanuri to West Chadic languages, including Bade. Bade is commonly grouped with the Ngizim language. As an example, the word "healthy" is nga in the Kanuri language and ngā in the Ngizim language. More recently, the Hausa language has influenced the Bade language.

=== Fish names ===
Below are some fish names of the Hadejia-Nguru wetlands in Bade, along with their Hausa and Manga Kanuri equivalent names. Note that many of the species have not been observed recently, due to the drying up of the region.

Scientific name	English	Bade	Hausa	Manga Kanuri	Present in 2003?
	fish (general)	Vunakon	kíífíí	búnì	
		kur cibil	?		
		awgirin	kanze		
		amimiwal	kúr̃úƙúllìì		
Hepsetus odoe	African pike	njig duwaŋ		kiribuni	No
Labeo coubie	African carp				No
Synodontis spp.	catfish		ƙùrúngùù		No
Citharinus citharus, Citharinus latus	lutefish	kalafan	báánàà	palewal	No
Hemichromis bimaculatus, Hemichromis fasciatus	jewelfish		bakar		
Heterotis niloticus	bonytongue	ufdakon, ebugancen	bárgìì	baya	Yes
Mormyrus macrophthalmus		patima kururun	burar buzu		
Labeo senegalensis	African carp	gadabdan	búrdòò	bəskəm	No
Marcusenius ihyuysi		gulen	dagari	lamsa	Yes
Epiplatys spp., Aplocheilichthys spp.	killifish/panchax, toothed carp	ak dakwan	dankya, akunu		
Barbus spp.		buk zәmәn	digila, bakin burdo	bəskəm, cilim	only seen near Geidam
Brycinus leuciscus	African tetras	wasan	dindukuri	mәɗi	No
Oreochromis aureus (formerly Tilapia aurea)	tilapia	kafakun	duguru	kawowo	Yes
Parachanna obscura	snakehead	mudugun	dúmnóó	dumno	No
Clarias submarginatus	catfish		dundin		
Clarotes sp. ?	?		dùrùdúrùù		
Labeo sp.	African carp		ɗán dáátàà		
Citharinus citharus, Citharinus latus	lutefish		fàlfàl	fálfàl	
Sarotherodon galilaeus (formerly Tilapia galilaea)	tilapia	kafakun heta	fárín wala	holo	Yes
Protopterus annectens	lungfish	ambun	gáìwáá	ambu	Yes
Heterobranchus bidorsalis		mәsan	gara raka (?)	?	
Polypterus spp.	bichir fish	awiɗon	gàrgázáá, garza	bàràkádí	No
Lates niloticus	Nile perch	kaɓәlin	gííwár̃ rúwááɓáríyàà	ɓariya	No
Mormyrus isidori	?		hààlàɓà		
Clarias sp.	catfish	aalan	jàríí	ari	Yes
Brycinus macrolepidotus	African tetras	?	kándáurákàà	?	No
Ichthyborus besse	? but cf. 'otter'		kàren rúwáá		
Tilapia spp.	tilapia	ɗiɗikir	kárfásáá		Yes
Distichodus spp.	grasseater	kaskasan	káwsàà cihaki		
Tetraodon fahaka	pufferfish	kuɗiɗin mәfkәtәn, məkfətən	kómbání	kube	No
Dasyatis garouaensis	dotted ray	wurjik duwan	kunaman rúwáá		
Mormyrus rume	elephantsnout fish, trunkfish		lámsàà		
Parailia pellucida		kalapar	lapar	lapar	Yes
Schilbe spp.	butter catfish	ganun	lûlúú mai kaya	lulu	
Chrysichthys sp.			mai barewa		
Tilapia zilii	tilapia	kafakun suk jijin	mai gidan gaci karfasa shuri	kawowo	Yes
Heterobranchus spp.		?	mài leemu	?	
Malapterurus electricus	electric catfish	mjaŋ, njan	mínjíryáá	muu	Yes
Bagrus filamentosus	silver catfish		mumfal [?]		
Bagrus bayad, Bagrus docmak	silver catfish	masamanin	múskòò	mazambale	Yes
Marcusenius cyprinoides		takɗo	paya	paya	No
Alestes baremoze	African tetras	zantarin saaron	sááróó	saraŋ	No
Oreochromis niloticus (formerly Tilapia nilotica)	tilapia	andalon	sakiya	kawowo	Yes
Mormyrus sp.			sááwáyàà		
Siluranodon auritus		?	sháŋsháŋ (given as Synodontis sp. in other sources)	?	
Clarias sp.	catfish	mәsan	tárwáɗáá	bigiri	Yes
Marcusenius abadii		kurinyin	táátàr̃	lamsa	Yes
Campylomormyrus tamandua		tәrwәn, sawayen	tola, kánzáyíí	tólà, sawaya	Yes
Hydrocynus vittatus	tigerfish	dlayad, dleyal, jik duwan	tságíí	jay	No
Brycinus nurse	African tetras	zharwon, saron	ƙááwàráá	deda	No
Chrysichthys nigrodigitatus, Chrysichthys auratus		dumdumi, gajakan	ƙàrááyáá	ŋgaya	Yes
Auchenoglanis occidentalis, Auchenoglanis biscutatus	catfish	kazhakat	yàuníí	ŋgaya	Yes
Gymnarchus niloticus		mәzәman	zááwàà	kaaz	No

== Writing system ==
The Bade language uses a Latin script writing script.

Bade alphabet
Ə	A	B	Ɓ	C	D	Ɗ	E	F	G	H	I	J	Jl	K	L	M	N	Ŋ	O	P	R	R̃	S	T	Tl	U	V	W	Y	ʼY	Z
ə	a	b	ɓ	c	d	ɗ	e	f	g	h	i	j	jl	k	l	m	n	ŋ	o	p	r	r̃	s	t	tl	u	v	w	y	ʼy	z

The letter R̃ is only used in the Gashua dialect.
