= Ngizim =

Ngizim may refer to:

- Ngizim people
- Ngizim language
