= Citharinus eburneensis =

Conservation status
- Least Concern (IUCN 3.1)

Scientific classification
- Kingdom: Animalia
- Phylum: Chordata
- Class: Actinopterygii
- Order: Characiformes
- Family: Citharinidae
- Genus: Citharinus
- Species: C. eburneensis

Binomial name
- Citharinus eburneensis Daget, 1962

Species of fish

Citharinus eburneensis is a species of lutefish from tropical Africa. It is known from the coastal rivers of Côte d'Ivoire and can get as large as 17.5 cm.
