= Ngizim people =

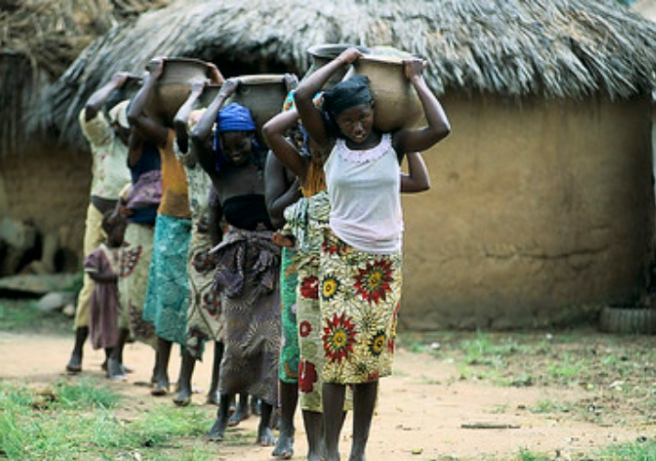
Ngizim tribe traditional dress

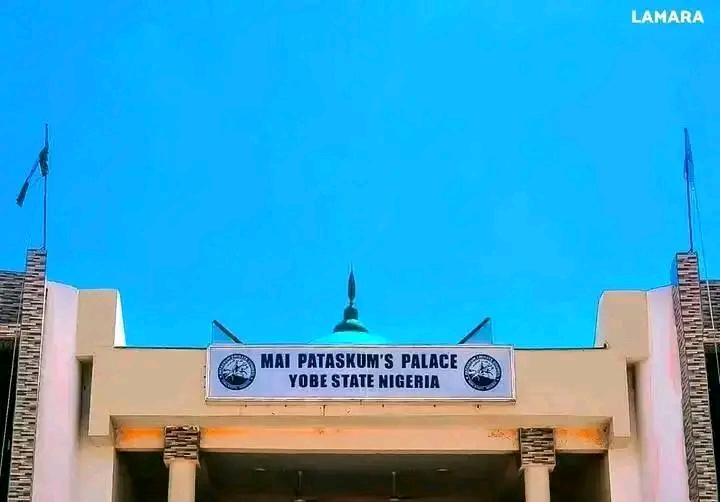
pataskum Emirate

The Ngizim people (Ngizmawa, Ngezzim, Ngijim, Ngujam, Ngazar, Nkazzar, Ngisam) live in Yobe State, northeastern Nigeria. As of 1993, there were an estimated 100,000 Ngizim. The tribe live primarily in Potiskum, the largest city in Yobe State and originally a Ngizim town, as well as the areas to the east and south of the city. Ngizim populations once inhabited parts of Borno and Jigawa States, but have since lost their cultural identity after being assimilated into other ethnic groups. The Ngizim speak a Chadic language also called Ngizim.

== History ==
Before the Fulani Jihad of 1804, the history of the Ngizim people was closely linked with that of the Bornu Empire. By 1472, when the capital of the Bornu Empire, Birni Ngazargamu, was established, the Ngizim had gained a reputation as formidable warriors. As they consolidated their influence over parts of modern-day Yobe State, their cultural capital Potiskum became a regional center. During the early part of the 20th century, the Ngizim rebelled against the Fika Emirate, which had been given political control over them by the colonial authorities. The local British district officer lead forces against the Ngizim; Mai Agudum, the rebel leader, was later executed. The Ngizim emirate was not restored until 1993 when Mai Muhammadu Atiyaye was appointed by the state governor Alhaji Bukar Abba Ibrahim . The current Ngizim leader, Mai Umaru Bubaram Ibn Wuriwa Bauya was recently upgraded to the status of a first-class Emir by former Governor Bukar Abba Ibrahim.

In his notes on the "History of the first twelve years of the reign of Mai Idris Alooma (1571–1583) by Imam Ahmad Ibn Furtua", H. R. Palmer informs us about the word Ngizim. "There are various forms of this name which though they are distinguished seem to denote the same people — N'gizim, N'gujam, N'gazar, N'Kazzar, N'gissam". In another part of the notes, he tells us that Birni N'gazargamu was founded by Mai Ali Ghaji Dunamani in about 1462, who acquired the site from the "So" who lived in the region. "The name of the capital is correctly spelled as N'gazargamu or N'gasarkumu. The first part of the word signifies that the previous inhabitants of the region where N'gazar or N'gizim. The later part of the word "Gamu" or "Kumu" is the same as the first part of the word "Gwombe" and means either (i) chief or King or (ii) ancestral spirit." Going by the scattered references to the N'gizim one would at best only guess the extent of their spread in the Western Sudan. There is reference to N'gizim and then the tribe of N'gizim in the west of the empire known as the Binawa. Binawa is also known as Mabani who extended from Bursari region west of Birni Gazargamu to Katagum.

== Early Kanem-Bornu history ==
There are various references to Ngizim people in Kanem-Bornu history as early as the days of the Kanem civil wars in 1396. It can be said that the Ngizim people have played a considerable role in moving the capital of the empire from Njimi to N'gazargamu. Quoting H. R. Palmer:

"... other clans of the Kayi (Zaghawa) came down to the region of lake Fittri from Wadai, but evidently that took place after 1259 A.D. It is the fusion of these new clans of Kayi with the inhabitants of the Fittri region (called in the tradition Ngizim) which gave rise to a separate political entity which arose in the Fittri region about 1350 A.D. and was called Bulala".

From another source, we find a reference to the Ngizim being one of the earliest groups to migrate from Kanem:

"According to Bornu traditions, the Bade and the related Ngizim of Potiskum – who today comprise of the emirate of Bedde – were the first people to migrate from Kanem round the north side of Lake Chad and reach the Komadugu Yobe, at the time when the So were still the dominant power in Bornu".

== Language ==
Ngizim is one of five Chadic languages indigenous to Yobe State, the others being Bade, Bole, Karekare, and Ngamo. Ngizim is a member of the West Branch of Chadic and is hence related to Hausa, the dominant language throughout northern Nigeria. Ngizim's closest linguistic relatives are Bade, spoken north of Potiskum in Bade (Bedde) Emirate, and Duwai, spoken east of Gashua. Unlike some of the other languages in Yobe State, Ngizim has very little dialect variation.

== Traditional leaders ==
The traditional ruler of the Ngizim people is the Mai Potiskum, whose stool is located in Potiskum. Like most traditional rulers in northern Nigeria, Mai Potiskum is also the foremost Islamic leader among his people.

== Potiskum town ==
Concerning their more recent history, during the period of the Fulani Jihad specifically in 1808, a group of N'gizim under the leadership of Bauya left Mugni as a result of an attack on Birni N'gazargamu by the Fulani Jihadists. They took a south course to the Kaisala area. On arrival, Bauya and his group helped the inhabitants of Kaisala repulse an attack on them by the N'gazar (branch of Ngizim) of Daura (Dawura). After a counter-attack on Daura and its conquest, Bauya founded his own section of settlement and called it "Pataskum" which was corrupted by Europeans to "Potiskum". The word "Pataskum" is an Ngizim phrase meaning forest of "Skum" trees. "Pata" meaning forest in the Ngizim language and "Skum" is a type of tree found abundantly in the area at the time of founding Potiskum town.

== Notable people ==
- Kursu Bin Harun (Grand Vizier of Borno empire during the reign of Mai Idris Alooma)
- Nasr Bultu (Mediator between western Ngizims and the Mai Idris Alooma's government)
- Umaru Bubaram Ibn Wuriwa Bauya (Mai Potiskum)
- Mamman Bello Ali (Governor of Yobe State from 29 May 2007 died on 27 January 2009)
