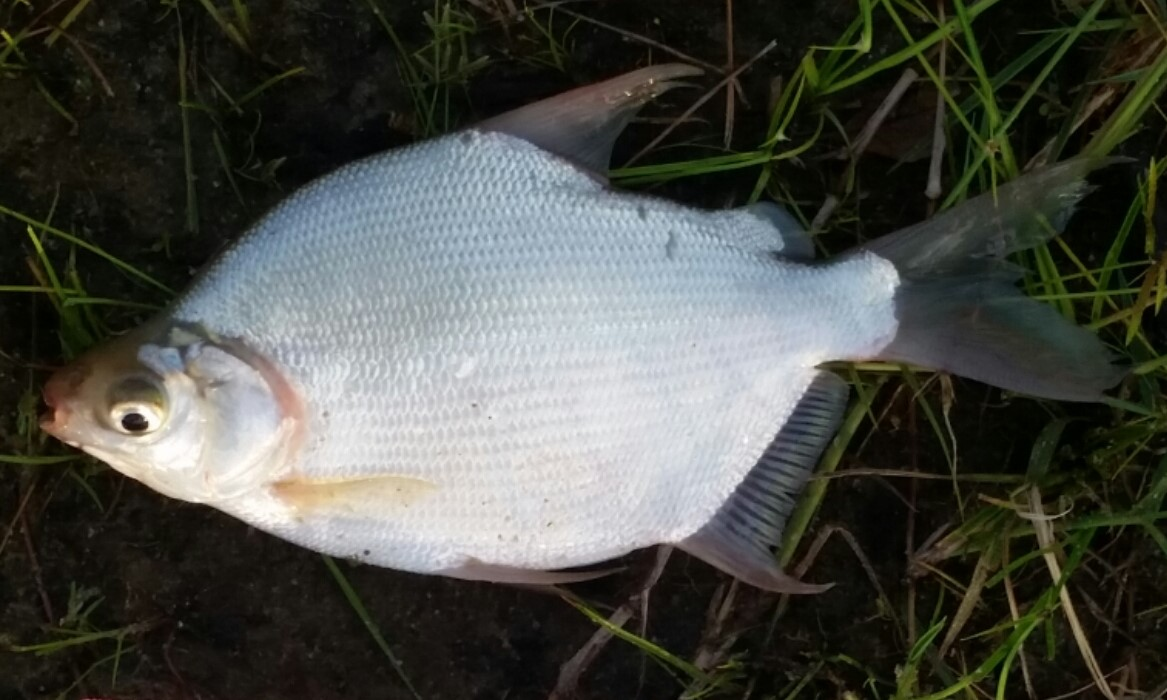

Conservation status
- Least Concern (IUCN 3.1)

Scientific classification
- Kingdom: Animalia
- Phylum: Chordata
- Class: Actinopterygii
- Order: Characiformes
- Family: Citharinidae
- Genus: Citharinus
- Species: C. congicus

Binomial name
- Citharinus congicus Boulenger, 1897

= Citharinus congicus =

Species of fish

Citharinus congicus is a species of freshwater ray-finned fish belonging to the family Citharinidae, the lutefishes. This species is found in tropical Africa.

== Description ==
Citharinus congicus reaches a standard length of 43 cm.

== Distribution ==
The species is found in Africa. It is present in the Congo basin from the lower Congo to Lake Upemba in the Democratic Republic of the Congo and the Republic of Congo, as well as in the Rufiji-Ruaha in Tanzania.
