= Citharinus macrolepis =

Conservation status
- Least Concern (IUCN 3.1)

Scientific classification
- Kingdom: Animalia
- Phylum: Chordata
- Class: Actinopterygii
- Order: Characiformes
- Family: Citharinidae
- Genus: Citharinus
- Species: C. macrolepis

Binomial name
- Citharinus macrolepis Boulenger, 1899

Species of fish

Citharinus macrolepis is a species of lutefish in the family Citharinidae. It is found in tropical Africa, where it is very widespread in the Congo River basin.

== Description ==
Citharinus macrolepis reaches a standard length of 75 cm.
