= Citharinus gibbosus =

Conservation status
- Least Concern (IUCN 3.1)

Scientific classification
- Kingdom: Animalia
- Phylum: Chordata
- Class: Actinopterygii
- Order: Characiformes
- Family: Citharinidae
- Genus: Citharinus
- Species: C. gibbosus

Binomial name
- Citharinus gibbosus Boulenger, 1899

Species of fish

Citharinus gibbosus is a species of lutefish found in tropical Africa.

== Description ==
Citharinus gibbosus reaches a standard length of 61 cm.

== Distribution ==
Found in Africa. Very widespread in the Congo River basin, from the lower Congo up to the Lufira. It is absent from the Luapula-Moero and southern Kasaï. It is also known in Lake Tanganyika and the Malagarasi.
