= Teshenawa language =

Extinct Afro-Asiatic language of Nigeria

Teshenawa
- Teshenanchi
- Native to: Nigeria
- Region: Jigawa State
- Extinct: after 1927
- Language family: Afro-Asiatic: Chadic; West Chadic; Bade–Warji; Bade (B.1); Teshenawa

Language codes
- ISO 639-3: twc
- Glottolog: tesh1239

Teshenawa (Teshenanchi) is an extinct Afro-Asiatic language formerly spoken in Teshena town of Kafin Hausa LGA, Jigawa State, Nigeria. It was closely related to the also-extinct Auyokawa and still-living Bade.
