= Citharidium =

Conservation status
- Data Deficient (IUCN 3.1)

Scientific classification
- Kingdom: Animalia
- Phylum: Chordata
- Class: Actinopterygii
- Order: Characiformes
- Family: Citharinidae
- Genus: Citharidium; Boulenger, 1902
- Species: C. ansorgii

Binomial name
- Citharidium ansorgii Boulenger, 1902

Species of fish

Citharidium is a monospecific genus of freshwater ray-finned fish belonging to the family Citharinidae, the lutefishes. The only species in this genus is Citharidium ansorgii which is found in the Niger River basin in Nigeria. They reportedly may also be found in Cameroon. Its conservation status is of the least concern. The only known threats which could negatively affect the population of this species are oil studies in the Lower Delta and potential impact of the invasive water hyacinth in the inland delta.

The average length of unsexed males is about 58.6 cm (23.1 in). The heaviest recorded specimen of this species weighed 9.1 kg (20 lb).

Citharidium ansorgii can be found in fresh water at demersal water depths, in tropical climates. This species is known for migrating upstream for spawning.

The species is named in honor of explorer William John Ansorge (1850-1913), who collected the specimen type.
