= Bauerius =

Conservation status
- Least Concern (IUCN 3.1)

Scientific classification
- Kingdom: Animalia
- Phylum: Chordata
- Class: Reptilia
- Order: Squamata
- Suborder: Gekkota
- Family: Gekkonidae
- Genus: Bauerius; Lobon-Rovira, Conradie, Vaz Pinto, Keates, Edwards, du Plessis, & Branch, 2022
- Species: B. ansorgii

Binomial name
- Bauerius ansorgii (Boulenger, 1907)

Synonyms
- Phyllodactylus ansorgii — Boulenger, 1907; Afrogecko ansorgii — Bauer et al., 1997

Species of lizard

Bauerius ansorgii is a species of gecko, a lizard in the family Gekkonidae. The species is indigenous to the west coast of Southern Africa.

== Etymology ==
The specific name, ansorgii, is in honor of William John Ansorge, a physician who collected natural history specimens in Africa.

== Geographic range ==
B. ansorgii is endemic to Angola.

== Habitat ==
The preferred natural habitats of B. ansorgii are savanna and shrubland, at altitudes of 50–500 m (160–1,640 ft).

== Description ==
B. ansorgii may attain a snout-to-vent length (SVL) of 7.5 cm (3.0 in), with a tail 3 cm (1.2 in) long. Dorsally, it is pale grayish brown. Ventrally, it is white with small brown spots. The upper lip is also white.

== Behavior ==
B. ansorgii is nocturnal. It shelters by day in hollow branches of blackthorn (Senegalia mellifera), the branches having been made hollow by termite activity. It emerges at night to forage.

== Reproduction ==
B. ansorgii is oviparous.
