= Bade languages =

Bade
- B.1 West Chadic
- Geographic distribution: Borno State and Jigawa State, Nigeria
- Linguistic classification: Afro-Asiatic: Chadic; West Chadic; Bade

Language codes
- Glottolog: west2710
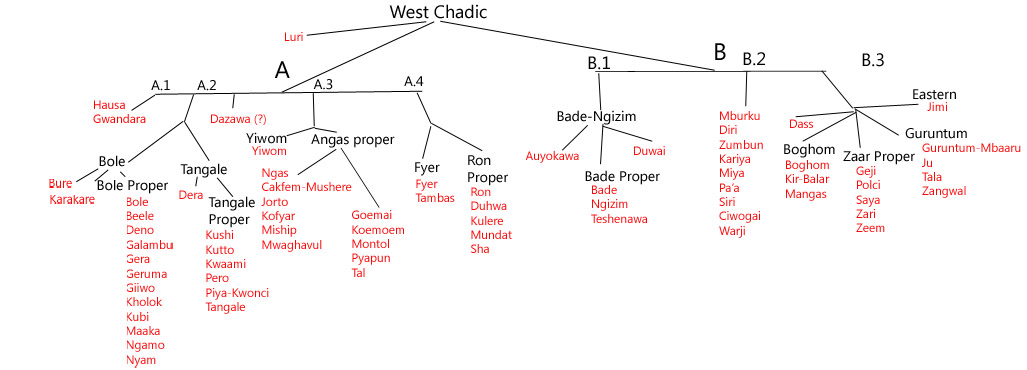
- West Chadic per Newman (1977)

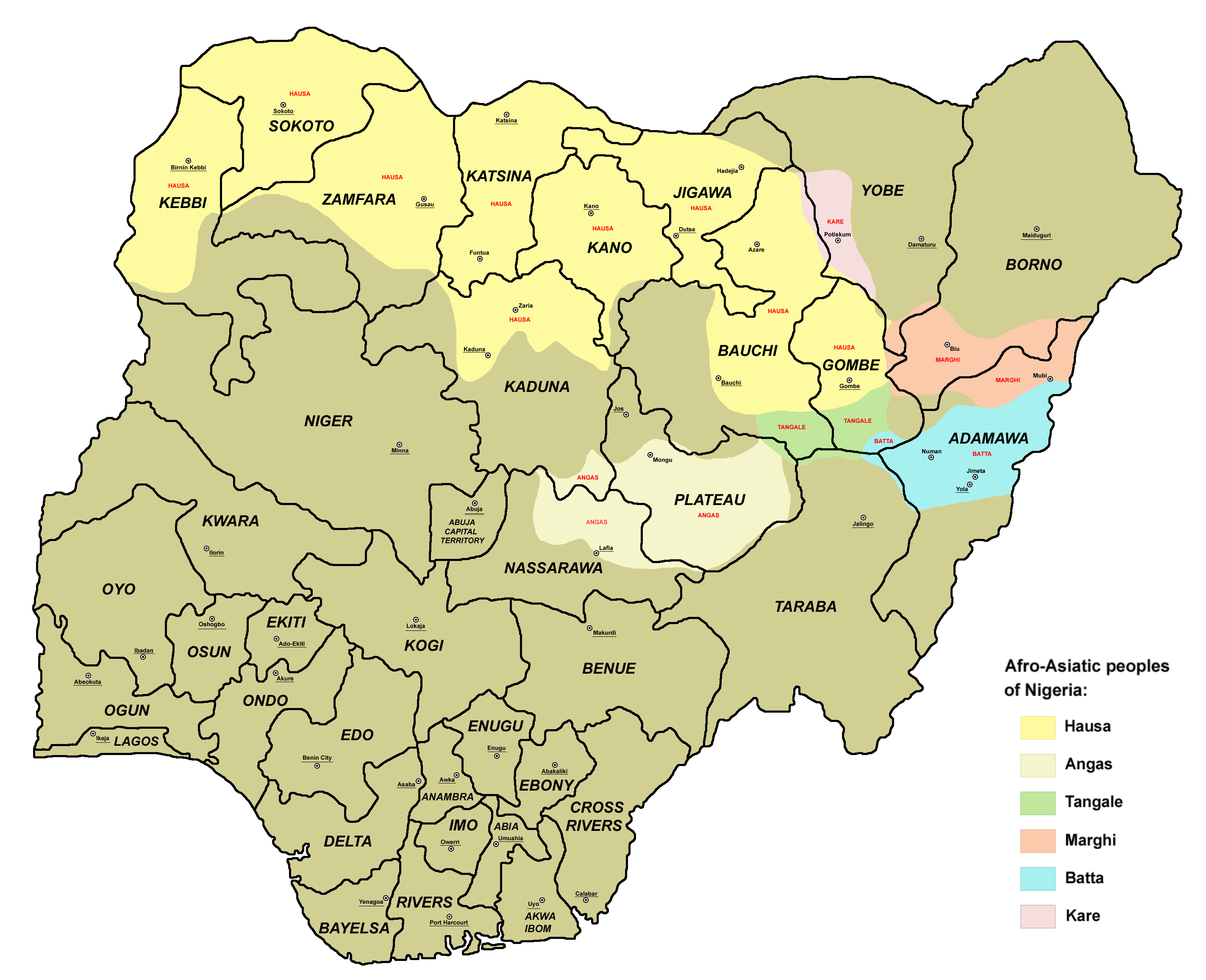
Main Chadic-speaking peoples in Nigeria

The Bade languages (also known as B.1 West Chadic or the Bade–Ngizim languages) are a branch of West Chadic languages that are spoken in Borno State and Jigawa State of northern Nigeria. Bade is the most widely spoken language with 250,000 speakers, followed by Ngizim with 80,000 speakers. Many Bade languages, such as Shirawa, Teshenawa, and Auyokawa, are extinct.

== Languages ==
Below is a comprehensive list of Bade language names, populations, and locations from Blench (2019).

Language	Cluster	Dialects	Alternate spellings	Own name for language	Endonym(s)	Other names (based on location)	Other names for language	Exonym(s)	Speakers	Location(s)
Auyokawa (extinct)										Jigawa State, Kafin Hausa LGA, Auyo
Shira (extinct)			Shirawa							Shira town, Jigawa State, Kafin Hausa LGA; extinct
Teshena (extinct)			Teshenawa							Teshena town, Jigawa State, Kafin Hausa LGA; extinct
Bade		Western Bade (Magwaram, Maagwaram), Southern Bade (Bade k-Aɗo), Gashua Bade (Mazgarwa)	Bedde				Gidgid		31,933 (1952 W&B) includes Duwai and Ngizim; 100,000 (1973 SIL)	Borno State, Bade LGA; Jigawa State, Hadejia LGA
Ɗuwai			Duwai		Lvji		Eastern Bade			Borno State, Bade LGA
Ngizim			Ngezzim						39,200 includes Bade and Ɗuwai (1952 W&B); 25,000 Schuh (1972)	Borno State, Damaturu LGA
