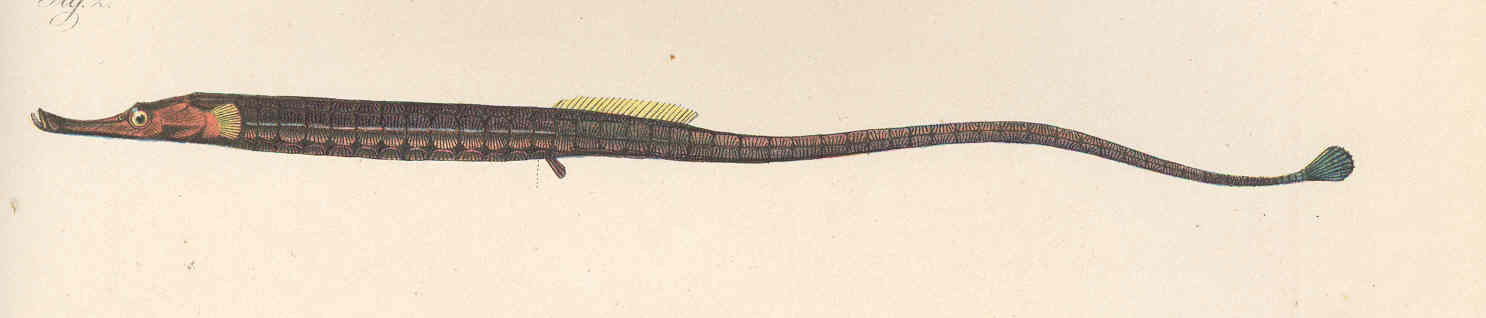

Scientific classification
- Kingdom: Animalia
- Phylum: Chordata
- Class: Actinopterygii
- Order: Syngnathiformes
- Family: Syngnathidae
- Subfamily: Syngnathinae
- Genus: Enneacampus; C. E. Dawson, 1981

Type species
- Syngnathus ansorgii Boulenger, 1910

= Enneacampus =

Genus of fishes

Enneacampus is a genus of freshwater pipefishes native to Africa.

== Etymology ==
The genus name comes from the Greek ennea meaning "nine times" and kampe meaning "curvature."

== Species ==
There are currently two recognized species in this genus:

- Enneacampus ansorgii (Boulenger, 1910)
- Enneacampus kaupi (Bleeker, 1863)
