= Enteromius ansorgii =

Conservation status
- Least Concern (IUCN 3.1)

Scientific classification
- Kingdom: Animalia
- Phylum: Chordata
- Class: Actinopterygii
- Order: Cypriniformes
- Family: Cyprinidae
- Subfamily: Smiliogastrinae
- Genus: Enteromius
- Species: E. ansorgii

Binomial name
- Enteromius ansorgii (Boulenger, 1904)

Synonyms
- Barbus ansorgii Boulenger, 1904

Species of fish

Enteromius ansorgii is a species of ray-finned fish in the genus Enteromius. It is endemic to Angola.

== Etymology ==
The fish is named in honor of explorer William John Ansorge (1850-1913), who collected the type specimen.
