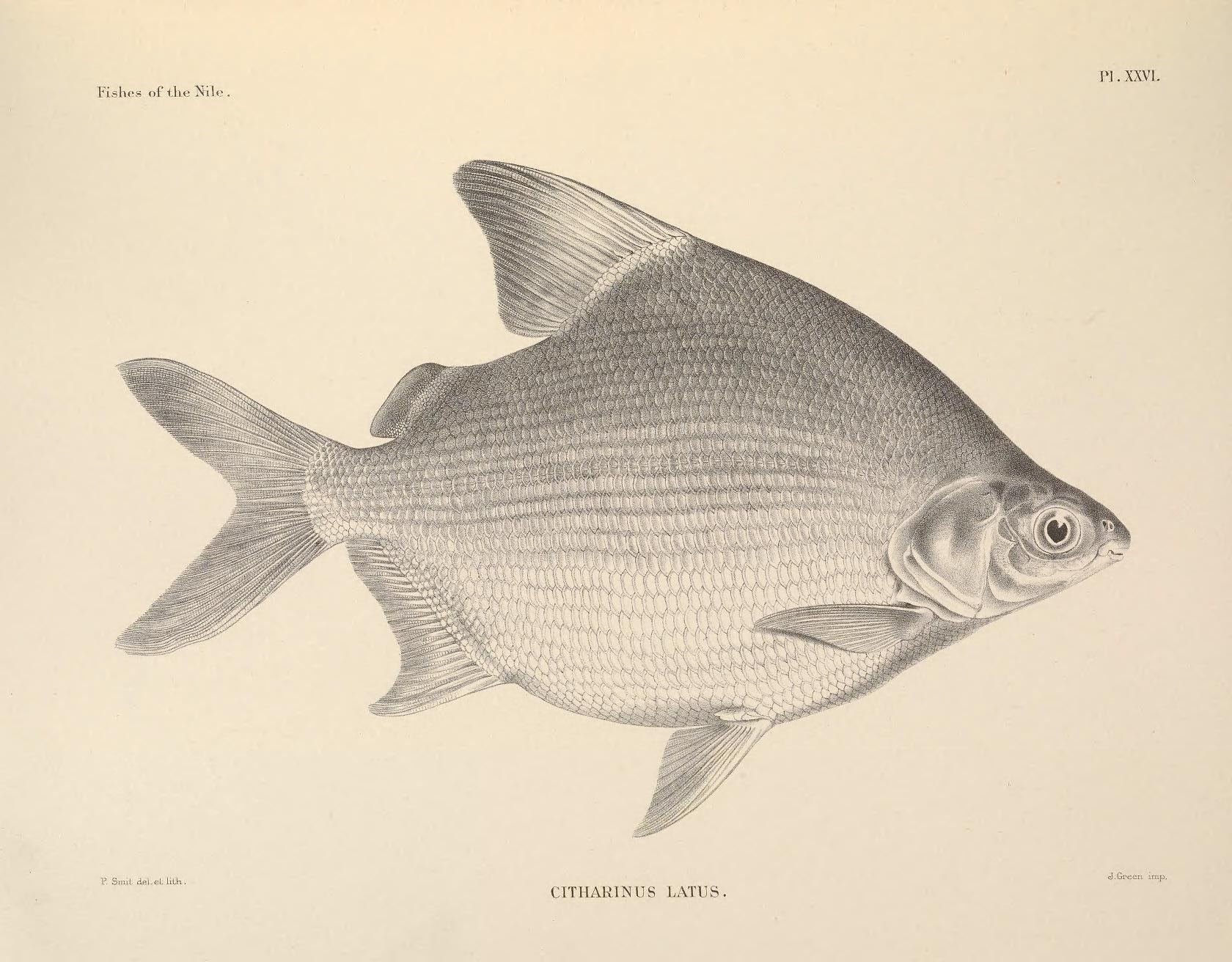
- Citharinus latus

Scientific classification
- Kingdom: Animalia
- Phylum: Chordata
- Class: Actinopterygii
- Order: Characiformes
- Family: Citharinidae
- Genus: Citharinus; G. Cuvier, 1817

Type species
- Serrasalmus citharus Geoffroy St. Hilaire, 1809

Synonyms
- Citharinoides Daget, 1962

= Citharinus =

Genus of fishes

Citharinus is a genus of freshwater ray-finned fishes belonging to the family Citharinidae, the lutefishes. The fishes in this genus are found in tropical Africa.

== Species ==
Citharinus contains the following species:

- Citharinus citharus (Geoffroy St. Hilaire, 1809) (Moonfish)
- Citharinus congicus Boulenger, 1897
- Citharinus eburneensis Daget, 1962
- Citharinus gibbosus Boulenger, 1899
- Citharinus latus Müller & Troschel, 1844
- Citharinus macrolepis Boulenger, 1899
