= P. ansorgii =

P. ansorgii may refer to:

- Phractolaemus ansorgii, commonly called hingemouth, a small freshwater fish species found in west central Africa
- Polypterus ansorgii, commonly called Guinean Bichir, a bony fish species found off of the coast of West Africa

== See also ==
- Ansorgii
