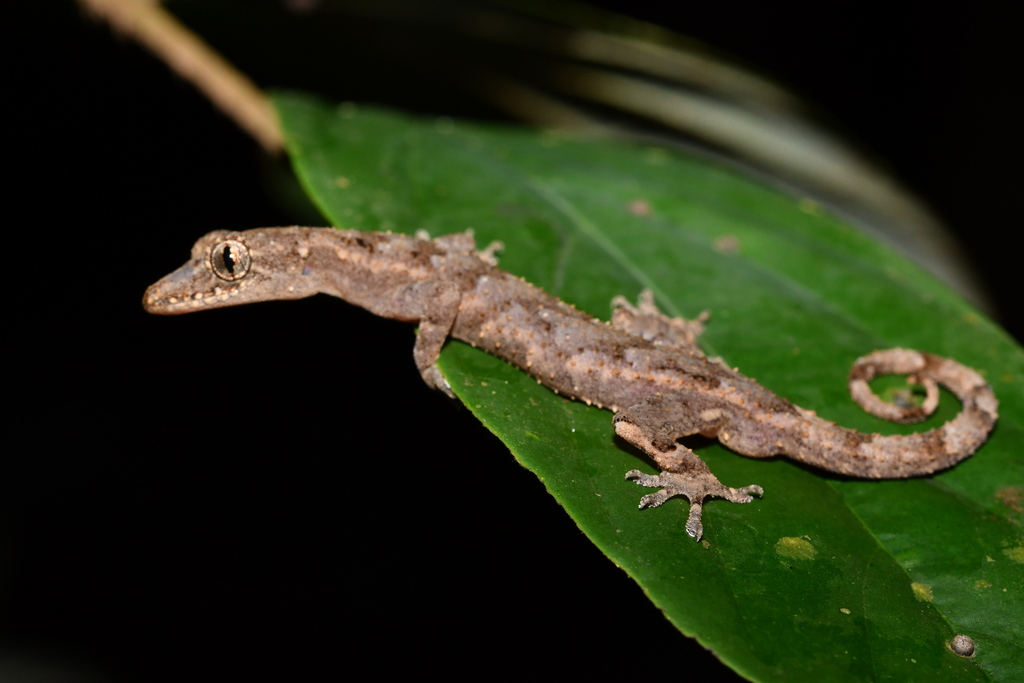

Conservation status
- Least Concern (IUCN 3.1)

Scientific classification
- Kingdom: Animalia
- Phylum: Chordata
- Class: Reptilia
- Order: Squamata
- Suborder: Gekkota
- Family: Gekkonidae
- Genus: Hemidactylus
- Species: H. ansorgii

Binomial name
- Hemidactylus ansorgii Boulenger, 1901

Synonyms
- Hemidactylus ansorgii Boulenger, 1901; Hemidactylus ansorgei [sic] Ullenbruch et al., 2010 (ex errore); Hemidactylus ansorgii — J. Dehling & D. Dehling, 2012

= Nigeria leaf-toed gecko =

Species of lizard

The Nigeria leaf-toed gecko (Hemidactylus ansorgii) is a species of lizard in the family Gekkonidae. The species is native to western Africa.

== Etymology ==
The specific name, ansorgii, is in honor of William John Ansorge, a physician who collected natural history specimens in Africa.

== Geographic range ==
H. ansorgii is found in Benin, Cameroon, Ghana, Ivory Coast, Liberia, Nigeria, and Togo.

== Habitat ==
The preferred natural habitat of H. ansorgii is forest, at altitudes from sea level to 1,480 m (4,860 ft), and it has also been found in teak plantations.

== Diet ==
H. ansorgii preys upon insects and spiders.

== Reproduction ==
H. ansorgii is oviparous.
