= Enneacampus ansorgii =

Conservation status
- Least Concern (IUCN 3.1)

Scientific classification
- Domain: Eukaryota
- Kingdom: Animalia
- Phylum: Chordata
- Class: Actinopterygii
- Order: Syngnathiformes
- Family: Syngnathidae
- Genus: Enneacampus
- Species: E. ansorgii

Binomial name
- Enneacampus ansorgii (Boulenger, 1910)

Synonyms
- Syngnathus ansorgii Boulenger, 1910; Syngnathus pulchellus Boulenger, 1915; Syngnathus olssoni Johnels, 1954

Species of fish

Enneacampus ansorgii, the African freshwater pipefish, is a pipefish in the family Syngnathidae (pipefishes and seahorses). It is widely distributed in coastal rivers and streams of Western Africa, being found in both slow and fast flowing water from the Gambia River to the Cuanza River in Angola. It is most likely that the specific name honours the explorer William John Ansorge (1850–1913).
