= Auyokawa language =

Extinct Afro-Asiatic language

Auyokawa
- Tirio
- Native to: Nigeria
- Region: Jigawa State
- Era: attested 1924
- Language family: Afro-Asiatic: Chadic; West Chadic; Bade–Warji; Bade (B.1); Auyo–Teshena; Auyokawa

Language codes
- ISO 639-3: auo
- Glottolog: auyo1240
- Linguasphere: 19-DAD(-aa)

Auyokawa (Auyo), also known as Tirio, is an extinct Afro-Asiatic language formerly spoken in Auyo LGA, Jigawa State, Nigeria. It is known primarily from a list of numbers, the names of the days of the week, and a phrase.

The Auyokawa / Auyakawa people are also found in the ancient town of Gwaram in Gwaram LGA, Jigawa State, Nigeria. They migrated to this region following the formation of the Hadejia Emirate when the Fulani Jihad was at its peak.

After their arrival, the Auyokawa people found that the region was already inhabited by the ancient Warji tribe, along with a Fulani scholar, Malam Lawan Dan Ishaq and his brother Auwal Dan Ishaq. Malam Lawan was a student of Shehu Usman Dan Fodio and was among the founders of the Bauchi Emirate, before he later migrated to the Gwaram area.
