= William John Ansorge =

Physician and zoologist (1850–1913)

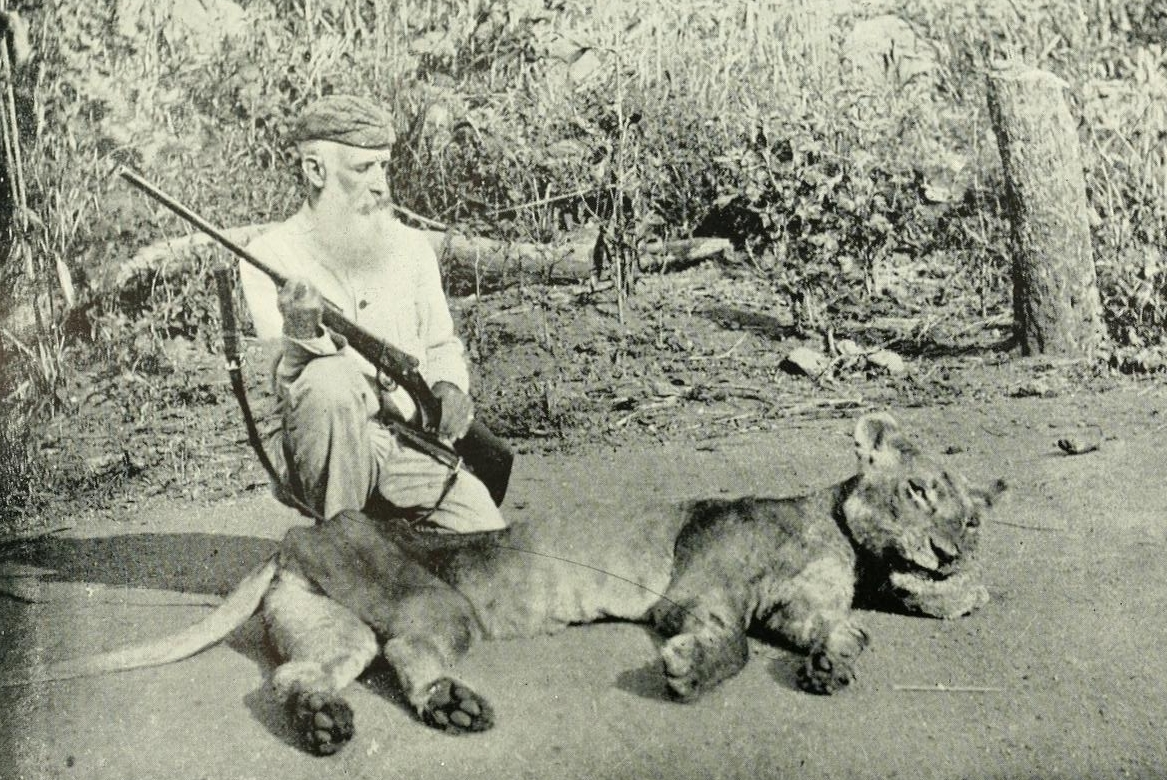
- W.J. Ansorge with a lion in Africa
- Born: 6 April 1850; 31 October 1913 (aged 63)
- Died: Luanda, Angola
- Scientific career
- Fields: Zoology

William John Ansorge (6 April 1850 – 31 October 1913 at Luanda) was a physician who worked in Angola and Uganda and is known for exploring the fauna of the African region. A large number of species have been named after him based on the specimens that he collected and sent back to England.

== Life and work ==
Ansorge's ancestors came from Silesia, but William was born in Chapra, Bengal, to Rev. Paul Gotthold Ansorge (who worked in Krishnaghar, Bengal, and later at Mauritius, preaching in Bengali and Hindi in India) in 1850 and studied at the Royal College in Mauritius and then at Pembroke College, Cambridge. He worked briefly at St Bartholomew's Hospital in London. He then became a professor at the Royal College in Mauritius (1872–1880) and senior professor from 1880 to 1886. He was posted as a medical officer in Uganda from 1895 to 1898. He was also District Medical Officer in Uganda and Southern Nigeria. He travelled across Africa (northern Angola, Benguella, Mossamedes, Portuguese Guinea) and wrote Under the African Sun in 1899. Ernst Hartert noted that Ansorge was a very valuable collector and contributor to the bird collection of Walter Rothschild at Tring. Hartert noted that Ansorge's knowledge of the species collected was limited and that he lacked training in zoology. His early collections made from 1892 in Uganda were of poor quality after which he received training from Hartert. Hartert notes that he died in Luanda, Angola at just 64, although appearing much older with his white beard.

Ansorge married Mary Matilda, daughter of G.E. Ely of Edinburgh, in 1881. They had two sons (one being the amateur entomologist Sir Eric Cecil Ansorge) and a daughter. He received two medals with clasps for his service in Uganda 1897–1898 and for his role in the Aro Expedition of 1901–1902.

== Taxon named in his honor ==
Many species of animals were named after Ansorge. Many by museum taxonomists chiefly in Britain.

Mammals

- The mongoose Ansorge's cusimanse (Crossarchus ansorgei)

Birds

- Ansorge's greenbul (Andropadus ansorgei)
- Platysteira (concreta) ansorgei
- Xenocopsychus ansorgei, and
- Nesocharis ansorgei.

Fishes

- the Guinean bichir Polypterus ansorgii,
- the Rainbow Ctenopoma Microctenopoma ansorgii (Boulenger 1912),
- the African whiptailed catfish Phractura ansorgii,
- the cichlid Thysochromis ansorgii,
- the African freshwater pipefish Enneacampus ansorgii (Boulenger 1910),
- the Tetra Nannopetersius ansorgii (Boulenger 1910)
- Alestes ansorgii Boulenger 1910
- Citharidium ansorgii Boulenger 1902,
- Nannocharax ansorgii Boulenger 1911 ,
- Labeo ansorgii Boulenger 1907,
- Labeobarbus ansorgii (Boulenger 1906),
- Enteromius ansorgii (Boulenger 1904),
- The Agberi mormyrid, Petrocephalus ansorgii Boulenger, 1903, is a species of electric fish in the family Mormyridae, found in Africa: on the Upper and Lower Niger, the Bénuoé, and the coastal rivers of Nigeria.
- Raiamas ansorgii (Boulenger 1910),
- the eel Mastacembelus ansorgii Boulenger 1905
- the African Fish Neolebias ansorgii, and
- the killfish Epiplatys ansorgii (Boulenger 1911).

Reptiles

- Afrogecko ansorgii,
- Hemidactylus ansorgii, and
- Psammophis ansorgii.
