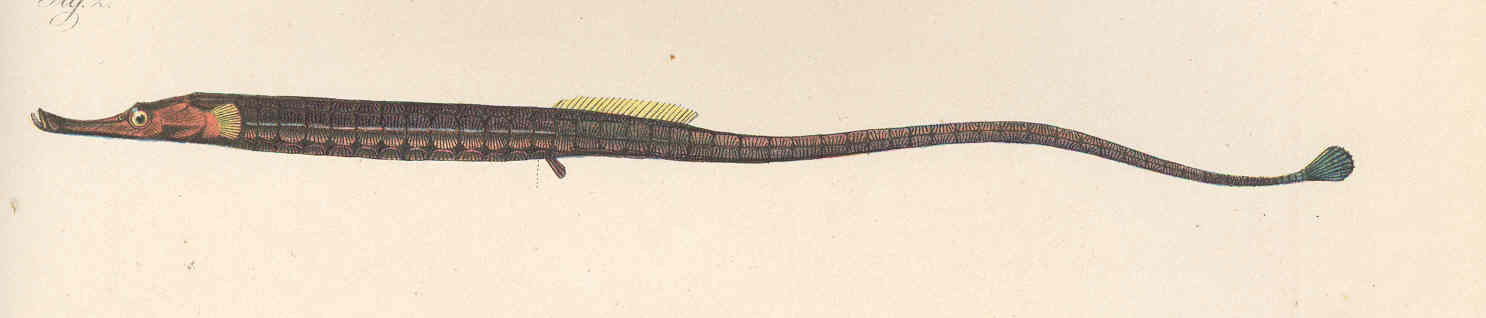

Conservation status
- Least Concern (IUCN 3.1)

Scientific classification
- Kingdom: Animalia
- Phylum: Chordata
- Class: Actinopterygii
- Order: Syngnathiformes
- Family: Syngnathidae
- Genus: Enneacampus
- Species: E. kaupi

Binomial name
- Enneacampus kaupi (Bleeker, 1863)

Synonyms
- Syngnathus kaupi Bleeker, 1863

= Enneacampus kaupi =

Species of fish

Enneacampus kaupi is a pipefish in the family Syngnathidae. It is found in Africa, from Liberia to the Congo River estuary. It lives in fresh and brackish water estuaries and streams where it is usually found among algae at depths of 10–13 m. Its IUCN status is Least Concern. Wild-caught members of this species can be found in the aquarium trade. The specific name honours the ichthyologist Johann Jakob Kaup.
