= Synodontis vermiculatus =

Conservation status
- Least Concern (IUCN 3.1)

Scientific classification
- Domain: Eukaryota
- Kingdom: Animalia
- Phylum: Chordata
- Class: Actinopterygii
- Order: Siluriformes
- Family: Mochokidae
- Genus: Synodontis
- Species: S. vermiculatus

Binomial name
- Synodontis vermiculatus Daget, 1954

Species of fish

Synodontis vermiculatus is a species of upside-down catfish native to the Niger basin of Guinea, Mali, Niger and Nigeria. This species grows to a length of 50 centimetres (20 in) SL.
