= Ɗuwai language =

Chadic language spoken in Nigeria

Ɗuwai
- Native to: Nigeria
- Region: Yobe State, Kano State
- Native speakers: (11,000 cited 2000)
- Language family: Afro-Asiatic: Chadic; West Chadic; Bade–Warji; Bade (B.1); Ɗuwai

Language codes
- ISO 639-3: dbp
- Glottolog: duwa1244

Ɗuwai (Dó:aí) is an Afro-Asiatic language spoken in Jigawa and Kano States, Nigeria.

== Writing System ==
Duwai alphabet
Ə	A	B	Ɓ	C	D	Ɗ	E	F	G	H	I	J	K	L	M	N	Ŋ	O	P	R	R̃	S	T	U	V	W	Y	ʼY	Z
ə	a	b	ɓ	c	d	ɗ	e	f	g	h	i	j	k	l	m	n	ŋ	o	p	r	r̃	s	t	u	v	w	y	ʼy	z
