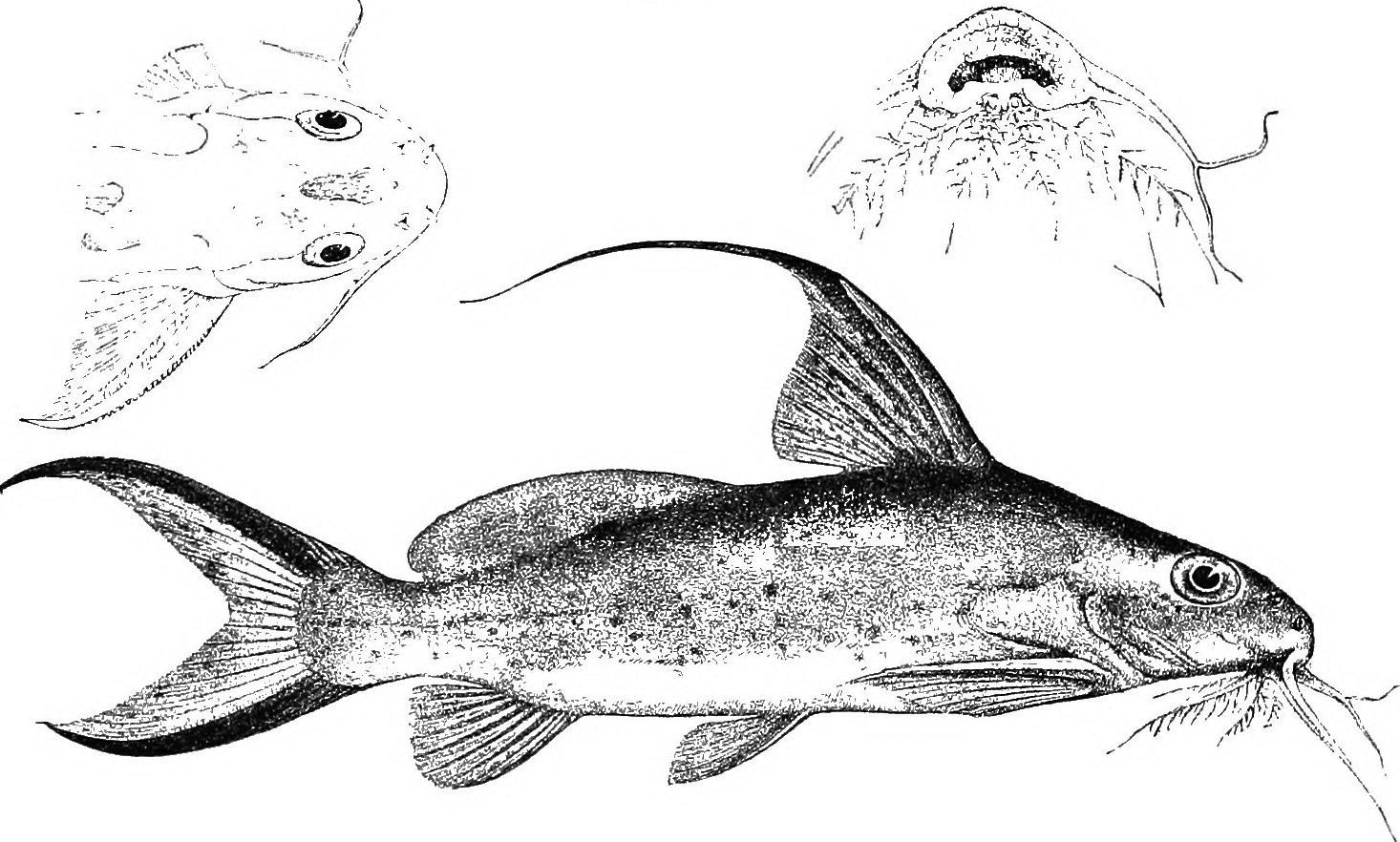

Conservation status
- Least Concern (IUCN 3.1)

Scientific classification
- Kingdom: Animalia
- Phylum: Chordata
- Class: Actinopterygii
- Order: Siluriformes
- Family: Mochokidae
- Genus: Synodontis
- Species: S. filamentosus

Binomial name
- Synodontis filamentosus Boulenger, 1901

= Synodontis filamentosus =

Species of fish

Synodontis filamentosus, known as the longfin synodontis, is a species of upside-down catfish that is native to the basins of the Nile, Volta and Niger Rivers as well as the Chad Basin. It was first described by British-Belgian zoologist George Albert Boulenger in 1901, from specimens obtained near the mouth of Lake No, on the White Nile in Sudan. The species name filamentosus comes from the elongated rays of the dorsal and caudal fins.

== Description ==
Like all members of the genus Synodontis, S. filamentosus has a strong, bony head capsule that extends back as far as the first spine of the dorsal fin. The head contains a distinct narrow, bony, external protrusion called a humeral process. The shape and size of the humeral process helps to identify the species. In S. filamentosus, the humeral process is flat, a little longer than it is broad, and rounded at the end.

The fish has three pairs of barbels. The maxillary barbels are on located on the upper jaw, and two pairs of mandibular barbels are on the lower jaw. The maxillary barbel is straight without any branches, with a broad membrane at the base. It extends about 4/5 the length of the head. The outer pair of mandibular barbels is about 1 1/2 as long as the inner pair, have long, slender branches with secondary branches.

The front edges of the dorsal fins and the pectoral fins of Syntontis species are hardened into stiff spines. In S. filamentosus, the spine is as long as the head, curved, smooth in the front and serrated on the back. The remaining portion of the dorsal fin is made up of seven branching rays, ending in a long elongated filament that is longer than the dorsal fin itself. The spine of the pectoral fin is as long as the dorsal spine, and serrated on both sides. The adipose fin is 4 1/2 times as long as it is deep. The anal fin contains four unbranched and seven branched rays, and is rounded. The tail, or caudal fin, is deeply forked, with the upper lobe longer.

All members of Syndontis have a structure called a premaxillary toothpad, which is located on the very front of the upper jaw of the mouth. This structure contains several rows of short, chisel-shaped teeth. In S. filamentosus, the toothpad forms a short, broad band. On the lower jaw, or mandible, the teeth of Syndontis are attached to flexible, stalk-like structures and described as "s-shaped" or "hooked". The number of teeth on the mandible is used to differentiate between species; in S. filamentosus, there are about 20 teeth on the mandible.

The color of the fish is greyish, with small, scattered dark spots, and whitish on the underside. The dorsal and caudal fins have small greyish spots. The lower borders of the caudal fin are black.

The maximum standard length of the species is 26 centimetres (10 in). Generally, females in the genus Synodontis tend to be slightly larger than males of the same age.

== Habitat and behavior ==
In the wild, the species widespread across central Africa, from Guinea to Ethiopia. The species is harvested for human consumption. The reproductive habits of most of the species of Synodontis are not known, beyond some instances of obtaining egg counts from gravid females. Spawning likely occurs during the flooding season between July and October, and pairs swim in unison during spawning. The growth rate is rapid in the first year, then slows down as the fish age.
