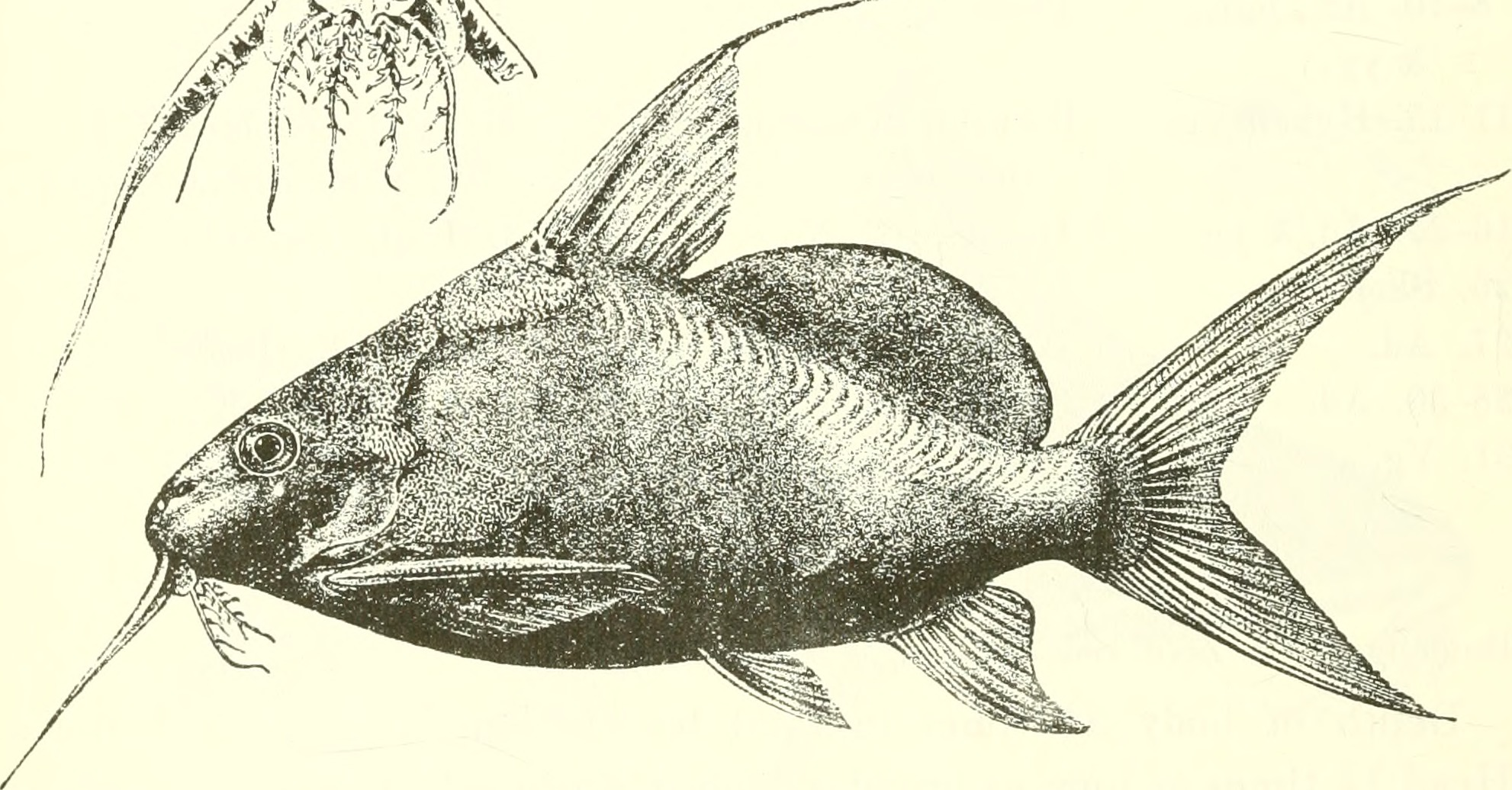

Conservation status
- Least Concern (IUCN 3.1)

Scientific classification
- Kingdom: Animalia
- Phylum: Chordata
- Class: Actinopterygii
- Order: Siluriformes
- Family: Mochokidae
- Genus: Synodontis
- Species: S. resupinatus

Binomial name
- Synodontis resupinatus Boulenger, 1904

= Synodontis resupinatus =

Species of fish

Synodontis resupinatus is a species of upside-down catfish that is native to the Niger basin and the Bénoué River of Cameroon, Mali, and Nigeria. It was first described by British-Belgian zoologist George Albert Boulenger in 1904, from specimens obtained near Lokoja, Nigeria.

== Description ==
Like all members of the genus Synodontis, S. resupinatus has a strong, bony head capsule that extends back as far as the first spine of the dorsal fin. The head contains a distinct narrow, bony, external protrusion called a humeral process. The shape and size of the humeral process helps to identify the species. In S. resupinatus, the humeral process is flat, rough, longer than it is broad, and obtusely pointed at the end.

The fish has three pairs of barbels. The maxillary barbels are on located on the upper jaw, and two pairs of mandibular barbels are on the lower jaw. The maxillary barbel is straight without any branches, with a broad membrane at the base. It extends slightly longer than the head. The outer pair of mandibular barbels is about 1/2 as long as the head, the inner pair is about 1/3 as long. The mandibular barbels, have long, slender branches with secondary branches.

The front edges of the dorsal fins and the pectoral fins of Syntontis species are hardened into stiff spines. In S. resupinatus, the spine is as long as the head, slightly curved, smooth in the front and back. The remaining portion of the dorsal fin is made up of seven branching rays, with a very long filament at the end. The spine of the pectoral fin is as long as the dorsal spine, and serrated on both sides. The adipose fin is 2 1/2 times as long as it is deep. The anal fin contains five unbranched and eight branched rays, and is pointed. The tail, or caudal fin, is deeply notched, with the upper lobe tapering into a fine point.

All members of Syndontis have a structure called a premaxillary toothpad, which is located on the very front of the upper jaw of the mouth. This structure contains several rows of short, chisel-shaped teeth. In S. resupinatus, the toothpad forms a short, broad band. On the lower jaw, or mandible, the teeth of Syndontis are attached to flexible, stalk-like structures and described as "s-shaped" or "hooked". The number of teeth on the mandible is used to differentiate between species; in S. resupinatus, there are about 60 teeth on the mandible.

The color of the fish is a pale greyish brown on the back and sides, and black on the underside. The fins are grey, and the barbels are whitish.

The maximum standard length of the species is 26 centimetres (10 in). Generally, females in the genus Synodontis tend to be slightly larger than males of the same age.

== Habitat and behavior ==
In the wild, the species is known from the Niger and Benue River basins. The species is harvested for human consumption. It lives in streams and lakes, and feeds on plankton, plants, and detritus. The reproductive habits of most of the species of Synodontis are not known, beyond some instances of obtaining egg counts from gravid females. Spawning likely occurs during the flooding season between July and October, and pairs swim in unison during spawning. The growth rate is rapid in the first year, then slows down as the fish age.
