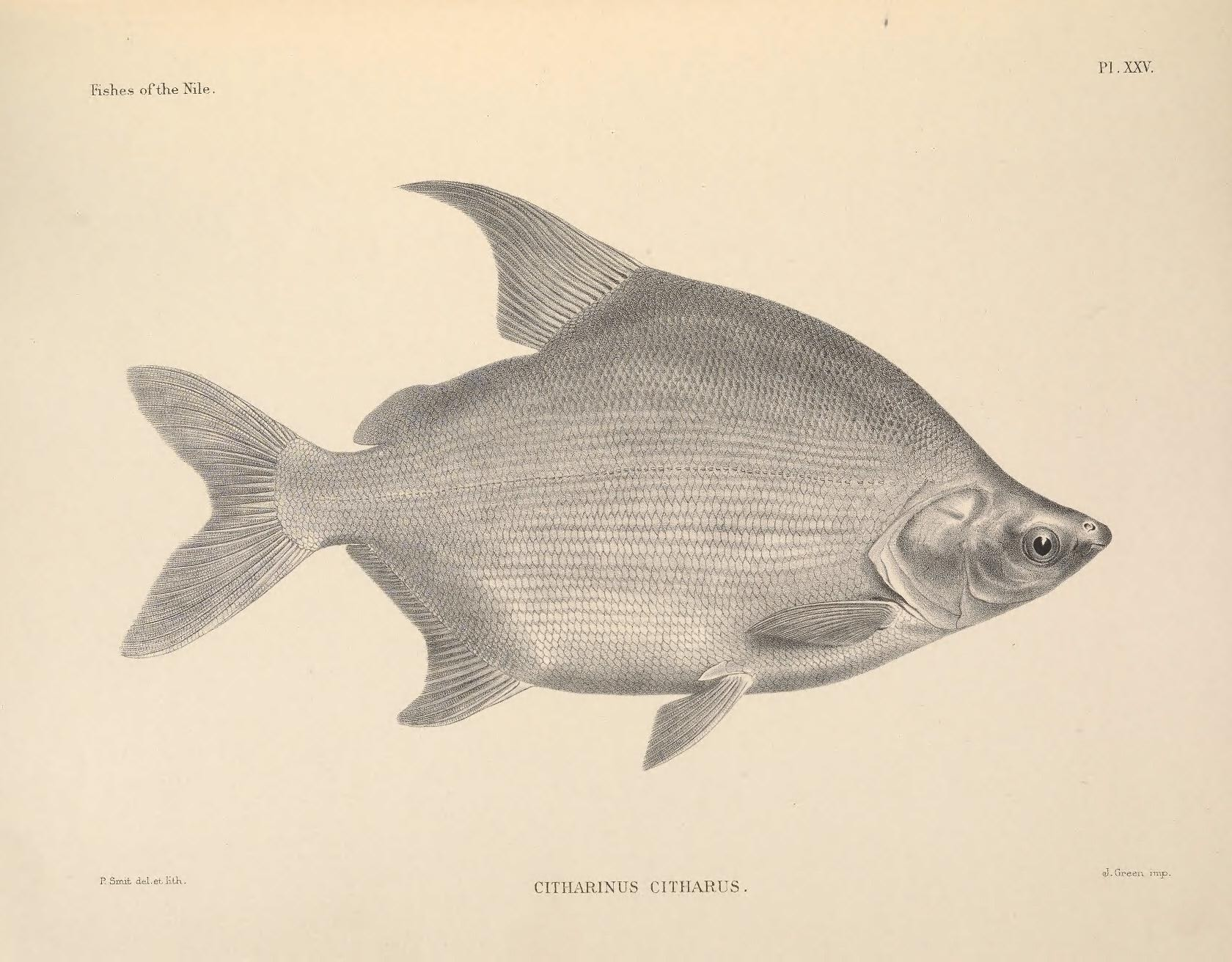
- Representation of the fish

Conservation status
- Least Concern (IUCN 3.1)

Scientific classification
- Kingdom: Animalia
- Phylum: Chordata
- Class: Actinopterygii
- Division: Teleostei
- Order: Characiformes
- Family: Citharinidae
- Genus: Citharinus
- Species: C. citharus

Binomial name
- Citharinus citharus (É. Geoffroy Saint-Hilaire, 1809)

Synonyms
- Serrasalmus citharus Geoffroy St. Hilaire, 1809; Citharinus geoffroei Cuvier, 1829; Distichodus marnoi Steindachner, 1881; Citharinus citharus intermedius Worthington, 1932

= Citharinus citharus =

Species of fish

Citharinus citharus, commonly called moonfish or mleke, is a species of lutefish from tropical Africa. C. citharus has detritivorous habits leading to its stomach containing high volumes of indigestible materials such as chitin, cellulose, and lignin. This species has adapted to digest protein and organic matter at a fast rate so that it can reach its nutritional needs while having a high concentration of indigestible material in its stomach.

The diploid chromosome count of this species is 2n=40.

== Subspecies ==
- Citharinus citharus citharus nominate subspecies in Uganda
- Citharinus citharus intermedius Worthington, 1932
