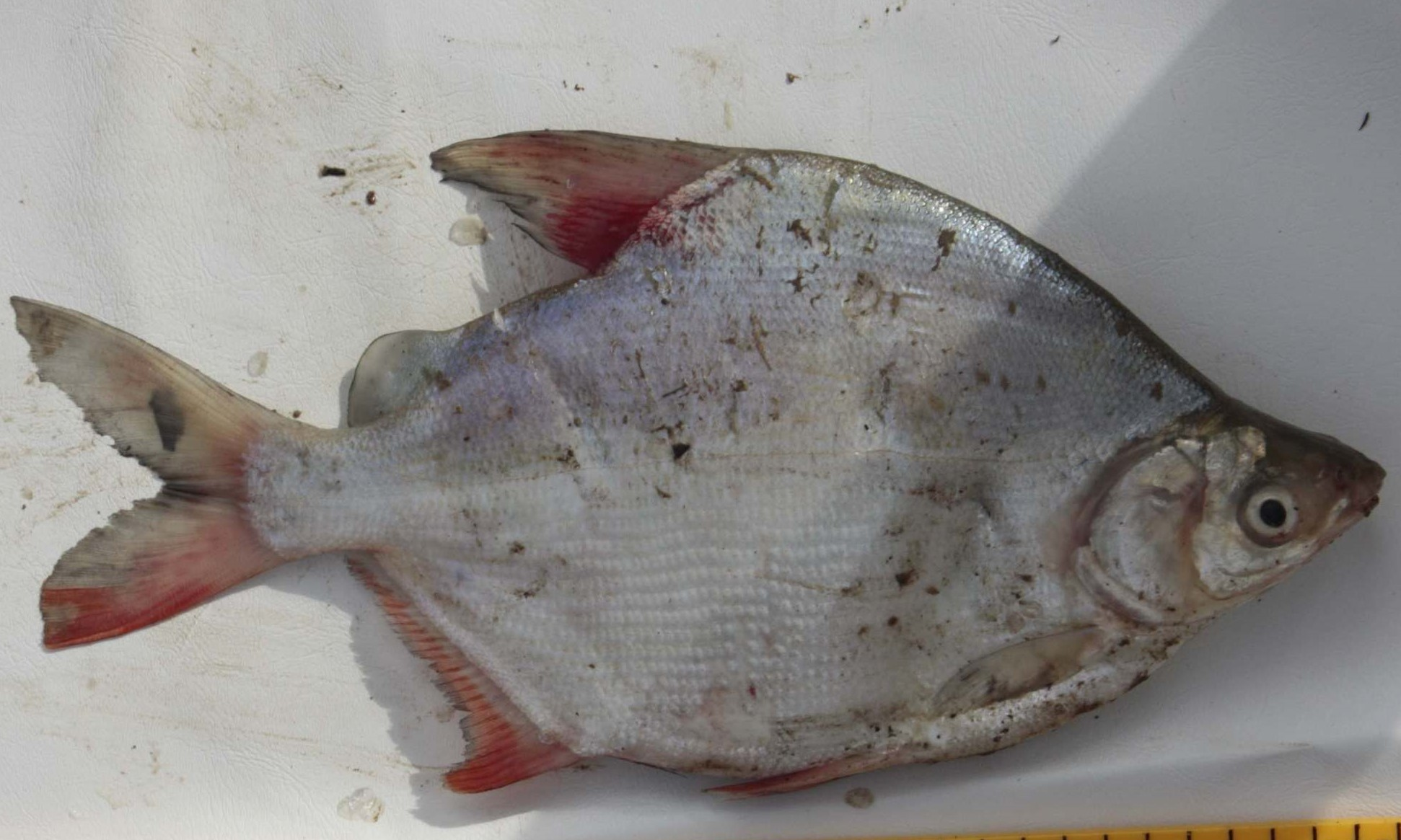

Conservation status
- Least Concern (IUCN 3.1)

Scientific classification
- Kingdom: Animalia
- Phylum: Chordata
- Class: Actinopterygii
- Division: Teleostei
- Order: Characiformes
- Family: Citharinidae
- Genus: Citharinus
- Species: C. latus

Binomial name
- Citharinus latus J. P. Müller & Troschel, 1844

= Citharinus latus =

Species of fish

Citharinus latus is a species of lutefish found in tropical Africa.

== Distribution ==
Found in Africa: where it is known from Senegal, Casamance, Niger, Volta, the Chad Basin and certain coastal rivers in Guinéa-Bissau, Togo and Benin. Also has been found in the Nile and Lake Mobutu Sese Seko (Lake Albert).

== Description ==
Citharinus latus reaches a standard length of 84 cm (33 in).

The diploid chromosome count of this species is 2n=40.
