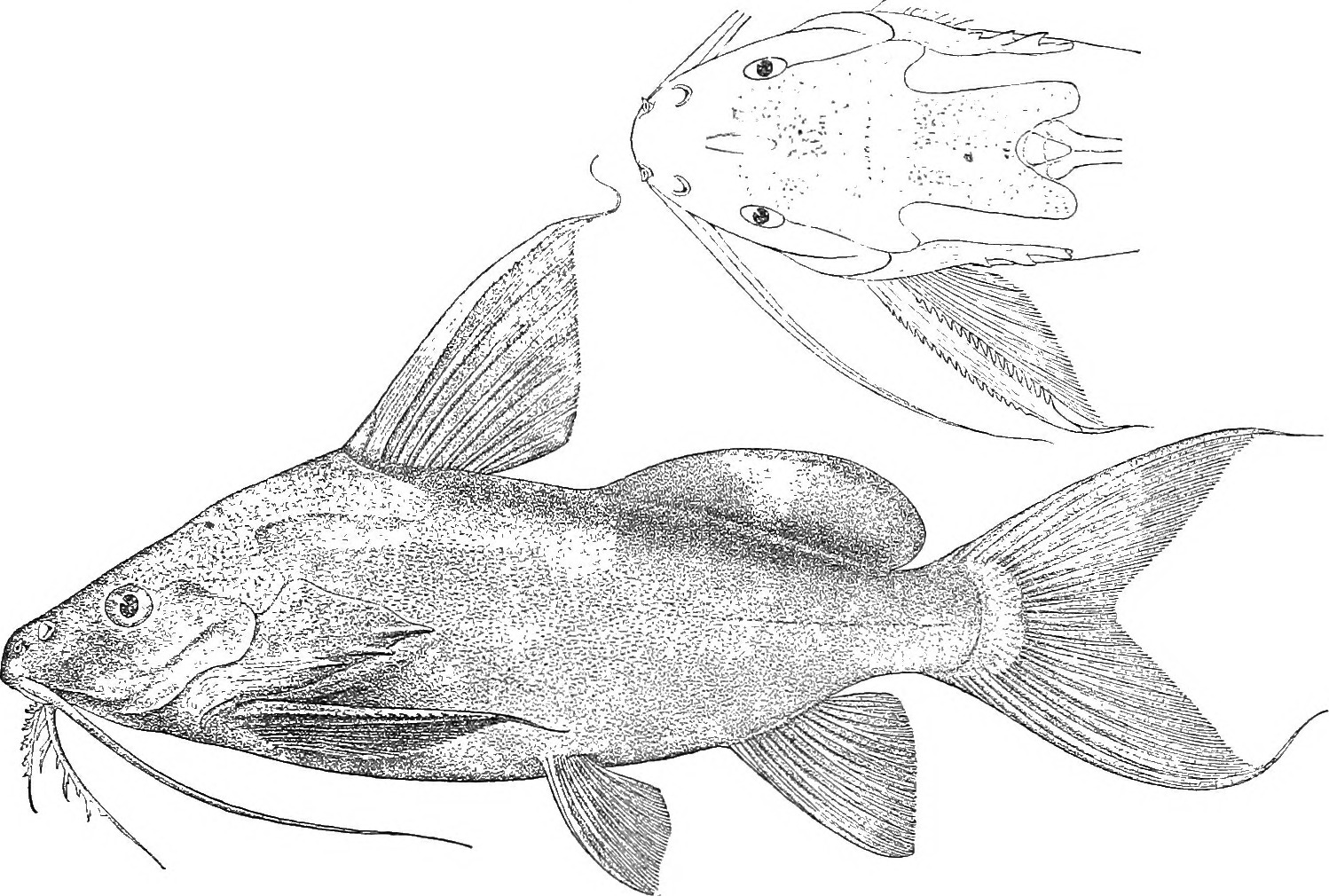

Conservation status
- Least Concern (IUCN 3.1)

Scientific classification
- Kingdom: Animalia
- Phylum: Chordata
- Class: Actinopterygii
- Order: Siluriformes
- Family: Mochokidae
- Genus: Synodontis
- Species: S. budgetti

Binomial name
- Synodontis budgetti Boulenger, 1911

= Synodontis budgetti =

Species of fish

Synodontis budgetti, known as Budgett's synodontis, is a species of upside-down catfish native to Benin, Cameroon, Central African Republic, Côte d'Ivoire, Mali, Niger, and Nigeria where it occurs in Lake Nokoue and the Niger. It was first described by Belgian-British zoologist George Albert Boulenger in 1911, from specimens collected in Lokoja, Nigeria. The species name budgetti comes from name of the collector of the original specimen, J.S. Budgett.

== Description ==
Like all members of the genus Synodontis, S. budgetti has a strong, bony head capsule that extends back as far as the first spine of the dorsal fin. The head contains a distinct narrow, bony, external protrusion called a humeral process. The shape and size of the humeral process helps to identify the species. In S. budgetti, the humeral process is 1 1/2 times as long as it is broad, with three spines directed backwards.

The fish has three pairs of barbels. The maxillary barbels are on located on the upper jaw, and two pairs of mandibular barbels are on the lower jaw. The maxillary barbel is straight without any branches, with a wide membrane at the base. It extends 1 3/5 the length of the head. The outer pair of mandibular barbels is about twice as long as the inner pair.

The front edges of the dorsal fins and the pectoral fins of Syntontis species are hardened into stiff spines. In S. budgetti, the spine of the dorsal fin is long and slightly curved, about as long as the head, bearing a long filament, smooth in the front and serrated on the back. The remaining portion of the dorsal fin is made up of seven branching rays. The spine of the pectoral fin about as long as the dorsal fin spine, and serrated on both sides. The adipose fin is 3 times as long as it is deep. The anal fin contains five unbranched and seven branched rays. The tail, or caudal fin, is deeply forked, with both lobes ending in a long filament.

All members of Syndontis have a structure called a premaxillary toothpad, which is located on the very front of the upper jaw of the mouth. This structure contains several rows of short, chisel-shaped teeth. In S. budgetti, the toothpad forms a short and broad band. On the lower jaw, or mandible, the teeth of Syndontis are attached to flexible, stalk-like structures and described as "s-shaped" or "hooked". The number of teeth on the mandible is used to differentiate between species; in S. budgetti, there are 55 teeth on the mandible.

The body color is a uniform brownish.

The maximum total length of the species is 39.5 centimetres (15.6 in), and a standard length of 29.7 centimetres (11.7 in). Generally, females in the genus Synodontis tend to be slightly larger than males of the same age.

== Habitat and behavior ==
In the wild, the species has been found in the Niger River basin. The reproductive habits of most of the species of Synodontis are not known, beyond some instances of obtaining egg counts from gravid females. Spawning likely occurs during the flooding season between July and October, and pairs swim in unison during spawning. As a whole, species of Synodontis are omnivores, consuming insect larvae, algae, gastropods, bivalves, sponges, crustaceans, and the eggs of other fishes. The growth rate is rapid in the first year, then slows down as the fish age.
