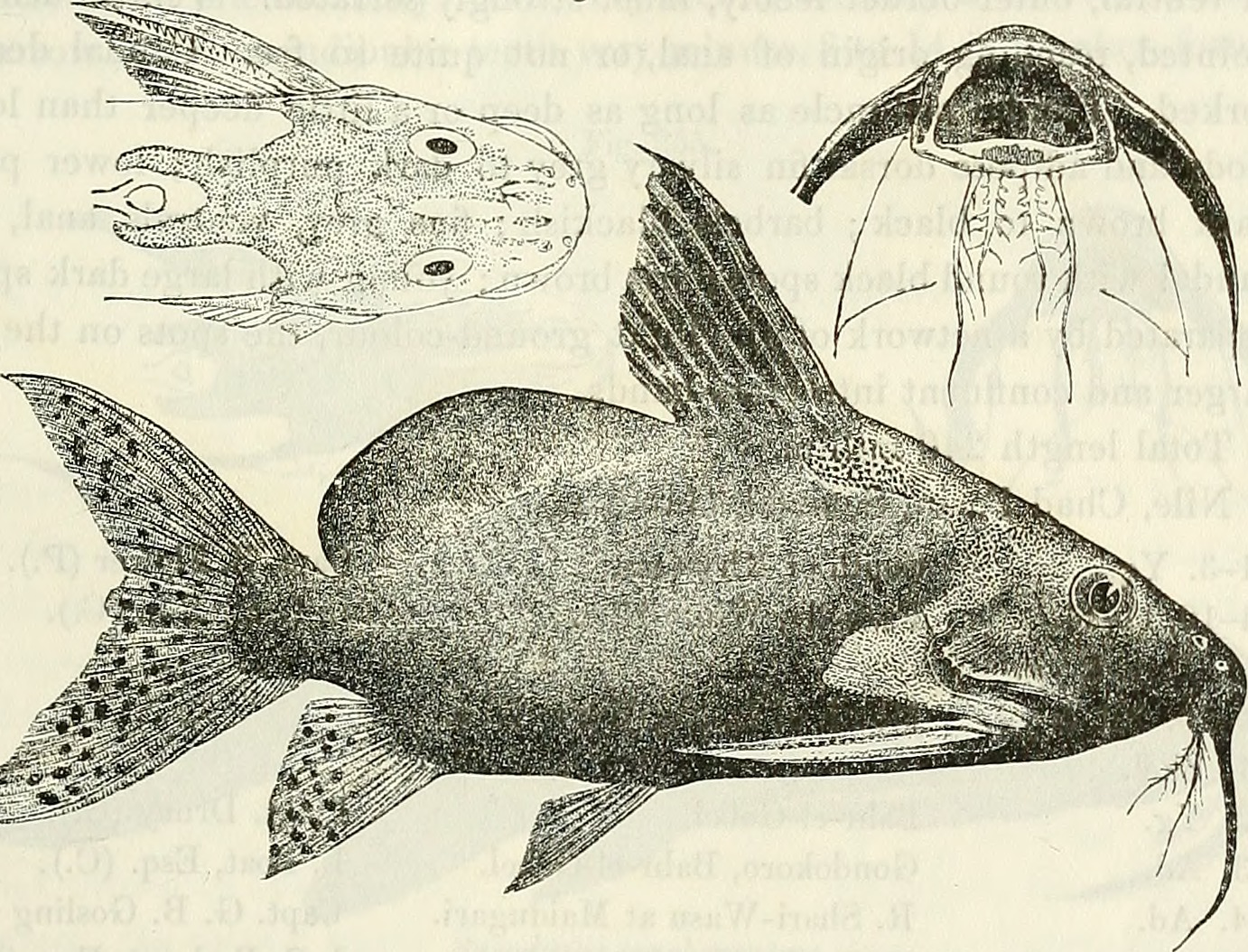

Conservation status
- Least Concern (IUCN 3.1)

Scientific classification
- Kingdom: Animalia
- Phylum: Chordata
- Class: Actinopterygii
- Order: Siluriformes
- Family: Mochokidae
- Genus: Synodontis
- Species: S. membranaceus

Binomial name
- Synodontis membranaceus (Geoffroy Saint-Hilaire, 1809)

Synonyms
- Hemisynodontis membranacea (Geoffroy Saint-Hilaire, 1809); Pimelodus membranaceus Geoffroy Saint-Hilaire, 1809; Synodontis guentheri Vaillant, 1893

= Synodontis membranaceus =

Species of fish

Synodontis membranaceus, known as the moustache catfish, is a species of upside-down catfish that is native to northern Africa. It was first described by French naturalist Geoffroy Saint-Hilaire in 1809 as Pimelodus membranaceus, from specimens obtained in the Nile River. The species name membranaceus refers to membranes present on the barbels of the fish.

== Description ==
Like all members of the genus Synodontis, S. membranaceus has a strong, bony head capsule that extends back as far as the first spine of the dorsal fin. The head contains a distinct bony, external protrusion called a humeral process. The shape and size of the humeral process helps to identify the species. In S. membranaceus, the humeral process is subtriangular, flat, rough, and as long or shorter than it is deep.

The fish has three pairs of barbels. The maxillary barbels are on located on the upper jaw, and two pairs of mandibular barbels are on the lower jaw. The maxillary barbel is straight without any branches, with a broad membrane down the length almost to the end. It extends about the length of the head. The inner pair of mandibular barbels is about 1/3 to 2/3 as long as the outer pair, have long, slender branches with secondary branches, and a membrane in the outer half.

The front edges of the dorsal fins and the pectoral fins of Syntontis species are hardened into stiff spines. In S. membranaceus, the spine is 3/5 to 4/5 as long as the head, straight or curved, smooth on the front and serrated on the back. The remaining portion of the dorsal fin is made up of seven branching rays. The spine of the pectoral fin is as long or a little longer than the dorsal spine, and serrated on both sides. The adipose fin is 3 to 5 times as long as it is deep. The anal fin contains five unbranched and eight to nine branched rays, and is acutely pointed. The tail, or caudal fin, is deeply forked.

All members of Syndontis have a structure called a premaxillary toothpad, which is located on the very front of the upper jaw of the mouth. This structure contains several rows of short, chisel-shaped teeth. In S. membranaceus, the toothpad forms a short, narrow band. On the lower jaw, or mandible, the teeth of Syndontis are attached to flexible, stalk-like structures and described as "s-shaped" or "hooked". The number of teeth on the mandible is used to differentiate between species; in S. membranaceus, there are about 8 to 14 small teeth on the mandible.

The color of the fish is silvery grey or whitish on the back and sides, with the lower parts and underside dark brown to black. The barbels are whitish, with a dark brown or black border on the membrane. Juveniles may have poorly defined dark blotches on the body and spots forming stripes on the fins that will fade with age.

The maximum standard length of the species is 46 centimetres (18 in). Generally, females in the genus Synodontis tend to be slightly larger than males of the same age.

== Habitat and behavior ==
In the wild, the species is known from Senegal to Sudan. The species is harvested for human consumption. It naturally occurs in the deep water of streams, close to the shore. In the wild, it swims upside down with its belly facing upward, which explains its darker colors on the underside and lighter colors on the dorsal side. In captivity, however, the fish sometimes stops swimming upside down and its color pattern reverses, so that it is dark on the back and light on the underside. In the wild, it feeds on plankton, detritus, insects, crustaceans, and mollusks. The reproductive habits of most of the species of Synodontis are not known, beyond some instances of obtaining egg counts from gravid females. Spawning likely occurs during the flooding season between July and October, and pairs swim in unison during spawning. The growth rate is rapid in the first year, then slows down as the fish age.
