= Citharinops =

Conservation status
- Least Concern (IUCN 3.1)

Scientific classification
- Kingdom: Animalia
- Phylum: Chordata
- Class: Actinopterygii
- Division: Teleostei
- Order: Characiformes
- Family: Citharinidae
- Genus: Citharinops; Daget, 1962
- Species: C. distichodoides

Binomial name
- Citharinops distichodoides (Pellegrin, 1919)

Synonyms
- Citharinus distichodoides Pellegrin, 1919; Citharinus thomasi Pellegrin, 1924

Species of fish

Citharinops is a monospecific genus of freshwater ray-finned fish belonging to the family Citharinidae, the lutefishes. The only species in the genus is Citharinops distichodoides which is found in the catchments of Lake Chad, the Benué River, the Niger River and Volta River in Burkina Faso, Cameroon, Chad, Ghana, Mali and Nigeria. This species has a maximum total length of 84 cm (33 in) with a maximum published weight of 4.6 kg (10 lb).
