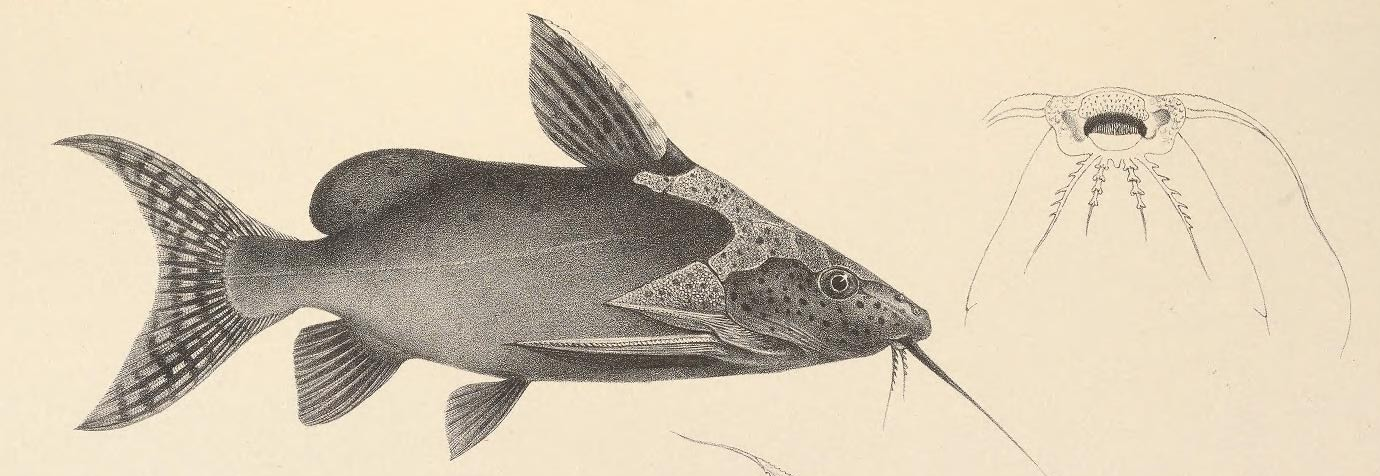

Conservation status
- Least Concern (IUCN 3.1)

Scientific classification
- Kingdom: Animalia
- Phylum: Chordata
- Class: Actinopterygii
- Order: Siluriformes
- Family: Mochokidae
- Genus: Synodontis
- Species: S. nigrita

Binomial name
- Synodontis nigrita Valenciennes, 1840

Synonyms
- Synodontis fascipinna Nichols & La Monte, 1953

= Synodontis nigrita =

Species of fish

Synodontis nigrita, known as the false upside down catfish, is a species of upside-down catfish that occurs widely in northern Africa. It was first described by French zoologist Achille Valenciennes in 1840. The type specimen is in the Muséum National d' Histoire Naturelle de Paris.

== Description ==
Like all members of the genus Synodontis, S. nigrita has a strong, bony head capsule that extends back as far as the first spine of the dorsal fin. The head contains a distinct narrow, bony, external protrusion called a humeral process. The shape and size of the humeral process helps to identify the species. In S. nigrita, the humeral process is as much longer than it is broad, with a ridge on the bottom edge, and with a pointed back end.

The fish has three pairs of barbels. The maxillary barbels are on located on the upper jaw, and two pairs of mandibular barbels are on the lower jaw. The maxillary barbel is long and straight without any branches, with a broad membrane at the base. It extends to a length about 1 to 1 2/3 times the length of the head. The outer pair of mandibular barbels is about twice the length of the inner pair, and both pairs have short, simple branches.

The front edges of the dorsal fins and the pectoral fins of Syntontis species are hardened into stiff spines. In S. nigrita, the spine of the dorsal fin is straight or slightly curved, 3/4 to 1 times the length of the head, smooth in the front and serrated on the back. The remaining portion of the dorsal fin is made up of seven branching rays. The spine of the pectoral fin about the same size as the dorsal spine, and serrated on both sides. The adipose fin is 2 2/3 to 3 times as long as it is deep. The anal fin contains four unbranched and eight to nine branched rays. The tail, or caudal fin, is deeply forked, with the upper lobe slightly longer.

All members of Syndontis have a structure called a premaxillary toothpad, which is located on the very front of the upper jaw of the mouth. This structure contains several rows of short, chisel-shaped teeth. In S. nigrita, the toothpad forms a short and broad band. On the lower jaw, or mandible, the teeth of Syndontis are attached to flexible, stalk-like structures and described as "s-shaped" or "hooked". The number of teeth on the mandible is used to differentiate between species; in S. nigrita, there are about 30 to 35 teeth on the mandible.

The body color is brown or olive to blackish, with round black spots likely. The fins are greyish to blackish; the caudal fin has black spots or black cross bars. Juveniles are brown, with black spots.

The maximum total length of the species is 33.5 centimetres (13.2 in). Generally, females in the genus Synodontis tend to be slightly larger than males of the same age.

== Habitat and behavior ==
In the wild, the species has been found throughout northern Africa. In central Africa, it has been recorded in the Ubangui River basin and the central Congo River basin. In eastern Africa, it is found in Lake Albert and possibly Lake Kyoga. In northern Africa, it is possibly present in Egypt. In northeast Africa, it occurs in the White Nile from Khartoum into the Jebel and Ghazal River systems, as well as the Baro River. In western Africa, the species is known from the Chad River basin, the Niger River basin, the Volta River, the Senegal River, the Gambia River, the Geba River, the Oueme River, and the Casamance River. The reproductive habits of most of the species of Synodontis are not known, beyond some instances of obtaining egg counts from gravid females. Spawning likely occurs during the flooding season between July and October, and pairs swim in unison during spawning. As a whole, species of Synodontis are omnivores, consuming insect larvae, algae, gastropods, bivalves, sponges, crustaceans, and the eggs of other fishes. The growth rate is rapid in the first year, then slows down as the fish age.

== See also ==
- List of freshwater aquarium fish species
