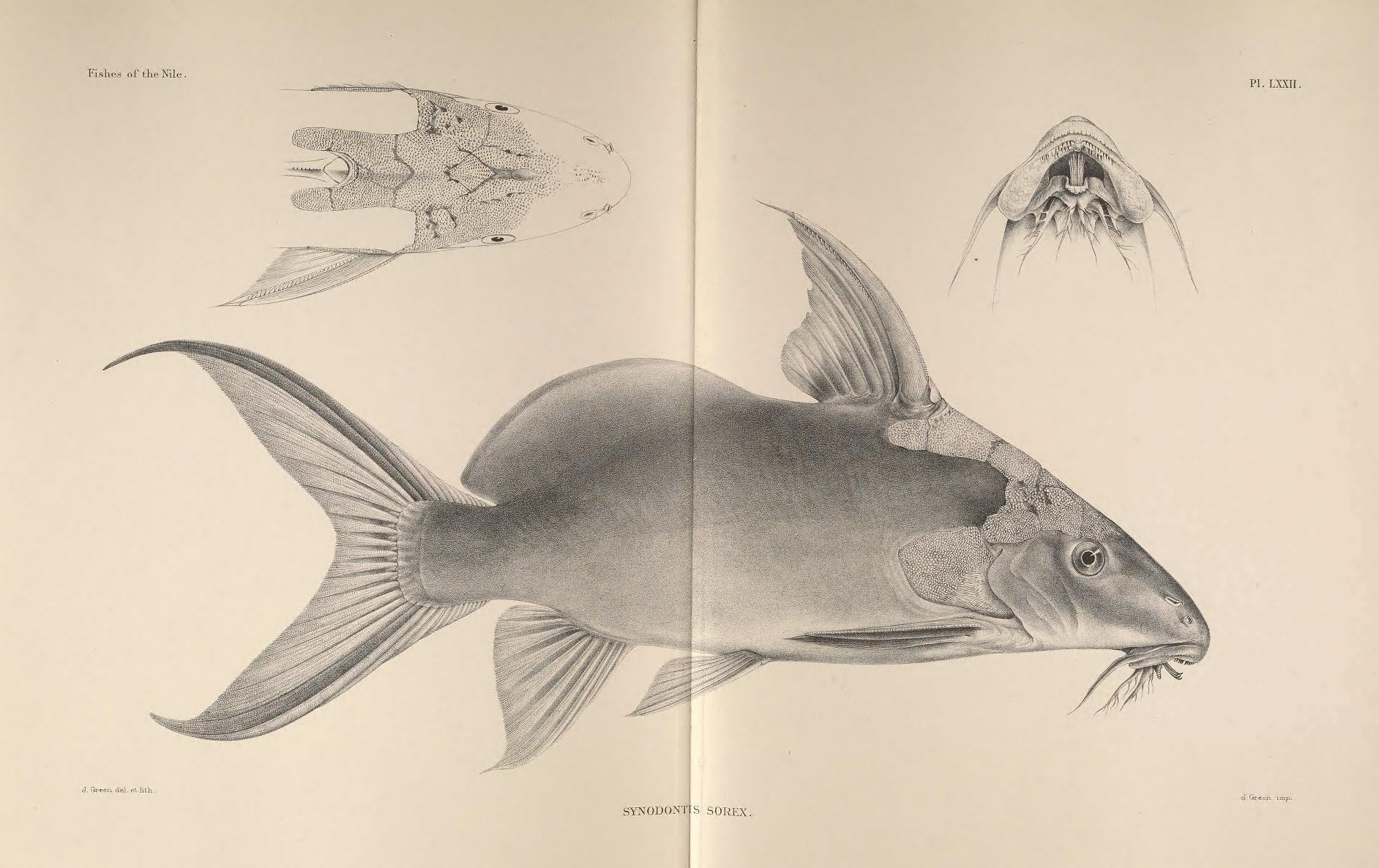

Conservation status
- Least Concern (IUCN 3.1)

Scientific classification
- Kingdom: Animalia
- Phylum: Chordata
- Class: Actinopterygii
- Order: Siluriformes
- Family: Mochokidae
- Genus: Synodontis
- Species: S. sorex

Binomial name
- Synodontis sorex Günther, 1864

= Synodontis sorex =

Species of fish

Synodontis sorex is a species of upside-down catfish that is widely distributed in the rivers of northern Africa. It was first described by German zoologist Albert Günther in 1864, from specimens obtained in the upper Nile River, near Khartoum, Sudan. The species name sorex comes from the Latin word for shrew or shrew-mouse, the allusion was not explained. It possibly describes the pointed snout or the long, slender teeth.

== Description ==
Like all members of the genus Synodontis, S. sorex has a strong, bony head capsule that extends back as far as the first spine of the dorsal fin. The head contains a distinct narrow, bony, external protrusion called a humeral process. The shape and size of the humeral process helps to identify the species. In S. sorex, the humeral process is rough, a little longer than it is broad, and rounded or stubby at the end.

The fish has three pairs of barbels. The maxillary barbels are on located on the upper jaw, and two pairs of mandibular barbels are on the lower jaw. The maxillary barbel is straight without any branches, with a broad membrane at the base. It extends about 2/5 to 1/2 the length of the head. The outer pair of mandibular barbels is about 1 1/2 or 2 times as long as the inner pair, have long, slender branches with secondary branches.

The front edges of the dorsal fins and the pectoral fins of Syntontis species are hardened into stiff spines. In S. sorex, the spine is slightly shorter to slightly longer as the head, straight or curved, serrated in the front and back. The remaining portion of the dorsal fin is made up of seven branching rays. The spine of the pectoral fin is shorter than the dorsal spine, and smooth on the outer edge, and serrated on the inner edge. The adipose fin is 3 to 5 times as long as it is deep. The anal fin contains four unbranched and eight branched rays, and is acutely pointed. The tail, or caudal fin, is very deeply forked, with the upper lobe longer than the lower lobe, and frequently ending in a filament.

All members of Syndontis have a structure called a premaxillary toothpad, which is located on the very front of the upper jaw of the mouth. This structure contains several rows of short, chisel-shaped teeth. In S. sorex, the toothpad forms two or three series, and there are relatively few teeth. On the lower jaw, or mandible, the teeth of Syndontis are attached to flexible, stalk-like structures and described as "s-shaped" or "hooked". The number of teeth on the mandible is used to differentiate between species; in S. sorex, there are about 6 to 8 teeth on the mandible.

The color of the fish is grey on the back and sides, becoming white on the underside. The fins are light-colored, with a distinct blotch on the dorsal fin near the base, and a dark band on each lobe of the caudal fin. The barbels are white.

The maximum standard length of the species is 36 centimetres (14 in). Generally, females in the genus Synodontis tend to be slightly larger than males of the same age.

== Habitat and behavior ==
In the wild, the species is widespread, and is known from Senegal to Ethiopia. The species is harvested for human consumption. The reproductive habits of most of the species of Synodontis are not known, beyond some instances of obtaining egg counts from gravid females. Spawning likely occurs during the flooding season between July and October, and pairs swim in unison during spawning. The growth rate is rapid in the first year, then slows down as the fish age.
