= Ngizim language =

Chadic language spoken in Nigeria

Ngizim
- Native to: Nigeria
- Region: Yobe State
- Native speakers: (80,000 cited 1993)
- Language family: Afro-Asiatic: Chadic; West Chadic; Bade–Warji; Bade (B.1); Ngizim

Language codes
- ISO 639-3: ngi
- Glottolog: ngiz1242
- ELP: Ngizim

Ngizim (also known as Ngizmawa, Ngezzim, Ngódṣin) is a Chadic language spoken by the Ngizim people in Yobe State, Nigeria.

== Writing System ==
Ngizim alphabet
Uppercase	Ǝ	A	B	Ɓ	C	D	Ɗ	E	F	G	H	I	J	K	L
Lowercase	ǝ	a	b	ɓ	c	d	ɗ	e	f	g	h	i	j	k	l
Uppercase	M	N	O	P	R	R̃	S	T	U	V	W	Y	ʼY	Z	
Lowercase	m	n	o	p	r	r̃	s	t	u	v	w	y	ʼy	z	

The digraphs dl, sh, tl, zh are also used.
