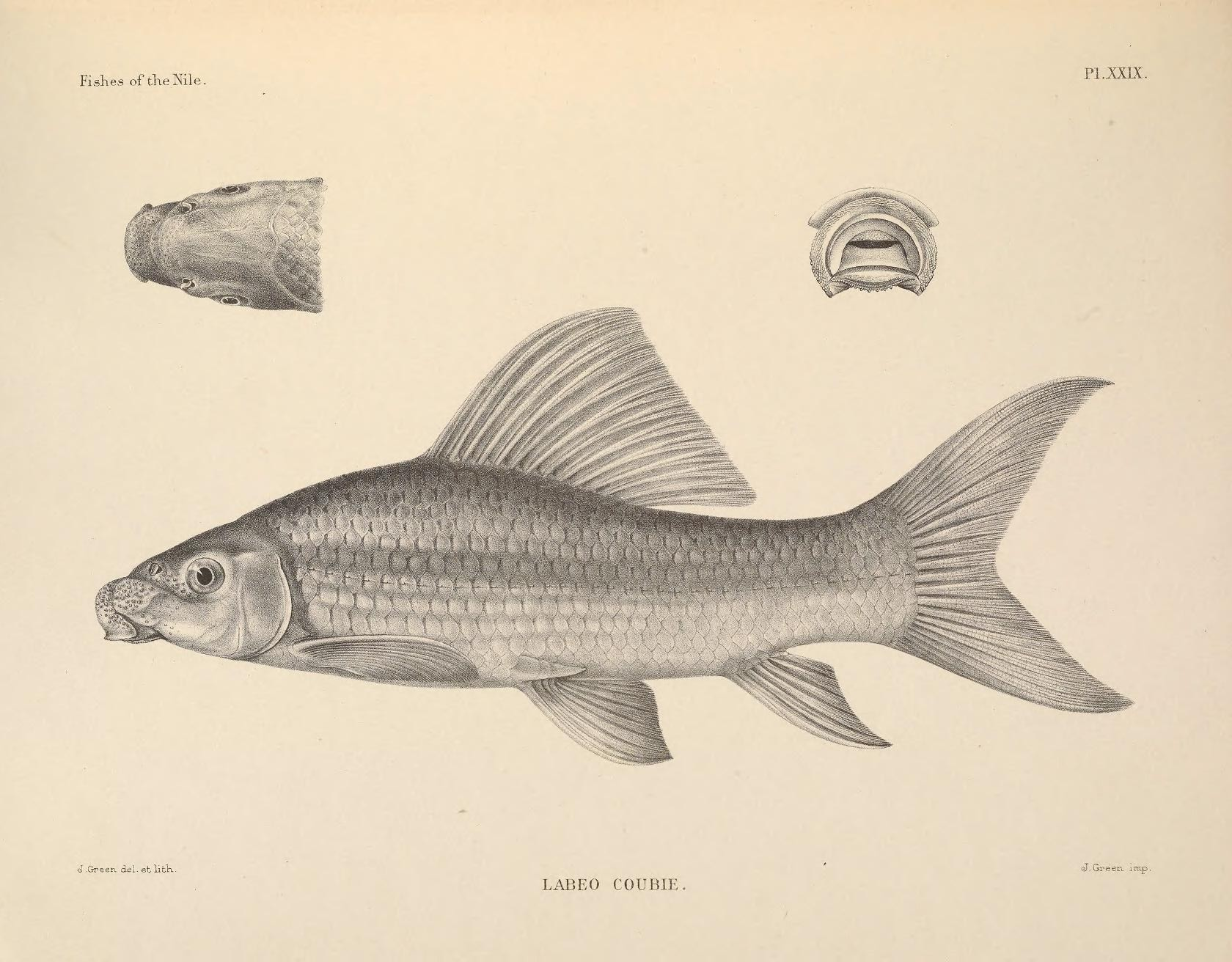

Conservation status
- Least Concern (IUCN 3.1)

Scientific classification
- Kingdom: Animalia
- Phylum: Chordata
- Class: Actinopterygii
- Order: Cypriniformes
- Family: Cyprinidae
- Subfamily: Labeoninae
- Genus: Labeo
- Species: L. coubie

Binomial name
- Labeo coubie Rüppell, 1832

Synonyms
- Labeo cubie Rüppell, 1832; Labeo lereensis Blache & Miton, 1960; Labeo pseudocoubie Blache & Miton, 1960; Labeo selti Valenciennes, 1842; Labeo steindachneri Pfeffer, 1896; Labeo uhamensis Pellegrin, 1920

= Labeo coubie =

African carp

Species of fish

Labeo coubie, the African carp, is a cyprinid fish, widespread in Africa, where it occurs within the drainage basin of the Nile (Blue, White, Lake Albert) and in the Chad, Niger-Benue, Volta, Senegal and Gambia Rivers, as well as the Cross River and Cameroon coastal rivers. Furthermore, it is also known from East Africa and the middle reaches of the Congo. Records from the Zambezi drainage need confirmation.
