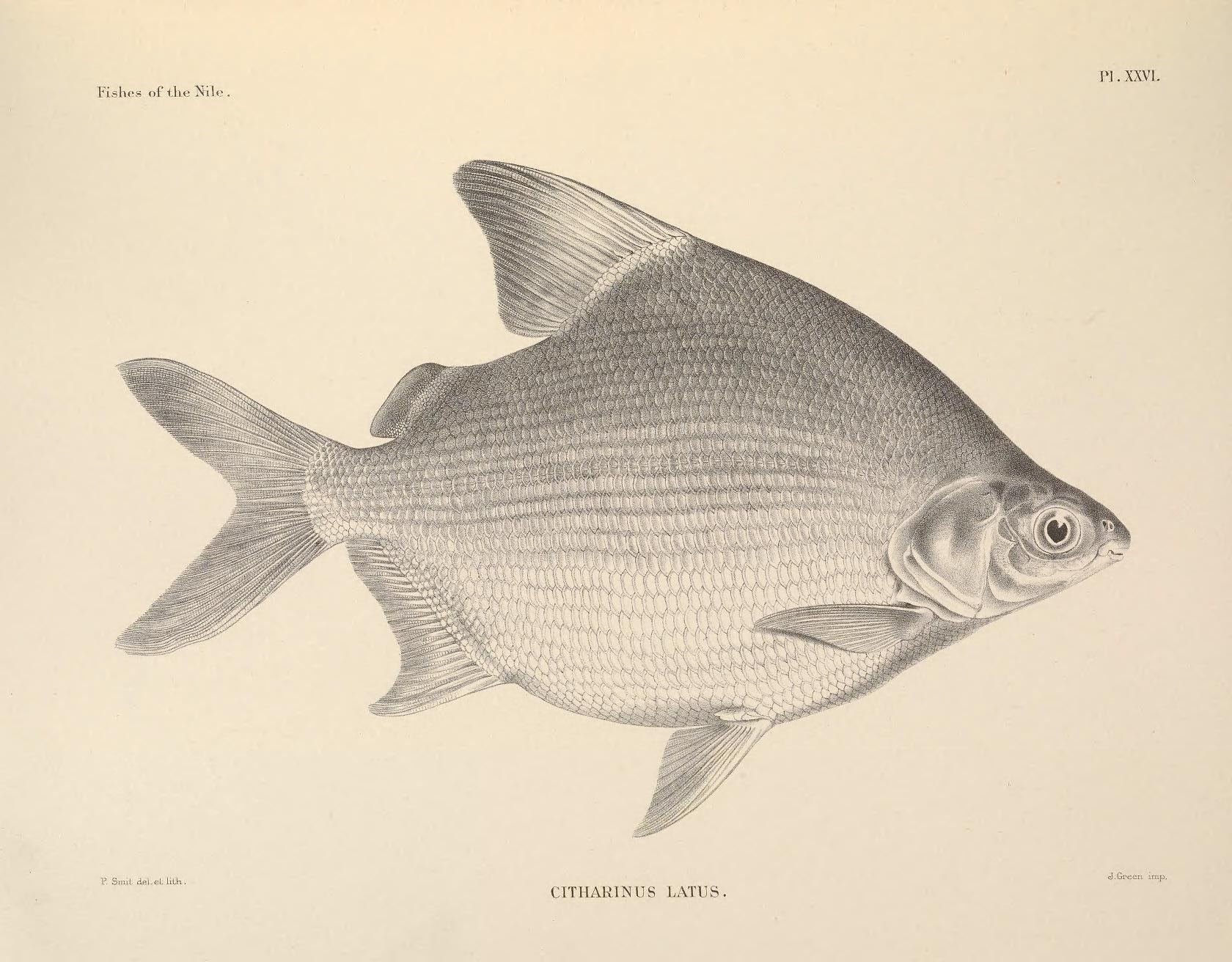
- Citharinus latus

Scientific classification
- Kingdom: Animalia
- Phylum: Chordata
- Class: Actinopterygii
- Division: Teleostei
- Order: Characiformes
- Suborder: Citharinoidei
- Family: Citharinidae; Günther, 1864

Genera
- See text

= Citharinidae =

Family of fishes

The Citharinidae, the lutefishes, are a small family of characiform fish. They are freshwater fish native to Africa, and are sufficiently abundant to be significant food fishes.

They are deep-bodied, silvery fish, measuring up to 84 cm (33 in) in length and weighing up to 18 kg (40 lb). They are filter feeders.

== Genera ==
The family contains three genera:

- Citharidium Boulenger, 1902 (monotypic)
- Citharinops Daget, 1962 (monotypic)
- Citharinus Cuvier, 1817 (6 species)

Vari's 1979 treatment considers Citharinops a synonym of Citharinus.
