= River Wonders =

Zoo in Singapore

Coordinates: 1.403782°N 103.79414°E

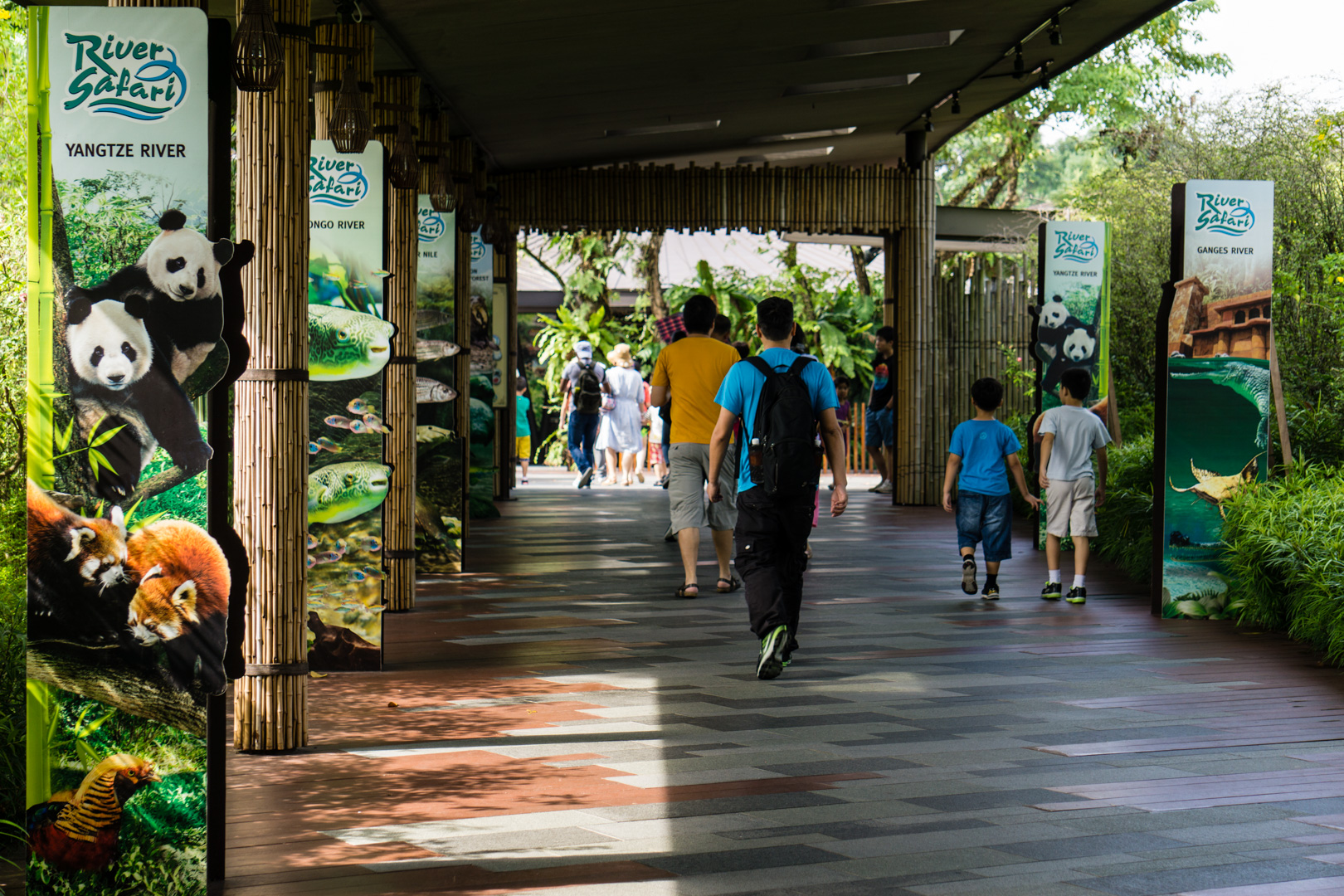
- Entrance of River Wonders
- Interactive map of River Wonders
- Date opened: 29 November 2012; 13 years ago (Giant Panda Forest); 3 April 2013; 13 years ago (soft opening); 28 February 2014; 12 years ago (official opening)
- Location: Mandai, Singapore; 80 Mandai Lake Road, Singapore 729826
- Land area: 12 ha (30 acres)
- No. of animals: 11,000
- No. of species: 260
- Annual visitors: 966,890 (FY 2019/20)
- Public transit: 138 (Note: via TE4 Springleaf and NS16 CR11 Ang Mo Kio); 927 (Note: via NS4 JS1 BP1 Choa Chu Kang)
- Website: www.mandai.com/en/river-wonders

River Wonders, formerly known as River Safari, is a river-themed zoo and aquarium located in Mandai, Singapore, it forms a part of the Mandai Wildlife Reserve, consisting of the Singapore Zoo, Night Safari and Bird Paradise and the newly opened Rainforest Wild. It is built over 12 hectares (30 acres) and nestled between its two counterparts, the Singapore Zoo and the Night Safari, Singapore. It is the first of its kind in Asia and features freshwater exhibits and a river boat ride as its main highlights. The safari was built at a cost of S$160m, with an expected visitor rate of 820,000 people yearly.

== History ==
Conceptualisation of such as River Wonders (then known as River Safari) began in early 2007, and its construction was officially announced to the public on 11 February 2009 with an estimated completion date of late 2011. The project began with an estimated budget of S$140 million as well as an annual visitor rate of 750,000. However, after the original announcement in 2009, the budget increased by S$20 million in 2010, due to rising construction costs, to S$160 million. The annual visitor rate also increased to 820,000.

The park is built within the current 89-hectare (220-acre) compound already shared by the Singapore Zoo and Night Safari and occupies 12 hectares (30 acres), making it the smallest of the four parks.

The Giant Panda Forest was opened to the public on 29 November 2012, with a soft opening on 3 April 2013, attracting close to 1,500 visitors. The park was officially opened on 28 February 2014, and it was announced that more than 1.1 million have visited the River Safari since its soft opening in April 2013.

On 13 October 2021, River Safari was renamed to River Wonders.

== Exhibits ==
River Gems

This tank and aviary displays various species of smaller fish, such as tetras, danios and gouramis, and birds, including violet turacos and Von der Decken's hornbills.

River of Africa

This area houses elephantnose fish, eastern bottlenose, giraffe catfish and Atlantic tarpons.

Congo River

The Congo River area consists of a pond containing various Lake Malawi cichlids, ringed teals, and crowned hornbills in a paludarium setup. A nearby tank showcases Lake Tanganyika cichlids.

Nile River

A large Egyptian-themed tank houses two species of tigerfish; the African and Goliath tigerfish, alongside African arowanas, African pike, giraffe catfish, lapradei bichir and saddled bichir.

Ganges River

Themed after a Hindu temple, the area features gharials and a tank for clown knifefish and goonch.

Mary River

A tank replicating a mangrove forest houses a variety of Australian fish, including Australian lungfish and banded archerfish. Nearby is a smaller enclosure for mudskippers and a former touch pool which now houses mangrove horseshoe crabs.

Mekong River

Visitors first view an enclosure for a troop of lion-tailed macaques. The main attraction of this area is a large tank that houses several giant fish from the Mekong, such as Mekong giant catfish, giant freshwater stingrays and Siamese giant carp. Several smaller tanks feature smaller fish species. There is also an aviary based on a rice paddy field in Thailand, housing painted storks, black-faced spoonbills, rufous night herons and spotted whistling ducks.

Yangtze River

Rare species such as a false gharials, Chinese giant salamanders, Chinese high-fin banded sharks and sturgeons are displayed in this area.

Pavilion Capital Giant Panda Forest

The Pavilion Capital Giant Panda Forest spans 1500 square-metres and is specially climate-controlled enclosure which change to simulate the giant panda's natural habitat. As of 2026, it is home to a male and female pair named Kai Kai (凯凯) and Jia Jia (嘉嘉). Their cub, Le Le (叻叻), was born in 2021, and returned to China in 2023. Kai Kai and Jia Jia were brought To River Wonders in 2012, transported by a Boeing 747-400 registered 9V--SFP. Red pandas are also housed in this area. Visitors can watch the staff prepare fresh bamboo daily for the pandas.

Amazon River Quest

The Amazon River Quest is a boat ride that features several South American animals such as collared peccaries, brown capuchin monkeys, red howler monkeys, red-backed bearded sakis, brown-headed spider monkeys, giant anteaters, guanacos, Brazilian tapirs, jaguars, black howler monkeys, greater flamingos and capybaras.

Wild Amazonia

Near the Amazon River Quest are a series of enclosures, each housing green anacondas, white-lipped tamarins, cotton-top tamarins, a pond for silver arowanas and other fish and Cuvier's dwarf caimans. Initially, the area also featured the Squirrel Monkey Forest, featuring a walkthrough squirrel monkey habitat, but in 2023, it was renamed Amazonian Encounters and now houses Azara's agoutis, macaws, squirrel monkeys, white-faced sakis, capybaras, and yellow-footed tortoises.

Amazon Flooded Forest

The Amazon Flooded Forest is a large indoor complex that features a wide variety of species from the Amazon River. Giant otters are visible from a viewing tunnel, and several smaller tanks house electric eels, a shoal of Crenicichla lugubris and smaller fish, such as blue discus and altum angelfish. Also, several amphibian tanks house Lake Titicaca frogs. This complex boasts the largest tank in the park which holds the park's group of West Indian manatees, arapaima, red-tailed catfish and pacu. River Wonders has had success in breeding manatees. In August 2016, two young male manatees named Junior and Kai were released into a protected bay in Guadeloupe to participate in a breeding programme. However, on October 2 2016, Junior died of renal failure. At the end of the building is a tank for freshwater stingrays.

== Attractions ==
The park boasts a tropical rainforest setting along with as river theme with various animal attractions, theme park rides and other major exhibits.

=== Giant pandas ===
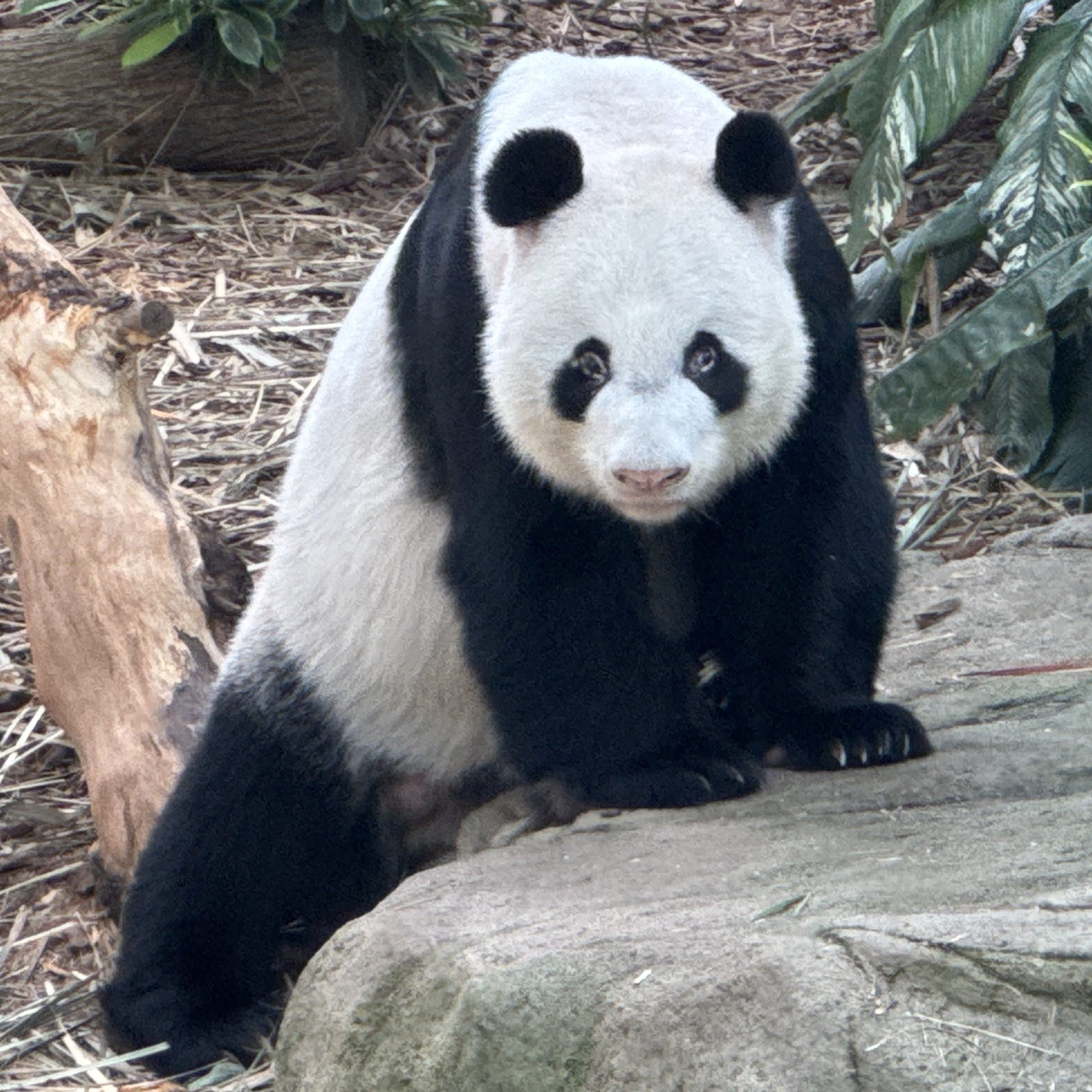
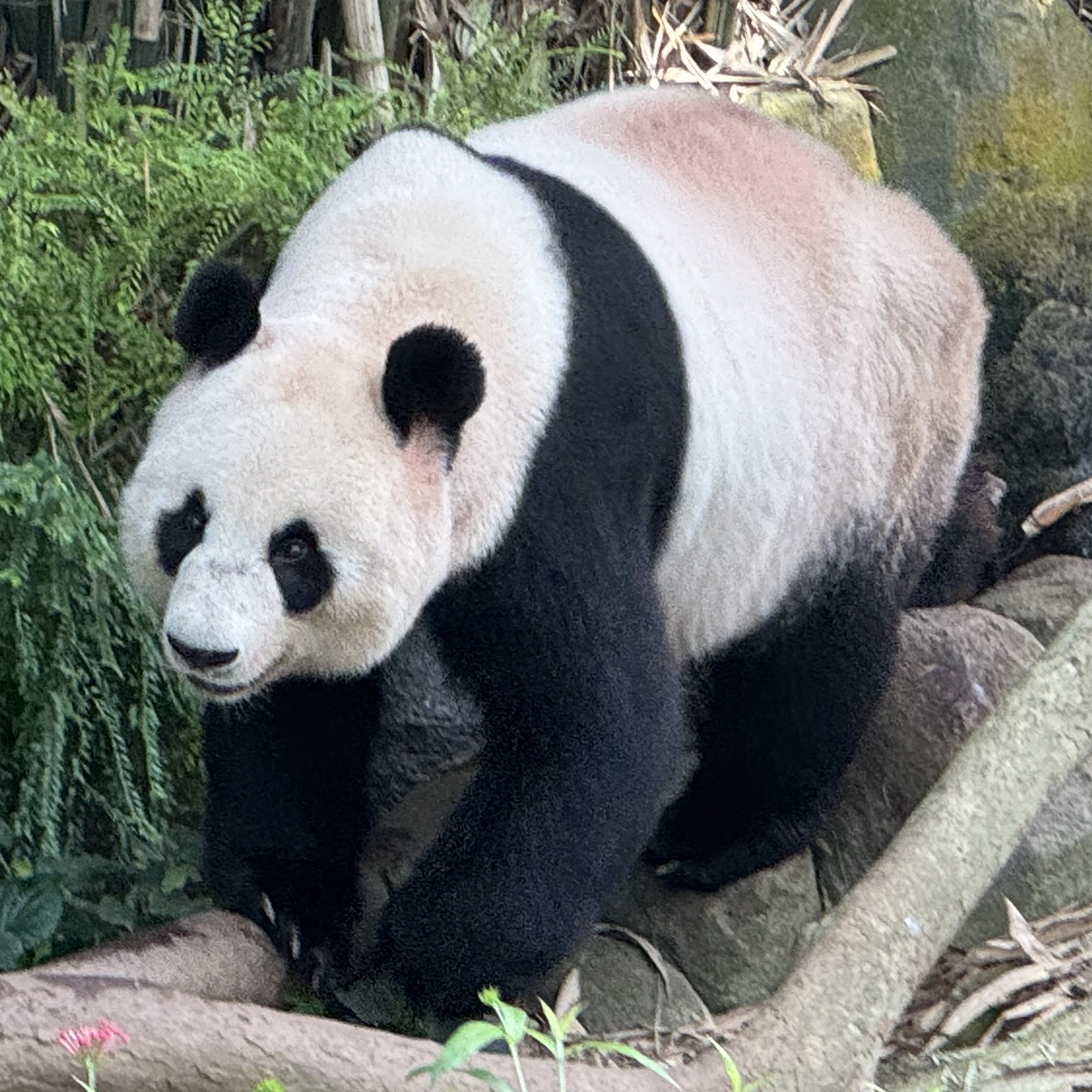
Kai Kai (left) and Jia Jia (right) in 2026

One of the main attractions is a pair of male and female giant pandas – Kai Kai (凯凯) and Jia Jia (嘉嘉) – which are housed in a specially constructed climate-controlled enclosure which change throughout the four seasons emulating their original environment. The zoo grows its own 8,000-square-metre (86,000 sq ft) plantation of special bamboo specially for the feeding of the giant pandas. These pandas are a sign of the twentieth anniversary of friendly Sino-Singapore relations. The park also received a conservation donation from CapitaLand. The names of the two pandas were selected from entries of a public naming competition organised in 2010. The pandas, which arrived in September 2012, are on a ten-year loan from China.

On 14 August 2021, a cub was born to Kai Kai and Jia Jia, later revealed to be a male on 10 September. This was the first after seven breeding rounds since 2015, which did not yield any cubs. The panda cub was conceived via artificial insemination. During the first few days after the cub was born, Jia Jia was given fluids as well as a glucose diet to get through the trying period with her mothering skills improving by the day.

Subsequently, on 26 August 2021, Mandai Wildlife Reserve (then Wildlife Reserves Singapore) announced that the cub will return to China once it turns two, the age when it matures. By this point, the cub's characteristic black markings began to appear. Discussions are also ongoing with Chinese authorities to extend Kai Kai and Jia Jia's stay beyond 2022, the initial period when the pandas are supposed to return. This is to allow for more breeding programmes to be conducted after the cub separates from the parents. On 22 September 2021, the panda cub opened his eyes to the world for the first time when he was 40 days old and weighing 1.87kg, an increase of 370g from the previous week. Two weeks later, the cub weighed 2.638kg as at 1 October.

On 8 October 2021, the cub was revealed to have grown teeth quicker than expected, given that the teeth were formed two months after birth instead of the three typically. This meant that it would start eating bamboo. Six teeth were seen, with the first forming on 23 September. On 6 October, the panda weighed over 3kg with its length taken as 51.5cm from head to tail. The panda weighed 4.18kg as of 22 October with the length at 59.5cm from head to tail. It was revealed on 19 November 2021 that the cub took its first steps and weighed 6kg with a length of 67cm.

On 29 December 2021, the panda was named Le Le (叻叻) based on the name "Shi Le Po" (石叻坡), an old Chinese term for Singapore. Le Le debuted the following day at its new nursery in the Giant Panda Forest. On 10 March 2022, Le Le joined Jia Jia in the main exhibit with the information board unveiled. On 13 December 2023, Le Le made his last public appearance in Singapore. Le Le was then quarantined the next day in his den for four and a half weeks before being transported to Chengdu, China. On 16 January 2024, Le Le reached Chengdu via a Singapore Airlines Boeing 747-400F freighter aircraft. Le Le would be further quarantined for another 30 days at Huaying, Sichuan.

=== Theme park rides ===
The park's boat ride, the Amazon River Quest, was opened to visitors on 7 December 2013. It takes visitors through several animals from South America.

Formerly, a 15-minute Reservoir Cruise on the Upper Seletar Reservoir, will travel along the outskirts of Singapore Zoo and the Night Safari compound, which border on the reservoir, giving visitors a chance to spot animals including giraffes and Asian elephants. Tickets are priced at S$5 for adults and S$3 for children aged three to 12, on top of River Wonders admission. Each cruise can take up to 40 passengers and runs at 15-minute intervals from 10.30am to 6.00pm daily. The boats are wheelchair-friendly. The ride opened on 1 August 2014. The ride is now permanently closed, with the boats being abandoned.

== Gallery ==
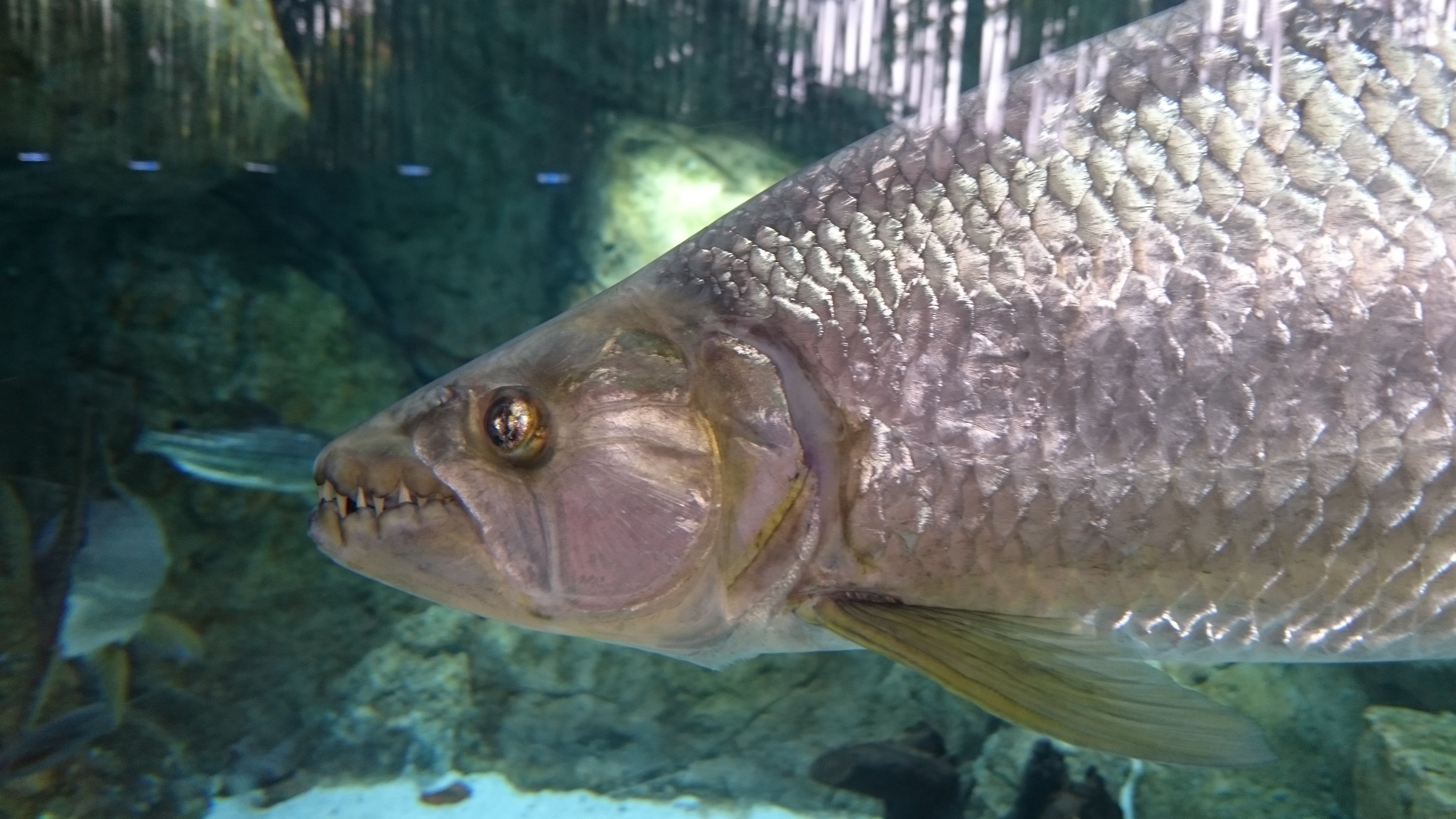
Goliath tigerfish

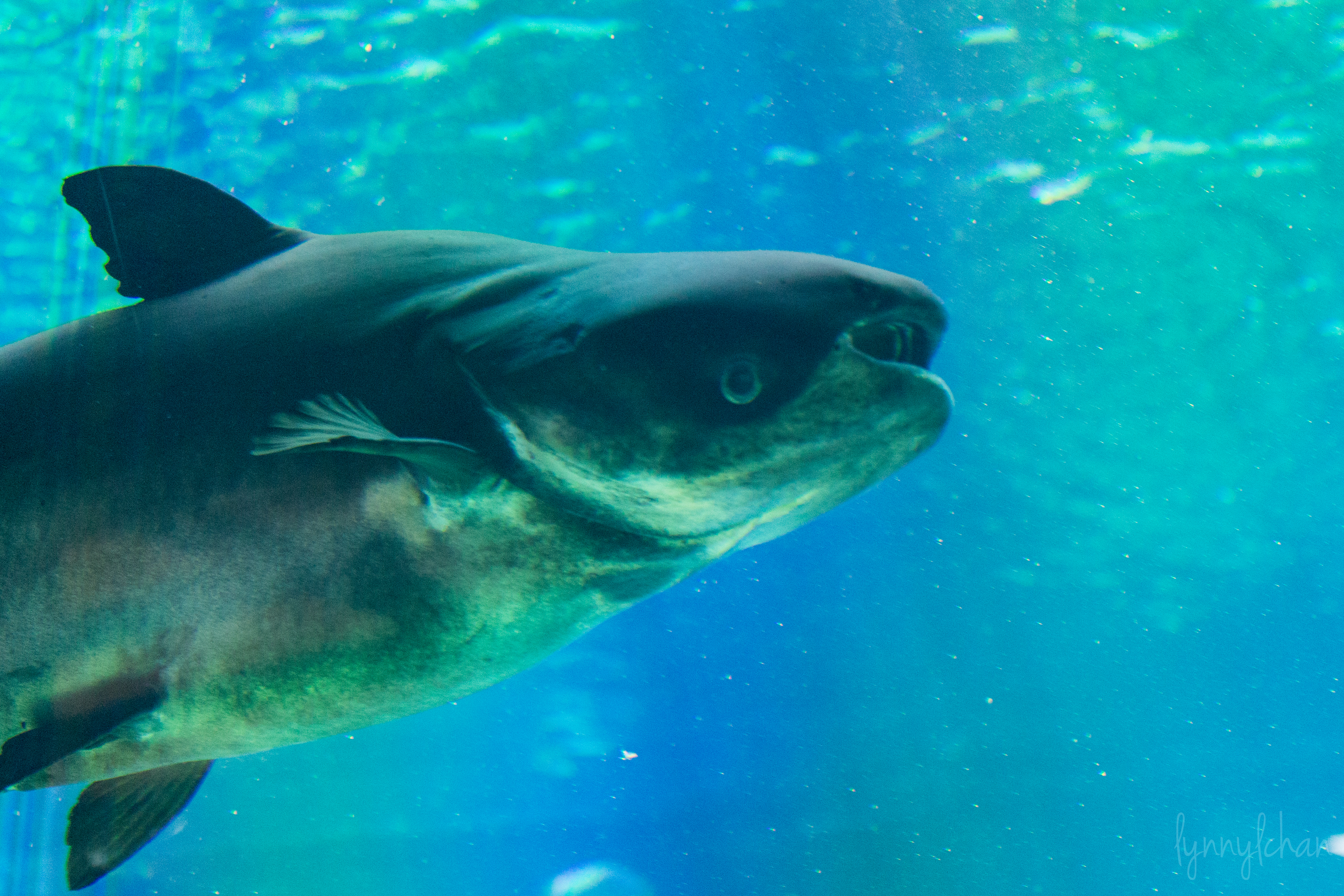
Mekong giant catfish

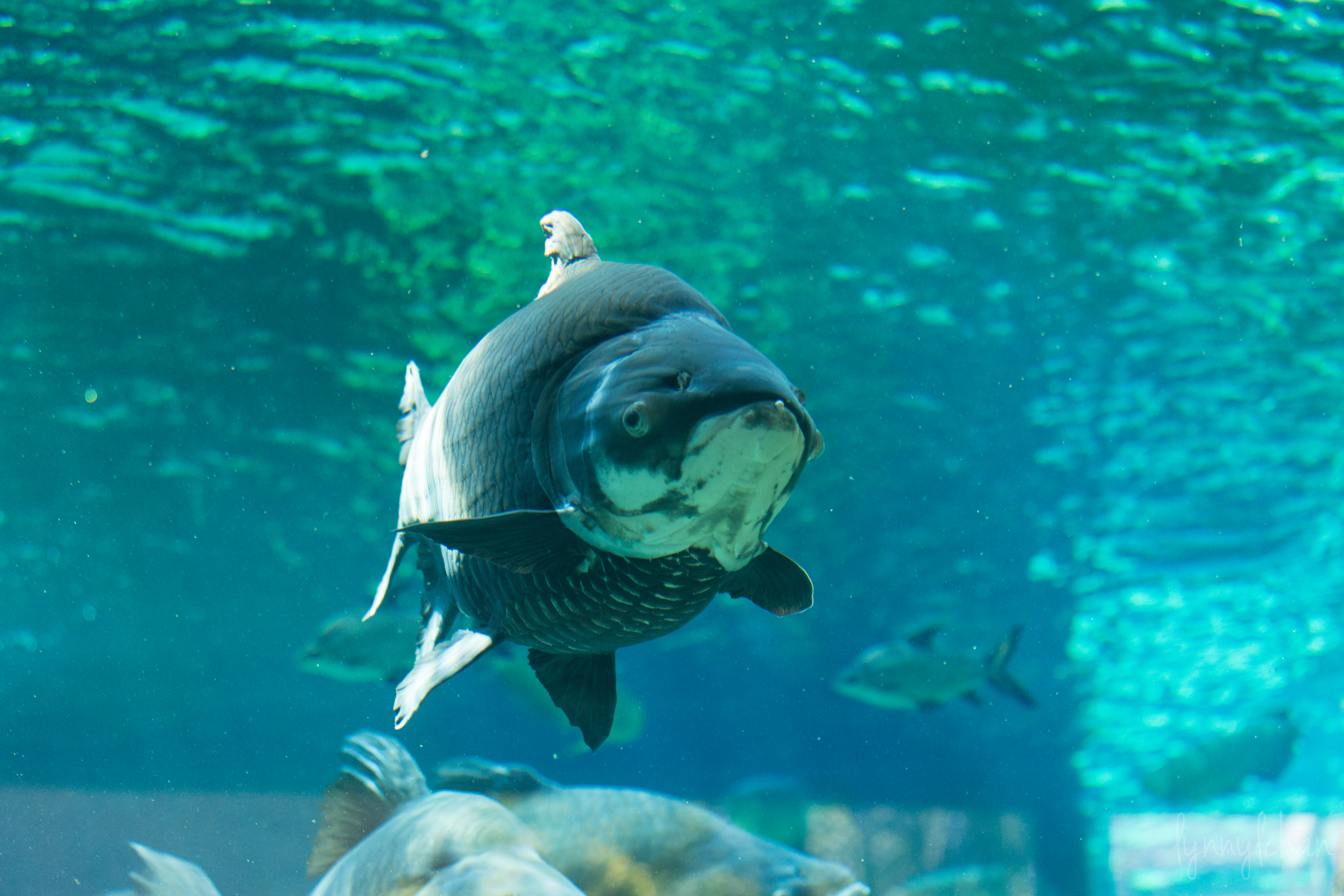
Siamese giant carp

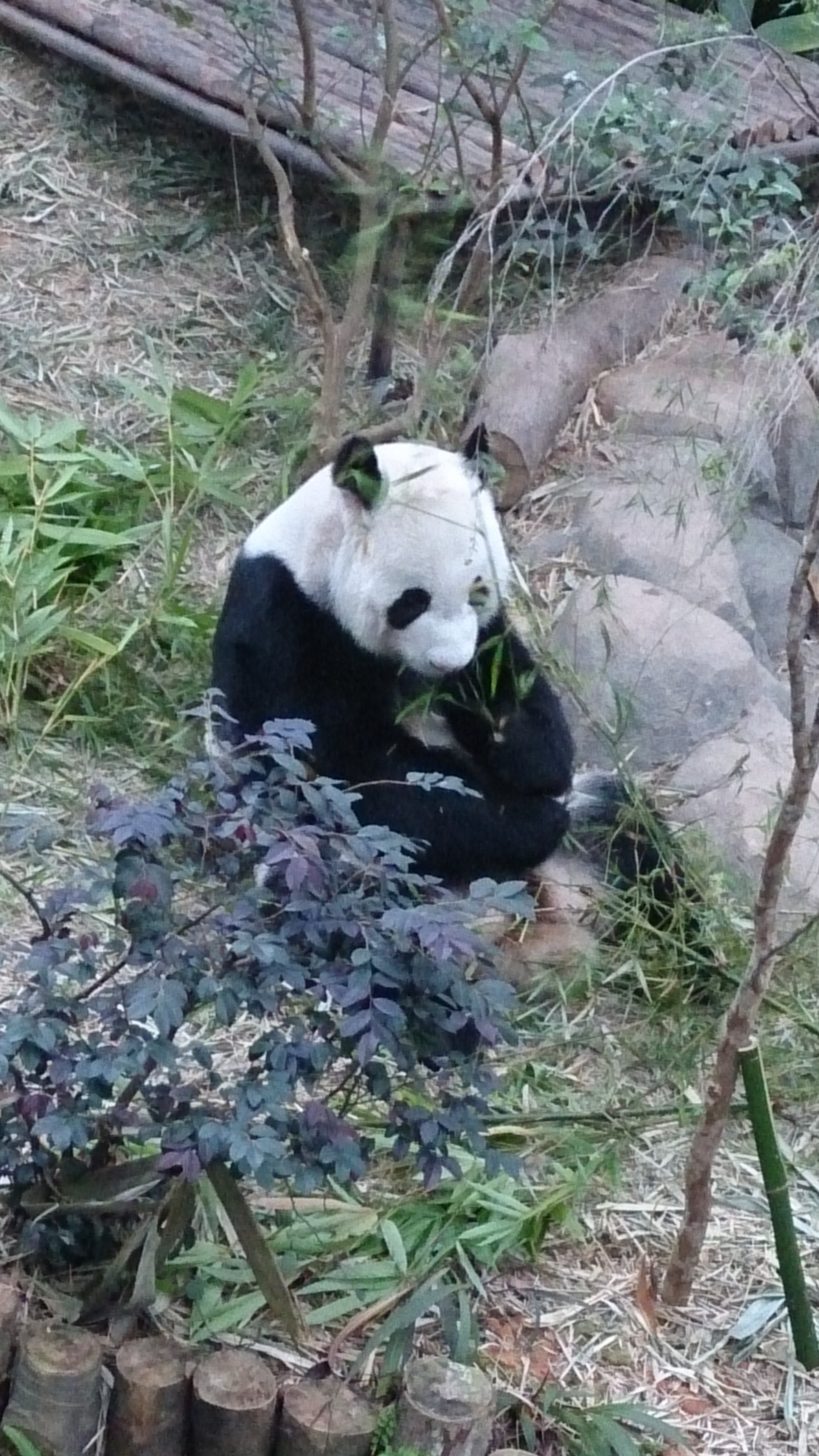
Giant panda Kai Kai

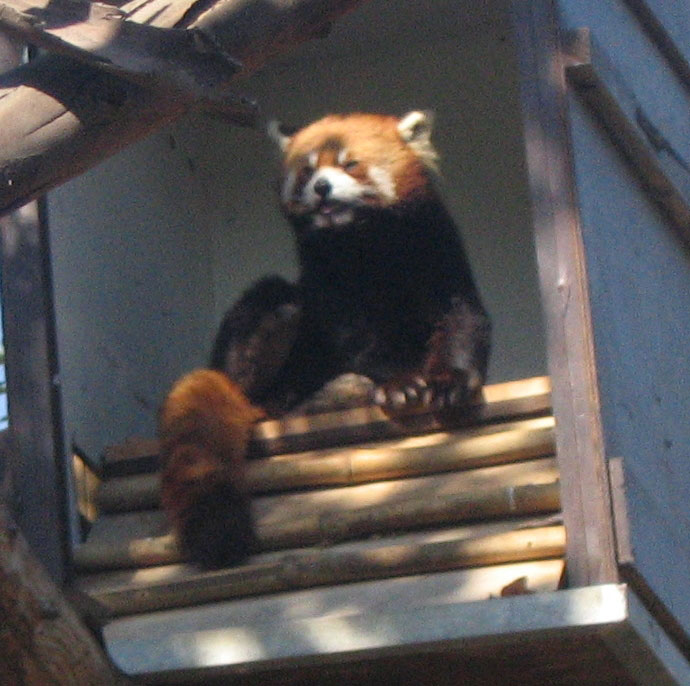
Red panda

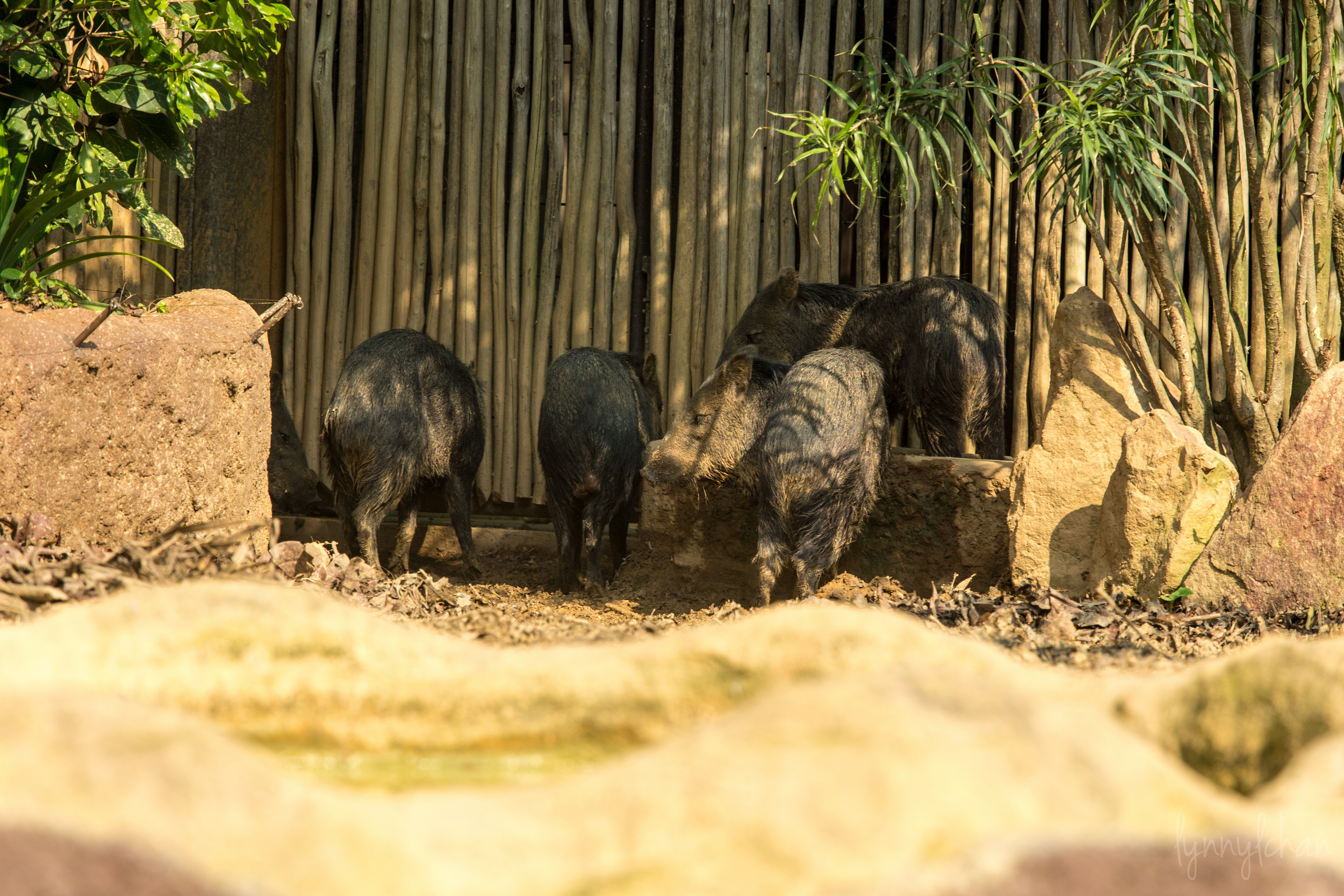
Collared peccary

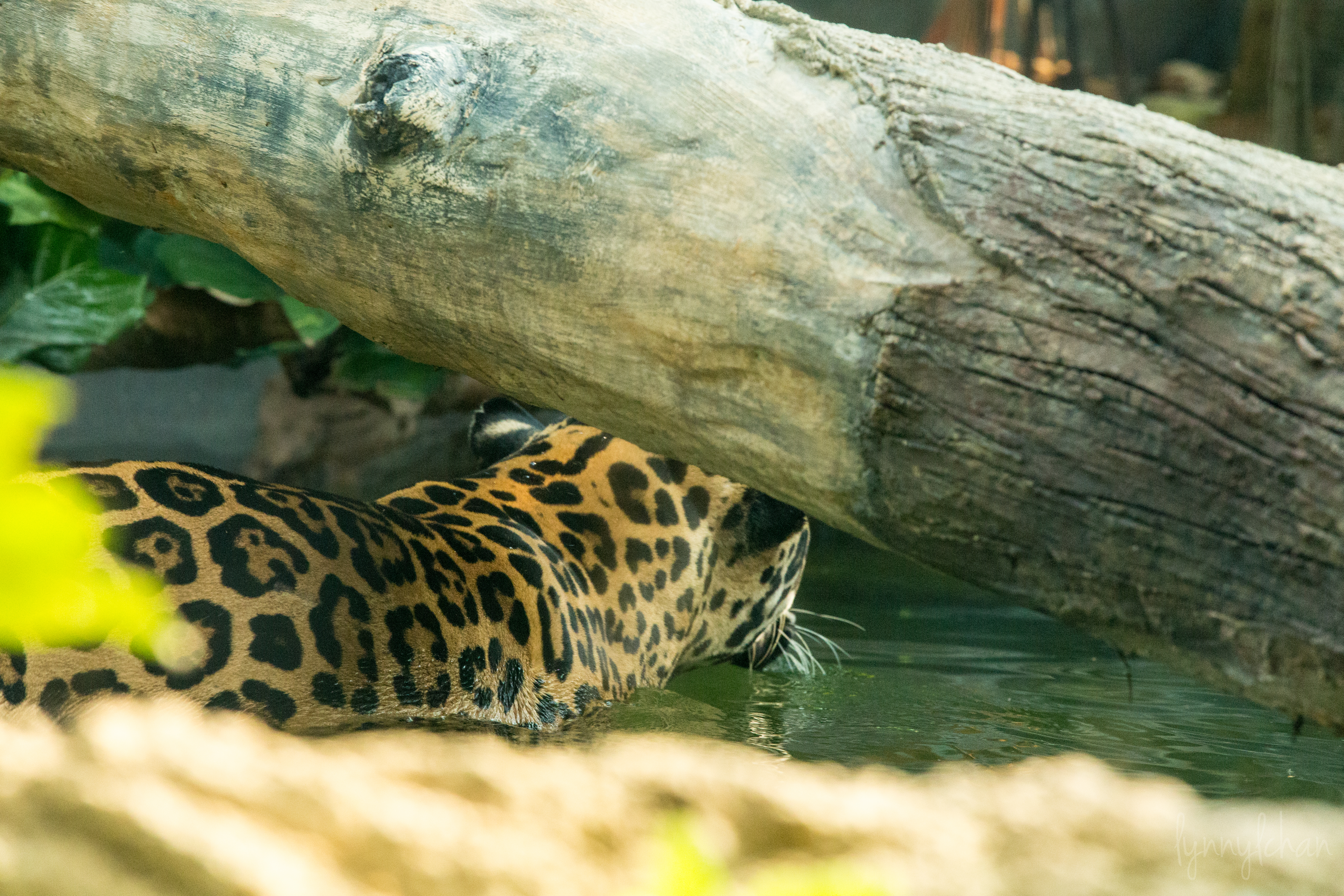
Jaguar

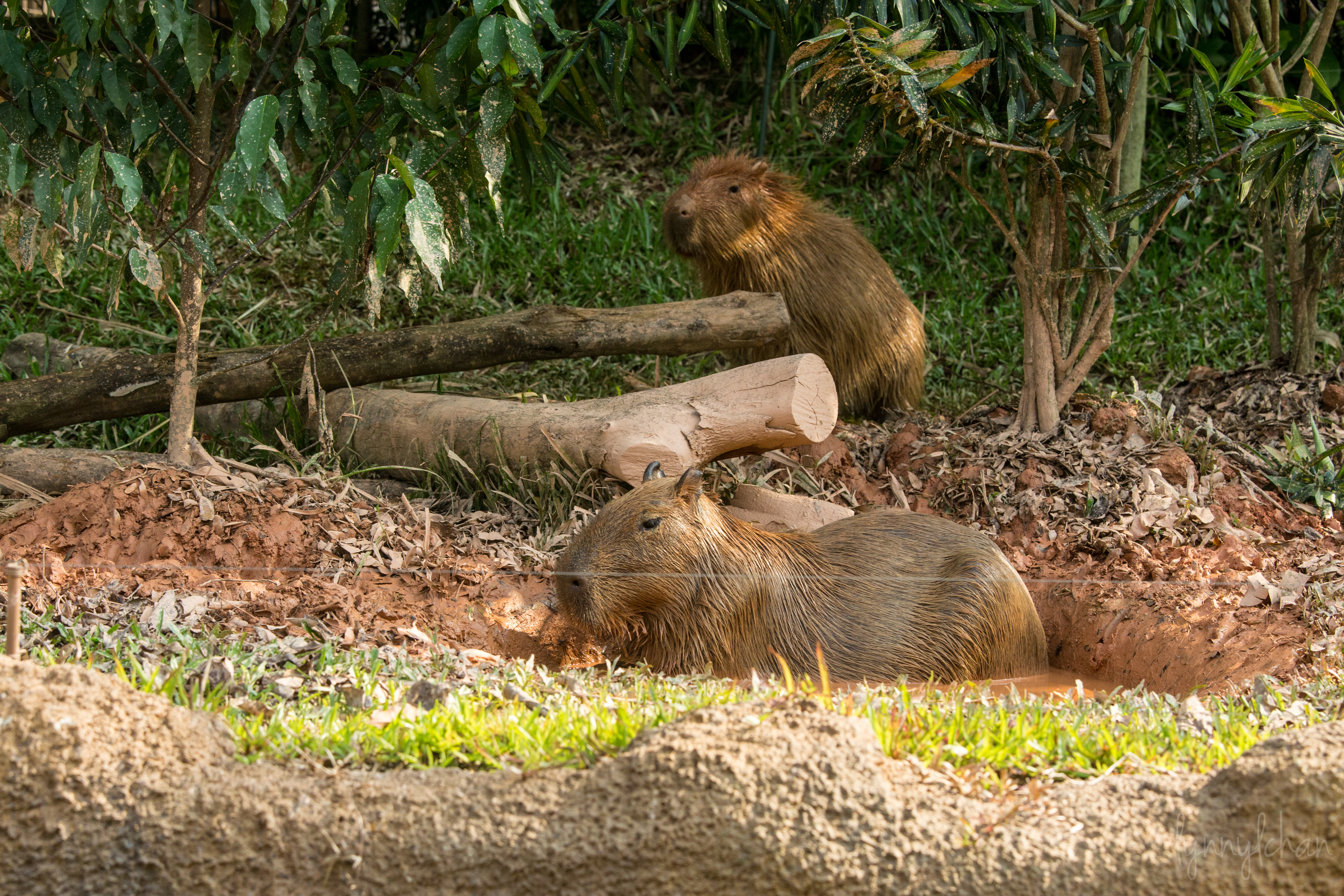
Capybara

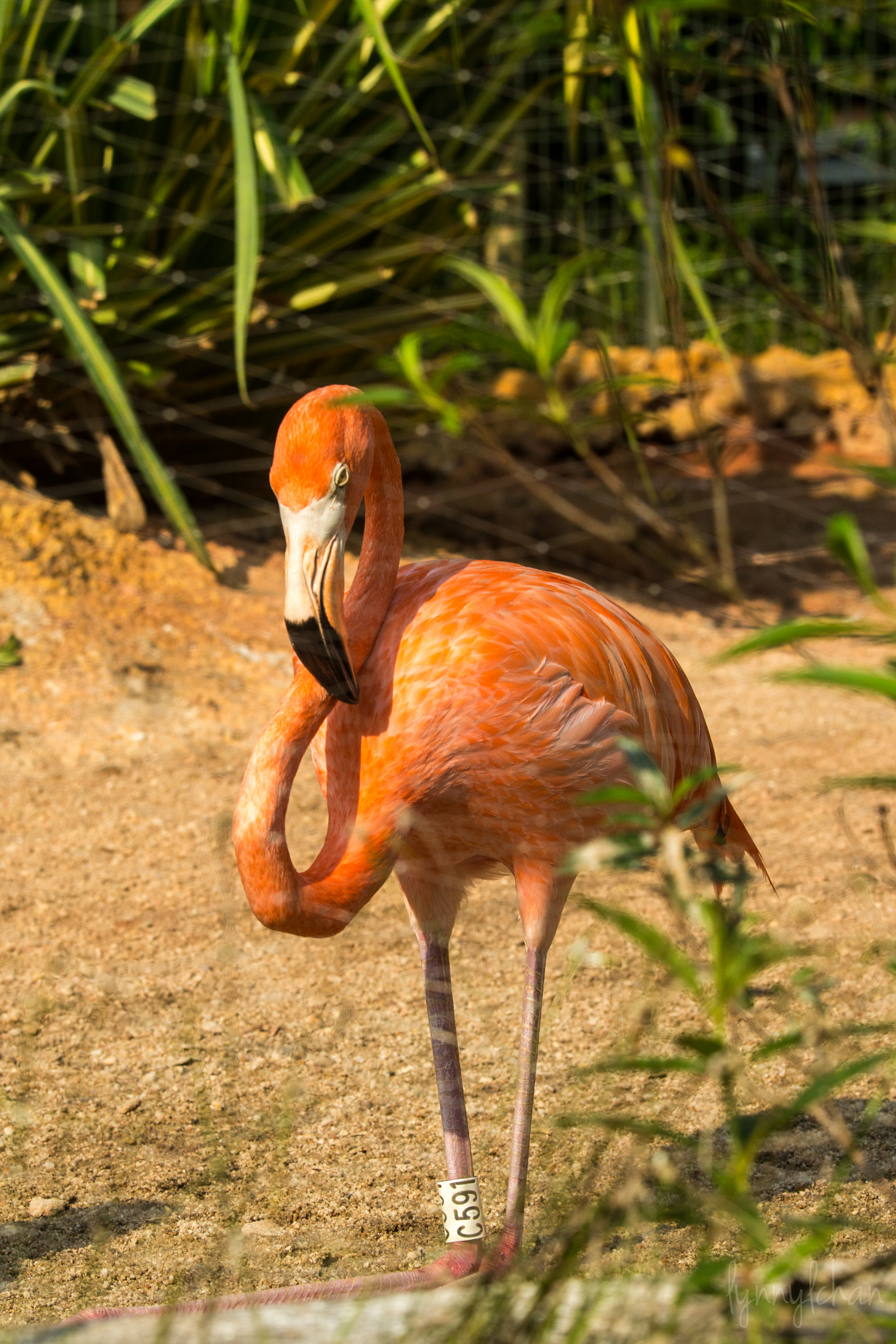
Caribbean flamingo

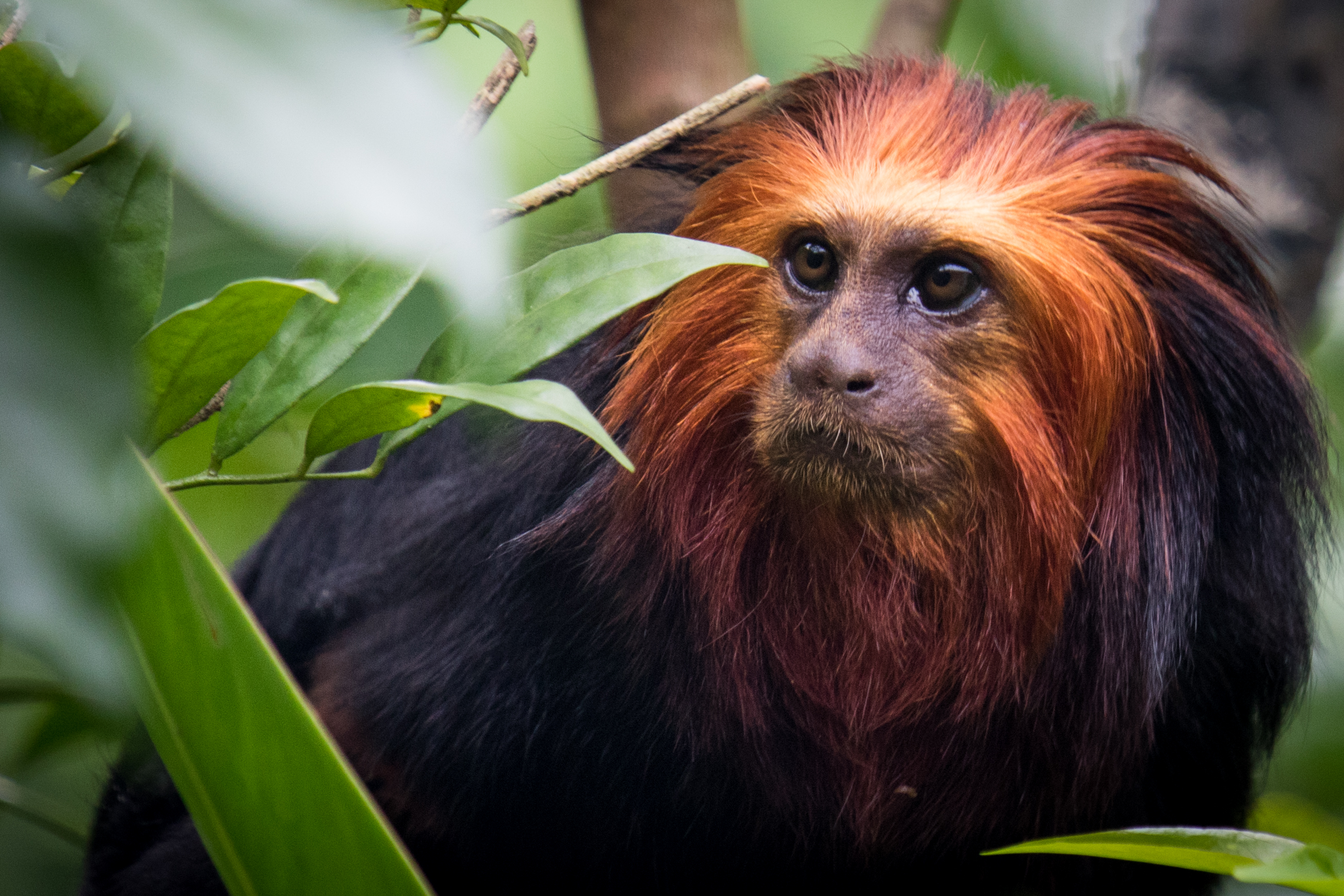
Golden-headed lion tamarin

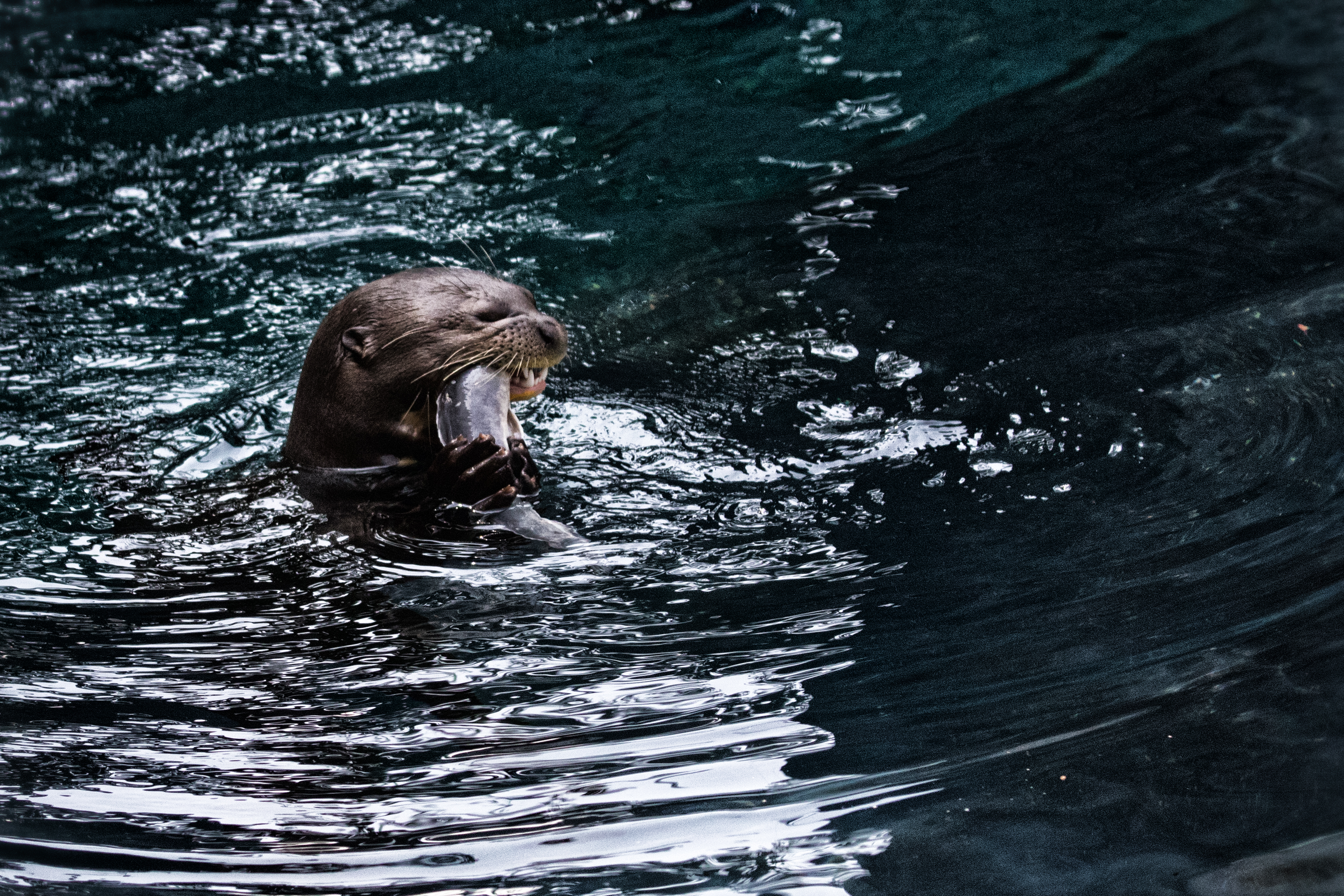
Giant otter

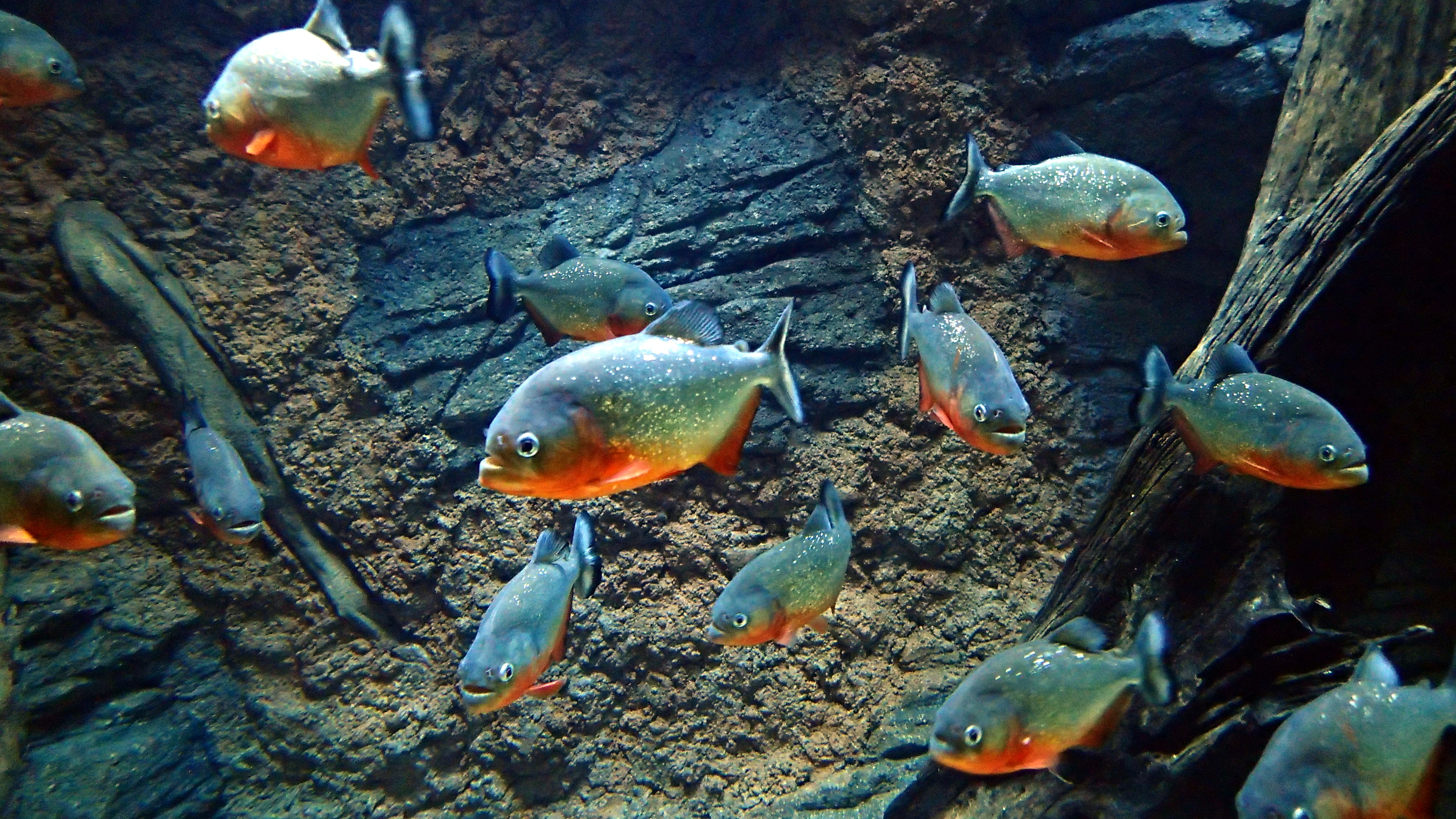
Red-bellied piranha

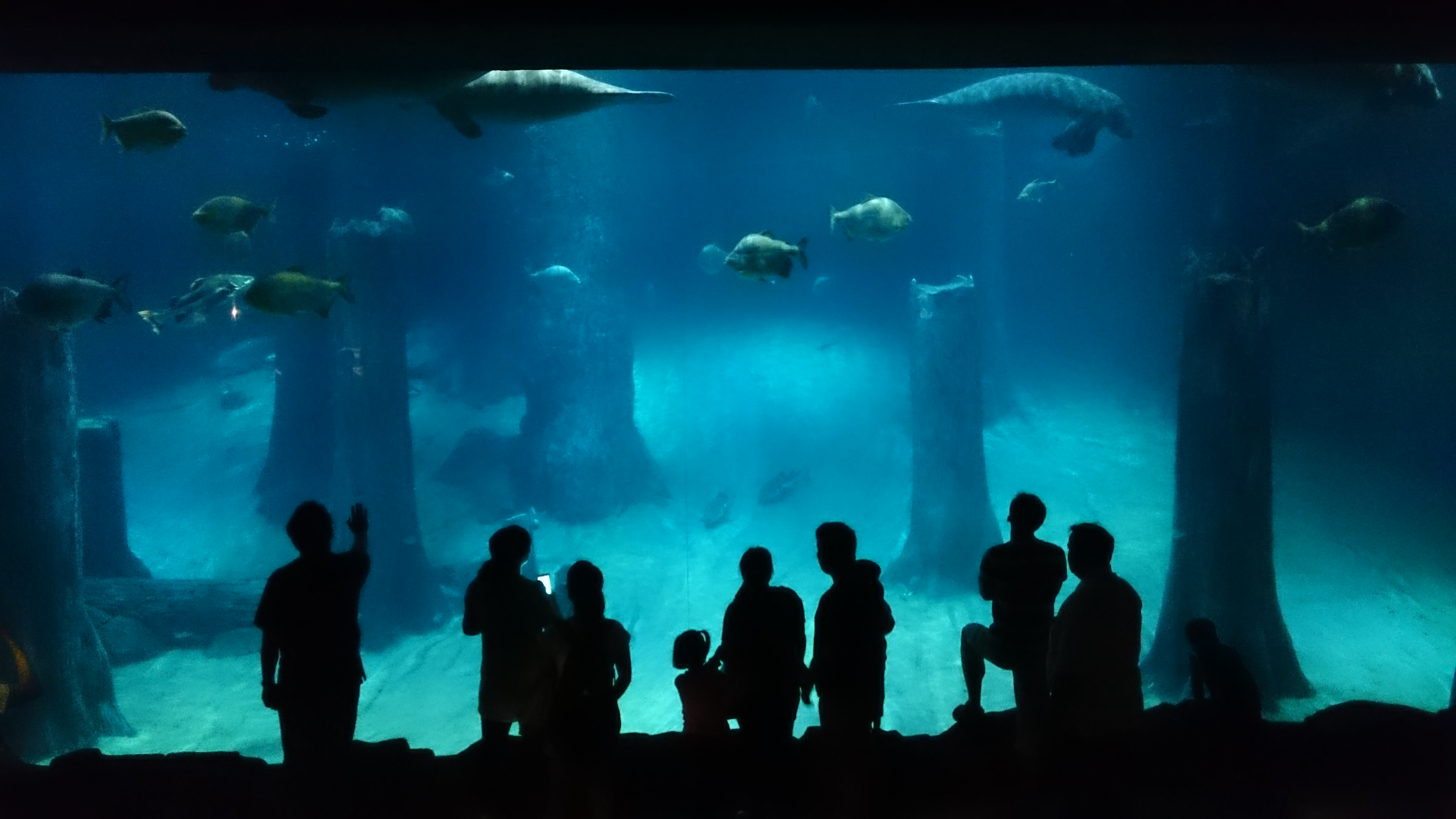
Amazon Flooded Forest

== Transportation ==
=== Public transportation ===
River Wonders is not served directly by MRT line, with the nearest station being the Springleaf MRT station.

There are two bus services operated by SBS Transit and SMRT Buses which call at the bus stop near to the zoo.

=== Bus ===
The Mandai Shuttle service plies daily between Khatib MRT station and the Zoo. A one-way trip costs $1 for everyone above the age of three. A separate service, the Mandai Express, operates on selected weekends and holidays to and from three locations in Bedok, Sengkang, and Tampines. A one-way trip costs between $1 and $3 for everyone above the age of three.

As of April 2023, the Mandai Shuttle has been taken over by free shuttle services. Pickup is still from Khatib MRT station.

== See also ==
- Underwater World, Singapore
- Marine Life Park
