= Alestes macrophthalmus =

- Preserved specimen; Royal Museum for Central Africa

Conservation status
- Least Concern (IUCN 3.1)

Scientific classification
- Kingdom: Animalia
- Phylum: Chordata
- Class: Actinopterygii
- Division: Teleostei
- Order: Characiformes
- Family: Alestidae
- Genus: Alestes
- Species: A. macrophthalmus

Binomial name
- Alestes macrophthalmus Günther, 1867

Synonyms
- Alestes macrophthalmus tanganicae Hoedeman, 1951; Alestes macrophthalmus tanganiica Hoedeman, 1951

Species of African freshwater fish

Alestes macrophthalmus, commonly known as the torpedo robber, ablette, or silversides (a name shared with other Alestes), is a species of freshwater fish belonging to the family Alestidae, the African characins or African tetras. It was described in 1867 from a holotype now deposited in the Natural History Museum, London.

Alestes macrophthalmus measures up to 60 cm (24 in) standard length, and weigh up to 2 to 2.5 kg (4.4 to 5.5 lb); it is the largest species of Alestes. The body is generally silvery, with a blueish to greenish back and white belly; an example of countershading.

The torpedo robber possesses adipose eyelids and subtle sexual dimorphism in the shape of their anal fin, like various other alestids. They lack spines supporting the fins, though some sources state 3 spines are present on the anal fin. Compared to its relatives, the species possesses fewer gill rakers, the dorsal fin origin emerges at the same "level" as the anal fin's, and there are more branched fin rays in the anal fin compared to Alestes liebrechtsii, which otherwise closely resembles A. macrophthalmus.

The species ranges throughout the Congo Basin (though not the Lower Congo), and is also found in Lake Tanganyika, along with the Malagarazi, Rusizi, and Quanza Rivers. Though the Tanganyikan population was considered to be its own subspecies, Alestes macrophthalmus is currently thought to lack subspecies, being monotypic.

Alestes macrophthalmus is considered pelagic, inhabiting rivers and lakes, often in the vicinity of a river delta. Due to this, it is threatened by habitat degradation from human activity near and around rivers, though part of its range lies within protected areas.

The torpedo robber is omnivorous: individuals of all ages feed on aquatic insects, such as chironomid larvae. Other insects such as beetles along with water lily (Nymphaea) are also known food items. Juveniles mainly subsist on psammon prior to reaching 50 mm (2.0 in) in length. Torpedo robbers transition to piscivory as they mature, with Engraulicypris, barbs, cichlids, and conspecifics being identifiable from their stomach content. This species is opportunistic, taking advantage of available prey items and periodic abundance.

Many populations undergo lateral migration for floodplain spawning, but the robbers inhabiting Lake Bangweulu spawn within the lake, in areas with sandy or rocky substrates. Spawning season lasts from July to March across the species, though peaks between August and February. The eggs are demersal and rest on the substrate, likely needing wave action or currents to remain viable. The Lake Bangweulu population reaches five years of age and a length of 340 mm (13 in). Various predatory fish species prey on the torpedo robber, being Serranochromis spp., Mormyrops, Clarias mossambicus, and notably the tigerfish Hydrocynus vittatus.

This species is fished commercially throughout its range.
