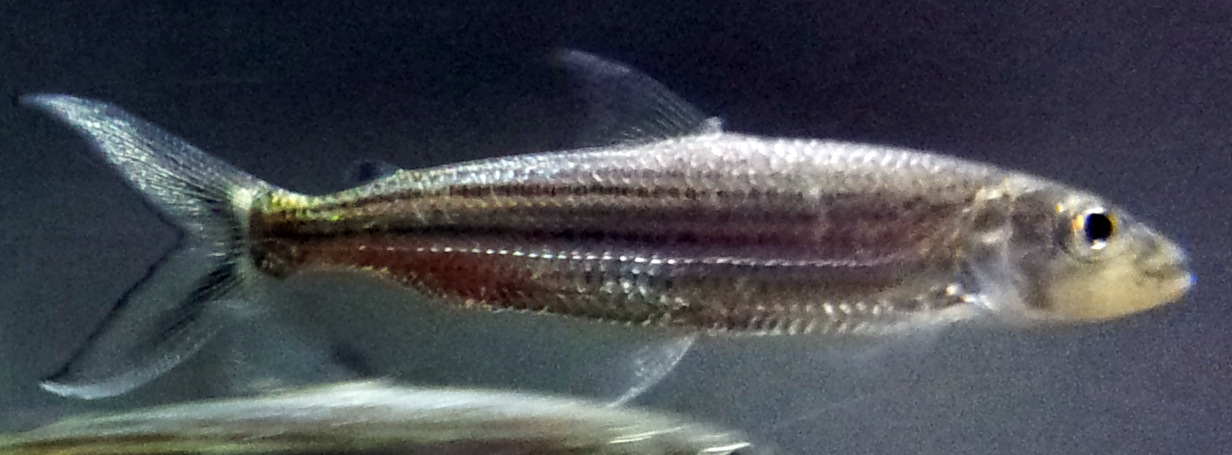

Conservation status
- Least Concern (IUCN 3.1)

Scientific classification
- Kingdom: Animalia
- Phylum: Chordata
- Class: Actinopterygii
- Division: Teleostei
- Order: Characiformes
- Family: Alestidae
- Genus: Hydrocynus
- Species: H. tanzaniae

Binomial name
- Hydrocynus tanzaniae Brewster, 1986

= Hydrocynus tanzaniae =

Species of fish

Hydrocynus tanzaniae, the blue tigerfish, is a large African predatory freshwater fish.

== Distribution ==
The eastward flowing rivers of Tanzania and in the Ruaha and Rufiji river systems.

== Description ==
Hydrocynus tanzaniae is a large, predatory fish. It has pronounced dentition similar to those found in Hydrocynus forskahlii. The holotype was nine and a half inches long (247mm), but specimens have been caught by fishermen greater than 27 inches (70 cm) and 25 pounds (11 kg). At a given length, H. tanzaniae has a deeper body than either H. forskahlii or H. vittatus. These fish are a silvery grey color and often have pronounced stripes. They often have markings in blue, black, pink, green and red, making them among the more colorful of African tiger fish. Uniquely among the African tiger fish, they have a blue adipose fin (other species have a black adipose fin).
