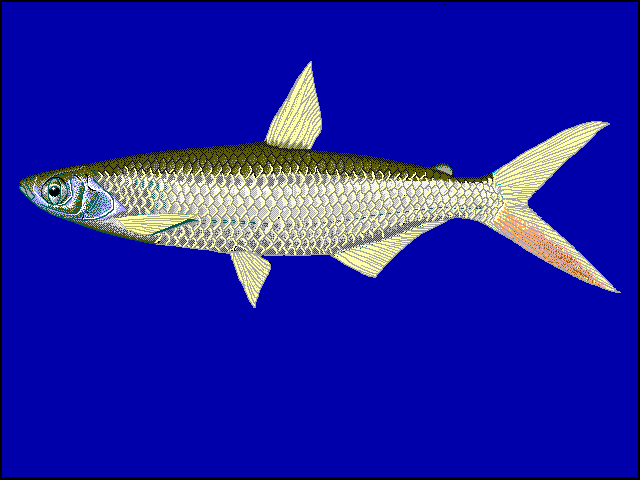
- Alestes baremoze

Scientific classification
- Kingdom: Animalia
- Phylum: Chordata
- Class: Actinopterygii
- Division: Teleostei
- Order: Characiformes
- Family: Alestidae
- Genus: Alestes; J. P. Müller & Troschel, 1846

Type species
- Salmo niloticus Linnaeus, 1758

Species
- See text.

Synonyms
- Alestiops Hoedeman, 1951

= Alestes =

Genus of fishes

Alestes is a genus of freshwater ray-finned fishes belonging to the family Alestidae, the African characins. As suggested by the name, the Alestidae was formerly included in Characidae before that family was limited to South American fish. Myletes was a synonym of Alestes, which was also used for various South American serrasalmids but this name was suppressed by Opinion 1813 of the ICZN.

Within the Lake Chad basin, Alestes and Hydrocynus, collectively known as salanga, are lightly smoked and dried.

== Species ==
There are currently seven recognized species in this genus:

- Alestes ansorgii Boulenger, 1910
- Alestes baremoze (Joannis, 1835) (Silversides)
- Alestes dentex (Linnaeus, 1758) (Characin)
- Alestes inferus Stiassny, Schelly & Mamonekene, 2009
- Alestes liebrechtsii Boulenger, 1898
- Alestes macrophthalmus Günther, 1867 (Torpedo robber)
- Alestes stuhlmannii Pfeffer, 1896
