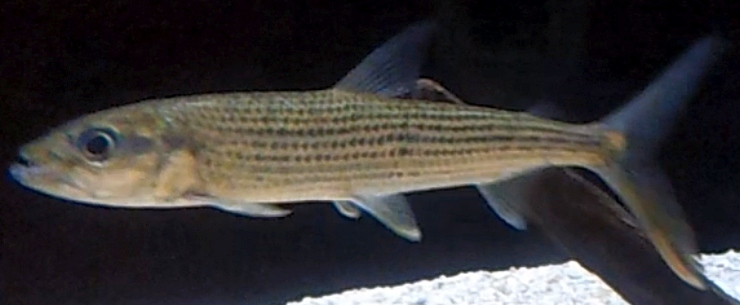

Conservation status
- Least Concern (IUCN 3.1)

Scientific classification
- Kingdom: Animalia
- Phylum: Chordata
- Class: Actinopterygii
- Order: Characiformes
- Family: Alestidae
- Genus: Hydrocynus
- Species: H. forskahlii

Binomial name
- Hydrocynus forskahlii (Cuvier, 1819)

Synonyms
- Hydrocyon forskahlii Cuvier 1819; Salmo roschal Walbaum, 1792 Nomen oblitum; Hydrocyon lineatus Schlegel, 1863

= Hydrocynus forskahlii =

Species of fish

Hydrocynus forskahlii, the elongate tigerfish, is a species of predatory characin from the family Alestidae which is found in northern and western Africa.

== Description ==
Hydrocynus forskahlii has pronounced stripes along the length of the body. There are two scales between the pelvic fin insertion and the lateral line, less than for other species of tigerfish such as Hydrocynus brevis which has 23-5 scales in the same position. The lateral line scale count is between 46 and 53 scales and the anal fin ray count is 3 soft, unbranched rays with 11-14 branched rays. It is a slenderer species than other Hydrocynus and the depth of the body averages 22.6 per cent of its length and the head averages around 20 per cent of the body length. It has 9 to 14 teeth in the upper jaw and 8 to 12 in the lower jaw and the jaws are frequently short and upturned. They are similar in colour and pattern to Hydrocynus vittatus being bright, silvery white in color, but with a grayish tail that has red, orange or yellow colour only on its lower lobe.

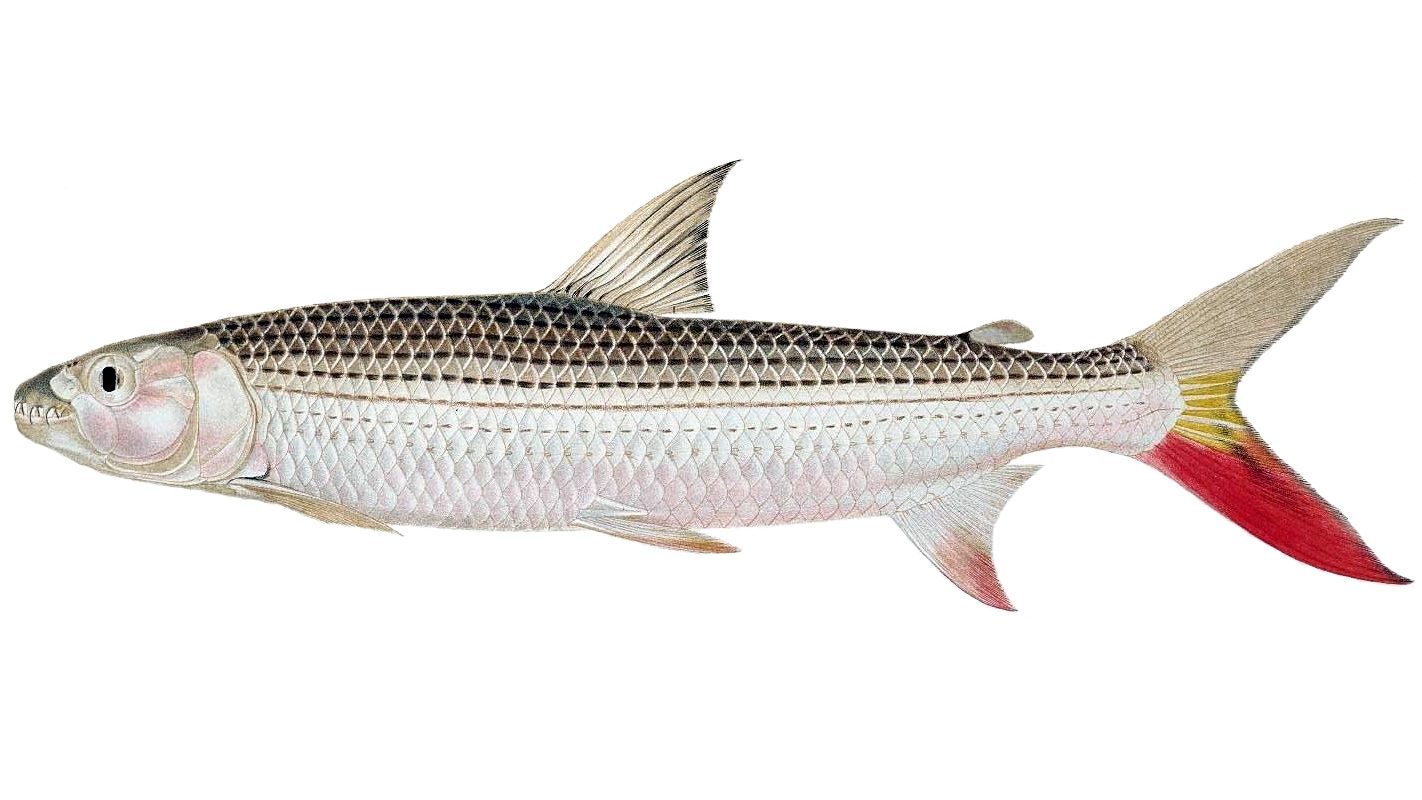
Illustration from Fishes of the Nile by George Albert Boulenger 1907

They are normally less than 30 cm in length, although large specimens may be 45 cm and they normally weigh about 2.3 kg, the world record rod caught specimen was 4.08233 kg. Although a maximum weight of 15.5 kg has been reported.

== Distribution ==
Hydrocynus forskahlii is found in central Africa in Lake Albert, Lake Turkana and Lake Gandjule and in the Congo River, Omo River and Nile. In West Africa it occurs in the Chad Basin, Niger River, Benue River west to the Senegal River and River Gambia. It is also present in coastal river basisn and in the Cross River basin, Wouri River and Sanaga River. In some basins it is sympatric with Hydrocynus brevis.

== Habitat ==
Hydrocynus forskahlii is a pelagic, potamodromous species of open water, it prefers the well oxygenated surface waters.

== Ecology ==
Little known, the sources quoted in Fishbase and the IUCN Red List of Threatened Species for the behaviour of Hydrocynus forskahlii appear to refer to Hydrocynus vittatus in Lake Kariba. The West African pike characin Hepsetus odoe avoids competition with and predation by Hydrocynus forskhali by showing a preference for the upper courses of rivers where H. forskahli is less abundant or is absent. In Lake Kainji, Nigeria, Hydrocynus forskahlii preys mainly on small clupeiforms however the largest specimens feed more heavily on the characid Alestes baremoze.

== Taxonomy and naming ==
Hydrocynus forskahlii was previously considered synonymous with Hydrocynus vittatus sensu lato, hence the confusion mentioned under Ecology above, but this view is not supported by recent molecular studies. In fact, it is suggested that there are two species within the lineage currently recognised as H. forskahlii, with the newly identified lineage being confined to the Sanaga River.

The generic name Hydrocynus is from the Greek hydro meaning water and kyon meaning dog and is a direct translation of the Egyptian Arabic name for this species Kelb el bahr, or water dog. The specific name commemorates the Swedish explorer and naturalist Peter Forsskål.

== Economic importance ==
Hydrocynus forskahlii is preserved by salting, especially in Upper Egyptian Nile, but most are now imported as salted fish from Sudan. Tigerfish are rare in the aquarium trade but this species is the most commonly traded and kept species. As Hydrocynus forskahlii is a commercially important species it suffers from heavy fishing pressure. In addition it is threatened by dams, water pollution, groundwater extraction and drought.
