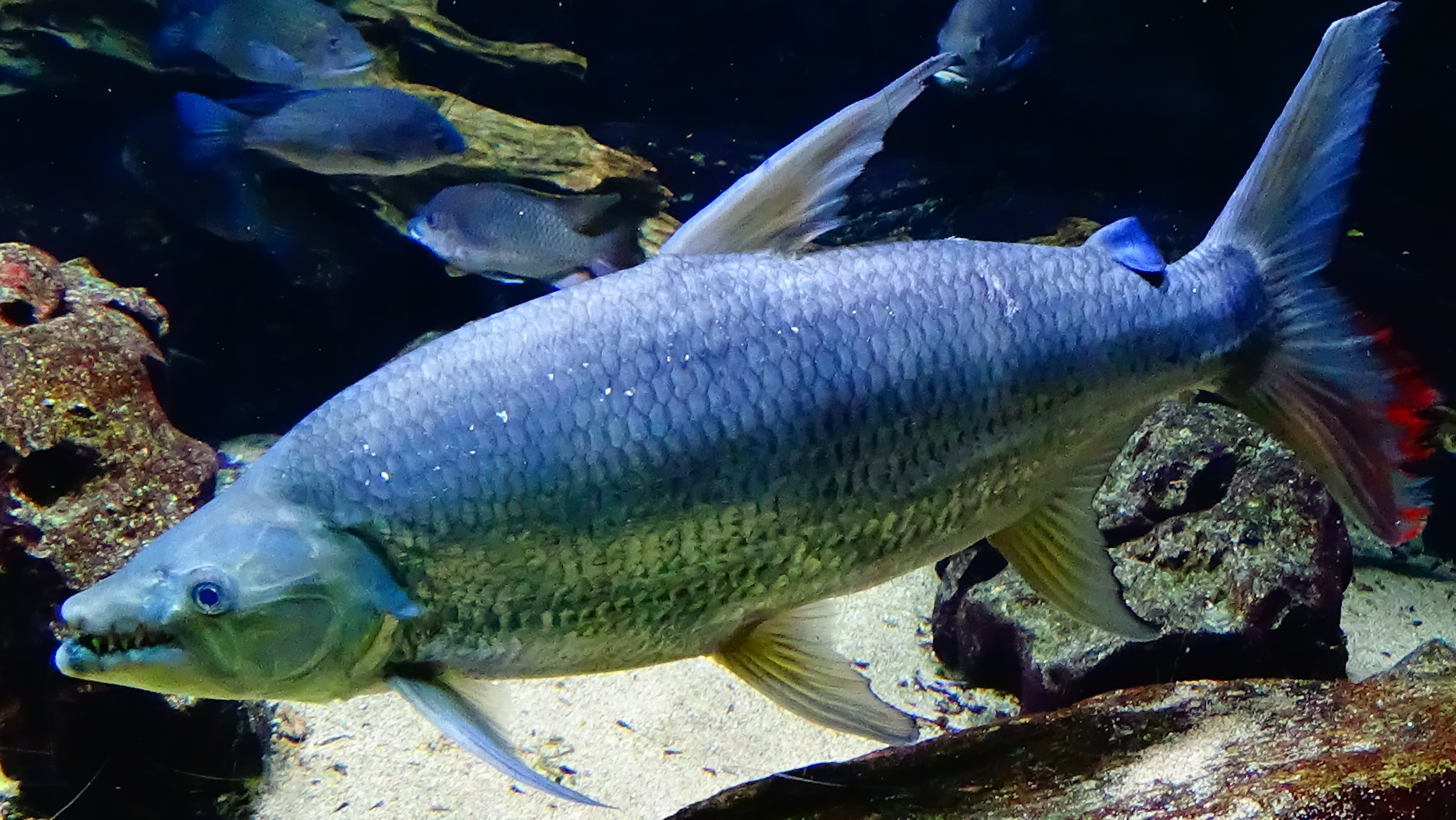
- In the Aquarium tropical de la Porte Dorée

Conservation status
- Least Concern (IUCN 3.1)

Scientific classification
- Kingdom: Animalia
- Phylum: Chordata
- Class: Actinopterygii
- Division: Teleostei
- Order: Characiformes
- Family: Alestidae
- Genus: Hydrocynus
- Species: H. goliath

Binomial name
- Hydrocynus goliath (Boulenger, 1898)
- Distribution of Hydrocynus goliath

Synonyms
- Hydrocyon goliath Boulenger, 1898; Hydrocyon vittiger Boulenger, 1907; Hydrocynus vittiger (Boulenger, 1907)

= Hydrocynus goliath =

Species of fish

Hydrocynus goliath, commonly known as the goliath tigerfish, giant tigerfish, or mbenga, is a large species of African predatory freshwater fish in the family Alestidae. It is native to the Congo River Basin and Lake Tanganyika in Africa.

== Distribution ==
The goliath tigerfish is one of five recognized African species of the Hydrocynus genus and is found in the Congo River Basin (including Lualaba River and Lake Upemba), and Lake Tanganyika. The type locality is the city of Mbandaka in the Main Congo, where it was discovered in 1898 by French explorer Boulenger. They are typically found in highly oxygenated fast-flowing waters such as those found in deep river channels and open lakes, making them strong swimmers able to capture prey even in turbulent waters.

A 2011 study which reconstructs the phylogenetic history of genus Hydrocynus using comparisons of a protein-coding gene called cytochrome b, revealed several mtDNA clades in this region, suggesting a higher tigerfish species richness than traditionally recognized. The study's analyses indicate that populations of H. goliath may have been prevented from upstream dispersal in the geologic past by knickpoints, or sharp changes in the channel bed slope, in the Luvua river. This prevention of upstream dispersal would restrict H. goliath to the Congo River Basin as reflected in the modern range of the species. Four additional species (H. vittatus and three unknown species) appear to be present in this Basin, while two (H. vittatus and an unknown species) appear to be present in Lake Tanganyika.

Based on the study's sequence comparisons, H. goliath possesses low nucleotide diversity, suggesting that existing populations originate from a historically small effective population which underwent rapid population growth at some point in the past. Additionally, a high haplotype diversity value indicates that its expansion may have undergone a more recent expansion in its population range and size.

== Description ==
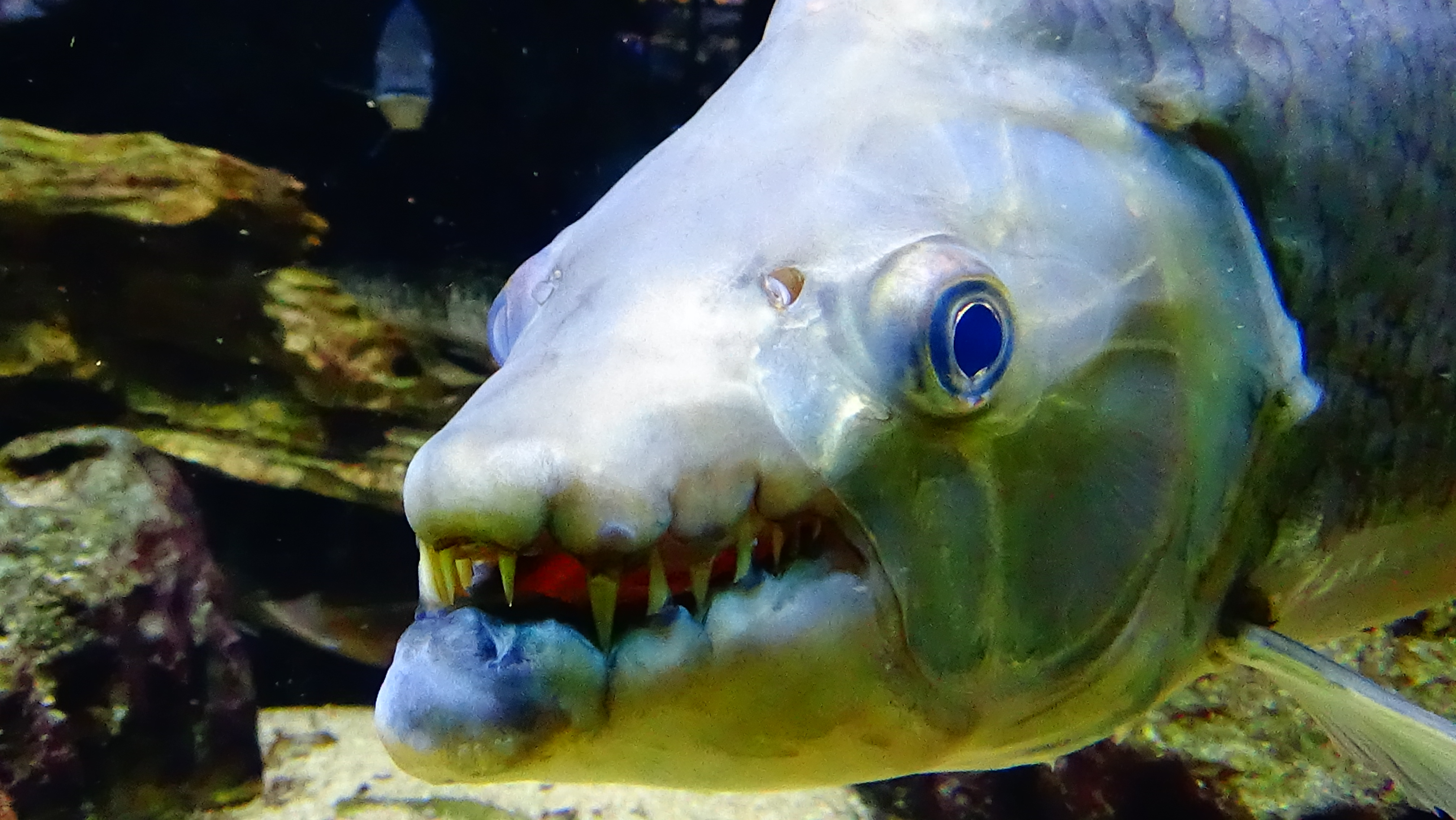
Teeth of H. goliath

The goliath tigerfish has a characteristic silvery gray dorsum and flanks, with a thunniform body plan similar to that of tuna, featuring black adipose fins. The goliath tigerfish is described as the "Monster Fish of the Congo" by a 2008 documentary by National Geographic, a reflection of its monster-like qualities and of its perception by local people and hunters. This large-toothed, highly predatory fish grows to an average length of 1.5 m (4.9 ft) and a weight of 50 kg (110 lb). The largest recorded specimen weighed 70 kg (154 lb), and they can reach a maximum recorded length of about 2 m (6.6 ft), making them the largest of the tigerfish of genus Hydrocynus.

In addition to being the largest in body size of their genus, they also have incredibly large conical teeth. Due to their predatory nature, they possess well-developed pharyngeal teeth similar to those of sharks and piranhas. Their teeth are spaced out along the jaw and shaped like daggers in order to facilitate biting pieces out of prey fish or tearing prey into smaller pieces for digestion. The premaxilla holds six to seven teeth while the dentary or lower jaw holds five, for a total of 12 to 20 upper teeth plus 8 to 14 lower teeth. Its teeth fit into distinct grooves along its jaws, interlocking together with the smallest teeth found at the very back of the jaws. In each jaw quadrant, all teeth are replaced at the same time over the course of about five days. On average each of its teeth can grow up to 2.5 cm (1 in), according to biologist and television presenter Jeremy Wade, which is comparable to the tooth size of a Great White shark. These massive jaws and teeth are what sets this species apart from all other tigerfish of the genus Hydrocynus and make for easy identification, especially given its endemism to the Congo Basin.

== Reproduction ==
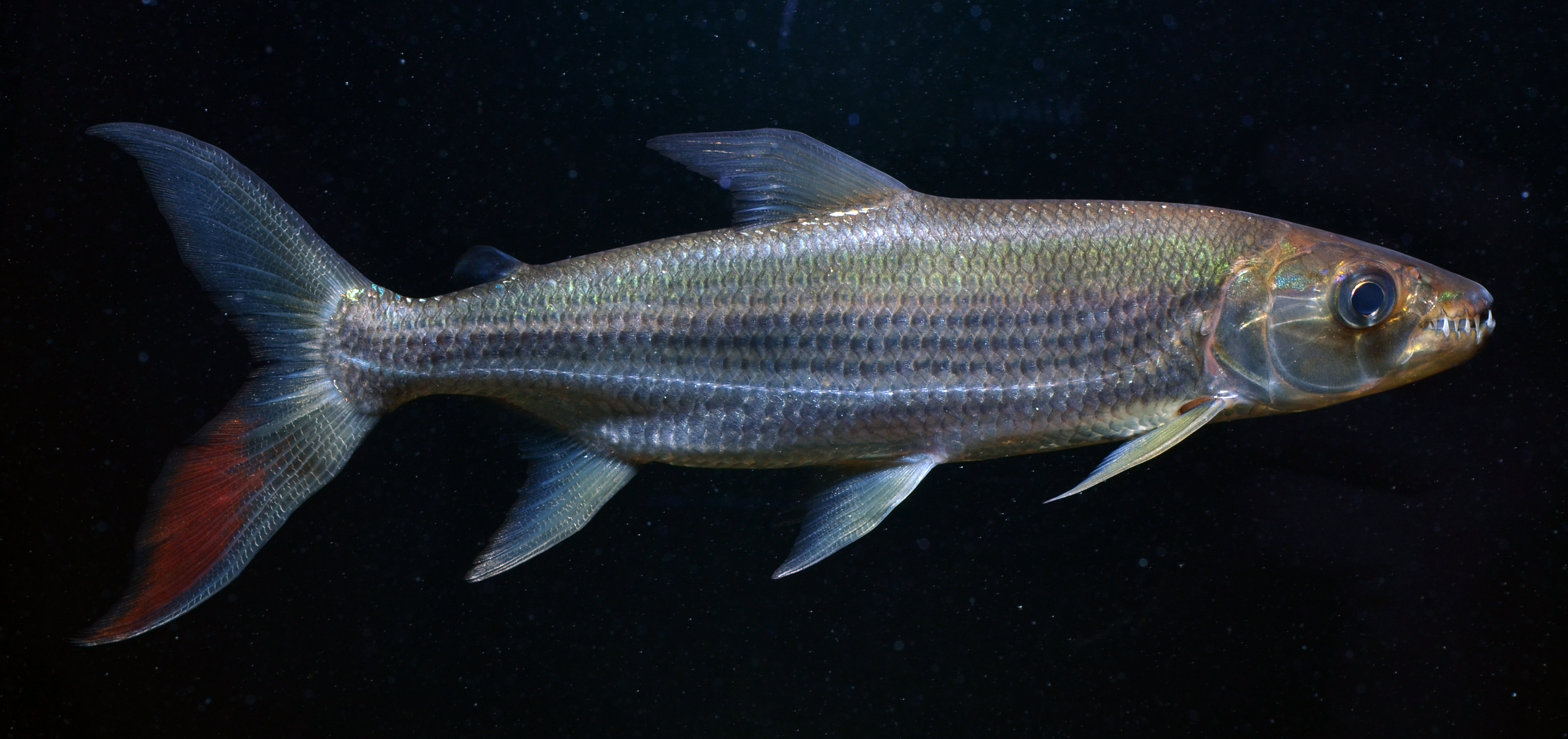
A juvenile individual of H. goliath

Despite being mostly solitary hunters, female goliath tigerfish migrate together and breed near each other on riverbanks or lakeshores. Thousands of eggs are laid among thick vegetation to protect the eggs and the young from predators, given that goliath tigerfish are not attentive parents. Infant fish feed on animal plankton during their larval stage before transitioning to small fish and eventually an adult diet of larger fish. Juvenile fish grow quite slowly, averaging four to six inches of growth per year. It can take up to ten years for a juvenile tigerfish to reach its full adult size.

== Diet ==
Hydrocynus goliath is a piscivore, feeding on any fish it can overpower, including smaller members of the same species. Their large, powerful, rigid teeth make them one of the most successful predators of the Congo basin, dangerous for the smaller fish they prey on as well as for the hunters who attempt to capture them for sport and for food. They have been known to attack larger animals, taking "chunks" out of large fish, crocodiles, and even humans.

When hunting, this fish uses the calmer eddies of the rapids to ambush its prey, using its keen sight to detect prey. When a target is noticed, the fish accelerates to chase it down. The Nile crocodile is the only known natural predator of mature goliath tigerfish. Humans are also considered predators as they hunt tigerfish for food and sport.

== Interaction with and significance to humans ==
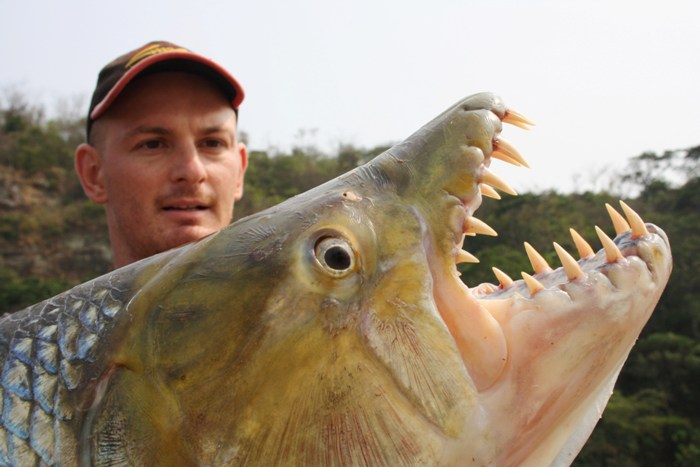
A goliath tigerfish captured by angling

A number of incidents have been reported in the Congo of this fish attacking humans. Hunters and fishermen in the Congo River Basin often spend entire days battling these fish. Its size and teeth make it difficult to capture, earning it the titles of “one of the world's greatest sports fishing challenges” and “the greatest freshwater gamefish in the world”.

Throughout the Congo, the goliath tigerfish is known by its native Swahilli name "mbenga," which translates to "dangerous fish." Native people believe the fish to be an evil spirit which is to be avoided, especially at the start of a journey on water.

The goliath tigerfish is one of many fishes that plays an important role in the diet and economy of African countries. In the Central African Republic, a study investigates how to manage infestations of Dermestes beetles in the dried fishes which are crucial for supplying protein to Central Africans. The study shows that tigerfish are susceptible to the development of Dermestes, with considerable losses to the fish product as it eats through the skin, lays larvae, and contaminates the fish as a food source. Infestation of dried fishes comes with financial loss for Central and South African economies, with an estimated annual loss of £750,000 in South Africa specifically. Dried fish carrying the Dermestes and their larvae can go on to damage timber, cotton, linen, and other materials. Though methods of prevention through traditional management of dried fishes were investigated, the development of the Dermestes subspecies found in dried tigerfish has not yet been effectively reduced.

In addition to pests, bacteria is commonly found in dried tigerfish. To combat this, many sellers use either traditional methods or toxic pesticides that increase the shelf life. Researchers recommend further study regarding the specific bacterial concentrations at each stage of the processing of dried fish, as well as training for the sellers regarding safer handling practices.

=== In the home aquarium ===
The goliath tigerfish is sometimes kept as a display fish in home aquarium setups. However, due to their enormous size, often times reaching over 2 meters (84 in) in length, they are not suitable, except among the most experienced fishkeepers with the ability to house them. The recommended size of such a tank setup would be around 15,000 l. They are predatory fish with razor-sharp teeth and are hostile to most other inhabitants. It's recommended to keep them alone or with larger and more boisterous species that can hold their own against the tiger fish. When feeding, this massive fish will strongly prefer live prey, making feeding them difficult.

== Conservation status ==
The current conservation status of the goliath tigerfish is unknown, but it is listed as "least concern" according to the IUCN Red List's 2010 assessment.
