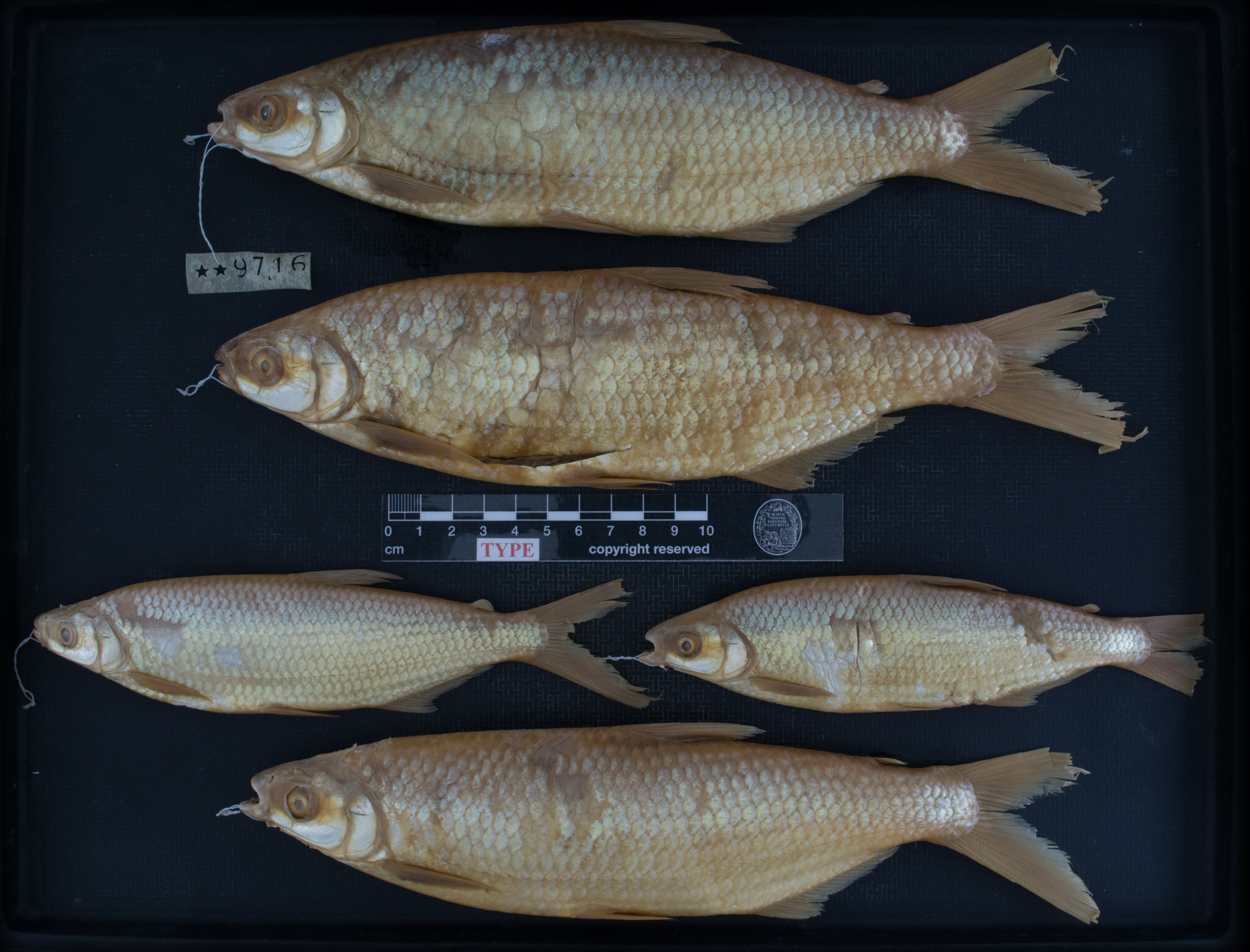

Conservation status
- Least Concern (IUCN 3.1)

Scientific classification
- Kingdom: Animalia
- Phylum: Chordata
- Class: Actinopterygii
- Division: Teleostei
- Order: Characiformes
- Family: Alestidae
- Genus: Alestes
- Species: A. dentex

Binomial name
- Alestes dentex (Linnaeus, 1758)

Synonyms
- Cyprinus dentex Linnaeus, 1758; Characinus niloticus Geoffroy St. Hilaire, 1809; Myletes hasselquistii Cuvier, 1818; Alestes sethente Valenciennes, 1850

= Alestes dentex =

Species of fish

Alestes dentex is a species of freshwater ray-finned fish belonging to the family Alestidae, the African tetras. It is found in Africa.

== Distribution ==
Alestes dentex is typically found in Central and West Africa. However, the species has also been found in Lake Turkana of the Kenyan Rift Valley, and Lake Albert of Uganda and the Democratic Republic of the Congo.

== Morphology ==
Specimens with a standard length of 41 cm have been observed.

== Diet ==
Alestes dentex is known to feed on seeds, zooplankton, and insects.
