= Epipsammon =

Communities of phytoplankton

The epipsammon is a type of ecological community consisting of non-motile phytoplankton species (mostly diatoms), which are very small in size (generally less than 20 μm) and live attached to sand grains. Cyanobacteria also contribute significantly to the total biomass of epipsammon. Because epipsammon may be periodically buried within the sediment, many species have physiological adaptations that allow them to tolerate low-light conditions and elevated sulfide concentrations, maintaining photosynthetic capacity during extended periods of darkness. Epipsammon have been reported to contribute significantly to the primary production of shallow sandy habitats and to serve as an important source of energy for secondary production.

== See also ==
- Psammon
