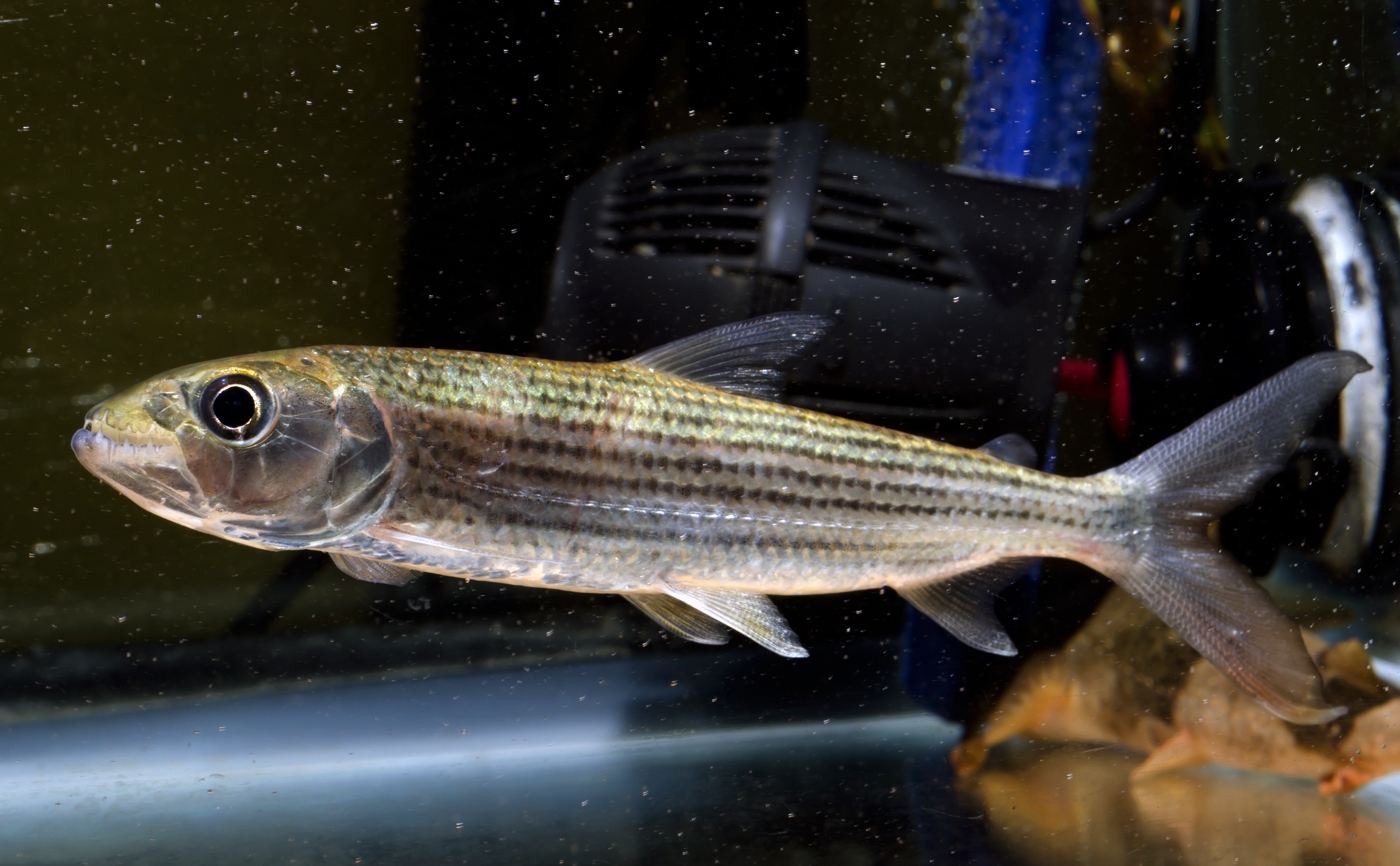
- Young Hydrocynus brevis specimen at approximately 6 inches (15 cm) in length.

Conservation status
- Least Concern (IUCN 3.1)

Scientific classification
- Kingdom: Animalia
- Phylum: Chordata
- Class: Actinopterygii
- Order: Characiformes
- Family: Alestidae
- Genus: Hydrocynus
- Species: H. brevis

Binomial name
- Hydrocynus brevis Günther, 1864

Synonyms
- Hydrocyon brevis Gunther, 18614; Hydrocyon somonorum Daget, 1954; Hydrocynus somonorum (Daget, 1954)

= Hydrocynus brevis =

Species of fish

Hydrocynus brevis, also known as the tigerfish, Nile tigerfish or Sahelian tigerfish, is a predatory freshwater fish distributed throughout northern Africa.

== Appearance ==
Hydrocynus brevis is silver in colour when young, with thin black horizontal stripes and an elongated body that tapers at both ends. As the fish grows, it will develop a bronze coloration and the stripes will fade. The ventral and caudal fins have a slight red-orange tint, and the adipose fin is grey to black. It grows to a length of 86 centimetres (34 in) SL.

== Distribution ==
Hydrocynus brevis has a wide distribution. It is found from Senegal to Ethiopia, throughout the Nile. In Northeast Africa it is found in the Ghazal and Jebel systems, Sudan, as well as Baro River, Ethiopia. In Western Africa it is known from Chad, Niger/Bénoué, Volta, Senegal and Gambia.

== Habitat and ecology ==
Hydrocynus brevis is a demersal, potamodromous freshwater species, Hydrocynus brevis prefers open-water habitats. It feeds mainly on fish and shrimps, with smaller individuals consuming aquatic insects.

== Population and conservation status ==
Hydrocynus brevis is rather common over most of its range, without any known widespread threats. There is, however, a conservation policy in place in Ghana, and one potential threat is overfishing, as well as deforestation and pollution. There currently is a lack of research regarding the population of the species and its range. Habitat maintenance and restoration may also be required.

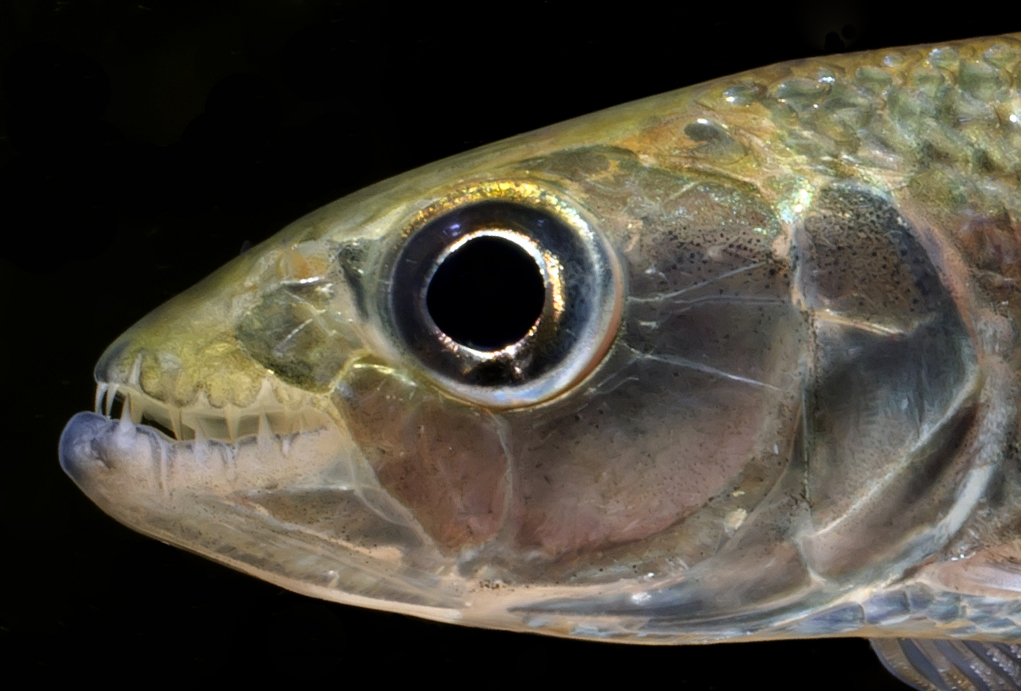
Head detail.
