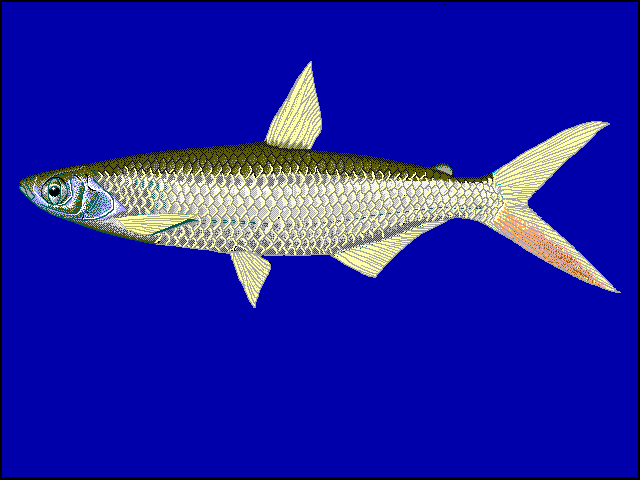

Conservation status
- Least Concern (IUCN 3.1)

Scientific classification
- Kingdom: Animalia
- Phylum: Chordata
- Class: Actinopterygii
- Order: Characiformes
- Family: Alestidae
- Genus: Alestes
- Species: A. baremoze

Binomial name
- Alestes baremoze (de Joannis, 1835)

Synonyms
- Myletes baremoze Joannis, 1835; Alestes kotschyi Heckel, 1847; Alestes (Alestes) wytsi Steindachner, 1870; Alestes splendens Werner, 1906; Alestes baremoze tchadense Blache, 1964

= Alestes baremoze =

Species of fish

Alestes baremoze, the pebbly fish or silversides, is a species of characin fish from the freshwater systems of northern and western Africa. It has some importance as a commercially exploited food fish.

== Description ==
Alestes baremoze is a silver-coloured fish with a bluish-grey dorsum and a white belly, the fins are greyish with an orange coloured lower lobe of the caudal fin. The maximum published length is 43 cm and the maximum published weight is 500g, although sexual maturity is reached at about 20 cm. It belongs to order Characiformes, family Alestidae, and genus Alestes. Histomorphological observations and stomach content analysis suggested that A. baremoze has morphological adaptations for omnivory

== Distribution ==
In eastern Africa it is found within Lake Albert, the White Nile and Lake Turkana. In Northern Africa Alestes baremoze was formerly distributed along the whole of the River Nile in Egypt, including the Nile Delta lakes, Rosetta Branch and Lower Nile, but it has now been confined to the upper Nile after the construction of the Aswan High Dam, and no longer occurs in northern Egypt. Alestes baremoze occurs in the Bahr el Ghazal River and Bahr el Jebel systems; the White and Blue Niles in Sudan, north to Lake Nasser. It has also been recorded in Ethiopia's Baro River. It is widespread in West Africa in the basins of Chad, Niger, Volta, Comoé, Bandama, Sassandra, Geba, Gambia and Senegal.

== Ecology ==
Alestes baremoze is mainly diurnal and is mainly found in the inshore zones of lakes, but is also shows potamodromous and benthopelagic behaviour. It is a rather generalist feeder with considerable flexibility in its diet, shifting from zooplankton to zoobenthos, detritus and macrophytes as the density of plankton declines. When breeding both sexes occur in sheltered bays on lake shores. Non breeding adults migrate upriver from lacustrine environments when the rivers are in flood, where they gather in shoals and feed.

== Nutrition ==
Alestes baremoze commonly known as Angara in Uganda is highly marketable and valued fish in Northern Uganda, South Sudan, Sudan and in the Democratic Republic of Congo. Many consumers, especially in the West Nile region appreciate the taste, special flavour and texture characteristics of this fish. Salting is not only a method to prolong shelf life, but a method to produce fish products that meet demand of consumers. The crude protein values of A. baremoze according to different sizes were reported to be in the range of (17–18%) and zinc was the most abundant micro element while potassium was found to be the macro-mineral with highest concentration.

In Lake Chad spawning takes place from in the late afternoon and evening, between 16:30-20:00 h. The eggs are shed in a single batch which represents 15% of the weight of female. When spawning the mature females are dispersed and do not form groups.

== Fisheries ==
Alestes baremoze is caught and salted in the Nile, especially in Egypt. On Lake Chad it is caught in seine nets and gill nets at different season.
