= Psammon =

Psammon (from Greek "psammos", "sand") is an ecological community of organisms inhabiting coastal sand. It consists of biota buried in moist sediments. Psammon is also sometimes considered a part of benthos due to its near-bottom distribution. Psammon term is commonly used to refer to freshwater reservoirs such as lakes.

== See also ==
- Epipsammon
