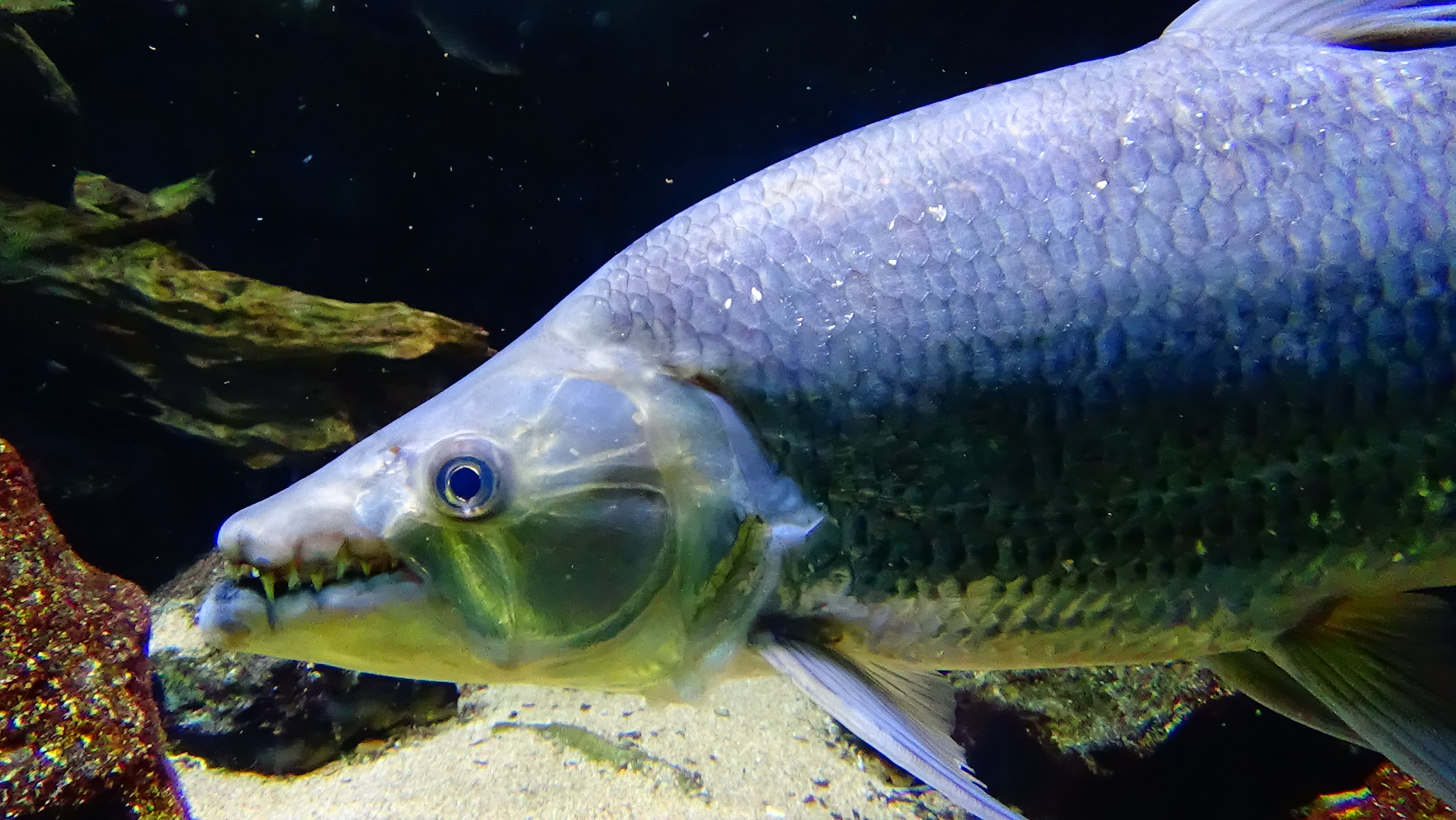
- Goliath tigerfish (H. goliath)

Scientific classification
- Kingdom: Animalia
- Phylum: Chordata
- Class: Actinopterygii
- Order: Characiformes
- Family: Alestidae
- Genus: Hydrocynus; Cuvier, 1816

Type species
- Hydrocynus lucius Cuvier, 1816

Species
- 5, see text.

Synonyms
- Hydrocionichthys Travassos, 1952

= Hydrocynus =

Hydrocynus Temporal range: Late Paleocene to present

Genus of fishes

Hydrocynus is a genus of Characin fish in the family Alestidae commonly called "tigerfish," native to Africa. The genus name is derived from Ancient Greek ὕδωρ ("water") + κύων ("dog"). The genus contains five species, all commonly known as "African tigerfish" for their fierce predatory behaviour and other characteristics that make them excellent game fish. Hydrocynus are normally piscivorous, but H. vittatus is proven to prey on birds in flight.

== Taxonomy ==
Hydrocynus was first proposed as a genus in 1816 by the French zoologist Georges Cuvier. In 1910 Carl Eigenmann designated Hydrocynus lucius as the type species of the genus, however, that name is a synonym of Boulengerella lucius, a Neotropical species which is classified in a different family. In 1952 Haroldo P. Travassos proposed the genus Hydrocionichthys with Hydrocynus forskahlii as its type species, as this genus is a junior synonym of Hydrocynus then H. forskahlii would be the type species of Hydrocynus. This may have to be ruled on by the International Commission on Zoological Nomenclature. This genus is classified in the African tetra family, Alestidae., in the order Characiformes.

== Evolutionary history ==
The earliest fossils which have been identified as belonging to Hydrocynus are dated to the Late Paleocene/Early Eocene of Algeria, and from the middle Eocene of Libya. Hydrocynus remains are also known from the Late Miocene, and have been found from the Chad, Maronga, Turkana and Semliki basins of northern and eastern Africa, in all of which Hydrocynus species still occur. The oldest lineage appears to be that of Hydrocynus goliath, while lineages of H. brevis and H. forskahlii diverged in the Late Miocene and Pliocene while the lineages which formed H. tanzaniae and the "vittatus complex" appear in the Pliocene.

== Species ==
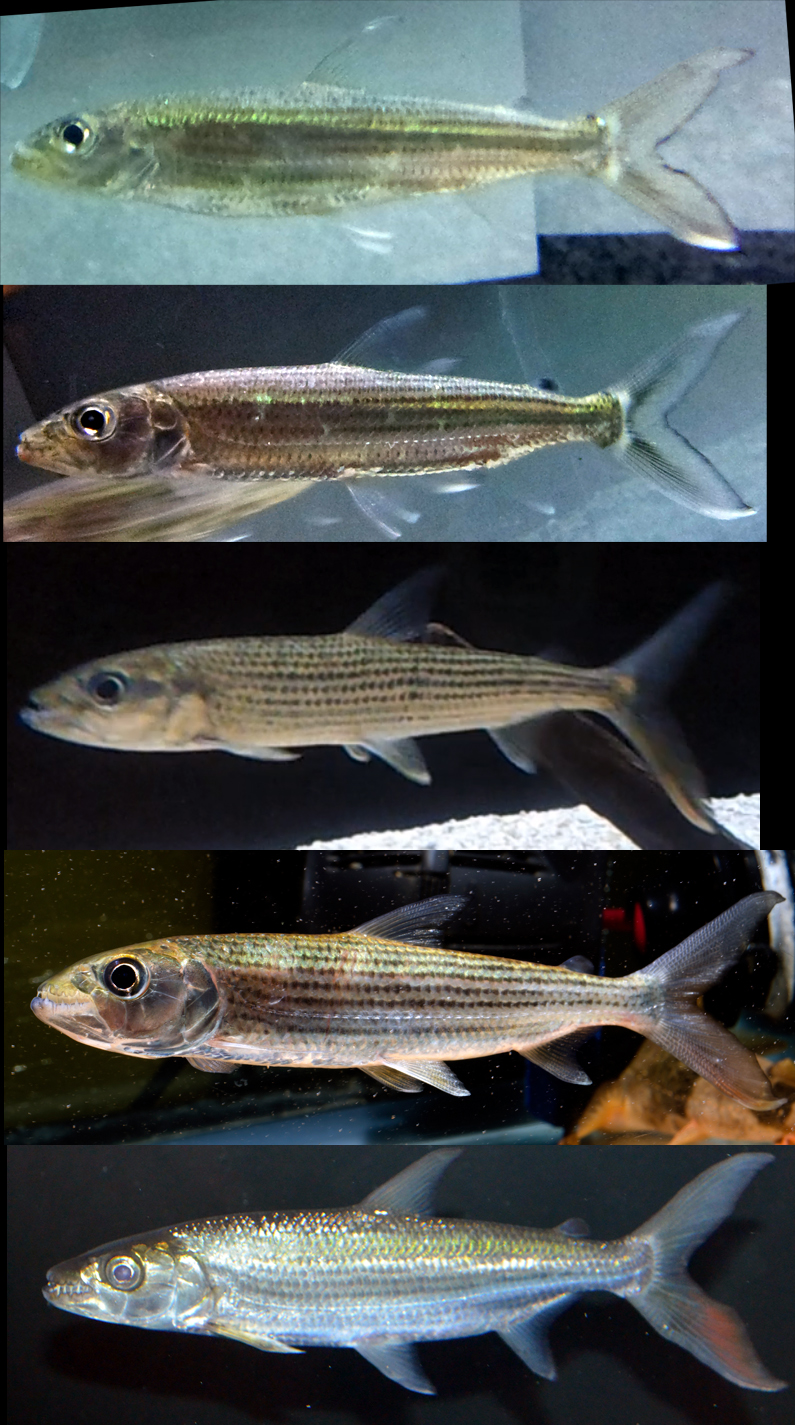
Juveniles of the five currently recognized species. From top to bottom: H. vittatus, H. tanzaniae, H. forskahlii, H. brevis and H. goliath

Hydrocynus contains the following valid species:

- Hydrocynus brevis (Günther, 1864) (Tigerfish)
- Hydrocynus forskahlii (Cuvier, 1819) (Elongate tigerfish)
- Hydrocynus goliath Boulenger, 1898 (Goliath tigerfish)
- Hydrocynus tanzaniae B. Brewster, 1986 (Blue tigerfish)
- Hydrocynus vittatus Castelnau, 1861 (Striped tigerfish)

== Economic importance ==
The different species of tigerfish are among the most important and popular game fish species in Africa and as a result they are an important asset to the various tourist industries. They are also one of the most important components of commercial freshwater catches in Africa.
