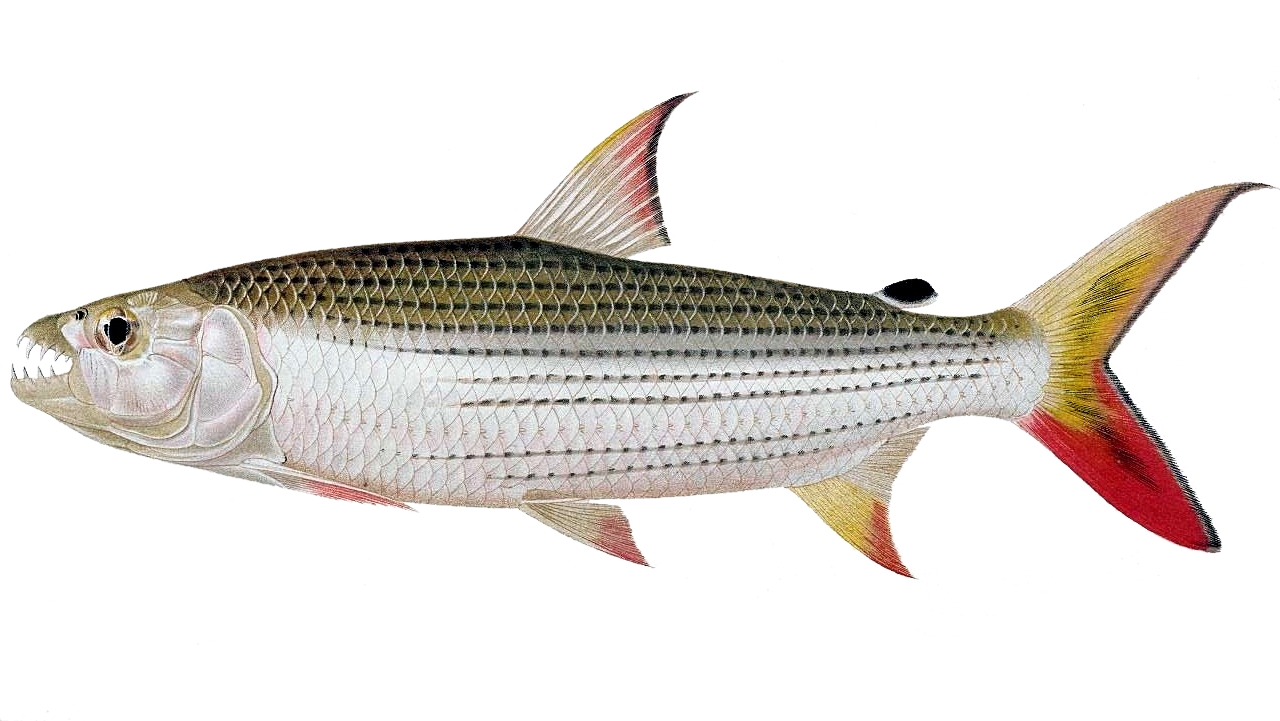

Conservation status
- Least Concern (IUCN 3.1)

Scientific classification
- Kingdom: Animalia
- Phylum: Chordata
- Class: Actinopterygii
- Order: Characiformes
- Family: Alestidae
- Genus: Hydrocynus
- Species: H. vittatus

Binomial name
- Hydrocynus vittatus (Castelnau, 1861)

Synonyms
- Hydrocyon vittatus Castelnau, 1861

= Hydrocynus vittatus =

African tiger fish

Predatory freshwater fish

Hydrocynus vittatus, the African tigerfish, tiervis or ngwesh is a freshwater fish distributed throughout much of Africa. This predatory fish is generally a piscivore but it has been observed leaping out of the water and catching barn swallows in flight.

== Nomenclature ==
Hydrocynus vittatus was first formally described as Hydrocyon vittatus in 1861 by the French naturalist François-Louis Laporte, comte de Castelnau with its type locality given as Lake Ngami in Botswana. The genus Hydrocynus is placed in the family Alestidae within the suborder Characoidei in the order Characiformes by the 5th edition of Fishes of the World. Some authorities place Hydrocynus in the subfamily Alestinae, but the 5th edition of Fishes of the World does not recognise subfamilies in the Alestidae.

The genus name, Hydrocynus, is a Greek compound word of hydro, meaning "water", and kyon, which means "dog". This is a calque of the Egyptian Arabic name for the type species of the genus, H. forskahlii, kelb el bahr (كلب البحر), meaning "water dog". This name refers to the predatory behaviours of the genus. The specific name, vittatus means "banded", an allusion to the blue horizontal stripes along the flanks of the African tigerfish.

== Description ==
Hydrocynus vittatus is overall silvery in colour, with thin black stripes running horizontally. It has an elongated body and a red, forked caudal fin with a black edge. Its head is large, as well as its teeth, of which there are eight per jaw. These are sharp and conical, which are used to grasp and chop prey. They are able to replace their teeth simultaneously on the upper and lower jaws. Males are larger and more "full-bodied" than females. It grows to a length of 105 centimetres (41 in) SL.

== Distribution ==
Hydrocynus vittatus has a distribution which covers the Niger/Bénoué, Ouémé River, Senegal River, Nile, Omo River, Congo River, Lufira, Lualaba River, Luapula, Zambezi, Limpopo River, Rovuma, Shire River, and Wami River; as well as various lakes: Lake Bangweulu, Mweru, Tanganyika, Upemba, Rukwa, and Malagarazi. It is also found in the Okavango Basin and lower reaches of coastal systems south to the Pongola River and in man-made Lake Kariba, Lake Jozini and Schroda Dam.

Hydrocynus vittatus is common and widespread over most of its range. In the most studied population, that of Lake Kariba on the Middle Zambezi River, the population fluctuated markedly, apparently in direct relation to the abundance of the introduced clupeid Limnothrissa miodon which forms a major part of its diet.

== Behaviour ==
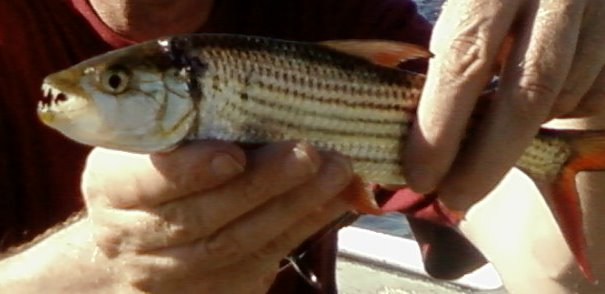
A small specimen from the upper Zambezi, near Livingstone

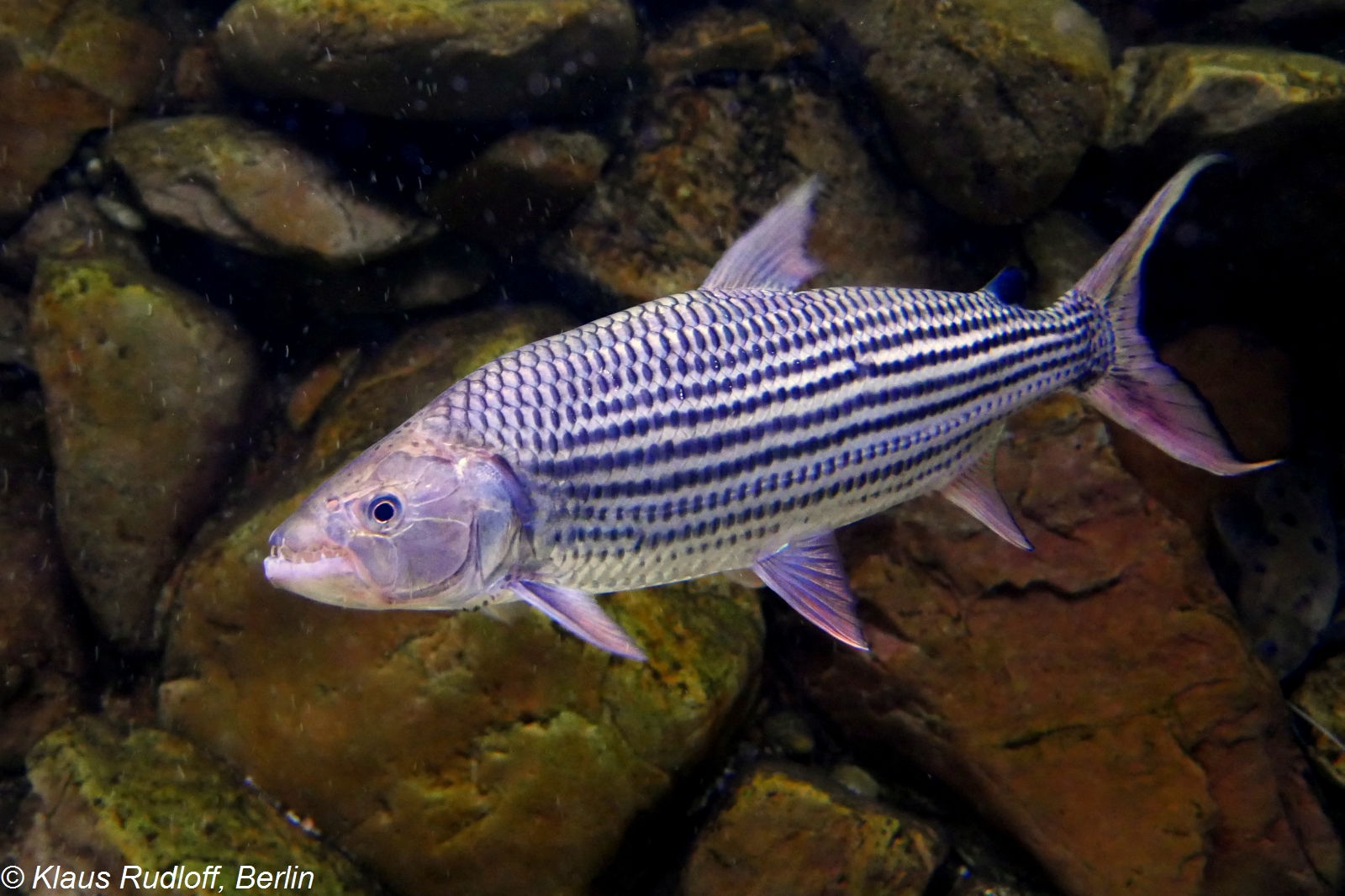
Mature specimen at Bojnice Zoo, Slovakia

Hydrocynus vittatus mainly live near the bottom of the large freshwater rivers and lakes they inhabit. During the day they tend to be found closer to the surface and then move towards the bottom at night. They thrive in highly oxygenated water in warm climates.

The breeding habits of this species are somewhat elusive but it is thought that spawning may take place over a couple of days during December or January. The timing depends on when the rivers and streams begin to swell due to the start of the rainy season. Females will lay their eggs in submerged vegetation in shallow water close to the shore. Hatchlings will remain in the safety of the vegetation until the water levels become low enough to force them further into the water. Smaller members of this species tends to school together, while larger tigerfish tend to live and hunt alone.

These fish may migrate up to 100 km (62 mi) within the stream or river they inhabit.

=== Feeding behaviour ===
Hydrocynus vittatus are fierce hunters and are mostly piscivorous, and tend to eat whatever fish is most available. Smaller fish will hunt in large schools, while larger African tigerfish hunt alone. Favoured prey fish include other African tetras (such as Brycinus and Micralestes), cichlids, gobies, barbels, carp, Limnothrissa, and clariid catfish. Insects, freshwater shrimp (Caridina), and zooplankton may also be part of the African tigerfish's diet, especially during juvenile stages of life.

A unique feeding behavior has been confirmed in the Schroda Dam population of Hydrocynus vittatus: the fish jump out of the water and catch barn swallows Hirundo rustica on the wing as they fly near the surface of the lake feeding on insects. This behaviour was speculated previously, but this was the first time it had been observed during the course of a research project. The researchers observed an average success rate of 25% for predation attempts, with as many as twenty birds caught per day over a relatively small lake (4,100,000 cubic metres (140,000,000 cu ft)). African tigerfish were observed to pursue the birds from the surface further below the water. The depth of pursuit will affect the fish's perception of the bird due to light refraction in the water. It is thought that these tigerfish will pursue the bird at a depth that allows the individual to perceive the birds the easiest. This instance is the only documented example of a freshwater fish exhibiting this particular behavior. Other freshwater fish have been observed catching birds that are swimming or floating on the water, but not catching them mid-flight.

== Relation to humans ==
Hydrocynus vittatus is an important food and income source for locals. Not only do they provide a natural source of protein, the presence of the fish also promotes tourism through sport fishing. As a result of their ecological and economic importance, African tigerfish have been extensively studied by conservation groups and university researchers. The total catch of the commercial fishery at Lake Rukwa has African tigerfish as 3.9% of the yield.

African tigerfish have declined in some southern African river systems as a result of pollution, water extraction and obstructions by dams and weirs that prevent migration. It is locally threatened by unregulated gillnet fisheries and has been placed on the South African protected species list. In east Africa, threats to populations include overfishing, reductions in water quality due to agricultural activities and deforestation, and pesticide pollution. According to the IUCN Red List of Threatened Species, tigerfish are of least concern with a wide distribution but are protected in some reserves.

=== Pet trade ===
Hydrocynus vittatus is occasionally kept in the aquarium trade because of its distinctive appearance. The species is generally considered unsuitable for most home aquariums and is recommended only for experienced aquarists with large freshwater aquariums. Adults can reach a large size and may require tanks of at least 2,400 L (530 imp gal; 630 US gal). The species is highly predatory and may attack or consume smaller tankmates. Larger individuals can also be difficult to handle because of their size, aggressive behavior, and large teeth.

Regulations regarding ownership and importation of H. vittatus vary by jurisdiction. In the United States, importation of the species is prohibited in Texas, Utah, and Florida.
