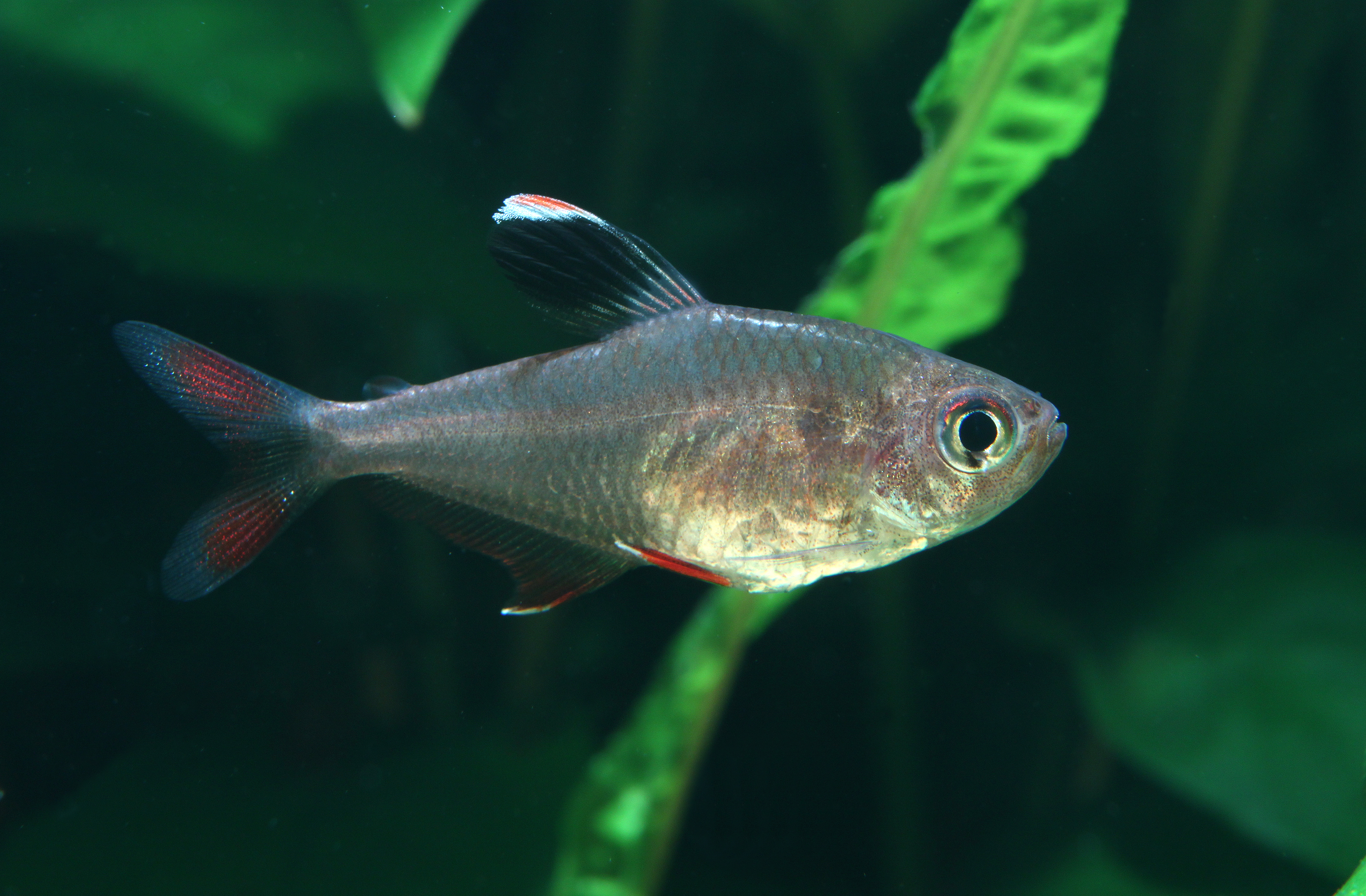
- Ornate tetra, Hyphessobrycon bentosi

Scientific classification
- Kingdom: Animalia
- Phylum: Chordata
- Class: Actinopterygii
- Division: Teleostei
- (unranked): Otophysi
- Order: Characiformes

Genera
- More than 150; Groups included: Acestrorhamphidae; Acestrorhynchidae; Alestiidae; Characidae; Lebiasinidae; Lepidarchidae; Stevardiidae

= Tetra =

Common name for several species of fish

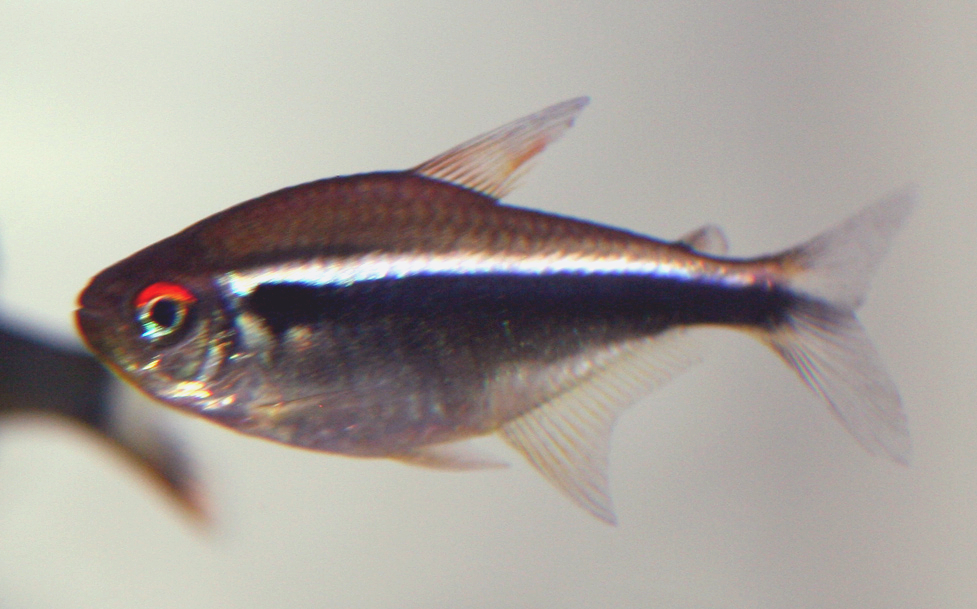
Black neon tetra, Hyphessobrycon herbertaxelrodi

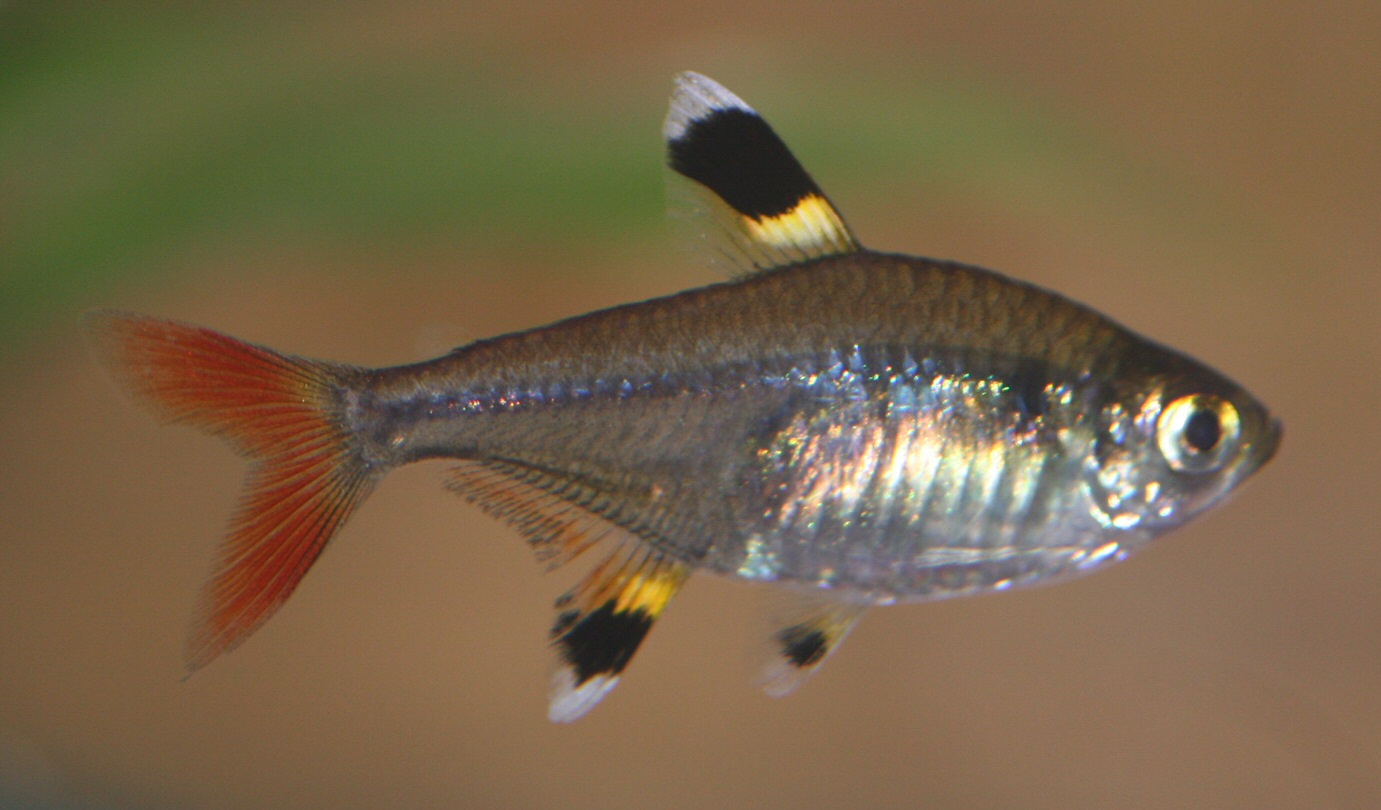
Pristella tetra, Pristella maxillaris

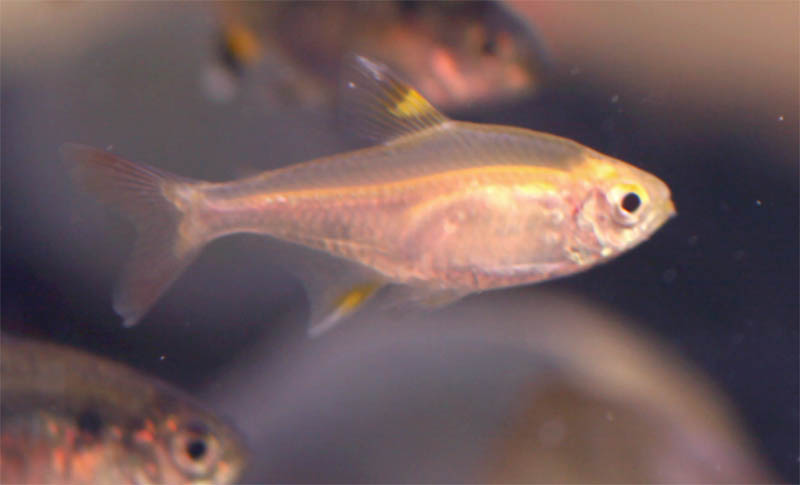
Golden pristella tetra, a morph of Pristella maxillaris

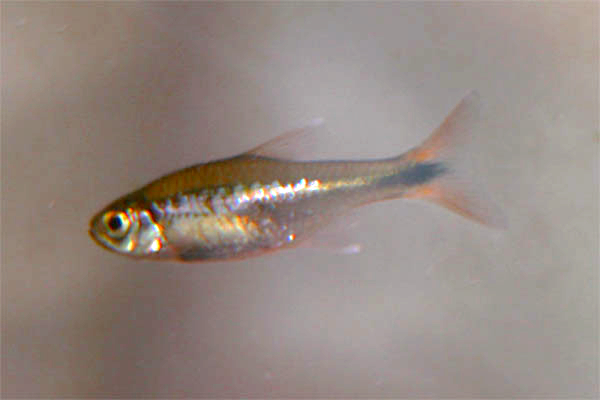
Silvertip tetra, Hasemania nana

Tetra is the common name of many small freshwater characiform fishes. Tetras come from Africa, Central America, and South America, belonging to the biological families Characidae, Alestidae (the "African tetras"), Lepidarchidae, Lebiasinidae, Acestrorhynchidae, Stevardiidae, and Acestrorhamphidae. In the past, all of these families were placed in the Characidae. The Characidae and their allies are distinguished from other fish by the presence of a small adipose fin between the dorsal and caudal fins. Many of these, such as the neon tetra (Paracheirodon innesi), are brightly colored and easy to keep in captivity. Consequently, they are extremely popular for home aquaria.

Tetra is no longer a taxonomic, phylogenetic term. It is short for Tetragonopterus, a genus name formerly applied to many of these fish, which is Greek for "square-finned" (literally, four-sided-wing).

Because of the popularity of tetras in the fishkeeping hobby, many unrelated fish are commonly known as tetras, including species from different families. Even vastly different fish may be called tetras. For example, payara (Hydrolycus scomberoides) is occasionally known as the "sabretooth tetra" or "vampire tetra".

Tetras generally have compressed (sometimes deep), fusiform bodies and are typically identifiable by their fins. They ordinarily possess a homocercal caudal fin (a twin-lobed, or forked, tail fin whose upper and lower lobes are of equal size) and a tall dorsal fin characterized by a short connection to the fish's body. Additionally, tetras possess a long anal fin stretching from a position just posterior of the dorsal fin and ending on the ventral caudal peduncle, and a small, fleshy adipose fin located dorsally between the dorsal and caudal fins. This adipose fin represents the fourth unpaired fin on the fish (the four unpaired fins are the caudal fin, dorsal fin, anal fin, and adipose fin), lending to tetra, which is Greek for four. While this adipose fin is generally considered the distinguishing feature, some tetras (such as the emperor tetras, Nematobrycon palmeri) lack this appendage. Ichthyologists debate the function of the adipose fin, doubting its role in swimming due to its small size and lack of stiffening rays or spines.

Although the list below is sorted by common name, in a number of cases, the common name is applied to different species. Since the aquarium trade may use a different name for the same species, advanced aquarists tend to use scientific names for the less-common tetras. The list below is incomplete.

== Species ==
Tetra species: A–D

- Adonis tetra, Lepidarchus adonis
- African long-finned tetra, Brycinus longipinnis
- African moon tetra, Bathyaethiops caudomaculatus
- Arnold's tetra, Arnoldichthys spilopterus
- Banded tetra, Psalidodon fasciatus
- Bandtail tetra, Moenkhausia dichroura
- Barred glass tetra, Phenagoniates macrolepis
- Beacon tetra, Hemigrammus ocellifer
- Belgian flag tetra, Hyphessobrycon heterorhabdus
- Black morpho tetra, Poecilocharax weitzmani
- Black neon tetra, Hyphessobrycon herbertaxelrodi
- Black phantom tetra, Hyphessobrycon megalopterus
- Black tetra or butterfly tetra, Gymnocorymbus ternetzi
- Black tetra, Gymnocorymbus thayer
- Black wedge tetra, Hemigrammus pulcher
- Blackband tetra, Hyphessobrycon scholzei
- Blackedge tetra, Tyttocharax madeirae
- Black-flag tetra, Hyphessobrycon rosaceus
- Black-jacket tetra, Moenkhausia takasei
- blackline tetra, Hyphessobrycon scholzei
- Bleeding heart tetra, Hyphessobrycon erythrostigma
- Blind tetra, Stygichthys typhlops
- Blood Red tetra, Brittanichthys axelrodi
- Bloodfin tetra, Aphyocharax anisitsi
- Blueberry tetra, Hyphessobrycon wadai
- blue tetra, Boehlkea fredcochui
- blue tetra, Mimagoniates microlepis
- blue tetra, Tyttocharax madeirae
- Bucktooth tetra, Exodon paradoxus
- Buenos Aires tetra, Psalidodon anisitsi
- Callistus tetra, Hyphessobrycon eques
- calypso tetra, Hyphessobrycon axelrodi
- Candy cane tetra, Hyphessobrycon sp. HY511
- Cardinal tetra, Paracheirodon axelrodi
- Carlana tetra, Carlana eigenmanni
- Cochu's blue tetra, Knodus borki
- Colombian tetra, Hyphessobrycon columbianus
- Central tetra, Astyanax aeneus
- Coffee-bean tetra, Hyphessobrycon takasei
- Colcibolca tetra, Astyanax nasutus
- Congo tetra, Phenacogrammus interruptus
- Copper tetra, Hasemania melanura
- Costello tetra, Hemigrammus hyanuary
- Creek tetra, Bryconamericus scleroparius
- Creek tetra, Bryconamericus terrabensis
- Croaking tetra, Mimagoniates inequalis
- Croaking tetra, Mimagoniates lateralis
- Croaking tetra, Mimagoniates microlepis
- Dawn tetra, Aphyocharax paraguayensis
- Dawn tetra, Hyphessobrycon eos
- Diamond tetra, Moenkhausia pittieri
- Discus tetra, Brachychalcinus orbicularis
- Disk tetra, Myleus schomburgkii
- Dragonfin tetra, Pseudocorynopoma doriae

E–Q

- Ember tetra, Hyphessobrycon amandae
- Emperor tetra, Nematobrycon palmeri
- False black tetra, Gymnocorymbus thayeri
- False rummynose tetra, Petitella georgiae
- Featherfin tetra, Hemigrammus unilineatus
- Firehead tetra, Petitella bleheri
- Flag tetra, Hyphessobrycon heterorhabdus
- Flame tail tetra, Aphyocharax erythrurus
- Flame tetra, Hyphessobrycon flammeus
- Garnet tetra, Hemigrammus pulcher
- Glass tetra, Moenkhausia oligolepis
- Glass bloodfin tetra, Prionobrama filigera
- Glossy tetra, Moenkhausia oligolepis
- Glowlight tetra, Hemigrammus erythrozonus
- Gold tetra (aka golden tetra, or brass tetra), Hemigrammus rodwayi
- Goldencrown tetra, Aphyocharax alburnus
- Goldspotted tetra, Hyphessobrycon griemi
- Gold-tailed tetra, Carlastyanax aurocaudatus
- Green dwarf tetra, Odontocharacidium aphanes
- Green neon tetra, Paracheirodon simulans
- Griem's tetra, Hyphessobrycon griemi
- Head & Taillight tetra, Hemigrammus ocellifer
- Hummingbird tetra Trochilocharax ornatus
- January tetra, Hemigrammus hyanuary
- Jellybean tetra, Lepidarchus adonis
- Jewel tetra, Hyphessobrycon eques
- Jumping tetra, Hemibrycon tridens
- Largespot tetra, Astyanax orthodus
- Lemon tetra, Hyphessobrycon pulchripinnis
- Longfin tetra, Brycinus longipinnis
- Long-finned glass tetra, Xenagoniates bondi
- Longjaw tetra, Bramocharax bransfordii
- Loreto tetra, Hyphessobrycon loretoensis
- Mayan tetra, Hyphessobrycon compressus
- Mexican tetra, Astyanax mexicanus
- Mimic scale-eating tetra, Deuterodon heterostomus
- Mourning tetra, Brycon pesu
- Naked tetra, Gymnocharacinus bergii
- Neon tetra, Paracheirodon innesi
- Niger tetra, Arnoldichthys spilopterus
- Nurse tetra, Brycinus nurse
- Oneline tetra, Nannaethiops unitaeniatus
- One-line tetra, Hemigrammus unilineatus
- Orangefin tetra, Bryconops affinis
- Ornate tetra, Hyphessobrycon bentosi
- Panama tetra, Hyphessobrycon panamensis
- Penguin tetra, Thayeria boehlkei
- Peruvian tetra, Hyphessobrycon peruvianus
- Petticoat tetra, Gymnocorymbus ternetzi
- Phantom tetra, Hyphessobrycon megalopterus
- Pittier's tetra, Moenkhausia pittieri
- Pretty tetra, Hemigrammus pulcher
- Pristella tetra, Pristella maxillaris
- Pygmy tetra, Odontostilbe dialeptura

R–Z

- rainbow tetra, Nematobrycon lacortei
- rainbow tetra, Nematobrycon palmeri
- Red eye tetra, Moenkhausia sanctaefilomenae
- Red phantom tetra, Hyphessobrycon sweglesi
- Red tetra or rio tetra, Hyphessobrycon flammeus
- Redspotted tetra, Copeina guttata
- Rosy tetra, Hyphessobrycon rosaceus
- Royal tetra, Inpaichthys kerri
- Ruby tetra, Axelrodia riesei
- Rummy-nose tetra, Petitella rhodostoma
- brilliant rummy-nose tetra, Petitella bleheri
- Sailfin tetra, Crenuchus spilurus
- Savage tetra, Hyphessobrycon savagei
- Savanna tetra, Hyphessobrycon stegemanni
- Semaphore tetra, Pterobrycon myrnae
- Serpae tetra, Hyphessobrycon eques
- Sharptooth tetra, Micralestes acutidens
- Silver tetra, Ctenobrycon spilurus
- Silver tetra, Gymnocorymbus thayeri
- Silver tetra, Micralestes acutidens
- Silvertip tetra, Hasemania melanura
- Silvertip tetra, Hasemania nana
- Splash tetra, Copella arnoldi
- Spot-fin tetra, Hyphessobrycon socolofi
- Spottail tetra, Moenkhausia dichroura
- Spotted tetra, Copella nattereri
- Swegles's tetra, Hyphessobrycon sweglesi
- Tailspot tetra, Bryconops caudomaculatus
- Three-lined African tetra, Neolebias trilineatus
- Tietê tetra, Brycon insignis
- Tortuguero tetra, Hyphessobrycon tortuguerae
- transparent tetra, Charax gibbosus
- True big-scale tetra, Brycinus macrolepidotus
- Uruguay tetra, Cheirodon interruptus
- White spot tetra, Aphyocharax paraguayensis
- x-ray tetra, Pristella maxillaris
- Yellow tetra, Hyphessobrycon bifasciatus
- Yellow-tailed African tetra, Alestopetersius caudalis
