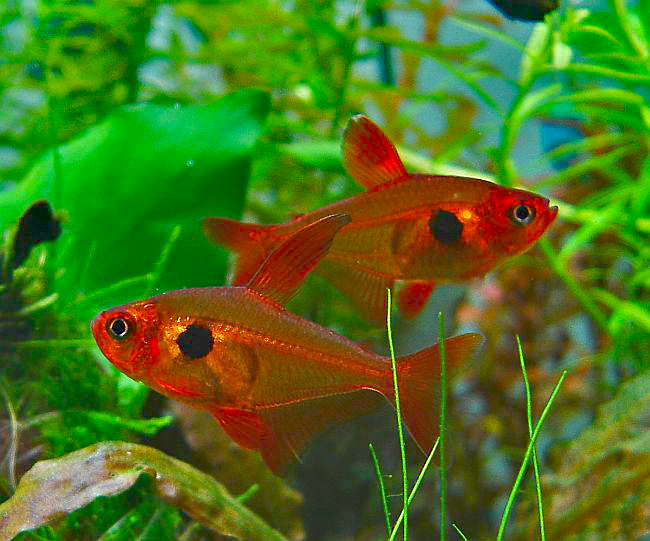
- Red phantom tetra (M. sweglesi)

Scientific classification
- Kingdom: Animalia
- Phylum: Chordata
- Class: Actinopterygii
- Order: Characiformes
- Family: Acestrorhamphidae
- Subfamily: Megalamphodinae
- Genus: Megalamphodus; C. H. Eigenmann, 1915

Type species
- Megalamphodus megalopterus C. H. Eigenmann, 1915

Species
- See text

= Megalamphodus =

Genus of fishes

Megalamphodus is a genus of freshwater ray-finned fishes belonging to the family Acestrorhamphidae, the American tetras. The fishes in this genus are found in the Neotropics. Many prominent ornamental tetras belong to this genus.

Although recognized as a distinct genus early on, it was later synonymized with Hyphessobrycon. More recent studies have resurrected this genus, and have found that it belongs to a different subfamily of the Acestrorhamphidae than Hyphessobrycon.

== Taxonomy ==
Megalamphodus contains the following valid species:

- Megalamphodus bentosi (Durbin, 1908) (Ornate tetra)
- Megalamphodus copelandi (Durbin, 1908) (Black heart tetra)
- Megalamphodus epicharis (S. H. Weitzman & L. F. Palmer, 1997) (Crystalline rosy tetra)
- Megalamphodus eques (Steindachner, 1882) (Jewel tetra)
- Megalamphodus erythrostigma (Fowler, 1943) (Bleeding-heart tetra)
- Megalamphodus haraldschultzi (Travassos, 1960) (Crystal red tetra)
- Megalamphodus khardinae (Zarske, 2008)
- Megalamphodus megalopterus C. H. Eigenmann, 1915 (Black-phantom tetra)
- Megalamphodus micropterus C. H. Eigenmann, 1915
- Megalamphodus rosaceus (Durbin, 1909) (Rosy tetra)
- Megalamphodus socolofi (S. H. Weitzman, 1977) (Spot-fin tetra)
- Megalamphodus sweglesi Géry, 1961 (Red-phantom tetra)
