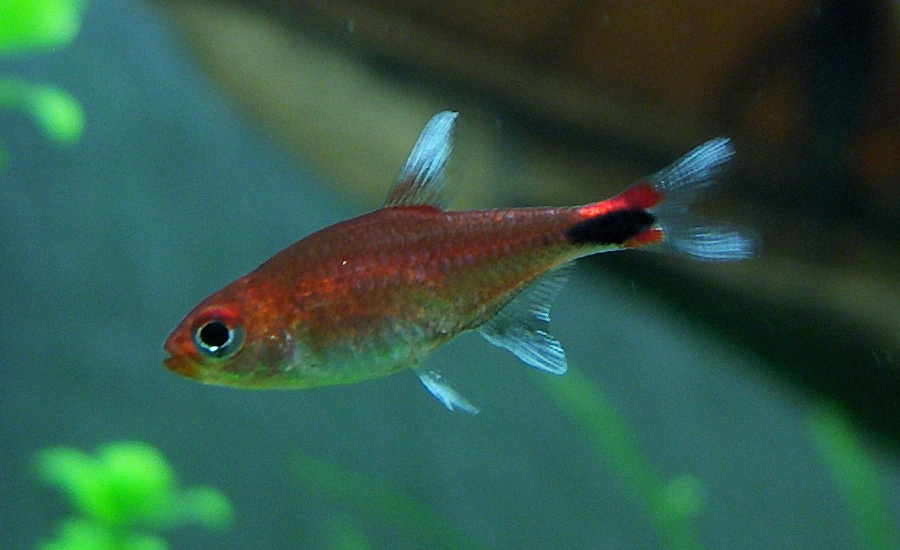

Conservation status
- Least Concern (IUCN 3.1)

Scientific classification
- Kingdom: Animalia
- Phylum: Chordata
- Class: Actinopterygii
- Order: Characiformes
- Family: Acestrorhamphidae
- Subfamily: Megalamphodinae
- Genus: Axelrodia
- Species: A. riesei

Binomial name
- Axelrodia riesei Géry, 1965

= Ruby tetra =

Species of fish

The ruby tetra (Axelrodia riesei) is a species of freshwater ray-finned fish belonging to the family Acestrorhamphidae, the American tetras. This fish is found in northern South America.

== Taxonomy ==
The ruby tetra was first formally described in 1965 by the French ichthyologist Jacques Géry, with its type locality given as the Upper Río Meta basin, east of Villavicencio in Colombia. Axelrodia was first proposed as a monospecific genus in 1965 by Géry, with its only species being Axelrodia fowleri, and this taxon also being designated as the type species by Géry. The genus Axelrodia is classified within the subfamily Megalamphodinae of the family Acestrorhamphidae, the American tetras, in the suborder Characoidei of the order Characiformes.

== Etymology ==
The ruby tetra is classified within the genus Axelrodia, and has the specific name reisei. The genus name honours the aquarist and publisher Herbert R. Axelrod, while the specific name honours William Riese, an exporter of tropical fish; these were the two people who collected the holotype of this species.

== Description ==
The ruby tetra is a small fish with a maximum standard length of 2.5 cm (0.98 in). The dominant colour of this species is ruby red, but this fades in captivity. This species can be told apart from A. stigmatias by having 14 or 15 rays in the anal fin, having between 7 and 10 premaxillary teeth and 4 or 5 maxillary teeth, and its standard length being over 3 times the depth of the body.

== Distribution and habitat ==
The ruby tetra is found in northern South America in the upper Orinoco basin of Colombia and Venezuela. It may also occur in the upper Rio Negro in Brazil, but this requires confirmation. This species prefers small tributaries.

== Utilisation ==
The ruby tetra is a popular fish with aquarists and is traded in the aquarium trade.
