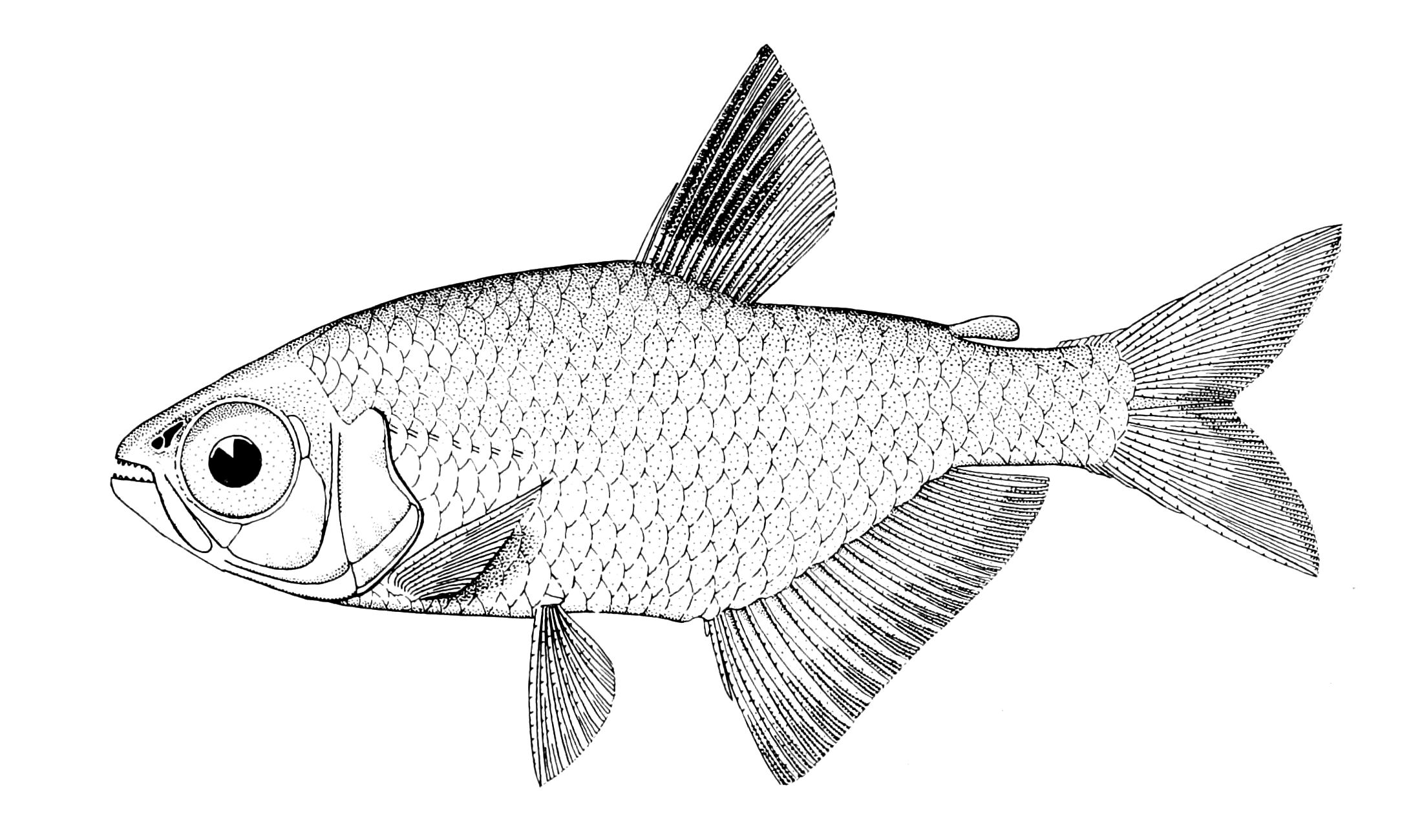

Conservation status
- Least Concern (IUCN 3.1)

Scientific classification
- Kingdom: Animalia
- Phylum: Chordata
- Class: Actinopterygii
- Order: Characiformes
- Family: Acestrorhamphidae
- Subfamily: Megalamphodinae
- Genus: Megalamphodus
- Species: M. micropterus

Binomial name
- Megalamphodus micropterus C. H. Eigenmann, 1915

Synonyms
- Hyphessobrycon micropterus (C. H. Eigenmann, 1915)

= Megalamphodus micropterus =

Species of fish

Megalamphodus micropterus is a species of freshwater ray-finned fish belonging to the family Acestrorhamphidae, the American characins. This fish is endemic to Brazil.

== Taxonomy ==
Megalamphodus micropterus was first formally described in 1915 by the German-born American ichthyologist Carl H. Eigenmann, with its type locality given as the Rio São Francisco at Lagoa do Porto in Brazil. In 2024, this species was reclassified in the genus Megalamphodus which had been proposed by Carl H. Eigenmann in 1915, and is the type genus of the subfamily Megalamphodinae, the red tetras, within the American tetra family, Acestrorhamphidae. This family is classified within the suborder Characoidei of the order Characiformes.

== Etymology ==
Megalamphodus micropterus is classified in the genus Megalamphodus, which is Greek and means "with spacious ways", a name coined by Carl H. Eigenmann which he gave no explanation for. It may be an allusion to the "very large" fontanels, the frontal bones being described as "entirely separate", that is, with a space between them and the parietal bones. The specific name, micropterus, means "small-finned", a reference to the small fins of this species compared to Megalamphodus megalopterus.

== Description ==
Megalamphodus micropterus has a maximum standard length of 2.7 cm (1.1 in).

== Distribution and habitat ==
Megalamphodus micropterus is endemic to Brazil, where it occurs only in the rivers and streams of the São Francisco River basin in the states of Bahia and Minas Gerais. This species is a benthopelagic fish which feeds on zooplankton in lentic environments such as lagoons.
