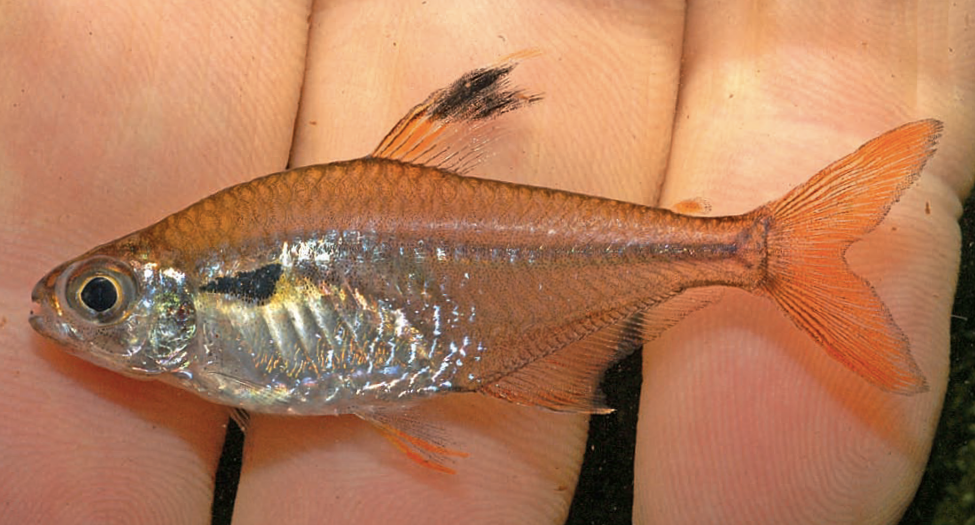

Conservation status
- Least Concern (IUCN 3.1)

Scientific classification
- Kingdom: Animalia
- Phylum: Chordata
- Class: Actinopterygii
- Order: Characiformes
- Family: Acestrorhamphidae
- Subfamily: Megalamphodinae
- Genus: Megalamphodus
- Species: M. khardinae

Binomial name
- Megalamphodus khardinae (Zarske, 2008)

Synonyms
- Hyphessobrycon khardinae Zarske, 2008

= Megalamphodus khardinae =

Species of fish

Megalamphodus khardinae is a species of freshwater ray-finned fish belonging to the family Acestrorhamphidae, the American characins. This species is endemic to Brazil.

== Taxonomy ==
Megalamphodus khardinae was first formally described as Hyphessobrycon khardinae in 2008 by the German ichthyologist Axel Zarske, with its type locality given as "Surroundings of Lago Cassianá, Tapaua, rio Itaparanga, Amazonas, Brazil". In 2024, this species was reclassified in the genus Megalamphodus which had been proposed by Carl H. Eigenmann in 1915, and is the type genus of the subfamily Megalamphodinae, the red tetras, within the American tetra family, Acestrorhamphidae. This family is classified within the suborder Characoidei of the order Characiformes.

== Etymology ==
Megalamphodus khardinae is classified in the genus Megalamphodus, which is Greek and means "with spacious ways", a name coined by Carl H. Eigenmann which he gave no explanation for. It may be an allusion to the "very large" fontanels, the frontal bones being described as "entirely separate", that is, with a space between them and the parietal bones. The specific name honours Natasha Khardina, an Uzbek photographer. Khardina and her husband, the late German explorer and fish trader Heiko Bleher, collected the holotype.

== Description ==
Megalamphodus khardinae has a maximum standard length of 3.9 cm (1.5 in). This species is distinguished from other related tetras by having between 2 and 6 teeth, each with between 3 and 5 cusps in the external teeth row. The premaxilla has a single row of teeth which are wide and have 5 cusps. There are between 31 and 34 scales on the longitudinal rows. It has a comparatively deep body which fits between 2.62 and 2.93 in its standard length. There is a longitudinally elongated humeral spot with one of its points directed headwards. The background colour is orange to pale brown, although the body is rather tranluscent, especially on its upper half. A dark reticulated pattern in the upper body is created by brown pigment on the scale edges. The underside is silvery. The humeral spot is black andresembles an actute right-angled triangle with the acute angle directed towards the head. The humeral spot is partially surrounded by an iridescent, yellowish patch.

== Distribution and habitat ==
Megalamphodus khardinae is found in South America, where it is known only from Tapauá, Itaporanga River, the lower Purus River basin, and other locations in the Purus River basin in Amazonas. The habitat it was found in was a blackwater with a very slow, almost imperceptible current with a sand or mud substrate and almost no aquatic vegetation.
