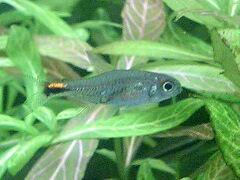
- Firefly tetra (Axelrodia species)

Scientific classification
- Kingdom: Animalia
- Phylum: Chordata
- Class: Actinopterygii
- Order: Characiformes
- Family: Acestrorhamphidae
- Subfamily: Megalamphodinae
- Genus: Axelrodia; Géry, 1965

Type species
- Axelrodia fowleri Géry, 1965

= Axelrodia =

Genus of fishes

Axelrodia is a genus of freshwater ray-finned fishes belonging to the family Acestrorhamphidae, the American tetras. The fishes in this genus are found in the Amazon Basin and Meta River in South America.

== Species ==
Axelrodia contains the following valid species:

- Axelrodia riesei Géry, 1966 (ruby tetra)
- Axelrodia stigmatias (Fowler, 1913)

Axelrodia lindeae Géry, 1973 is recognized by the World Register of Marine Species, but not Eschmeyer's Catalog of Fishes.

== Etymology ==
Axelrodia was named in honour of Herbert R. Axelrod, publisher of Tropical Fish Hobbyist magazine.
