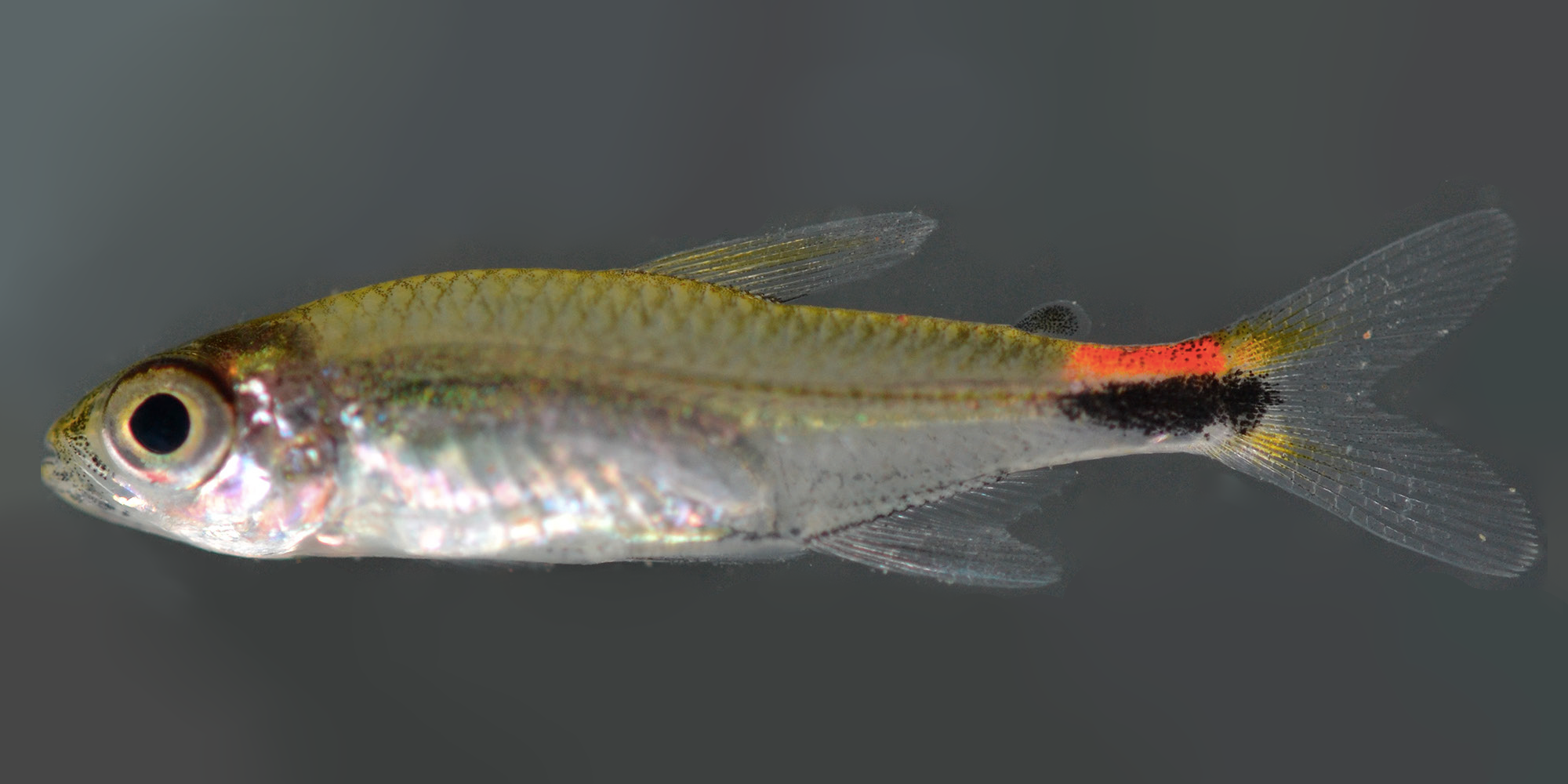

Conservation status
- Least Concern (IUCN 3.1)

Scientific classification
- Kingdom: Animalia
- Phylum: Chordata
- Class: Actinopterygii
- Division: Teleostei
- Order: Characiformes
- Family: Acestrorhamphidae
- Subfamily: Megalamphodinae
- Genus: Axelrodia
- Species: A. stigmatias

Binomial name
- Axelrodia stigmatias Fowler, 1913

Synonyms
- Hyphessobrycon stigmatias Fowler, 1913; Axelrodia fowleri Géry, 1965

= Axelrodia stigmatias =

Species of fish

Axelrodia stigmatias is a species of freshwater ray-finned fish belonging to the family Acestrorhamphidae, the American tetras. This fish is found in northern South America.

== Taxonomy ==
Axelrdodia stigmatias was first formally described as Hyphessobrycon stigmatias in 1913 by the American zoologist Henry Weed Fowler, with its type locality given as a tributary of the Rio Madeira near Porto Velho in Brazil. In 1965, Jacques Géry described the new species Axelrodia fowleri from near Iquitos in Peru, classifying it in a new monospecific genus, Axelrodia, also designating it as the type species. A. fowleri is now considered to be a synonym of H. stigmatias. The genus Axelrodia is classified within the subfamily Megalamphodinae of the family Acestrorhamphidae, the American tetras, in the suborder Characoidei of the order Characiformes.

== Etymology ==
Axelrdodia stigmatias is the type species of the genus Axelrodia. This name honours the aquarist and publisher Herbert R. Axelrod. The specific name, stigmatias, is Latin and means "the bearer of a brand", an allusion to the obvious oval spot on the caudal peduncle.

== Description ==
Axelrdodia stigmatias is a small fish with a maximum standard length of 2.5 cm (0.98 in). This species has a silvery overall colour with an obvious, large oval black spot at the lower part of the caudal peduncle and a smaller iridescent spot on the upper caudal peduncle. This species has 14 or 15 soft rays in the anal fin, between 7 and 10 premaxillary teeth, and 4 or 5 maxillary teeth. Its standard length is over 4.5 times the depth of the body. It also has a large, "almost complete" suborbital bone.

== Distribution and habitat ==
Axelrdodia stigmatias has a wide range across the western part of the Amazon Basin in Brazil, Colombia, Ecuador and Peru. It is typically found in medium to large streams within forested regions.

== Utilisation ==
Axelrdodia stigmatias is an important component of the aquarium trade, where it is often sold under the names white star tetra or pepper tetra.
