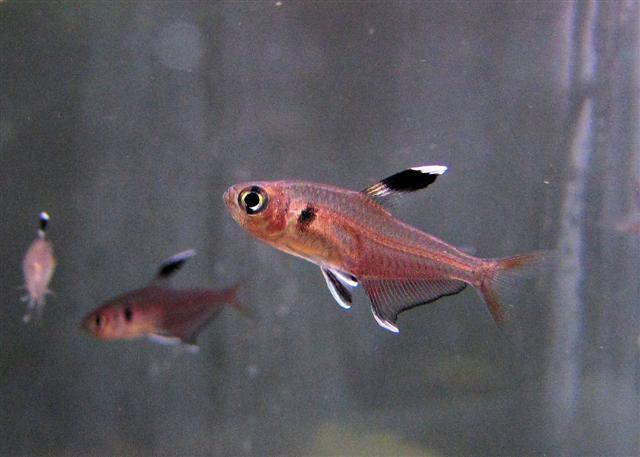

Conservation status
- Least Concern (IUCN 3.1)

Scientific classification
- Kingdom: Animalia
- Phylum: Chordata
- Class: Actinopterygii
- Order: Characiformes
- Family: Acestrorhamphidae
- Subfamily: Megalamphodinae
- Genus: Megalamphodus
- Species: M. copelandi

Binomial name
- Megalamphodus copelandi (Durbin, 1908)

Synonyms
- Hyphessobrycon copelandi Durbin, 1908

= Megalamphodus copelandi =

Species of fish

Megalamphodus copelandi, the black heart tetra, feather tetra or Copeland's tetra, is a species of freshwater ray-finned fish belonging to the family Acestrorhamphidae, the American tetras. This species is found in South America.

== Taxonomy ==
Megalamphodus copelandi was first formally described as Hyphessobrycon copelandi in 1908 by the American entomologist and ichthyologist Marion Durbin Ellis, with its type locality given as Tabatinga in Amazonas, Brazil. In 2024, this species was reclassified in the genus Megalamphodus, which had been proposed by Carl H. Eigenmann in 1915, and is the type genus of the subfamily Megalamphodinae, the red tetras, within the American tetra family, Acestrorhamphidae. This family is classified within the suborder Characoidei of the order Characiformes.

== Etymology ==
Megalamphodus copelandi is classified in the genus Megalamphodus, which is Greek and means "with spacious ways", a name coined by Carl H. Eigenmann which he gave no explanation for. It may be an allusion to the "very large" fontanels, the frontal bones being described as "entirely separate", that is, with a space between them and the parietal bones. The specific name honours Herbert Copeland, a Boston volunteer on the 1865–1866 Thayer Expedition to Brazil, during which the type specimen was collected.

== Description ==
Megalamphodus copelandi has a fusiform body with a maximum total length of 5 cm (2.0 in). The overall colour of this fish is grey with a black spot behind the opercle. The dorsal fin is black and white, and the pelvic and anal fins have white margins. Mature males develop more elongated dorsal and anal fins than females.

== Distribution and habitat ==
Megalamphodus copelandi is found in South America in the Amazon and Orinoco river systems in Bolivia, Brazil, Colombia, Ecuador, Peru and Venezuela. It is also found in drainages in Suriname and French Guiana. It occurs in slow flowing tributaries and lakes on floodplains.

== Utilisation ==
Megalamphodus copelandi is an uncommon species in the aquarium trade.
