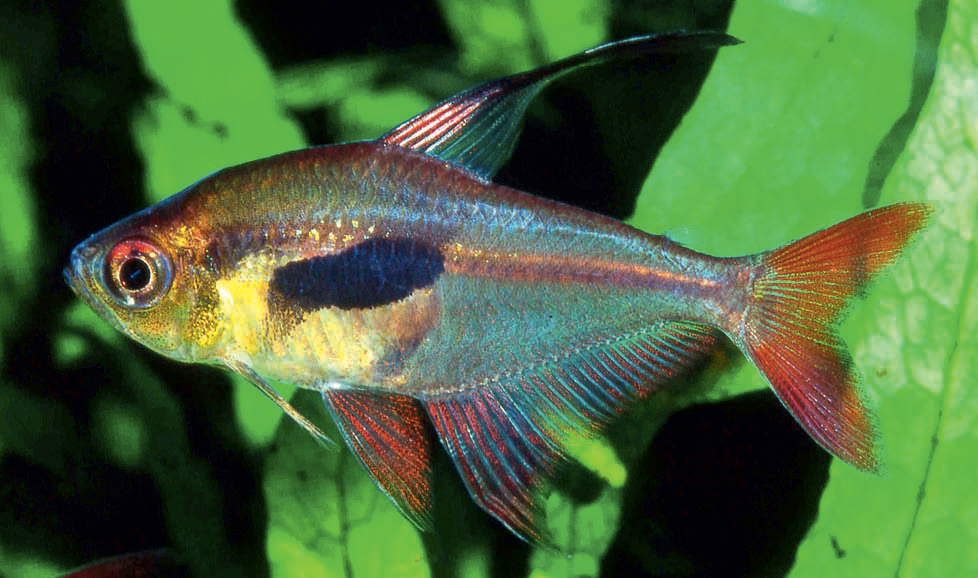

Conservation status
- Least Concern (IUCN 3.1)

Scientific classification
- Kingdom: Animalia
- Phylum: Chordata
- Class: Actinopterygii
- Order: Characiformes
- Family: Acestrorhamphidae
- Subfamily: Megalamphodinae
- Genus: Megalamphodus
- Species: M. epicharis

Binomial name
- Megalamphodus epicharis (Weitzman & Palmer, 1997)

Synonyms
- Hyphessobrycon epicharis Weitzman & Palmer, 1997

= Megalamphodus epicharis =

Species of fish

Megalamphodus epicharis, the crystalline rosy tetra, is a species of freshwater ray-finned fish in the American tetra family Acestrorhamphidae. This species is only known to occur in the upper basin of the Rio Negro in Brazil, Colombia and Venezuela, in blackwater tributaries.

== Etymology ==
The generic name Megalamphodus is taken from Greek and means "with spacious ways". Carl H. Eigenmann, who erected the genus in 1915, did not explain the allusion, and it is surmised that this name refers to the "very large" fontanels, where the frontal fontanel is "entirely separate" from the posterior one (i.e. there is a space between the frontal bones and the parietal bones). The specific name, epicharis, means "pleasing", "agreeable" or "charming", a reference to the aesthetically pleasing color and form of this fish.

== Taxonomy ==
Megalamphodus epicharis was first formally described as Hyphessobrycon epicharis in 1997 by the American ichthyologists Stanley Howard Weitzman and Lisa F. Palmer, with its type locality given as the headwaters of the Río Baria, around 3 km (1.9 mi) downstream of the Neblina base camp in the Amazonas State of Venezuela. The exact coordinates are 0°55'N, 66°10'W, and the elevation of the type locality is 120 m (390 ft). In 2024, this species, along with many others, was moved from Hyphessobrycon to the resurrected genus Megalamphodus (which was previously deemed to be a synonym of the former).

== Description ==
Megalamphodus epicharis has a fusiform body, and the maximum standard length of 3.5 cm (1.4 in). The body is transparent but tinted with red in some places. There is a black humeral spot, the caudal fin is reddish orange, and the dorsal fin is black and white, and there are 8 or 9 soft rays in the dorsal fin and between 23 and 29 soft rays in the anal fin. Males develop longer dorsal and anal fins than females, and they are also slimmer and brighter in color.

== Distribution and habitat ==
Megalamphodus epicharis is only known to occur in the upper basin of the Rio Negro in Brazil, Colombia and Venezuela in blackwater tributaries.

== Human interactions ==
Megalamphodus epicharis is collected for the aquarium trade.
