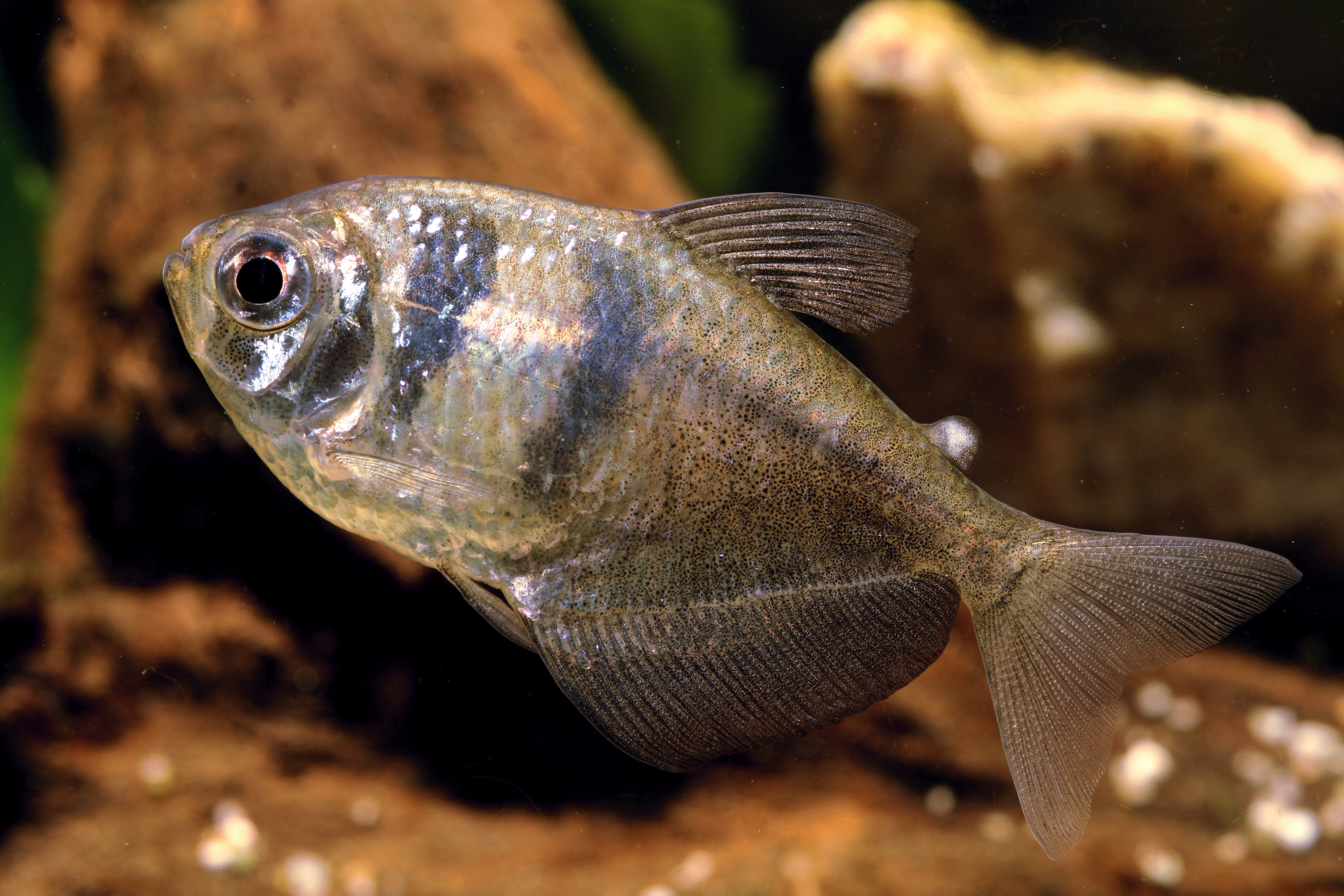
- Gymnocorymbus ternetzi

Scientific classification
- Kingdom: Animalia
- Phylum: Chordata
- Class: Actinopterygii
- Order: Characiformes
- Family: Acestrorhamphidae
- Subfamily: Pristellinae
- Genus: Gymnocorymbus; C. H. Eigenmann, 1908

Type species
- Gymnocorymbus thayeri C. H. Eigenmann, 1908

= Gymnocorymbus =

Genus of fishes

Gymnocorymbus is a genus of freshwater ray-finned fishes belonging to the family Acestrorhamphidae, the American characins. The fishes in this genus are found in the Amazon, Paraguay, Orinoco, Courantyne, Gurupí and Parnaíba river basins in South America. These tetras are popular in the aquarium trade.

== Species ==
Gymnocorymbuscontains the followjng valid species:

- Gymnocorymbus bondi (Fowler, 1911)
- Gymnocorymbus flaviolimai Benine, B. F. de Melo, R. M. C. Castro & C. de Oliveira, 2015
- Gymnocorymbus ternetzi (Boulenger, 1895) (Black tetra)
- Gymnocorymbus thayeri C. H. Eigenmann, 1908 (False black tetra)
