= Megalamphodus haraldschultzi =

Conservation status
- Least Concern (IUCN 3.1)

Scientific classification
- Kingdom: Animalia
- Phylum: Chordata
- Class: Actinopterygii
- Order: Characiformes
- Family: Acestrorhamphidae
- Subfamily: Megalamphodinae
- Genus: Megalamphodus
- Species: M. haraldschultzi

Binomial name
- Megalamphodus haraldschultzi (Travassos, 1960)

Synonyms
- Hyphessobrycon haraldschultzi Travassos, 1960

Species of fish

Megalamphodus haraldschultzi, the crystal red tetra, is a species of freshwater ray-finned fish belonging to the family Acestrorhamphidae, the American characins. This species is found in South America, where it is endemic to Brazil. It occasionally appears in the aquarium trade.

== Taxonomy ==
Megalamphodus haraldschultzi was first formally described in 1960 as Hyphessobrycon haraldschultzi by the Brazilian ichthyologist Haroldo Pereira Travassos, with its type locality given as Ilha do Bananal in Goiaz, Brazil. In 2024, this species was reclassified in the genus Megalamphodus, which had been proposed by Carl H. Eigenmann in 1915, and is the type genus of the subfamily Megalamphodinae, the red tetras, within the American characin family, Acestrorhamphidae. This family is classified within the suborder Characoidei of the order Characiformes.

== Etymology ==
Megalamphodus haraldschultzi is classified in the genus Megalamphodus, which is Greek and means "with spacious ways", a name coined by Carl H. Eigenmann which he gave no explanation for. It may be an allusion to the "very large" fontanels, the frontal bones being described as "entirely separate", that is, with a space between them and the parietal bones. The specific name honours the collector of the holotype, the Brazilian ethnologist and fish collector Harald Schultz.

== Description ==
Megalamphodus haraldschultzi has a maximum total length of 2.1 cm (0.83 in). The colour of the body varies from pinkish-red to reddish brown, with a distinct humeral spot to the rear of the opercle. The dorsal fin has a dark marking with a white blotch above it and a yellow line below it, while the anal and pelvic fins have white margins.

== Distribution and habitat ==
Megalamphodus haraldschultzi is endemic to Brazil, where it is known only from the drainage basin of the Araguaia River in the states of Goiás, Mato Grosso, Pará and Tocantins. This species is thought to inhabit minor tributaries, backwaters and oxbow lakes, rather than main river channels, where the water is soft and weakly acidic, with a layer of fallen leaves and branches cloaking the river bed.

== Utilisation ==
Megalamphodus haraldschultzi infrequently appears in the aquarium trade.
