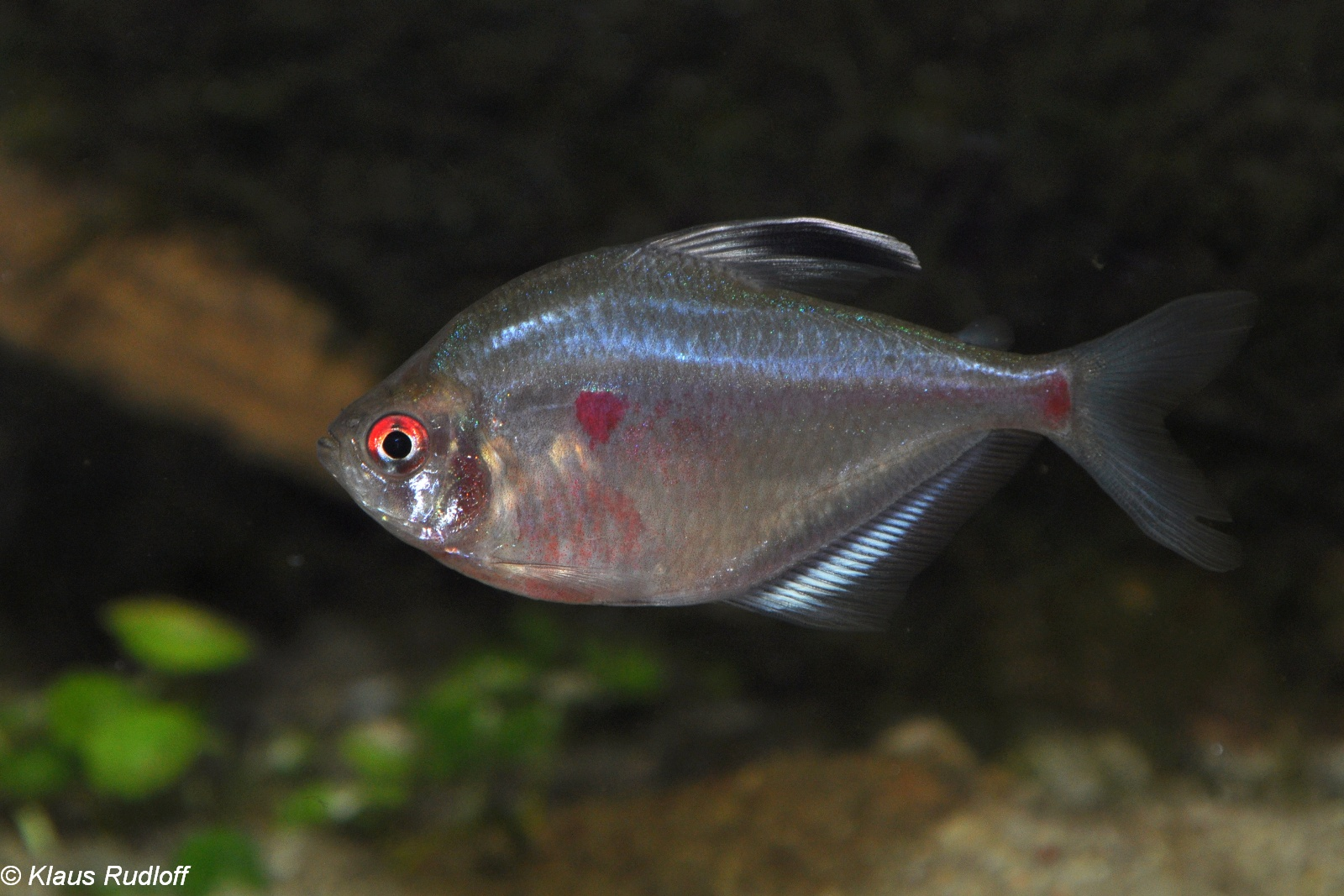

Conservation status
- Least Concern (IUCN 3.1)

Scientific classification
- Kingdom: Animalia
- Phylum: Chordata
- Class: Actinopterygii
- Order: Characiformes
- Family: Acestrorhamphidae
- Subfamily: Megalamphodinae
- Genus: Megalamphodus
- Species: M. socolofi

Binomial name
- Megalamphodus socolofi (Weitzman, 1977)

Synonyms
- Hyphessobrycon socolofi Weitzman, 1977

= Megalamphodus socolofi =

Species of fish

Megalamphodus socolofi, the spotfin tetra, lesser bleeding heart tetra or greenbacked bleeding heart tetra, is a species of freshwater ray-finned fish belonging to the family Acestrorhamphidae, the American characins. This fish is found in northern South America, where it is restricted to the Rio Negro basin of Brazil. The spotfin tetra is found in the aquarium trade.

== Taxonomy ==
Megalamphodus socolofi was first formally described as Hyphessobrycon socolofi in 1977 by the American ichthyologist Stanley Howard Weitzman, with its type locality given as Barcelos, at 0°58'S, 62°57'W on the Rio Negro in Amazonas, Brazil. In 2024, this species was reclassified in the genus Megalamphodus, which had been proposed by Carl H. Eigenmann in 1915 and is the type genus of the subfamily Megalamphodinae, the red tetras, within the American tetra family, Acestrorhamphidae. This family is classified within the suborder Characoidei of the order Characiformes.

== Etymology ==
Megalamphodus socolofi is classified in the genus Megalamphodus, which is Greek and means "with spacious ways", a name coined by Carl H. Eigenmann which he gave no explanation for. It may be an allusion to the “very large” fontanels, the frontal bones being described as "entirely separate", that is, with a space between them and the parietal bones. The specific name honours the American trader and breeder of ornamental fishes Ross Socolof, who used his contacts in Brazil to obtain the holotype of this species.

== Description ==
Megalamphodus socolofi has a deep laterally compressed body with a maximum standard length of 5.6 cm (2.2 in). The overall colour is chocolate brown with a vermilion tint, with pale blue and green tints creating the impression of a violet colour. The lower body is more silvery than the upper. There is a deep red to pink humeral spot with a similrs spot on the caudal peduncle. There is a copper bar to the front of the eye. There is a white stripe along the base of the anal fin, and there is a large black spot covering the third to sixth rays of the dorsal fin.

== Distribution and habitat ==
Megalamphodus socolofi is endemic to Brazil, where it is only known from the basin of the Rio Negro basin in Amazonas state and the Rio Nhamundá, a smaller tributary drainage of the Amazon which has its confluence with the Amazon just downstream of the Rio Negro's confluence. In the Negro system it occurs in a number of tributaries, including the Branco, Padauari and Marauiá. It has been recorded from the states of Amazonas, Pará and Roraima. The spotfin tetra is found in slow flowing tributaries, backwaters and forest lakes, where there are submerged woody structures like roots, fallen branches, and overhanging bankside vegetation or aquatic plants.

== Utilisation ==
Megalamphodus socolofi is found in the aquarium trade, but as the specimens in that trade tend to be wild caught, it is less common than other tetras which may be captive bred.
