= Thayer Expedition =

Research expedition to Brazil (1865–1866)

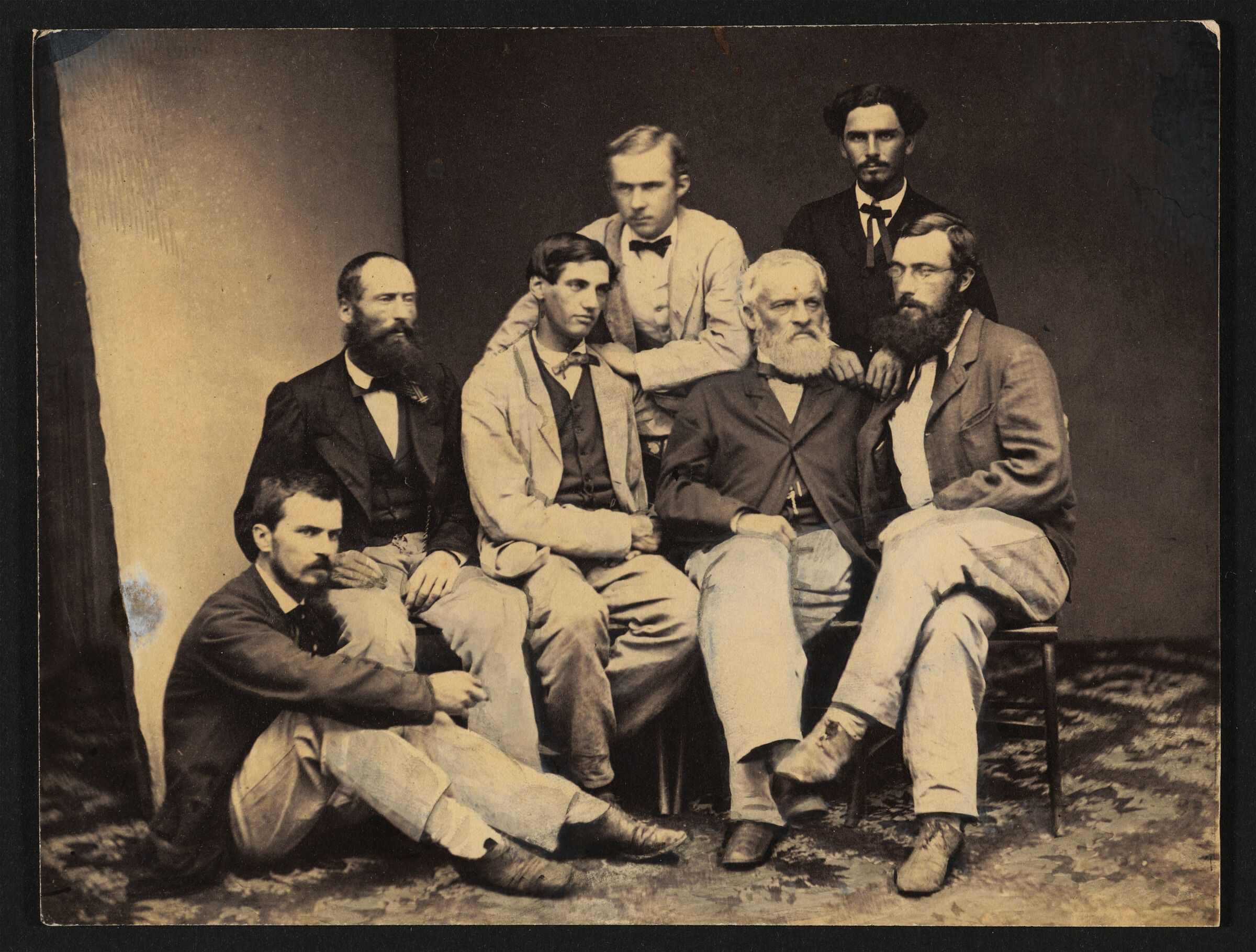
Group portrait of Thayer Expedition assistants and volunteers ca. 1866. Sitting on floor, bottom left: William James. On chairs, left to right: D. Bourget, Walter Hunnewell, Jacques Burkhardt, Newton Dexter. Standing, left to right: Stephen van Rensselaer, João Martins da Silva Coutinho.

The Thayer Expedition was an American scientific expedition to Brazil, sponsored by Boston businessman Nathaniel Thayer Jr. It was a biological and geological expedition undertaken by multiple scientists, several based at Harvard University, between April 1865 and August 1866. Scientists collected tens of thousands of specimens, some later recognized as new species. Most of the specimens collected during the expedition ended up in the collections of Harvard's Museum of Comparative Zoology, founded by Louis Agassiz, the leader of the expedition.

The Thayer Expedition took place at the end of the American Civil War, with the ocean voyage from New York City to Rio de Janeiro beginning on April 2, just a week prior to Lee's surrender at Appomattox. The expedition sailed on board the S.S. Colorado, owned by the Pacific Mail Steamship Company, and docked in Rio de Janeiro on April 23. They explored Brazil from the coast to the Tocantins River and along its tributaries to the borders of Colombia and Peru.

== Participants ==
The expedition included the following named participants:

- Louis Agassiz, Swiss-American zoologist, ichthyologist, geologist, and leader of the expedition. His primary goal for the expedition was the collection of Brazilian freshwater fish specimens.
- Elizabeth Cabot Agassiz, American naturalist, the expedition's main writer and record-keeper, wife of Agassiz.
- Joel Asaph Allen, American curator of ornithology at the Museum of Comparative Zoology.
- John Gould Anthony, American curator of conchology at the Museum of Comparative Zoology.
- Jacques Burkhardt, Swiss scientific illustrator who painted or drew hundreds of fish specimens during the expedition.
- Charles Frederick Hartt, Canadian-American geologist, paleontologist and naturalist who studied Brazilian geology.
- Orestes St. John, American geologist and paleontologist who had been trained by Agassiz.
- George Sceva, American preparator, mainly of fossils, for the Museum of Comparative Zoology and others.
- Six American volunteers: William James (famous future philosopher and psychologist), Herbert Edson Copeland, Newton Dexter, Walter Hunnewell, Stephen Van Rensselaer Thayer (son of expedition sponsor Nathaniel Thayer), and Thomas Ward.
- João Martins da Silva Coutinho, Brazilian army major and attache of the Expedition.
- D. Bourget, French naturalist residing in Rio de Janeiro.

== Species collected (partial list) ==
- Hyphessobrycon bentosi
- Astyanax brevirhinus
- Leporinus agassizii
- Gymnocoryumbus thayeri
- Thayeria obliquua
- Astyanax asymmetricus
- Astyanax symmetricus
- Astyanax zonatus
- Astyanax anterior
- Astyanax bourgeti
- Astyanax bimaculatus borealis
- Astyanax janeiroensis
- Astyanax goyacensis
- Astyanax brevirhimus
- Astyanax giton
- Astyanax albeolus
- Astyanax fasciatus parahybae
- Astyanax scabripinnis intermedius
- Astyanax multidens
- Astyanax gracilior
- Deuterodon pedri
- Deuterodon parahybae
- Pristella
- Psellogrammus
- Hemigrammus coeruleus Durbin
- Hemigrammus levis Durbin
- Hyphessobrycon compressus milleri Durbin
- Hyphessobrycon serpae Durbin
- Hyphessobrycon copelandi Durbin
- Hyphessobrycon panamensis Durbin
- Hyphessobrycon melazonatus Durbin
- Moenkhausia latissimus
- Moenkhausia jamesi
- Moenkhausia comma
- Moenkhausia justae
- Moenkhausia melogrammus
- Moenkhausia australe
- Moenkhausia barbouri
- Moenkhausia dichrourus intermedius
- Moenkhausia llepidurus latus
- Moenkhausia llepidurus içae
- Moenkhausia llepidurus gracilimus
- Moenkhausia cotinho
- Moenkhausia ceros
- Bryconamericus heteresthes
- Bryconamericus stramineus
- Bryconamericus boops
- Bryconamericus breviceps
- Bryconamericus peruanus ricae
- Brycochandus durbini
- Creatochanes gracilis
- Poptella
