= Community aquarium =

Tanks for more than one species of fish

Community aquaria are tanks that are designed to contain more than one species of fish. Most commonly they include a variety of species that do not normally occur together in nature, for example angelfish from Brazil, swordtails from Mexico, and gouramis from South East Asia. The aim of such communities is to bring together fish that are compatible in temperament and water requirements, while using their different colours and behaviors to add interest and entertainment value.

Though not usually called community tanks, most marine aquaria fit into this category too, using fish from places as diverse as the Caribbean, Red Sea, and western Pacific Ocean.

Other aquarists prefer communities, called biotopes, that represent particular geographic locations, and combine fish with appropriate decorative materials including endogenous rocks and plants. The most popular of these geographically correct community tanks are those replicating the cichlid habitat of the East African Rift lakes of Lake Tanganyika and Lake Malawi.

== Community fish ==
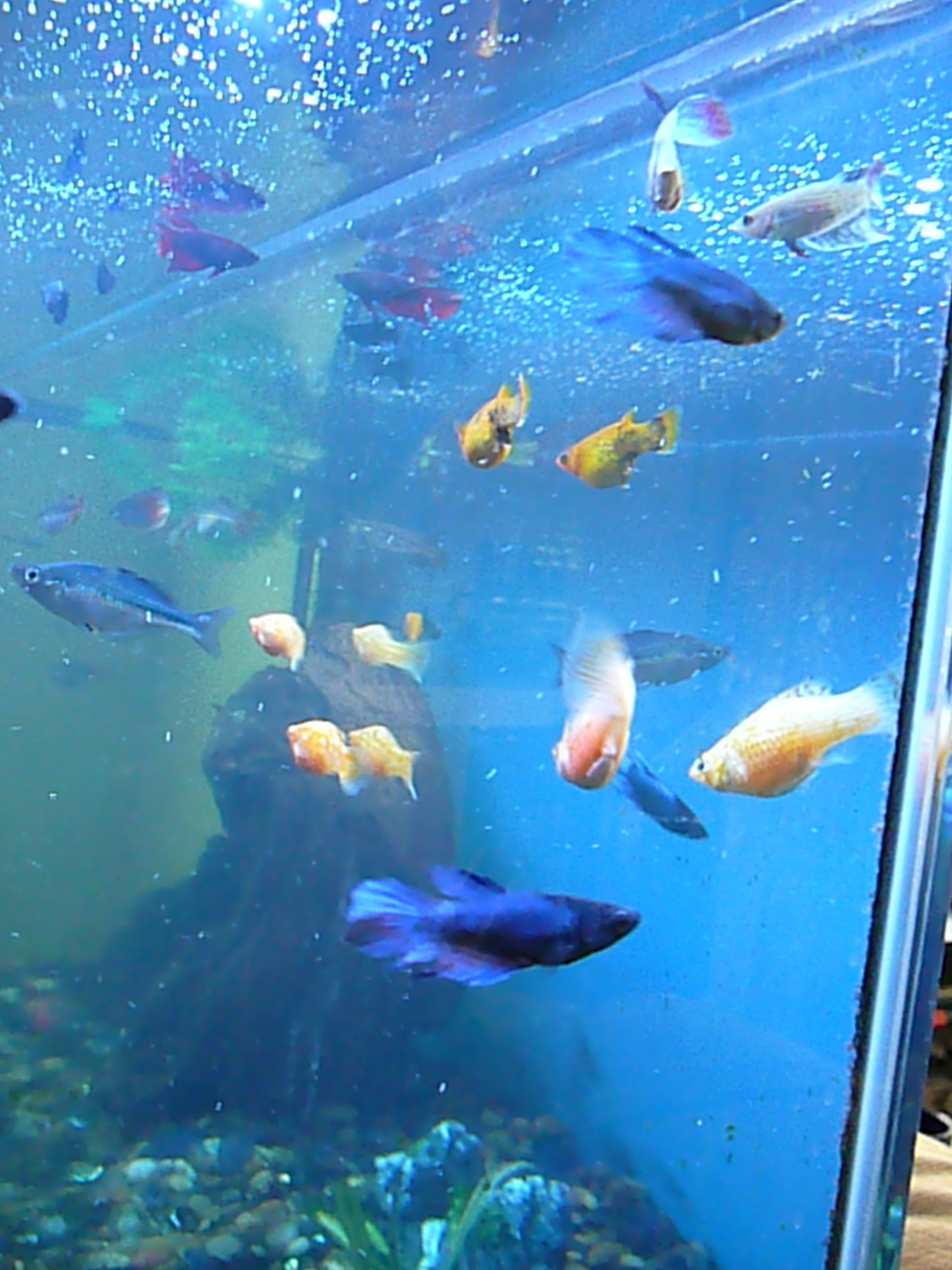
Seen in this community tank are Siamese fighting fish, mollies, a platy, and a rainbowfish.

For freshwater community tanks, there are large numbers of species that make successful community fishes. Most of the livebearers, barbs, tetras, rasboras, danios, and rainbowfishes are peaceful, though a few species are fin nippers, most notably tiger barbs and serpae tetras. Angelfishes, gouramis, and Corydoras catfishes are also popular, though angelfish are predatory and will eat very small fish such as neon tetras and livebearer fry. The size of the fish introduced within a new or established community tank is an essential factor to ensure harmony within the setup. A traditional and proven practice suggest- If a fish fits into the mouth of another fish, there are more chances of it being eaten by the larger variety. Understandably, all fish are opportunistic animals which makes them prone to occasional attacks on the other small-sized members within the tank. Considering the nature of aquatic animals, it is better to pair similar sized fish to maintain stable and peaceful aquarium communities. If neon tetras are kept around fish unlikely to take advantage of their small size, they are very peaceful towards other fish.

Many fishes are not suitable for typical community tanks. These fishes include:

- Territorial or aggressive fishes, such as many cichlids.
- Red-tailed black sharks should not be placed with others of their species, as they often become territorial.
- Predatory fishes such as snakeheads, leaffishes, and bucktooth tetras.
- Large active fishes that will outgrow their tanks and tankmates, such as tinfoil barbs, iridescent sharks, and larger catfishes.
- Fragile fishes, or fishes that get nervous around more active fish, such as the discus and threadfin rainbowfish.
- Slow or specialized eaters that cannot compete with other tankmates, such as pipefishes.

== Water chemistry ==
Most freshwater aquarium fish do well in water that is soft to moderately hard, and that has a pH between 6 and 8.

Brackish water aquaria are a special case and need dedicated community tanks. While a few freshwater and marine fish can adapt to brackish water, most cannot.

The most deadly chemical in aquarium water is ammonia, produced from fish excretions. It is important to test for ammonia, since it is a chemical precursor of nitrites and nitrates, also harmful to fish. Ammonia is removed from the water through the nitrogen cycle, which takes place within the aquarium filter, which takes a few weeks to start processing the ammonia. The processed ammonia is converted to nitrite, which is then processed to nitrate. Weekly water changes (25% of aquarium volume), while vacuuming debris from the bottom of the tank, can solve this problem of nitrate build-up, provided the tank is not overcrowded.

Build-up of algae is largely related to light level and mineral imbalance. An aquarium near a window is likely to be overgrown with algae. A material known as a "phosphate sponge" is available at aquarium shops to leach the phosphate out of the aquarium and reduce the growth of algae. Also, plants such as java moss (not java fern) compete with algae for another necessary plant nutrient, nitrate, and reduce algae growth. Java moss also forms a ground cover along the bottom of the aquarium.
