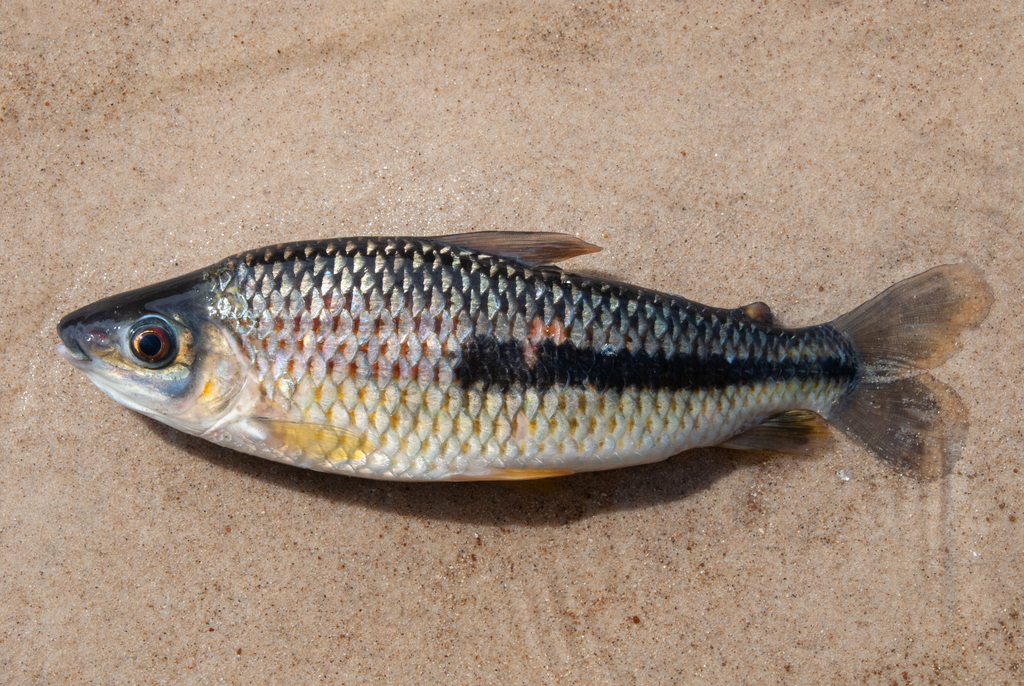

Conservation status
- Least Concern (IUCN 3.1)

Scientific classification
- Kingdom: Animalia
- Phylum: Chordata
- Class: Actinopterygii
- Order: Characiformes
- Family: Anostomidae
- Genus: Leporinus
- Species: L. agassizii

Binomial name
- Leporinus agassizii Steindachner 1876

= Leporinus agassizii =

Species of fish

Leporinus agassizii is a species of freshwater ray-finned fish belonging to the family Anostomidae, the toothed headstanders. It is found in the Amazon River basin in South America.

== Description ==
Leporinus agassizii can reach a standard length of 23.4 centimetres (9.2 in).

== Etymology ==
It is named in honor of zoologist-geologist Louis Agassiz (1807–1873). He was the leading authority on Brazilian fishes at the time, as leader of the Thayer Expedition (1865–1866) to Brazil, which provided Franz Steindachner with many specimens to study.
