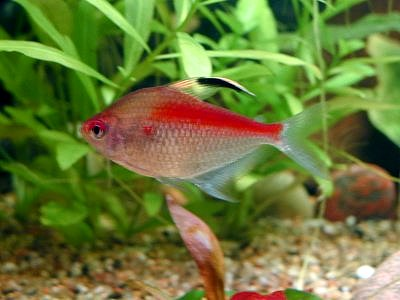
- Male

Conservation status
- Least Concern (IUCN 3.1)

Scientific classification
- Kingdom: Animalia
- Phylum: Chordata
- Class: Actinopterygii
- Order: Characiformes
- Family: Acestrorhamphidae
- Subfamily: Megalamphodinae
- Genus: Megalamphodus
- Species: M. erythrostigma

Binomial name
- Megalamphodus erythrostigma (Fowler, 1943)

Synonyms
- Hemigrammus erythrostigma Fowler, 1943; Hyphessobrycon erythrostigma (Fowler 1943); Hyphessobrycon rubrostigma Hoedeman, 1956

= Bleeding heart tetra =

Species of fish

The bleeding heart tetra (Megalamphodus erythrostigma) is a species of freshwater ray-finned fish belonging to the family Acestrorhamphidae. As many other species of the family, it is native to South America and is popular in the aquarium trade.

== Taxonomy ==
The bleeding heart tetra was first formally described as Hemigrammus erythrostigma in 1943 by the American zoologist Henry Weed Fowler, with its type locality given as "probably" the border area between Brazil and Peru. In 2024, this species was moved to the genus Megalamphodus, which had been proposed by Carl H. Eigenmann in 1915 and is the type genus of the subfamily Megalamphodinae (red tetras) within the family Acestrorhamphidae (American tetras). This family is classified within the suborder Characoidei of the order Characiformes.

== Etymology ==
The bleeding heart tetra is classified in the genus Megalamphodus, which is Greek and means "with spacious ways", a name coined by Carl H. Eigenmann which he gave no explanation for. It may be an allusion to the "very large" fontanels, the frontal bones being described as "entirely separate", that is, with a space between them and the parietal bones. The specific name, erythrostigma, means "red mark" or "red spot", an allusion to the vermilion humeral spot.

== Description ==
The bleeding heart tetra has a maximum standard length of 6.1 cm (2.4 in). The overall colour of the body varies and may be beige, orange or a silvery pale purple. A distinguishing feature is the crimson spot on the flanks. In adults there is a longitudinal white stripe along most of the anal fin. Males develop longer fins than females and tend to be slimmer.

== Distribution and habitat ==
The bleeding heart tetra is found in the western part of the Amazon basin in Brazil, Colombia and Peru. It is found in floodplains and large tributaries, where the water varies from clear to slightly stained.

== Utilisation ==
The bleeding heart tetra is one of the most popular fishes in the aquarium trade, and almost all the fish featuring in that trade are captive-bred.
