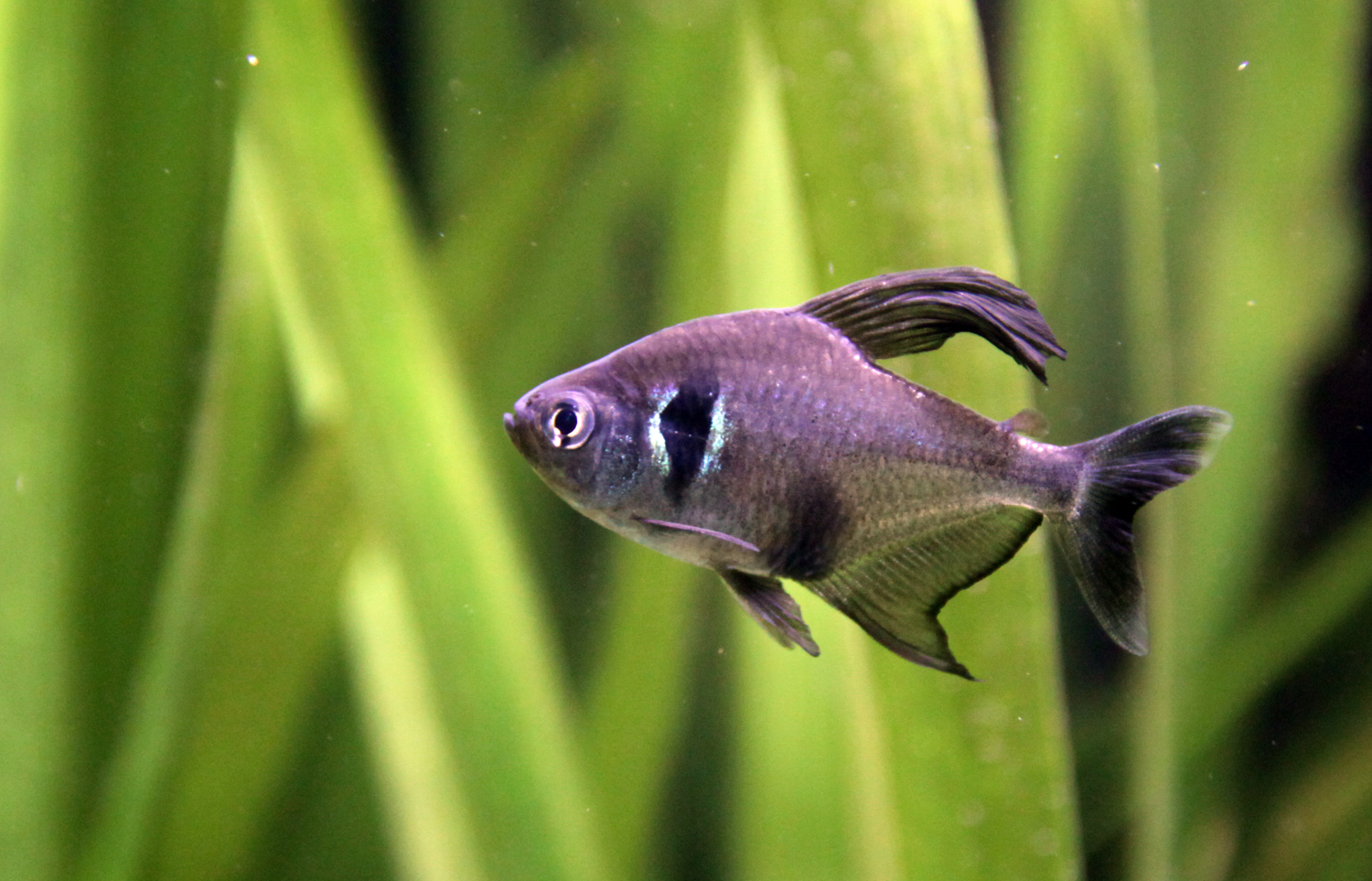
- Male

Conservation status
- Least Concern (IUCN 3.1)

Scientific classification
- Kingdom: Animalia
- Phylum: Chordata
- Class: Actinopterygii
- Order: Characiformes
- Family: Acestrorhamphidae
- Subfamily: Megalamphodinae
- Genus: Megalamphodus
- Species: M. megalopterus

Binomial name
- Megalamphodus megalopterus C. H. Eigenmann, 1915

Synonyms
- Hyphessobrycon megalopterus (C. H. Eigenmann, 1915); Megalamphodus rogoaguae Pearson 1924

= Black phantom tetra =

Species of fish

The black phantom tetra (Megalamphodus megalopterus) is a species of freshwater ray-finned fish belonging to the family Acestrorhamphidae, the American characins. This species is found in South America, in Bolivia and Brazil. It is a common species in the aquarium trade.

== Taxonomy ==
The black phantom tetra was first formally described in 1915 by the German-born American ichthyologist Carl H. Eigenmann, with its type locality given as Cáceres, Mato Grosso in Brazil. At the same time as he was describing this new species, Eigenmann was proposing the new genus Megalamphodus, and he designated M. megalopterus as its type species. Before 2024, this genus was considered to be a synonym of Hyphessobrycon but was recognised as valid in 2024, and designated as the type genus of the subfamily Megalamphodinae, the red tetras, within the American characin family, Acestrorhamphidae. This family is classified within the suborder Characoidei of the order Characiformes.

== Etymology ==
The black phantom tetra is the type species of the genus Megalamphodus, which is Greek and means "with spacious ways", a name coined by Carl H. Eigenmann, which he gave no explanation for. It may be an allusion to the "very large" fontanels, the frontal bones being described as "entirely separate", that is, with a space between them and the parietal bones. The specific name, megalopterus, means "large finned", likely an allusion to the high dorsal fin.

== Description ==
The black phantom tetra has the roughly tetragonal shape typical of the American characins, light grey in coloring and sometimes pitch black depending on genetics, with a black patch, surrounded by iridescent silver edging, posterior of the gills on each side. The male's fins are black, as is the female's dorsal fin; the female's pelvic, anal, and adipose fins are reddish in color. A long-finned variety, apparently developed by captive breeders, is sometimes sold in the aquarium trade. The black phantom tetra reaches a maximum standard length of 1.75 in (4.4 cm).

In the wild, at least some, black phantom tetras are actually more red in colour. At their original collection point, the Guaporé River Basin, the black morph was popularized to the hobby in the 1930s through German importers. However, 700km south at the Southern Pantanal Wetlands, the naturally-occurring morph is red. This should not be confused with Megalamphodus sweglesi, the red phantom tetra.

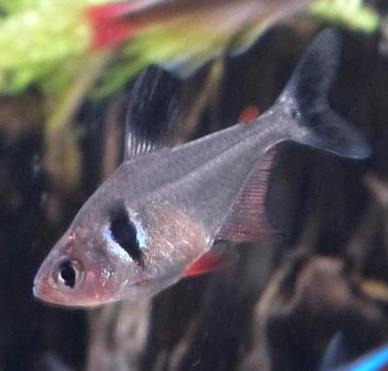
A female black phantom tetra identified by its reddish pelvic, anal and adipose fins

The male black phantom tetras have longer fins than the females. When in breeding condition, the females become plumper, but the biggest difference is in their colour. The males have no red, while the smaller fins of the female are red both on the top and underneath. The adipose fin, on the top of the body behind the larger dorsal fin, is much more noticeable in the females than the males, because in females it is red while in the males it is grey. The female's dorsal fin has a more intense black than the male's. When the fish are in breeding condition, the colours of both sexes become more distinct, with the male showing its black fins more obviously.

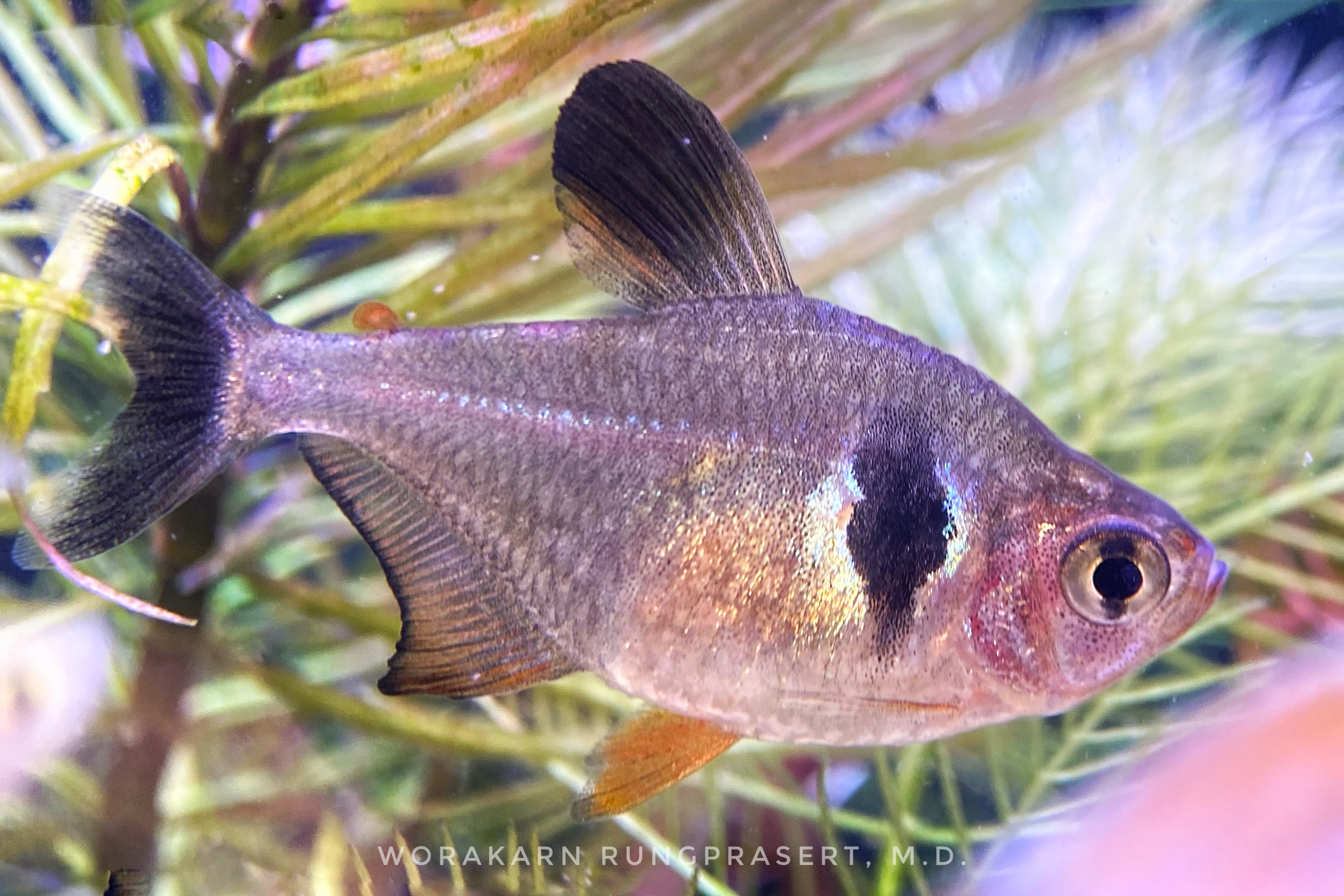
Male black phantom tetra

== Distribution and habitat ==
The black phantom tetra is found in South America, where it occurs in the upper basins of the Guaporé River and the Paraguay River in Bolivia and Brazil. Here it is found in slow flowing waters, typically on floodplain areas, preferring habitats with abundant aquatic vegetation.

== Biology ==
The black phantom tetra will form mixed shoals with other species, such as the serpae tetra (M. eques), and these tend to remain close to the shore, where they forage among roots, fallen branches and in the vicinity of marginal and aquatic vegetation. They are frequently collected from the shady spaces below beds of water hyacinth (Pontederia crassipes). The roots of the water hyacinth offer safe haven for numerous small fishes, as well as providing food in the abundance of insects which live among and on them. They breed in the wet season when the floodplians become inundated, giving these omnivorous fishe access to more areas to feed and scatter eggs.

== Utilisation ==
The black phantom tetra is a popular fish in the aquarium trade; however, almost all the fish featuring in that trade are captive bred.

== See also ==
- Community fish
- List of freshwater aquarium fish species
