= Jacques Burkhardt =

Swiss scientific illustrator (1808–1867)

- Born: November 18, 1808; Burgdorf, Switzerland
- Died: February 20, 1867 (aged 58); Boston, Massachusetts, US
- Occupations: Artist, scientific illustrator
- Employer: Louis Agassiz
- Known for: Thayer Expedition

Jacques Burkhardt (November 18, 1808 – February 20, 1867) was a Swiss scientific illustrator. In 1865, he joined Harvard naturalist Louis Agassiz's Thayer Expedition to Brazil, where he produced hundreds of sketches and watercolors of Brazilian fish and other fauna. The Ernst Mayr Library of the Museum of Comparative Zoology at Harvard University holds most of Burkhardt's illustrations, which have been digitized and made freely available online.

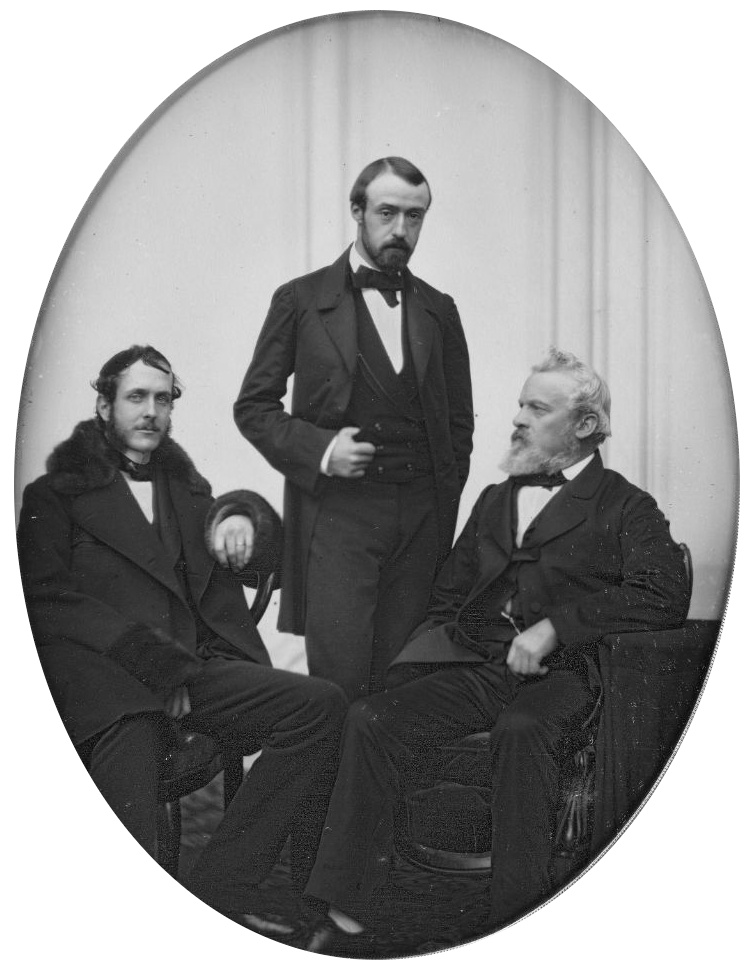
Daguerreotype: Jacques Burkhardt (right) with Theodore Lyman (left) and Alexander Agassiz c. 1860

== Life and career ==
Burkhardt was born near Burgdorf, Switzerland, in 1808. He studied in Munich and Rome and worked as Louis Agassiz’s full-time artist in Neuchâtel during the 1840s. He followed Agassiz to the United States in 1847 and continued to draw and paint zoological specimens in support of Agassiz's research at Harvard University. His turtle illustrations in Agassiz's four-volume Contributions to the Natural History of the United States (1857–1862) cemented Burkhardt's reputation as a scientific illustrator. In 1865 and 1866, he produced hundreds of zoological drawings and landscapes as a member of the Thayer Expedition in Brazil, where he reproduced in pencil or watercolor as many as 20 specimens a day. The Ernst Mayr Library holds 976 of his scientific drawings, including 458 watercolors and sketches of Brazilian fish and other fauna from the Thayer Expedition.

Burkhardt died in the Boston neighborhood of Jamaica Plain on February 20, 1867, less than a year after returning to Massachusetts. According to Agassiz, the heat and hardships that Burkhardt experienced in Brazil had fatally aggravated the artist's unspecified illness.
