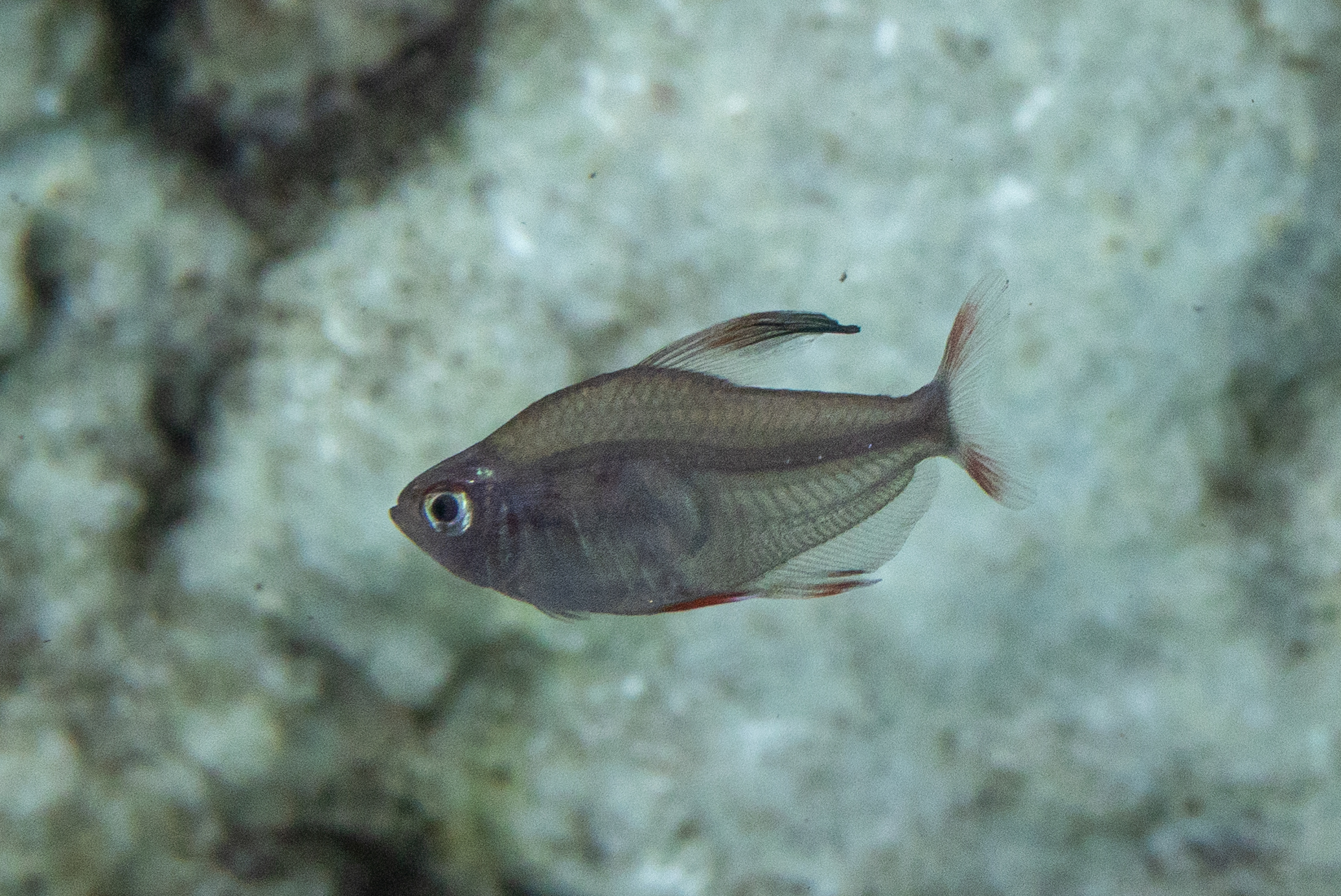

Conservation status
- Least Concern (IUCN 3.1)

Scientific classification
- Kingdom: Animalia
- Phylum: Chordata
- Class: Actinopterygii
- Division: Teleostei
- Order: Characiformes
- Family: Acestrorhamphidae
- Subfamily: Megalamphodinae
- Genus: Megalamphodus
- Species: M. bentosi

Binomial name
- Megalamphodus bentosi (Durbin, 1908)

Synonyms
- Hyphessobrycon bentosi Durbin, 1908

= Megalamphodus bentosi =

Ornate tetra

Species of fish

Megalamphodus bentosi, the Bentos tetra, ornate tetra or candy cane tetra, is a species of freshwater ray-finned fish belonging to the family Acestrorhamphidae, the American tetras. This species is found in sluggish tributaries of the Amazon Basin in Brazil and Peru. Occasionally, it makes its way into the aquarium trade. It has often been confused with the rosy tetra.

== Etymology and taxonomy ==
This fish was named in memory of a Colonel Bentos, who was a volunteer on the Thayer Expedition to Brazil (1865–1866), during which the type specimen was collected. The genus Megalamphodus is classified within the subfamily Megalamphodinae, the red tetras, of the family Acestrorhamphidae.

== Description ==
The ornate tetra can grow up to 4 cm (1.6 in). It is silvery pink, and has a dark spot around the gills, which distinguishes it from the rosy tetra. Its dorsal fin is black and has a white tip. Males have longer dorsal and anal fins, and appear slightly larger than females.

== Distribution and habitat ==
The ornate tetra lives in sluggish tributaries of the Amazon River and associated flood plain lakes. It is a benthopelagic fish and is often found in creeks and around submerged vegetation.

== Diet ==
It is an omnivorous fish that feeds on small invertebrates.

== In the aquarium ==
Ornate tetras are kept in the aquarium hobby. Most individuals in the aquarium trade are bred commercially over collecting them in the wild. They have been sold as bentos tetras, white tip tetras, or false rosy tetras in certain stores.
