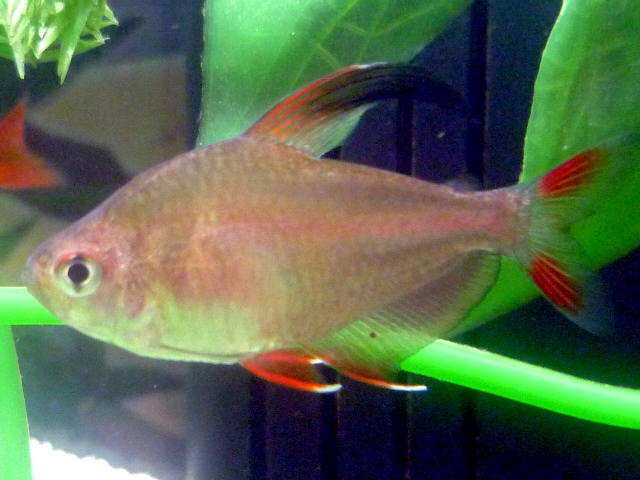
- Male, black fin variant

Conservation status
- Least Concern (IUCN 3.1)

Scientific classification
- Kingdom: Animalia
- Phylum: Chordata
- Class: Actinopterygii
- Division: Teleostei
- Order: Characiformes
- Family: Acestrorhamphidae
- Subfamily: Megalamphodinae
- Genus: Megalamphodus
- Species: M. rosaceus

Binomial name
- Megalamphodus rosaceus (Durbin, 1909)

Synonyms
- Hyphessobrycon rosaceus Durbin, 1909; Hyphessobrycon ornatus Ahl, 1934

= Rosy tetra =

Species of fish

The rosy tetra (Megalamphodus rosaceus) is a species of freshwater ray-finned fish belonging to the family Acestrorhamphidae, the American characins. This fish is found in northern South America. It is popular in the aquarium trade.

== Taxonomy ==
The rosy tetra was first formally described as Hyphessobrycon copelandi in 1909 by the American entomologist and ichthyologist Marion Durbin Ellis, with its type locality given as Gluck Island in the Essequibo River, Guyana. This is a river island located at around 6°00' to 6°05'N, 58°36'W. In 2024, this species was reclassified in the genus Megalamphodus which had been proposed by Carl H. Eigenmann in 1915, and is the type genus of the subfamily Megalamphodinae, the red tetras, within the American tetra family, Acestrorhamphidae. This family is classified within the suborder Characoidei of the order Characiformes.

== Etymology ==
The rosy tetra is classified in the genus Megalamphodus, which is Greek and means "with spacious ways", a name coined by Carl H. Eigenmann which he gave no explanation for. It may be an allusion to the "very large" fontanels, the frontal bones being described as "entirely separate", that is, with a space between them and the parietal bones. The specific name, roaceus, is Latin and means "made of roses", i.e. rose-coloured, an allusion to the rosy tints on the scales of the lower flanks.

== Description ==
The rosy tetra has a maximum standard length of 3.4 cm (1.3 in). This species and M. bentosi are very similar and can be easily confused. They can be told apart by the presence of a dark humeral spot in M. bentosi which is absent in this species. Males develop elongated fins as they mature and are typically more intensely coloured, larger and slimmer than females.

== Distribution and habitat ==
The rosy tetra is found in northern South America in Guyana and Suriname, where it occurs in the drainages of the Essequibo, Courantyne and Suriname Rivers. This species appears to prefer clear water streams with slow currents and abundant aquatic vegetation.

== Utilisation ==
The rosy tetra is a popular species in the aquarium trade.
