= Blind tetra =

Blind tetra is a common name for several cave dwelling fishes and may refer to:

- Astyanax mexicanus, native to Texas and Mexico
- Stygichthys typhlops, native to Brazil
