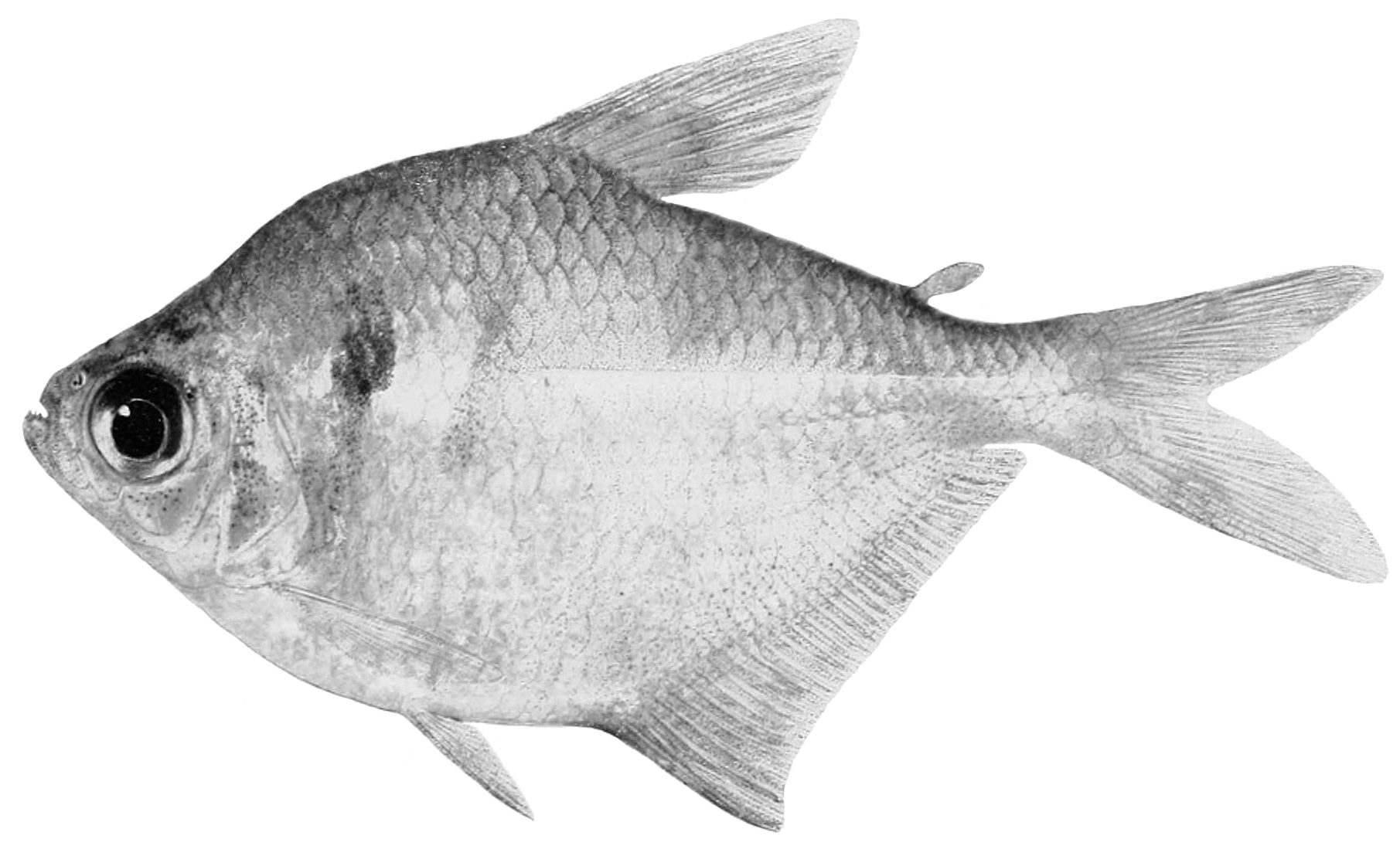

Conservation status
- Least Concern (IUCN 3.1)

Scientific classification
- Kingdom: Animalia
- Phylum: Chordata
- Class: Actinopterygii
- Order: Characiformes
- Family: Acestrorhamphidae
- Genus: Gymnocorymbus
- Species: G. thayeri

Binomial name
- Gymnocorymbus thayeri C. H. Eigenmann, 1908

= Gymnocorymbus thayeri =

Species of fish

Gymnocorymbus thayeri, the false black tetra, silver tetra, silver widow tetra or pataca, is a species of freshwater ray-finned fish belonging to the family Acestrorhamphidae, the American characins. This species is found in South America.
