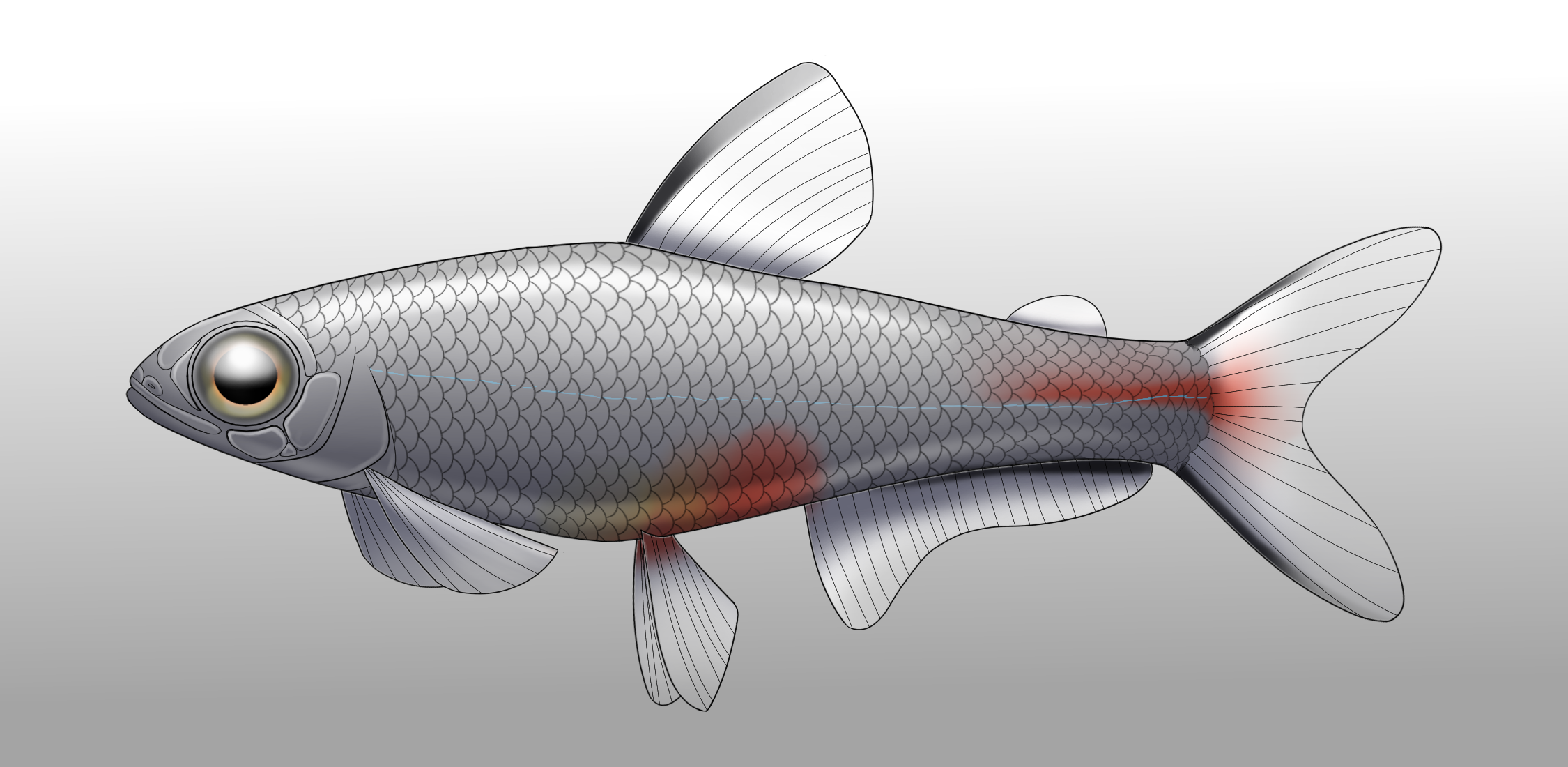
- Brittanichthys axelrodi illustration

Scientific classification
- Kingdom: Animalia
- Phylum: Chordata
- Class: Actinopterygii
- Order: Characiformes
- Family: Acestrorhamphidae
- Subfamily: Megalamphodinae
- Genus: Brittanichthys; Géry, 1965

Type species
- Brittanichthys axelrodi Géry, 1965

= Brittanichthys =

Genus of fishes

Brittanichthys is a genus of freshwater ray-finned fishes belonging to the family Acestrorhamphidae, the American tetras. The fishes in this genus are endemic to the Rio Negro basin in South America.

== Species ==
Brittanichthys contains te following valid species:

- Brittanichthys axelrodi Géry, 1965
- Brittanichthys myersi Géry, 1965

== Etymology ==
The genus Brittanichthys is named in honor of ichthyologist Martin Ralph Brittan, Sacramento State College, California, who discovered both species. The specific name of B. axelrodi honors pet-book publisher Herbert R. Axelrod, whose T.F.H. Fund sponsored the expedition that collected the type specimen. The specific name of B. myersi honors the Stanford University ichthyologist George S. Myers, "a long-time student of South American fishes".
