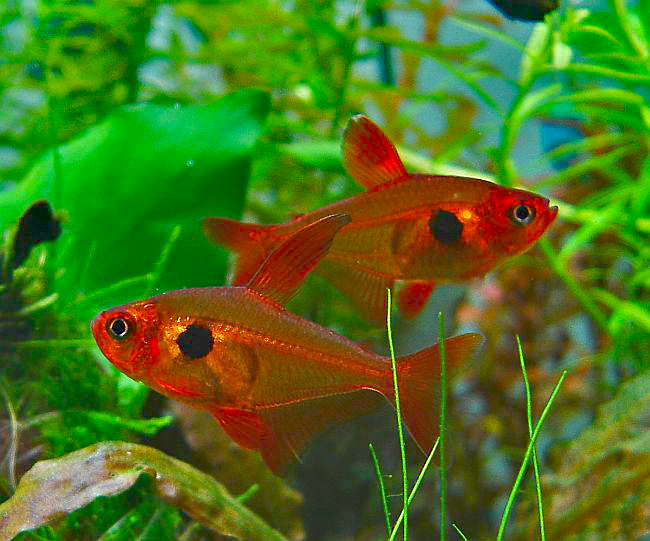

Conservation status
- Least Concern (IUCN 3.1)

Scientific classification
- Kingdom: Animalia
- Phylum: Chordata
- Class: Actinopterygii
- Division: Teleostei
- Order: Characiformes
- Family: Acestrorhamphidae
- Subfamily: Megalamphodinae
- Genus: Megalamphodus
- Species: M. sweglesi

Binomial name
- Megalamphodus sweglesi Géry, 1961

Synonyms
- Hyphessobrycon sweglesi (Gery, 1961)

= Megalamphodus sweglesi =

Species of fish

Megalamphodus sweglesi, commonly known as the red phantom tetra, is a species of freshwater ray-finned fish belonging to the family Acestrorhamphidae, the American characins. This fish is found in the Orinoco River drainage basin in South America.

== Taxonomy ==
Megalamphodus sweglesi was first formally described in 1977 by the French ichthyologist Jacques Géry, with its type locality given as the River Muco in the upper Río Orinoco basin of Colombia. This species was classified in the genus Hyphessobrycon until 2024, when this species, alongside a number of others, was reclassified in the genus Megalamphodus, which had been proposed by Carl H. Eigenmann in 1915 and is the type genus of the subfamily Megalamphodinae, the red tetras, within the American tetra family, Acestrorhamphidae. This family is classified within the suborder Characoidei of the order Characiformes.

== Etymology ==
Megalamphodus sweglesi is classified in the genus Megalamphodus, which is Greek and means "with spacious ways", a name coined by Carl H. Eigenmann which he gave no explanation for. It may be an allusion to the "very large" fontanels, the frontal bones being described as “entirely separate”', that is, with a space between them and the parietal bones. The specific name honours Kyle Swegle, an American fish trader who collected the holotype.

== Description ==
Megalamphodus sweglesi has a maximum standard length of 3.2 cm (1.3 in). This species has no less than three colour forms, varying from a silvery, transparent form through to a red form. It is thought that the colour is determined by habitat, with the lighter coloured fishes being found in clear waters, and the red forms coming from blackwater. This species is shallow bodied in comparison to its congeners, with its depth fitting into its standard length 2.71 to 2.9 times. There is a black humeral spot, and females can have a black stripe, with cream edges, running along their dorsal fin.

== Distribution and habitat ==
Megalamphodus sweglesi is found in Colombia and Venezuela in the Orinoco basin. It is typically found in clear or tannin-stained water with high visibility, frequently among submerged aquatic plants, in both streams and lentic waters.

== Utilisation ==
Megalamphodus sweglesi is collected for and traded in the aquarium trade.
