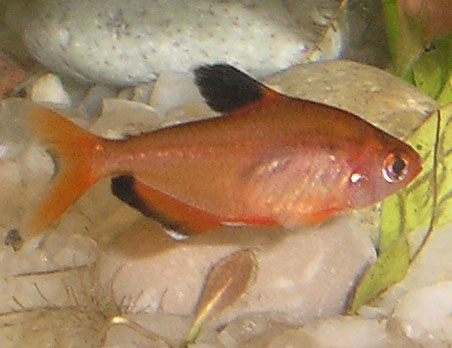

Conservation status
- Least Concern (IUCN 3.1)

Scientific classification
- Kingdom: Animalia
- Phylum: Chordata
- Class: Actinopterygii
- Order: Characiformes
- Family: Acestrorhamphidae
- Subfamily: Megalamphodinae
- Genus: Megalamphodus
- Species: M. eques

Binomial name
- Megalamphodus eques (Steindachner, 1882)
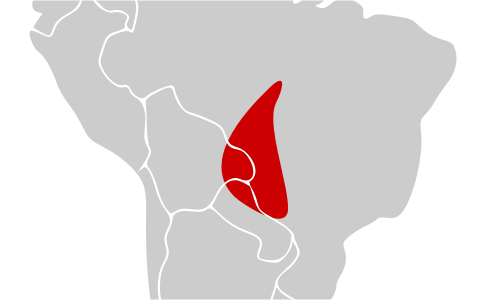
- Natural range in South America

Synonyms
- Chirodon eques Steindachner, 1882; Cheirodon eques (Steindachner, 1882); Hyphessobrycon eques (Steindachner, 1882); Tetragonopterus callistus Boulenger, 1900; Hyphessobrycon callistus (Boulenger, 1900); Hemigrammus melasopterus C. H. Eigenmann & Kennedy, 1903; Hyphessobrycon serpae Durbin, 1908

= Serpae tetra =

Species of fish

The serpae tetra (Megalamphodus eques), also known as the Red Minor tetra, Callistus tetra, jewel tetra or blood characin, is a species of freshwater ray-finned fish belonging to the family Acestrorhamphidae, the American tetras. This species is found in South America.

== Taxonomy ==
The serpae tetra was first formally described as Chirodon eques in 1882 by the Austrian ichthyologist Franz Steindachner, with its type locality given as Villa Bella and Obidos on the Amazon River in Brazil. The genus name should have been spelt Cheirodon. In 2024, this species was reclassified in the genus Megalamphodus, which had been proposed by Carl H. Eigenmann in 1915 and is the type genus of the subfamily Megalamphodinae, the red tetras, within the American tetra family, Acestrorhamphidae. This family is classified within the suborder Characoidei of the order Characiformes.

== Etymology ==
The serpae tetra is classified in the genus Megalamphodus, which is Greek and means "with spacious ways", a name coined by Carl H. Eigenmann which he gave no explanation for. It may be an allusion to the "very large" fontanelles, the frontal bones being described as "entirely separate", that is, with a space between them and the parietal bones. The specific name, eques, means "horseman" or "rider", an allusion Steindachner did not explain but which may refer to the saddle-like mark on each side. Steindachner used this name for other fishes with similar markings.

== Description ==
The serpae tetra has a maximum standard length of 4 cm (1.6 in), and the body is laterally compressed and high. The overall colour is reddish-olive, brightening to scarlet along the flanks. There is a comma shaped black humeral spot and the dorsal fin is black, with the anal and caudal fins being red.

== Distribution and habitat ==
The serpae tetra has a disjunct native range, with subpopulations in the Amazon basin of Brazil and in the La Plata basin in Argentina, Brazil, Bolivia, Paraguay and Uruguay. It has also been introduced to French Guiana and eastern Brazil. Its preferred habitat includes slow-flowing tributaries, floodplain lakes and associated flooded environments. It readily colonises anthropogenic aquatic habitats, such as artificial ponds and reservoirs. It is normally found close to submerged aquatic vegetation.

== In the aquarium ==
The serpae tetra is one of the most popular fishes in the aquarium trade, but almost all of the fishes traded are captive bred, and few are taken from the wild.

Despite being widely sold at large chain pet stores, the species is notoriously and widely known to be aggressive both to conspecifics and community aquarium tankmates.

== See also ==
- List of freshwater aquarium fish species
