= Jacques Géry =

French ichthyologist

- Born: 12 March 1917-- Paris
- Died: 15 June 2007 (aged 90); Sarlat-la-Canéda, Dordogne, France
- Known for: Describing numerous species
- Scientific career
- Author abbrev. (zoology): Géry

Jacques Géry (12 March 1917, Paris – 15 June 2007, Sarlat, France) was a French ichthyologist and Doctor of Medicine.

The most notable species he described are:

- Green neon tetra, Paracheirodon simulans (Géry, 1963)
- Black neon tetra, Hyphessobrycon herbertaxelrodi (Géry, 1961)
- Royal tetra, Inpaichthys kerri (Géry & Junk, 1977)
- Rummy-nose tetra, Hemigrammus bleheri (Géry & Mahnert, 1986)
- Red phantom tetra, Hyphessobrycon sweglesi (Géry, 1961)
- Brittanichthys axelrodi (Géry, 1965)
- Brittanichthys myersi (Géry, 1965)

== See also ==
- Category:Taxa named by Jacques Géry
