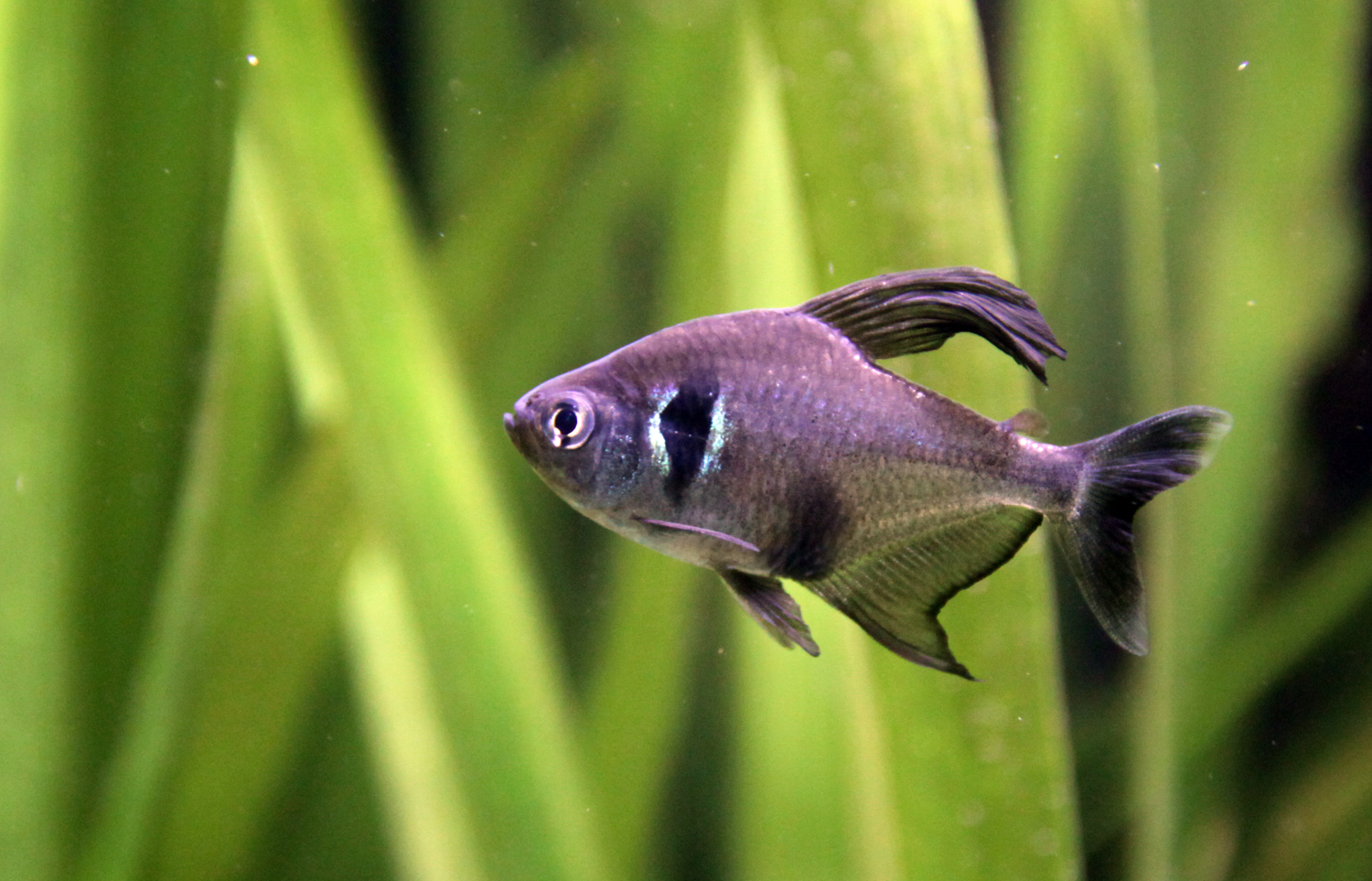
- black phantom tetra (Megalamphodus megalopterus),the type species of the genus Megalamphodus.

Scientific classification
- Kingdom: Animalia
- Phylum: Chordata
- Class: Actinopterygii
- Order: Characiformes
- Family: Acestrorhamphidae
- Subfamily: Megalamphodinae; Carvalho, Lima & Melo, 2024

Type genus
- Megalamphodus C. H. Eigenmann, 1915

Genera
- See text

= Megalamphodinae =

Subfamily of fishes

Megalamphodinae is a subfamily of freshwater ray-finned fishes belonging to the family Acestrorhamphidae, the American tetras. The fishes in this subfamily are known as red tetras and are found in South America.

== Genera ==
Megalamphodinae contains the following genera:

- Axelrodia Géry, 1965
- Brittanichthys Géry, 1965
- Makunaima Terán, Benitez & Mirande, 2020
- Megalamphodus C. H. Eigenmann, 1915
- Paracheirodon Géry, 1960
- Petitella Géry & Boutière, 1964
