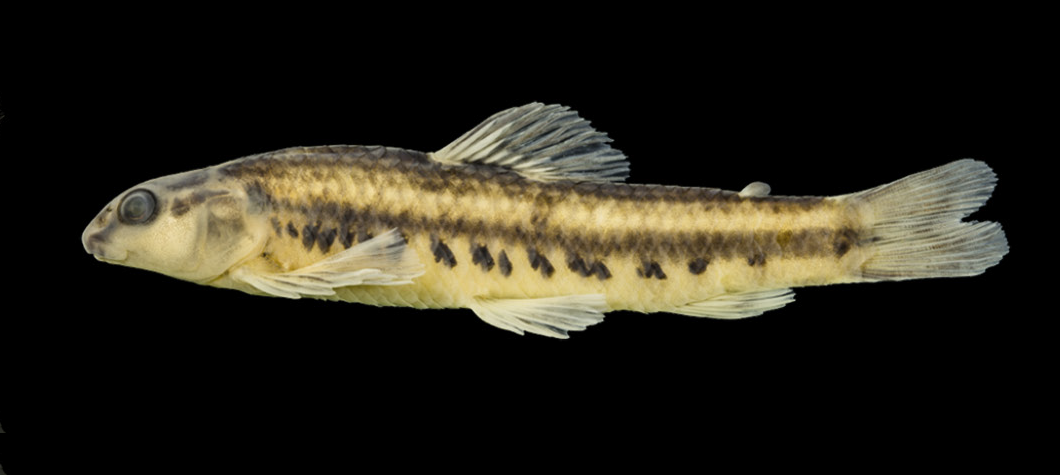

Conservation status
- Least Concern (IUCN 3.1)

Scientific classification
- Kingdom: Animalia
- Phylum: Chordata
- Class: Actinopterygii
- Order: Characiformes
- Family: Crenuchidae
- Genus: Characidium
- Species: C. lauroi

Binomial name
- Characidium lauroi Travassos, 1949

= Characidium lauroi =

Species of fish

Characidium lauroi is a fish in the family Crenuchidae. It is native to South America and is found in the middle and upper Paraíba do Sul River basin in Brazil.

== Size ==
This species reaches a length of 7.1 cm (2.8 in).

== Etymology ==
The fish is named in honor of the Travassos' father, a helminthologist-entomologist Lauro Travassos (1890–1970), who collected the holotype specimen.
