= Odontocharacidium aphanes =

Conservation status
- Least Concern (IUCN 3.1)

Scientific classification
- Kingdom: Animalia
- Phylum: Chordata
- Class: Actinopterygii
- Order: Characiformes
- Family: Crenuchidae
- Genus: Odontocharacidium; Buckup, 1993
- Species: O. aphanes

Binomial name
- Odontocharacidium aphanes (S. H. Weitzman & Kanazawa, 1977)

Species of fish

Odontocharacidium aphanes, the green dwarf tetra, is a species of South American darter found in the Amazon River basin. It is found in the countries of Brazil, Colombia, Peru and Venezuela.
