= Alípio de Miranda Ribeiro =

Brazilian herpetologist and ichthyologist (1874–1939)

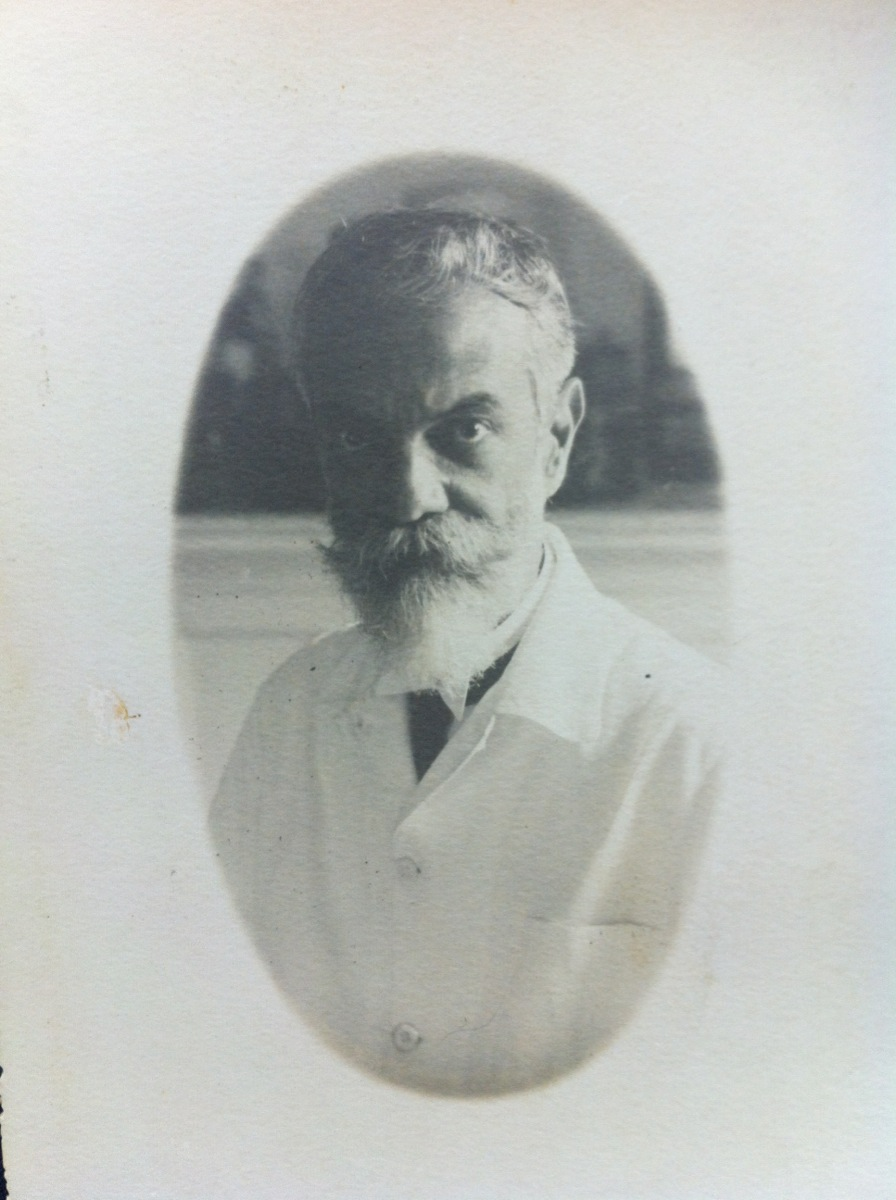
Alípio de Miranda-Ribeiro

Alípio de Miranda Ribeiro (21 February 1874, Rio Preto, Minas Gerais – 8 January 1939) was a Brazilian herpetologist and ichthyologist. His son, Paulo de Miranda-Ribeiro (1901–1965), was also a zoologist.

From an early age Alípio de Miranda Ribeiro had a passion for natural history; as an adolescent he translated works of Buffon into Portuguese. He studied medicine in Rio de Janeiro, and from 1894 worked as a preparator at the National Museum of Brazil. Here he later served as secretary (from 1899), and director of the department of zoology (from 1929).

During his career he explored the Amazon region many times, and under the direction of Candido Rondon (1865–1958) he took part in installing the first telegraph through the Amazon and Mato Grosso. In 1911, after visiting museums and fishery programs in Europe and the United States, he founded a fisheries inspectorate in Brazil, the first official services on fisheries in the nation.

In 1911 he published the highly regarded Fauna brasiliensis-Peixes (Brazilian fishes). He was also the author of numerous works in the field of herpetology.

== Taxa named in his honor ==
- Alipiopsitta a genus of yellow-faced parrots;
- Characidium alipioi Travassos, 1955, a South American darter;
- Corona ribeiroi Ihering, 1915 a Brazilian orthalicid snail;
- Drymaeus ribeiroi Ihering, 1915, a Brazilian bulimulid snail;
- Glanidium ribeiroi Haseman, 1911 a South American catfish species;
- Hemitriccus mirandae the Buff-breasted Tody-Tyrant, a bird species from Brazil;
- Ribeiroia a genus of trematode parasites of amphibians;
- Talaus ribeiroi Moreira, 1912, a fish louse species, now considered to be a synonym of Dipteropeltis hirundo Calman, 1912.

== Taxon described by him ==
- See Category:Taxa named by Alípio de Miranda-Ribeiro
