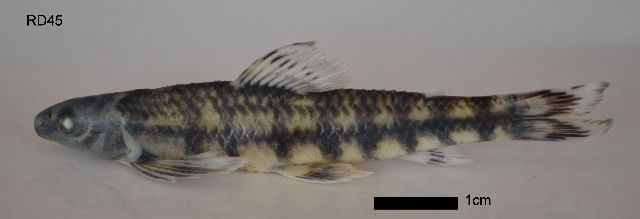

Conservation status
- Least Concern (IUCN 3.1)

Scientific classification
- Kingdom: Animalia
- Phylum: Chordata
- Class: Actinopterygii
- Division: Teleostei
- Order: Characiformes
- Family: Crenuchidae
- Genus: Characidium
- Species: C. timbuiense

Binomial name
- Characidium timbuiense Travassos, 1946

= Characidium timbuiense =

Species of fish

Characidium timbuiense is a fish in the family Crenuchidae. It is native to South America and is found in the Timbuí River basin in Espírito Santo, Brazil.

== Size ==
This species reaches a length of 5.7 cm (2.2 in).

== Etymology ==
The fish's name includes a Latin suffix denoting place, "-ense," and "Timbui" for the Timbuí River basin, in Espírito Santo, Brazil, where the type locality of Córrego Valsungana, a tributary, is located.
