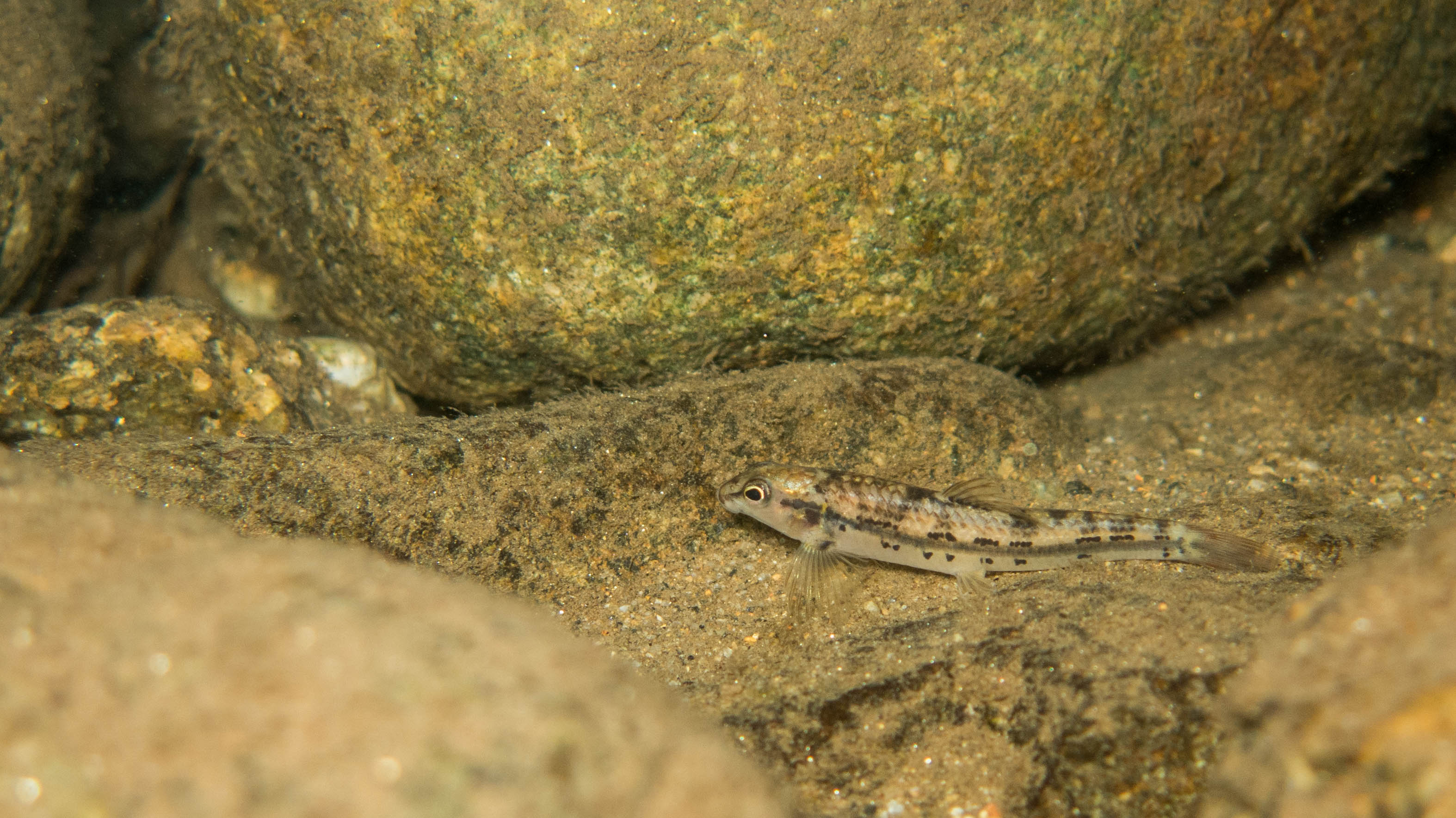

Conservation status
- Least Concern (IUCN 3.1)

Scientific classification
- Kingdom: Animalia
- Phylum: Chordata
- Class: Actinopterygii
- Order: Characiformes
- Family: Crenuchidae
- Genus: Characidium
- Species: C. japuhybense

Binomial name
- Characidium japuhybense Travassos, 1949

= Characidium japuhybense =

Species of fish

Characidium japuhybense is a fish in the family Crenuchidae. It is native to South America, and is found in the coastal streams of southeastern Brazil from the Ilha Grande Bay to Ribeira de Iguape River basin.

== Size ==
This species reaches a length of 5.5 cm (2.2 in).

== Etymology ==
The fish's name includes the Latin suffix "-ense," denoting place; and Japuhyba (Japuíba), Angra dos Reis, in the Estado do Rio de Janeiro, Brazil, which is the type locality.
