= Characidium schubarti =

Conservation status
- Least Concern (IUCN 3.1)

Scientific classification
- Kingdom: Animalia
- Phylum: Chordata
- Class: Actinopterygii
- Order: Characiformes
- Family: Crenuchidae
- Genus: Characidium
- Species: C. schubarti

Binomial name
- Characidium schubarti Travassos, 1955

Species of fish

Characidium schubarti is a fish in the family Crenuchidae. It is native to South America and is found in the Paranapanema basin in upper Paraná River drainage and Ribeira de Iguape River basin in Brazil.

== Size ==
This species reaches a length of 51.3 cm (20.2 in).

== Etymology ==
The fish is named in honor of German-born myriapodist Otto Schubart (1900–1962), of the Estação Experimental de Biologia e Piscicultura do Ministério de Agricultura in São Paulo, Brazil, who collected the holotype specimen.
