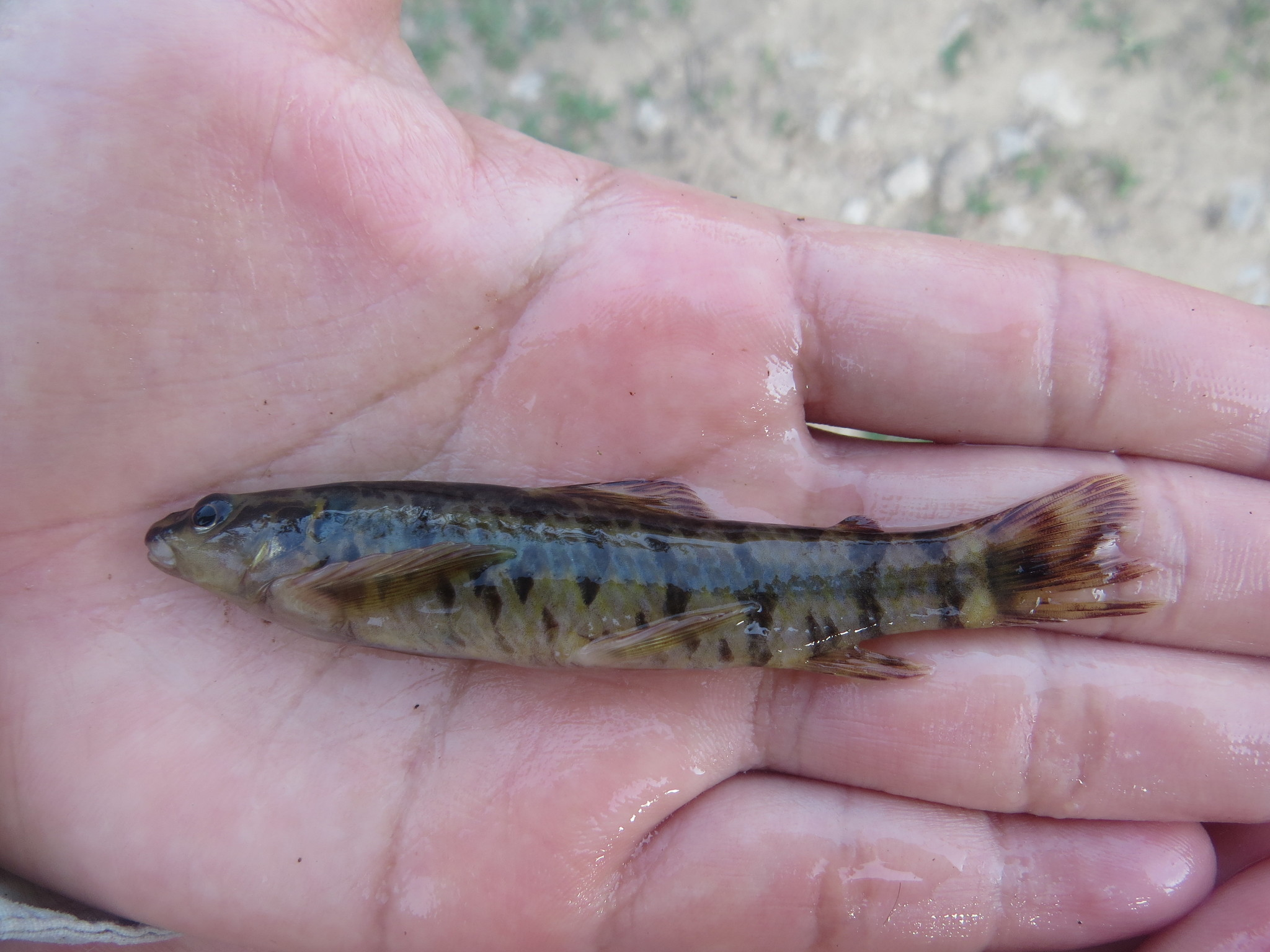

Conservation status
- Least Concern (IUCN 3.1)

Scientific classification
- Kingdom: Animalia
- Phylum: Chordata
- Class: Actinopterygii
- Order: Characiformes
- Family: Crenuchidae
- Genus: Characidium
- Species: C. vidali

Binomial name
- Characidium vidali Travassos, 1967

= Characidium vidali =

Species of fish

Characidium vidali is a fish in the family Crenuchidae. It is native to South America and is found in the northeastern tributaries of Guanabara Bay in Rio de Janeiro, Brazil.

== Size ==
This species reaches a length of 6.4 cm (2.5 in).

== Etymology ==
The fish is named in honor of geologist-paleontologist Nei Vidal, of the Universidade Federal do Rio de Janeiro
