= Characidium alipioi =

Conservation status
- Least Concern (IUCN 3.1)

Scientific classification
- Kingdom: Animalia
- Phylum: Chordata
- Class: Actinopterygii
- Order: Characiformes
- Family: Crenuchidae
- Genus: Characidium
- Species: C. alipioi

Binomial name
- Characidium alipioi Travassos, 1955

Species of fish

Characidium alipioi is a fish in the family Crenuchidae. It is native to South America and is found in the Paraíba do Sul River basin in Brazil.

== Size ==
This species reaches a length of 6.4 cm (2.5 in).

== Etymology ==
The fish is named in honor of Brazilian herpetologist and ichthyologist Alípio de Miranda-Ribeiro (1874–1939), who founded the fish collection at the Federal University of Rio de Janeiro's National Museum.
