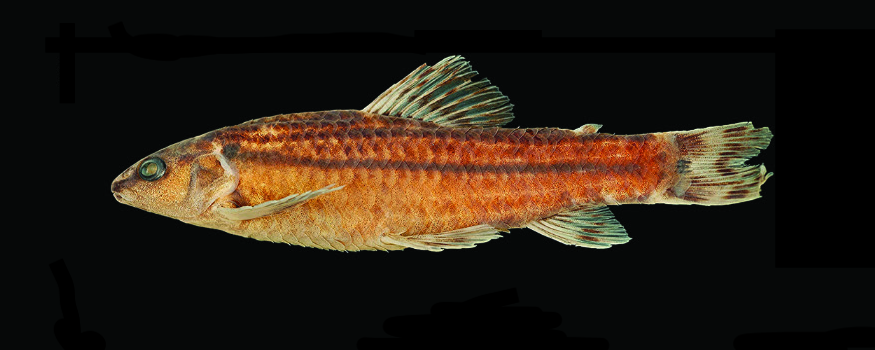
- preserved specimen

Conservation status
- Least Concern (IUCN 3.1)

Scientific classification
- Kingdom: Animalia
- Phylum: Chordata
- Class: Actinopterygii
- Order: Characiformes
- Family: Crenuchidae
- Genus: Characidium
- Species: C. gomesi

Binomial name
- Characidium gomesi Travassos, 1956

= Characidium gomesi =

Species of fish

Characidium gomesi is a fish in the family Crenuchidae. It is native to South America and is found in the Grande, Tietê and Paranapanema rivers in the upper Paraná River drainage, in Brazil. in Brazil.

== Size ==
This species reaches a length of 6.5 cm (2.6 in).

== Etymology ==
The fish is named in honor of Alcides Lourenço Gomes (1916–1991), of the Estacão Experimental de Caça e Pesca in São Paulo, Brazil, who collected so many of the paratypes in 1949 and described the similar Characidium pterostictum in the year 1947.
