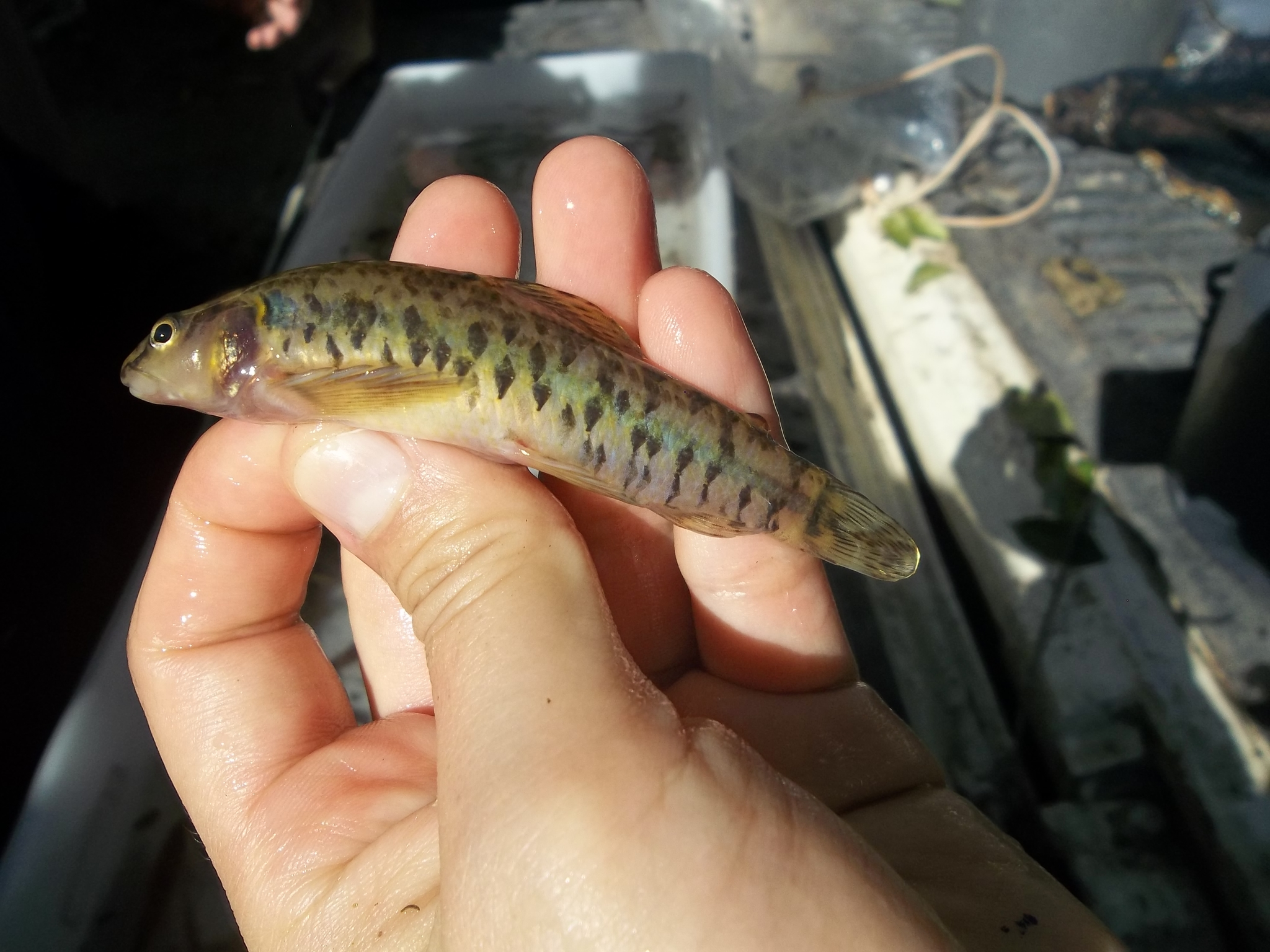

Conservation status
- Critically Endangered (IUCN 3.1)

Scientific classification
- Kingdom: Animalia
- Phylum: Chordata
- Class: Actinopterygii
- Order: Characiformes
- Family: Crenuchidae
- Genus: Characidium
- Species: C. grajahuense

Binomial name
- Characidium grajahuense Travassos, 1944

= Characidium grajahuense =

Species of fish

Characidium grajahuense is a fish in the family Crenuchidae. It is native to South America and is found in the coastal streams between Guanabara Bay and the Mangaratiba, in Rio de Janeiro, Brazil.

== Size ==
This species reaches a length of 8.8 cm (3.5 in).

== Etymology ==
The fish's name denotes a place: Grajaú, Rio de Janeiro, Brazil, which is the type locality.
