= Characidium lagosantense =

Conservation status
- Least Concern (IUCN 3.1)

Scientific classification
- Kingdom: Animalia
- Phylum: Chordata
- Class: Actinopterygii
- Order: Characiformes
- Family: Crenuchidae
- Genus: Characidium
- Species: C. lagosantense

Binomial name
- Characidium lagosantense Travassos, 1947)

Species of fish

Characidium lagosantense is a fish in the family Crenuchidae. It is native to South America and is found in the Das Velhas River basin in the São Francisco River drainage in Brazil.

== Size ==
This species reaches a length of 4.1 cm (1.6 in).

== Etymology ==
The fish's name includes "-ense," the Latin suffix denoting place; Lagoa Santa, Minas Gerais, Brazil, is the type locality.
