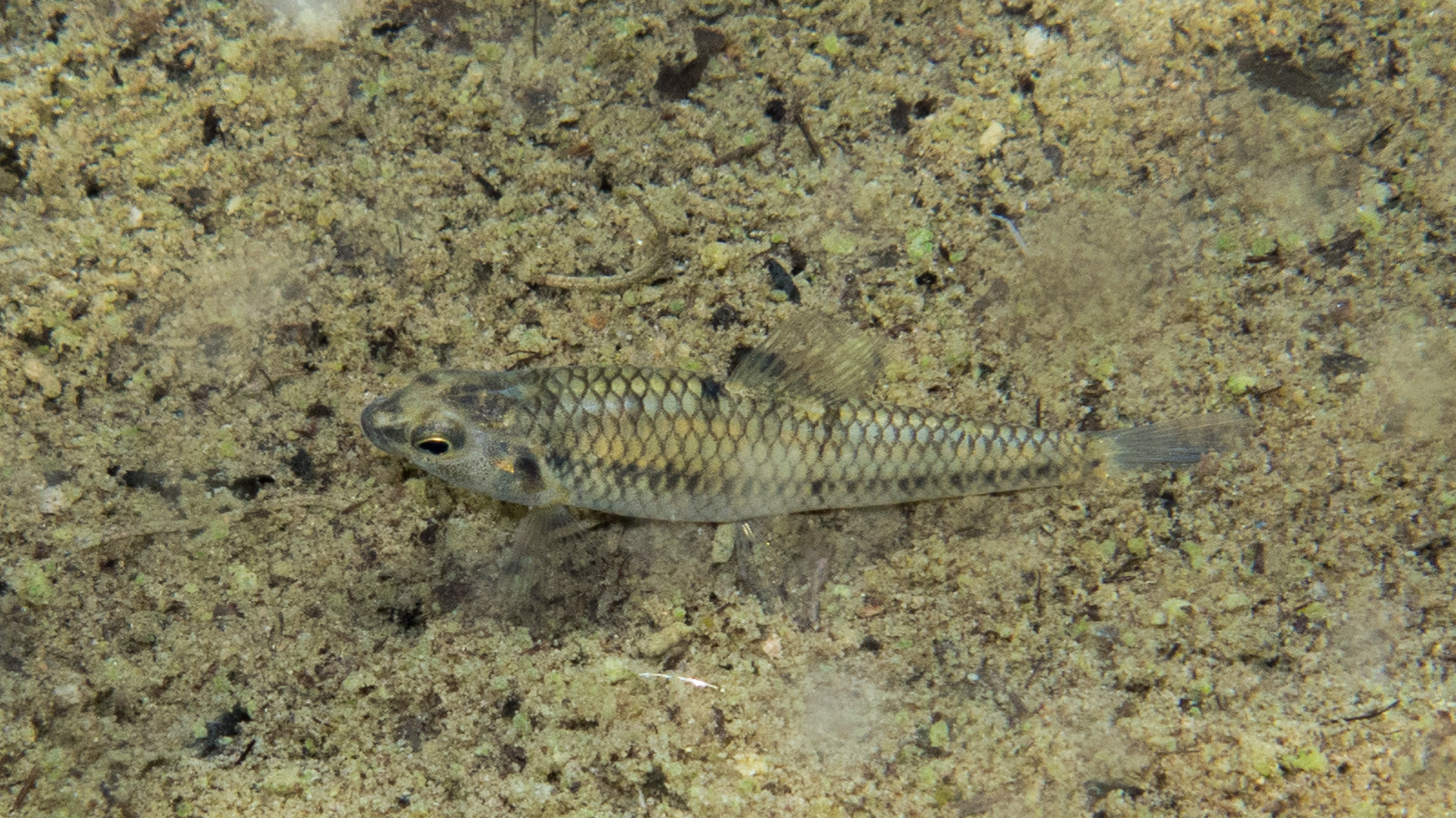

Conservation status
- Near Threatened (IUCN 3.1)

Scientific classification
- Kingdom: Animalia
- Phylum: Chordata
- Class: Actinopterygii
- Order: Characiformes
- Family: Crenuchidae
- Genus: Characidium
- Species: C. oiticicai

Binomial name
- Characidium oiticicai Travassos, 1967

= Characidium oiticicai =

Species of fish

Characidium oiticicai is a fish in the family Crenuchidae. It is native to South America and is found in the upper Tietê and Ribeira de Iguape River basins in Brazil.

== Size ==
This species reaches a length of 6.8 cm (2.7 in).

== Etymology ==
The fish is named in honor of the José Oiticica Filho (1906–1964), an entomologist, a photographer and Travassos' colleague at the Museu Nacional, Universidade Federal do Rio de Janeiro in Brazil.
