= Characidium lanei =

Conservation status
- Least Concern (IUCN 3.1)

Scientific classification
- Kingdom: Animalia
- Phylum: Chordata
- Class: Actinopterygii
- Order: Characiformes
- Family: Crenuchidae
- Genus: Characidium
- Species: C. lanei

Binomial name
- Characidium lanei Travassos, 1967

Species of fish

Characidium lanei is a fish in the family Crenuchidae. It is native to South America and is found in the coastal basins of southeastern Brazil and the Ribeira de Iguape River basin.

== Size ==
This species reaches a length of 6.5 cm (2.6 in).

== Etymology ==
The fish is named in honor of the John Lane (1905– 1963), a Brazilian medical entomologist who collected the holotype specimen.
