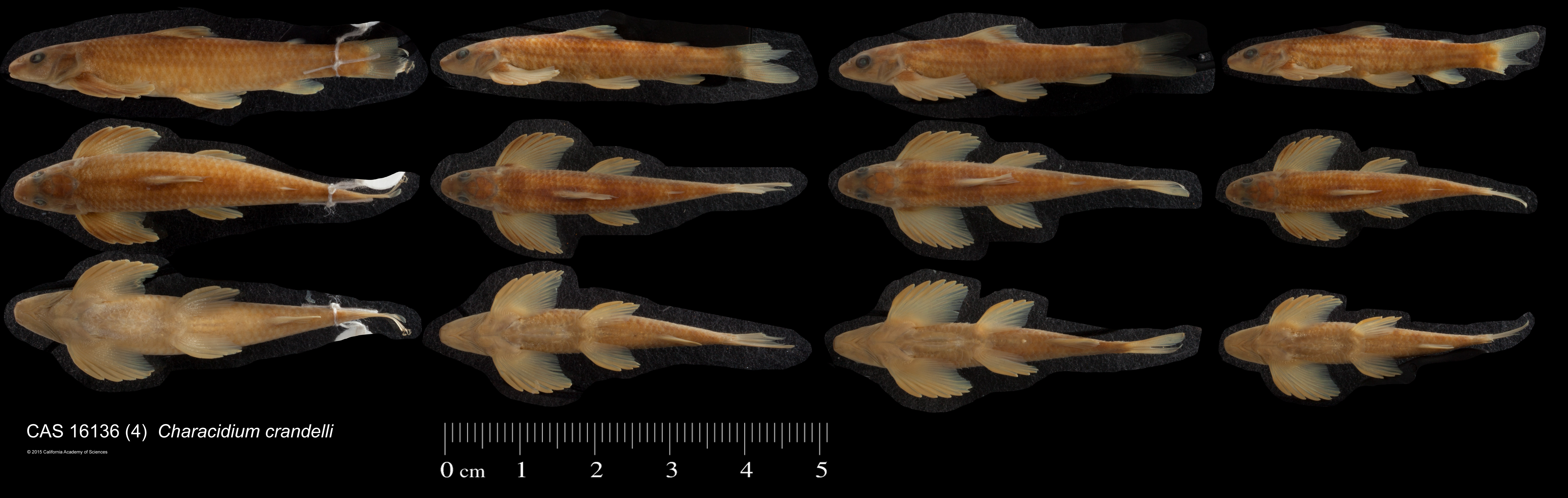

Conservation status
- Least Concern (IUCN 3.1)

Scientific classification
- Kingdom: Animalia
- Phylum: Chordata
- Class: Actinopterygii
- Order: Characiformes
- Family: Crenuchidae
- Genus: Characidium
- Species: C. crandellii

Binomial name
- Characidium crandellii Steindachner, 1915

= Characidium crandellii =

Species of fish

Characidium crandellii is a fish in the family Crenuchidae. It is native to South America and is found in the Amazon River basin.

== Size ==
This species reaches a length of 6.4 cm (2.5 in).
