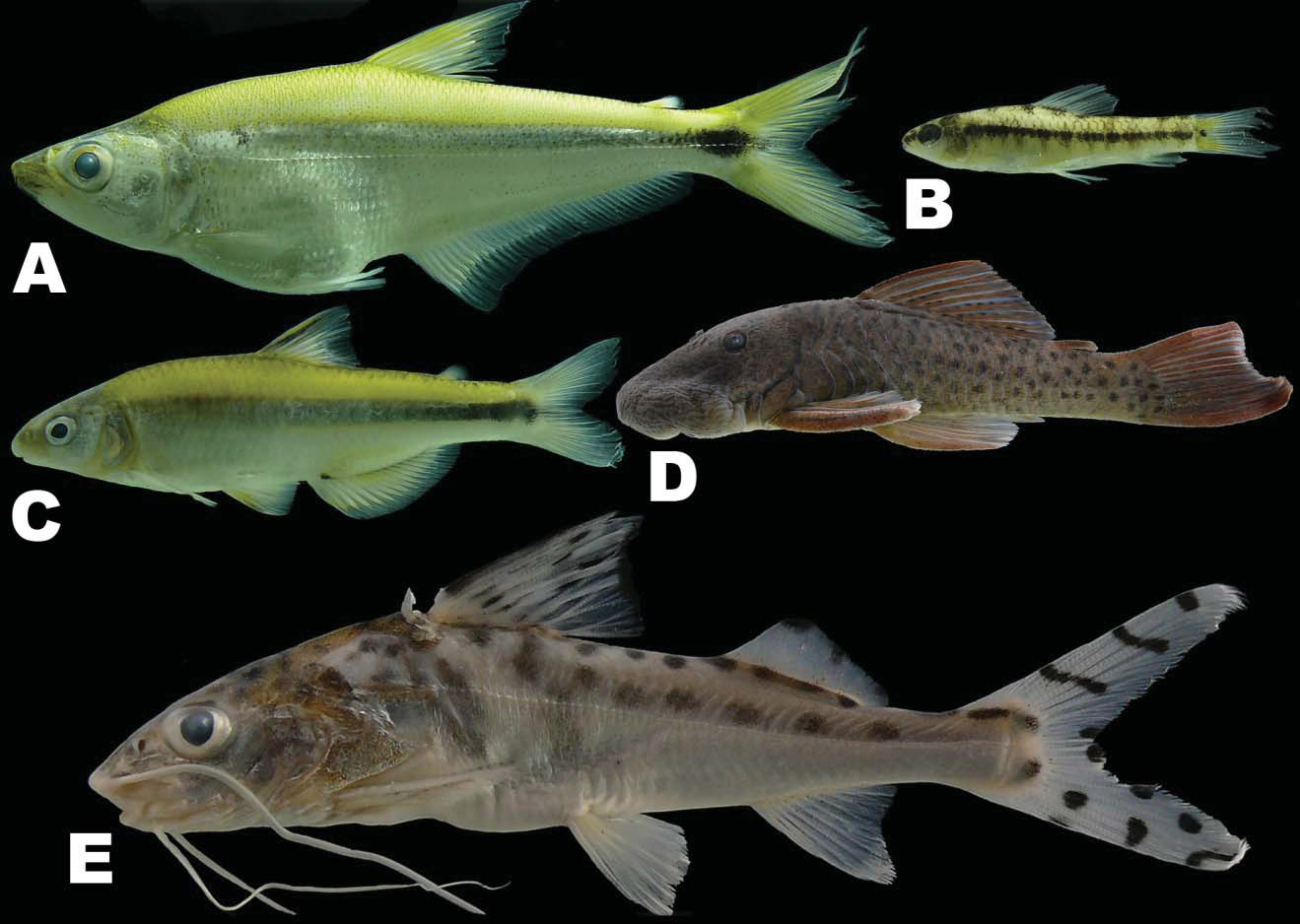
- (A) Acestrocephalus boehlkei, 79 mm. (B) Characidium sterbai, 26.7 mm. (C) Attonitus ephimeros, 48 mm. (D) Chaetostoma lineopunctatum, 52 mm. (E) Pimelodus pictus, 78 mm.

Scientific classification
- Domain: Eukaryota
- Kingdom: Animalia
- Phylum: Chordata
- Class: Actinopterygii
- Order: Characiformes
- Family: Crenuchidae
- Genus: Characidium
- Species: C. sterbai

Binomial name
- Characidium sterbai (Zarske, 1997)

Synonyms
- Geryichthys sterbai Zarske, 1997

= Characidium sterbai =

Species of fish

Characidium sterbai is a species of South American darter (family Crenuchidae) endemic to Peru where it is found in the upper Amazon River basin.
