= Darter (disambiguation) =

A darter or snakebird is a bird of the genus Anhinga.

Darter may also refer to:

== Animals ==
- Etheostomatinae, a subfamily of fish from North America
- Characidiinae, a subfamily of fish from South America and Panama
- Dragonflies of the genus Sympetrum

== Other ==
- A person who throws or uses darts
- USS Darter (SS-227), a submarine commissioned in 1943 and wrecked in 1944
- USS Darter (SS-576), a submarine in commission from 1956 to 1989
- AIS Canberra Darters, a defunct Australian netball team

== See also ==
- A-Darter and R-Darter, air-to-air missiles manufactured by Denel Dynamics
