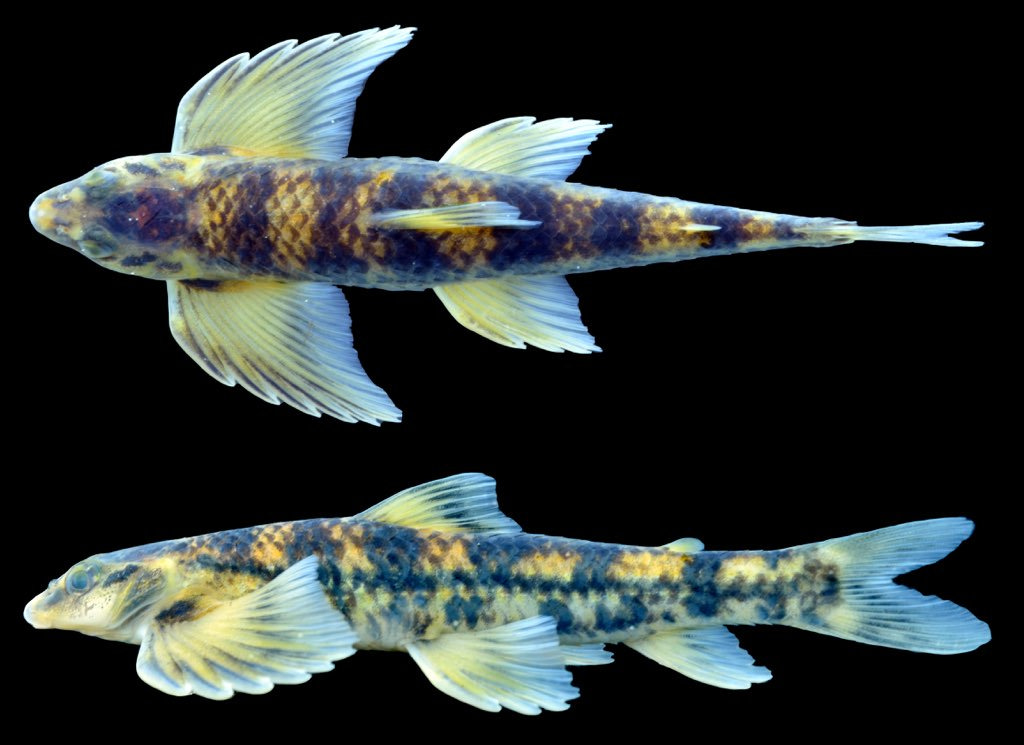

Conservation status
- Least Concern (IUCN 3.1)

Scientific classification
- Kingdom: Animalia
- Phylum: Chordata
- Class: Actinopterygii
- Order: Characiformes
- Family: Crenuchidae
- Genus: Characidium
- Species: C. declivirostre

Binomial name
- Characidium declivirostre Steindachner, 1915

= Characidium declivirostre =

Species of fish

Characidium declivirostre is a fish in the family Crenuchidae. It is native to South America and is found in the Orinoco and Amazon River basins.

== Size ==
This species reaches a length of 8.0 cm (3.1 in).
