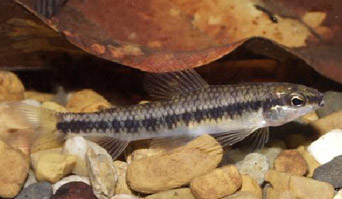
- Characidium fasciatum

Scientific classification
- Kingdom: Animalia
- Phylum: Chordata
- Class: Actinopterygii
- Order: Characiformes
- Family: Crenuchidae
- Subfamily: Characidiinae
- Genus: Characidium; J. T. Reinhardt, 1867

Type species
- Characidium fasciatum J. T. Reinhardt, 1867

Synonyms
- Chorimycterus Cope, 1894; Nanognathus Boulenger, 1895; Poecilosomatops Fowler, 1906; Microcharax C. H. Eigenmann, 1909; Jobertina Pellegrin, 1909; Melanocharacidium Buckup, 1993; Geryichthys Zarske, 1997

= Characidium =

Genus of fishes

Characidium is a genus of freshwater ray-finned fish belonging to the family Crenuchidae, the South American darters. The fishes in this genus are mainly found in South America, but C. marshi is from Panama. They are small (less than 10 cm or 4 in long), slender fish that live on the bottom in flowing fresh waters and feed on small animals such as insects.

== Species ==
Characidium contains the following recognized species:

- Characidium alipioi Travassos, 1955
- Characidium amaila Lujan, Agudelo-Zamora, Taphorn, Booth & López-Fernández, 2013
- Characidium bahiense Almeida, 1971
- Characidium barbosai Flausino Junior, Lima, Machado & Melo, 2020
- Characidium bimaculatum Fowler, 1941
- Characidium boavistae Steindachner, 1915
- Characidium boehlkei Géry, 1972
- Characidium bolivianum Pearson, 1924
- Characidium borellii (Boulenger, 1895)
- Characidium brevirostre Pellegrin, 1909
- Characidium cacah Zanata, Ribeiro, Araújo-Porto, Pessali & Oliveira-Silva, 2020
- Characidium caucanum C. H. Eigenmann, 1912
- Characidium chancoense Agudelo-Zamora, Ortega-Lara & Taphorn, 2020
- Characidium chicoi da Graça, Ota & Domingues, 2019
- Characidium chupa Schultz, 1944
- Characidium clistenesi Melo & Espíndola, 2016
- Characidium crandellii Steindachner, 1915
- Characidium cricarense Malanski, Sarmento-Soares, Silva-Malanski, Lopes, Ingenito & Buckup, 2019
- Characidium declivirostre Steindachner, 1915
- Characidium deludens Zanata & Camelier, 2015
- Characidium dule Agudelo-Zamora, Tavera, Murillo & Ortega-Lara, 2020
- Characidium dumonti Stabile, R. B. dos Reis, Oliveira & da Graça, 2025
- Characidium duplicatum Armbruster, Lujan & Bloom, 2021
- Characidium etheostoma Cope, 1872
- Characidium etzeli Zarske & Géry, 2001
- Characidium fasciatum Reinhardt, 1867
- Characidium fleurdelis Zanata, Oliveira-Silva & Ohara, 2023
- Characidium geryi (Zarske, 1997)
- Characidium gomesi Travassos, 1956
- Characidium grajahuense Travassos, 1944
- Characidium hasemani Steindachner, 1915
- Characidium heinianum Zarske & Géry, 2001
- Characidium heirmostigmata da Graça & Pavanelli, 2008
- Characidium helmeri Zanata, Sarmento-Soares & Martins-Pinheiro, 2015
- Characidium iaquira Zanata, Ohara, Oyakawa & Dagosta, 2020
- Characidium interruptum Pellegrin, 1909
- Characidium itarare Stabile, R. B. dos Reis, Frota, da Graça & Oliveira, 2024
- Characidium japuhybense Travassos, 1949
- Characidium kalunga Melo, Bouquerel, Masumoto, França & Netto-Ferreira, 2021
- Characidium kamakan Zanata & Camelier, 2015
- Characidium krenak Oliveira-Silva, Santos, Lopes & Zanata, 2022
- Characidium lagosantense Travassos, 1947
- Characidium lanei Travassos, 1967
- Characidium laterale (Boulenger, 1895)
- Characidium lauroi Travassos, 1949
- Characidium litorale Leitão & Buckup, 2014
- Characidium longum Taphorn, Montaña & Buckup, 2006
- Characidium marshi Breder, 1925
- Characidium mirim Netto-Ferreira, Birindelli & Buckup, 2013
- Characidium nambiquara Zanata & Ohara, 2020
- Characidium nana Mendonça & Netto-Ferreira, 2015
- Characidium nupelia da Graça, Pavanelli & Buckup, 2008
- Characidium occidentale Buckup & R.E. dos Reis, 1997
- Characidium oiticicai Travassos, 1967
- Characidium onca Melo, Brito Ribeiro & Lima, 2021
- Characidium orientale Buckup & R. E. dos Reis, 1997
- Characidium papachibe Peixoto & Wosiacki, 2013
- Characidium pellucidum Eigenmann, 1909
- Characidium phoxocephalum Eigenmann, 1912
- Characidium pteroides Eigenmann, 1909
- Characidium pterostictum A. L. Gomes, 1947
- Characidium pumarinri Teixeira & Melo, 2020
- Characidium purpuratum Steindachner, 1882
- Characidium rachovii Regan, 1913
- Characidium roesseli Géry, 1965
- Characidium samurai Zanata & Camelier, 2014
- Characidium sanctjohanni Dahl, 1960
- Characidium satoi Melo & Oyakawa, 2015
- Characidium schindleri Zarske & Géry, 2001
- Characidium schubarti Travassos, 1955
- Characidium serrano Buckup & R. E. dos Reis 1997
- Characidium steindachneri Cope, 1878
- Characidium sterbai (Zarske, 1997)
- Characidium stigmosum Melo & Buckup, 2002
- Characidium summum Zanata & Ohara, 2015
- Characidium tapuia Zanata, Ramos & Oliveira-Silva, 2018
- Characidium tatama Agudelo-Zamora, Tavera, Murillo & Ortega-Lara, 2020
- Characidium tenue (Cope, 1894)
- Characidium timbuiense Travassos, 1946
- Characidium travassosi Melo, Buckup & Oyakawa, 2016
- Characidium varii Zanata, Oliveira & Oliveira-Silva, 2024
- Characidium vestigipinne Buckup & Hahn, 2000
- Characidium vidali Travassos, 1967
- Characidium wangyapoik Armbruster, Lujan & Bloom, 2021
- Characidium xanthopterum Silveira, Langeani, da Graça, Pavanelli & Buckup, 2008
- Characidium xavante da Graça, Pavanelli & Buckup, 2008
- Characidium zebra Eigenmann, 1909
- Characidium ortegai Oliveira-Silva, 2026
