= Decline in amphibian populations =

Ongoing mass extinction of amphibian species worldwide

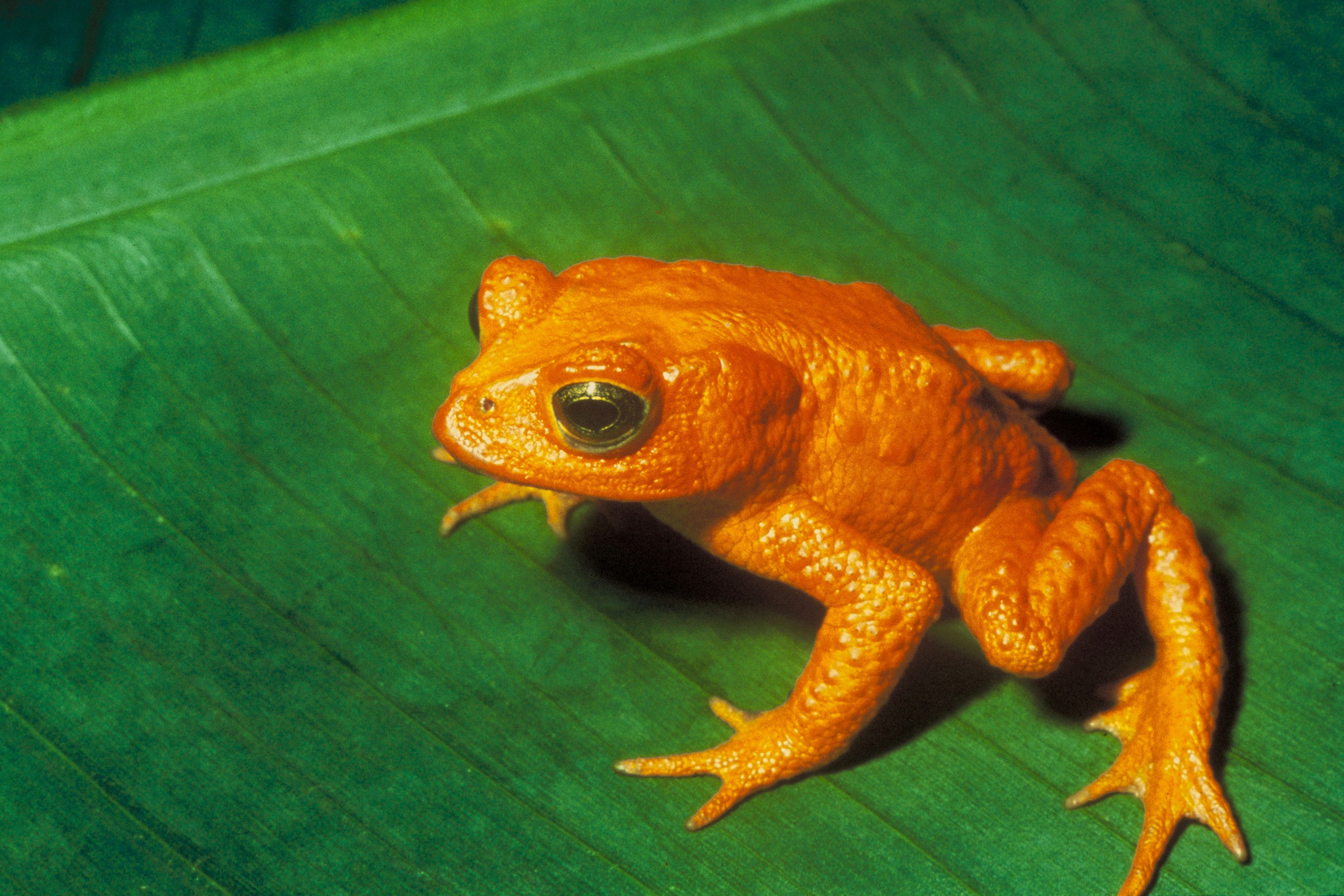
The golden toad of Monteverde, Costa Rica, was among the first casualties of amphibian declines. Formerly abundant, it was last seen in 1989.

Since the 1980s, decreases in amphibian populations, including population decline and localized mass extinctions, have been observed in locations all over the world. This type of biodiversity loss is known as one of the most critical threats to global biodiversity. The possible causes include habitat destruction and modification, diseases, exploitation, pollution, pesticide use, introduced species, and ultraviolet-B radiation (UV-B). However, many of the causes of amphibian declines are still poorly understood, and the topic is currently a subject of ongoing research.

Modeling results found that the current extinction rate of amphibians could be 211 times greater than the background extinction rate. This estimate even goes up to 25,000–45,000 times if endangered species are also included in the computation.

Scientists began observing reduced populations of several European amphibian species already in the 1950s. Nevertheless, awareness of the phenomenon as a global problem and its subsequent classification as a modern-day mass extinction only dates from the 1980s.

== Observations ==
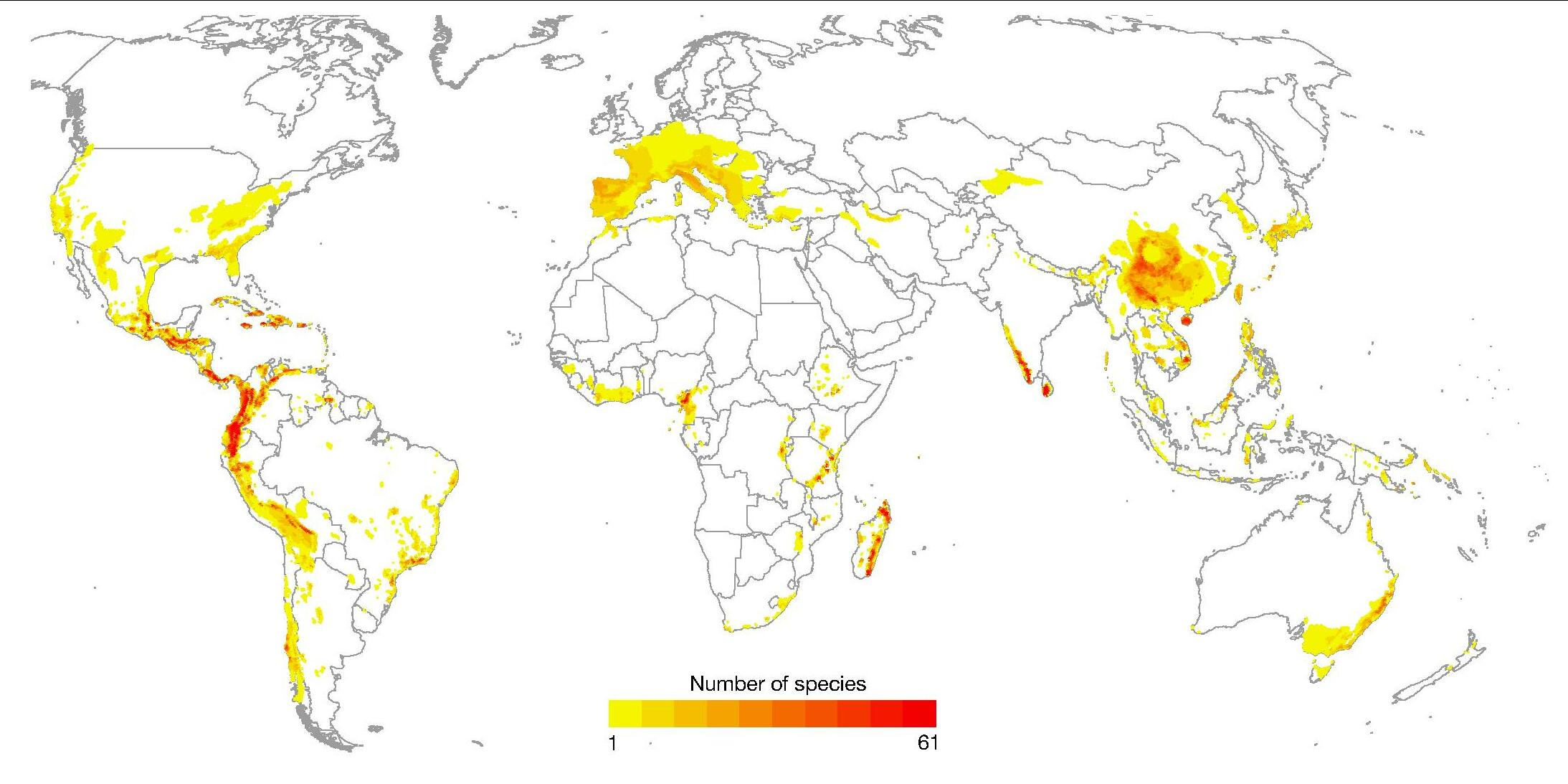
The distribution of 2,873 globally threatened amphibian species.

In the past three decades, declines in populations of amphibians (the class of organisms that includes frogs, toads, salamanders, newts, and caecilians) have occurred worldwide. In 2004, the results were published of the first worldwide assessment of amphibian populations, the Global Amphibian Assessment. This found that 32% of species were globally threatened, at least 43% were experiencing some form of population decrease, and that between 9 and 122 species have become extinct since 1980. As of 2010, the IUCN Red List, which incorporates the Global Amphibian Assessment and subsequent updates, lists 650 amphibian species as "Critically Endangered", and 35 as "Extinct".

Declines in amphibian populations were first widely recognized in the late 1980s, when a large gathering of herpetologists reported noticing declines in populations in amphibians across the globe. Among these species, the golden toad (Bufo periglenes) endemic to Monteverde, Costa Rica, featured prominently. It was the subject of scientific research until populations suddenly crashed in 1987 and it had disappeared completely by 1989. Other species at Monteverde, including the Monteverde harlequin frog (Atelopus varius), also disappeared at the same time. Because these species were located in the pristine Monteverde Cloud Forest Reserve, and these extinctions could not be related to local human activities, they raised particular concern among biologists.

Many scientists believe that amphibians serve as "canaries in a coal mine", and that declines in amphibian populations and species indicate that other groups of animals and plants will soon be at risk.

=== Initial skepticism ===
When amphibian declines were first presented as a conservation issue in the late 1980s, some scientists remained unconvinced of the reality and gravity of the conservation issue. Some biologists argued that populations of most organisms, amphibians included, naturally vary through time. They argued that the lack of long-term data on amphibian populations made it difficult to determine whether the anecdotal declines reported by biologists were worth the (often limited) time and money of conservation efforts.

However, since this initial skepticism, biologists have come to a consensus that declines in amphibian populations are a real and severe threat to biodiversity. This consensus emerged with an increase in the number of studies that monitored amphibian populations, direct observation of mass mortality in pristine sites that lacked apparent cause, and an awareness that declines in amphibian populations are truly global in nature.

== Causes ==
Habitat loss, disease and climate change are thought to be responsible for the drastic decline in populations in recent years.

Declines have been particularly intense in the western United States, Central America, South America, eastern Australia and Fiji (although cases of amphibian extinctions have appeared worldwide). While human activities are causing a loss of much of the world's biodiversity, amphibians appear to be suffering much greater effects than other classes of organism. Because amphibians generally have a two-staged life cycle consisting of both aquatic (larvae) and terrestrial (adult) phases, they are sensitive to both terrestrial and aquatic environmental effects. Because their skins are highly permeable, they may be more susceptible to toxins in the environment than other organisms such as birds or mammals.

Numerous potential explanations for amphibian declines have been proposed. Most or all of these causes have been associated with some population declines, so each cause is likely to affect in certain circumstances but not others. Many of the causes of amphibian declines are well understood, and appear to affect other groups of organisms as well as amphibians. These causes include habitat modification and fragmentation, introduced predators or competitors, introduced species, pollution, pesticide use, or over-harvesting. However, many amphibian declines or extinctions have occurred in pristine habitats where the above effects are not likely to occur. The causes of these declines are complex, but many can be attributed to emerging diseases, climate change, increased ultraviolet-B radiation, or long-distance transmission of chemical contaminants by wind.

Artificial lighting has been suggested as another potential cause. Insects are attracted to lights making them scarcer within the amphibian habitats.

=== Habitat modification ===
Habitat modification or destruction is one of the most dramatic issues affecting amphibian species worldwide. As amphibians generally need aquatic and terrestrial habitats to survive, threats to either habitat can affect populations. Hence, amphibians may be more vulnerable to habitat modification than organisms that only require one habitat type. Large scale climate changes may further be modifying aquatic habitats, preventing amphibians from spawning altogether.

=== Habitat fragmentation ===
Habitat fragmentation occurs when habitats are isolated by habitat modification, such as when a small area of forest is completely surrounded by agricultural fields. Small populations that survive within such fragments are often susceptible to inbreeding, genetic drift, or extinction due to small fluctuations in the environment.

=== Disease ===
Research from 2007 and 2018 indicated that the reemergence of varieties of chytrid fungi may account for a substantial fraction of the overall decline.

A number of diseases have been related to mass die-offs or declines in populations of amphibians, including "red-leg" disease (Aeromonas hydrophila), Ranavirus (family Iridoviridae), Anuraperkinsus, and chytridiomycosis. It is not entirely clear why these diseases have suddenly begun to affect amphibian populations, but some evidence suggests that these diseases may have been spread by humans, or may be more virulent when combined with other environmental factors.

==== Trematodes ====
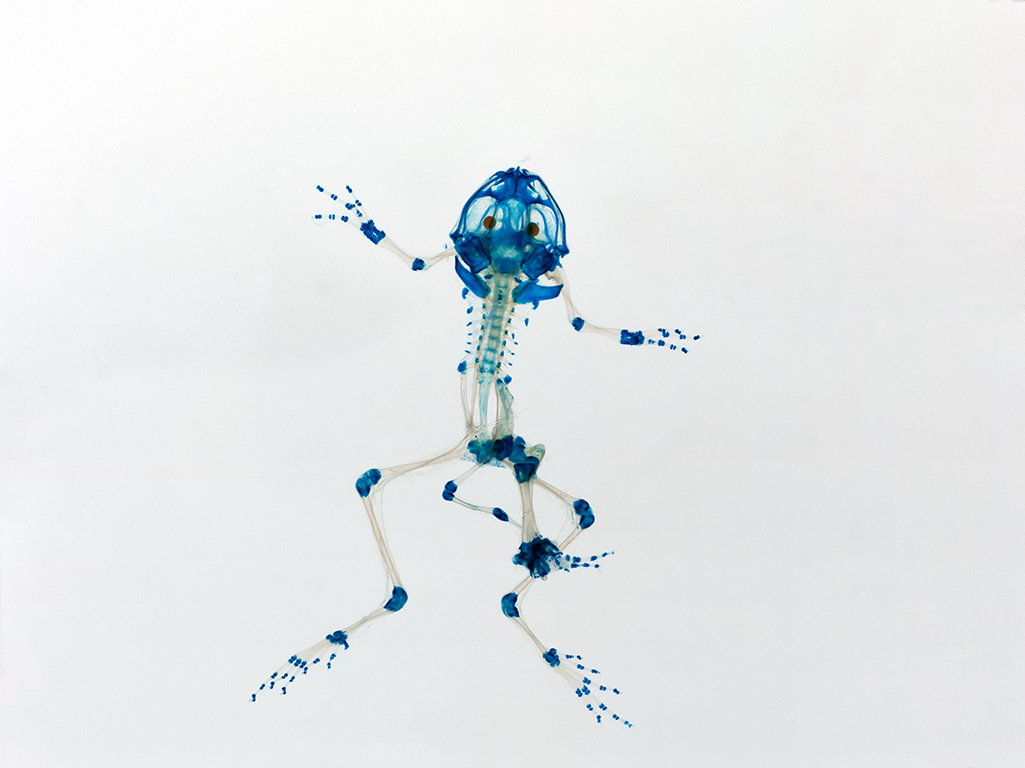
Trematode cyst-infected Pacific tree frog (Hyla regilla) with supernumerary limbs, from La Pine, Deschutes County, Oregon, 1998–9. This 'category I' deformity (polymelia) is believed to be caused by the trematode cyst infection. The cartilage is stained blue and calcified bones in red.

There is considerable evidence that parasitic trematode platyhelminths (a type of fluke) have contributed to developmental abnormalities and population declines of amphibians in some regions. These trematodes of the genus Ribeiroia have a complex life cycle with three host species. The first host includes a number of species of aquatic snails. The early larval stages of the trematodes then are transmitted into aquatic tadpoles, where the metacercariae (larvae) encyst in developing limb buds. These encysted life stages produce developmental abnormalities in post-metamorphic frogs, including additional or missing limbs. These abnormalities increase frog predation by aquatic birds, the final host of the trematode.

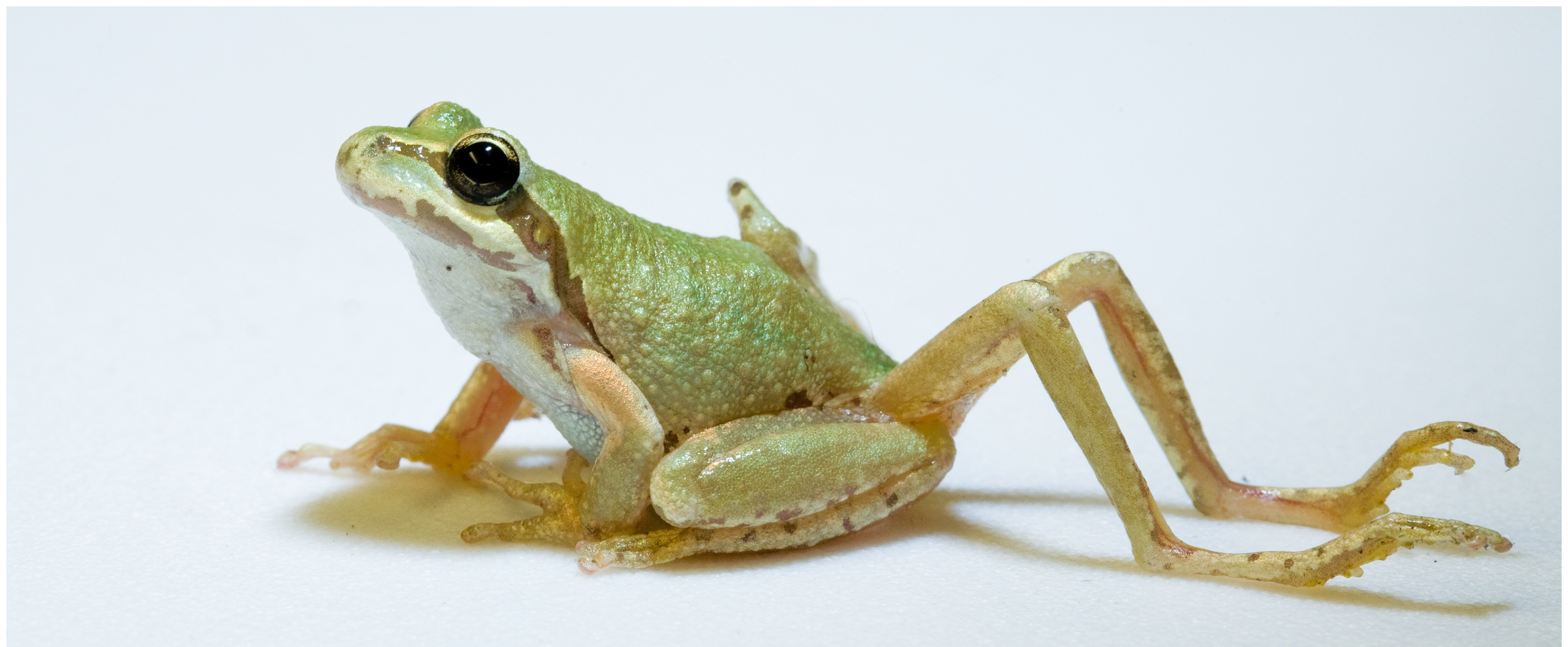
Pacific tree frog with limb malformation induced by Ribeiroia ondatrae

A study showed that high levels of nutrients used in farming and ranching activities fuel parasite infections that have caused frog deformities in ponds and lakes across North America. The study showed increased levels of nitrogen and phosphorus cause sharp hikes in the abundance of trematodes, and that the parasites subsequently form cysts in the developing limbs of tadpoles causing missing limbs, extra limbs and other severe malformations including five or six extra or even no limbs.

=== Pollution and chemical contaminants ===
There is evidence of chemical pollutants causing frog developmental deformities (extra limbs, or malformed eyes). Pollutants have varying effects on frogs. Some alter the central nervous system; others cause a disruption in the production and secretion of hormones. Experimental studies have also shown that exposure to commonly used herbicides such as glyphosate (Tradename Roundup) or insecticides such as malathion or carbaryl greatly increase mortality of tadpoles. Additional studies have indicated that terrestrial adult stages of amphibians are also susceptible to non-active ingredients in Roundup, particularly POEA, which is a surfactant. Although sex reversal in some species of frogs occur naturally in pristine environments, certain estrogen-like pollutants can forcibly induce these changes. In a study conducted in a laboratory at Uppsala University in Sweden, more than 50% of frogs exposed to levels of estrogen-like pollutants existing in natural bodies of water in Europe and the United States became females. Tadpoles exposed even to the weakest concentration of estrogen were twice as likely to become females while almost all of the control group given the heaviest dose became female.

While most pesticide effects are likely to be local and restricted to areas near agriculture, there is evidence from the Sierra Nevada mountains of the western United States that pesticides are traveling long distances into pristine areas, including Yosemite National Park in California.

Some recent evidence points to ozone as a possible contributing factor to the worldwide decline of amphibians.

=== Ozone depletion, ultraviolet radiation and cloud cover ===
Like many other organisms, increasing ultraviolet-B (UVB) radiation due to stratospheric ozone depletion and other factors may harm the DNA of amphibians, particularly their eggs. The amount of damage depends upon the life stage, the species type and other environmental parameters. Salamanders and frogs that produce less photolyase, an enzyme that counteracts DNA damage from UVB, are more susceptible to the effects of loss of the ozone layer. Exposure to ultraviolet radiation may not kill a particular species or life stage but may cause sublethal damage.

More than three dozen species of amphibians have been studied, with severe effects reported in more than 40 publications in peer-reviewed journals representing authors from North America, Europe and Australia. Experimental enclosure approaches to determine UVB effects on egg stages have been criticized; for example, egg masses were placed at water depths much shallower than is typical for natural oviposition sites. While UVB radiation is an important stressor for amphibians, its effect on the egg stage may have been overstated.

Anthropogenic climate change has likely exerted a major effect on amphibian declines. For example, in the Monteverde Cloud Forest, a series of unusually warm years led to the mass disappearances of the Monteverde Harlequin frog and the Golden Toad. An increased level of cloud cover, a result of geoengineering and global warming, which has warmed the nights and cooled daytime temperatures, has been blamed for facilitating the growth and proliferation of the fungus Batrachochytrium dendrobatidis (the causative agent of the fungal infection chytridiomycosis).

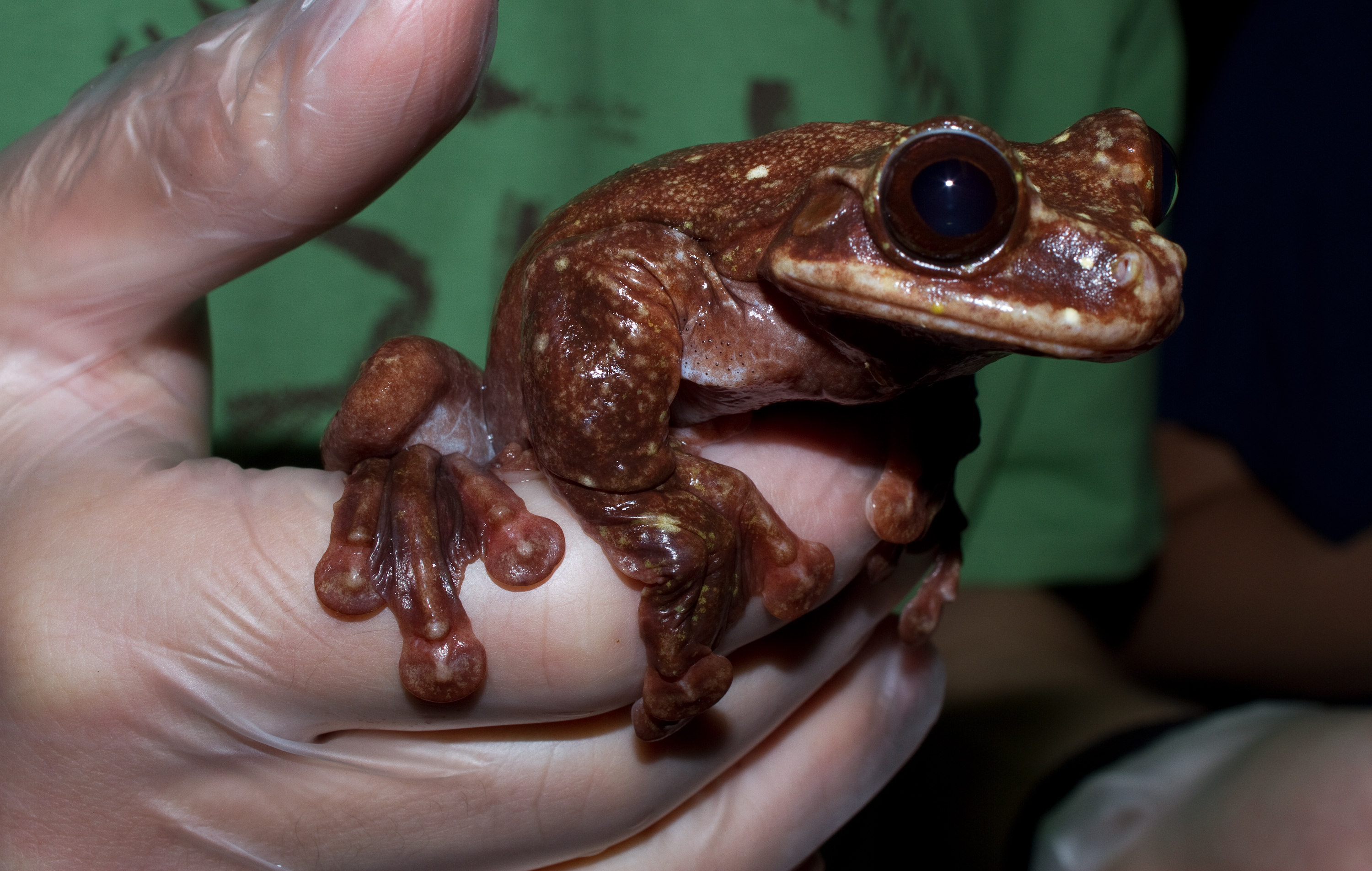
An adult male Ecnomiohyla rabborum in the Atlanta Botanical Garden, a species ravaged by Batrachochytrium dendrobatidis in its native habitat. It was the last known surviving member of its species, and with its death on Sept 28, 2016, the species is believed to be extinct.

Although the immediate cause of the die offs was the chytrid, climate change played a pivotal role in the extinctions. Researchers included this subtle connection in their inclusive climate-linked epidemic hypothesis, which acknowledged climatic change as a key factor in amphibian extinctions both in Costa Rica and elsewhere.

New evidence has shown global warming to also be capable of directly degrading toads' body condition and survivorship. Additionally, the phenomenon often colludes with landscape alteration, pollution, and species invasions to effect amphibian extinctions.

=== Introduced predators ===
Non-native predators and competitors have also been found to affect the viability of frogs in their habitats. The mountain yellow-legged frog which typically inhabits the Sierra Nevada lakes have seen a decline in numbers due to stocking of non-native fish (trout) for recreational fishing. The developing tadpoles and froglets fall prey to the fish in large numbers. This interference in the frog's three-year metamorphosis is causing a decline that is manifest throughout their ecosystem.

=== Increased noise levels ===
Frogs and toads are highly vocal, and their reproductive behaviour often involves the use of vocalizations. There have been suggestions that increased noise levels caused by human activities may be contributing to their declines. In a study in Thailand, increased ambient noise levels were shown to decrease calling in some species and to cause an increase in others. This has, however, not been shown to be a cause for the widespread decline.

== Symptoms of stressed populations ==
Amphibian populations in the beginning stages of decline often exhibit a number of signs, which may potentially be used to identify at-risk segments in conservation efforts. One such sign is developmental instability, which has been proven as evidence of environmental stress. This environmental stress can potentially raise susceptibility to diseases such as chytridiomycosis, and thus lead to amphibian declines. In a study conducted in Queensland, Australia, for example, populations of two amphibian species, Litoria nannotis and Litoria genimaculata, were found to exhibit far greater levels of limb asymmetry in pre-decline years than in control years, the latter of which preceded die offs by an average of 16 years. Learning to identify such signals in the critical period before population declines occur might greatly improve conservation efforts.

== Conservation measures ==
The first response to reports of declining amphibian populations was the formation of the Declining Amphibian Population Task Force (DAPTF) in 1990. DAPTF led efforts for increased amphibian population monitoring in order to establish the extent of the problem, and established working groups to look at different issues. Results were communicated through the newsletter Froglog.

Much of this research went into the production of the first Global Amphibian Assessment (GAA), which was published in 2004 and assessed every known amphibian species against the IUCN Red List criteria. This found that approximately one third of amphibian species were threatened with extinction. As a result of these shocking findings an Amphibian Conservation Summit was held in 2005, because it was considered "morally irresponsible to document amphibian declines and extinctions without also designing and promoting a response to this global crisis".

Outputs from the Amphibian Conservation Summit included the first Amphibian Conservation Action Plan (ACAP) and to merge the DAPTF and the Global Amphibian Specialist Group into the IUCN SSC Amphibian Specialist Group (ASG). The ACAP established the elements required to respond to the crisis, including priority actions on a variety of thematic areas. The ASG is a global volunteer network of dedicated experts who work to provide the scientific foundation for effective amphibian conservation action around the world.

The ACAP (Gascon et al 2007), concerned that time and capability were short, recommended that all relevant species be immediately incorporated into ex situ breeding programs. On 16 February 2007, scientists worldwide met in Atlanta, U.S., to form a group called the Amphibian Ark to help save more than 6,000 species of amphibians from disappearing by starting captive breeding programmes. Overall between the call to action in 2007 and 2019 there has been a 57% increase in number of breeding programs, or 77 additional species.

Areas with noticed frog extinctions, like Australia, have few policies that have been created to prevent the extinction of these species. However, local initiatives have been placed where conscious efforts to decrease global warming will also turn into a conscious effort towards saving the frogs. In South America, where there is also an increased decline of amphibian populations, there is no set policy to try to save frogs. Some suggestions would include getting entire governments to place a set of rules and institutions as a source of guidelines that local governments have to abide by.

A critical issue is how to design protected areas for amphibians which will provide suitable conditions for their survival. Conservation efforts through the use of protected areas have shown to generally be a temporary solution to population decline and extinction because the amphibians become inbred. It is crucial for most amphibians to maintain a high level of genetic variation through large and more diverse environments.

Education of local people to protect amphibians is crucial, along with legislation for local protection and limiting the use of toxic chemicals, including some fertilizers and pesticides in sensitive amphibian areas.

== See also ==
- Effects of pesticides on amphibians
- Holocene extinction
- Colony collapse disorder
- Decline in insect populations
- White nose syndrome
- The Sixth Extinction (book)
- Racing Extinction (film)
