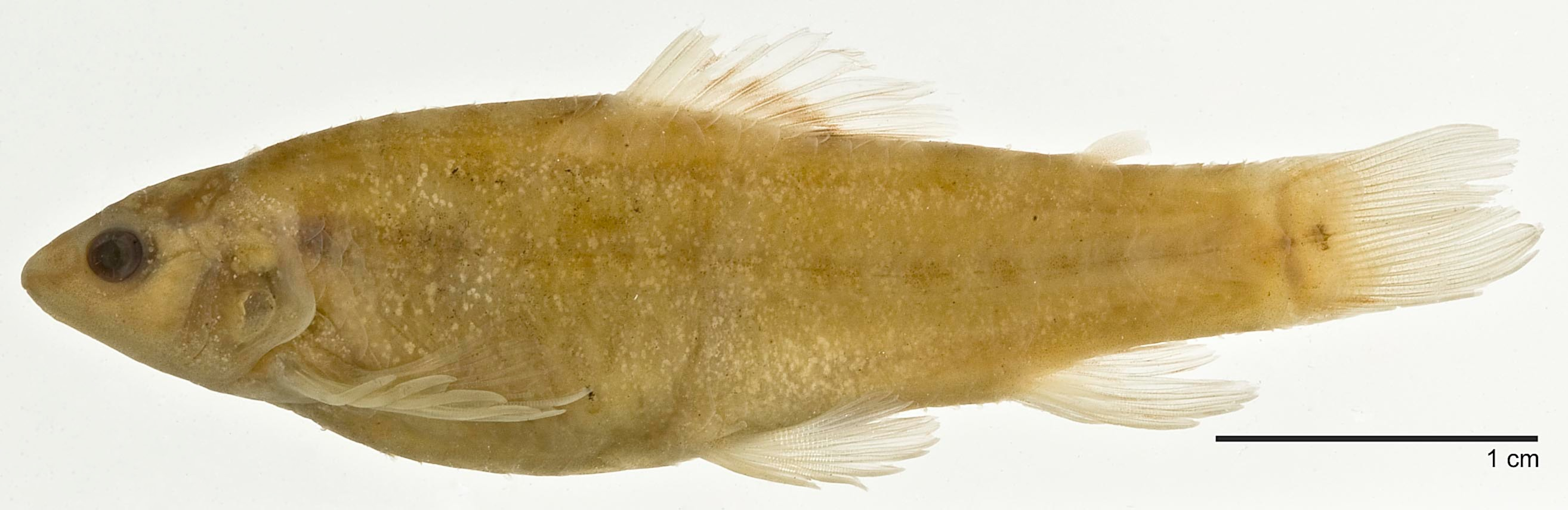
- preserved specimen

Conservation status
- Least Concern (IUCN 3.1)

Scientific classification
- Kingdom: Animalia
- Phylum: Chordata
- Class: Actinopterygii
- Order: Characiformes
- Family: Crenuchidae
- Genus: Characidium
- Species: C. boavistae

Binomial name
- Characidium boavistae Steindachner, 1915

Synonyms
- Characidium fasciatum var. boavistae Steindachner, 1915; Characidium voladorita Schultz, 1944

= Characidium boavistae =

Species of fish

Characidium boavistae is a fish in the family Crenuchidae. It is native to South America and is found in the tributaries of Lake Maracaibo, the Orinoco River basin and the northern tributaries of the Amazon basin.

== Size ==
This species reaches a length of 5.3 cm (2.1 in).

== Etymology ==
The fishes specific name, boavistae, means of Boa Vista, capital of Brazilian state of Roraima, on western bank of Rio Branco, the type locality of the holotype.
