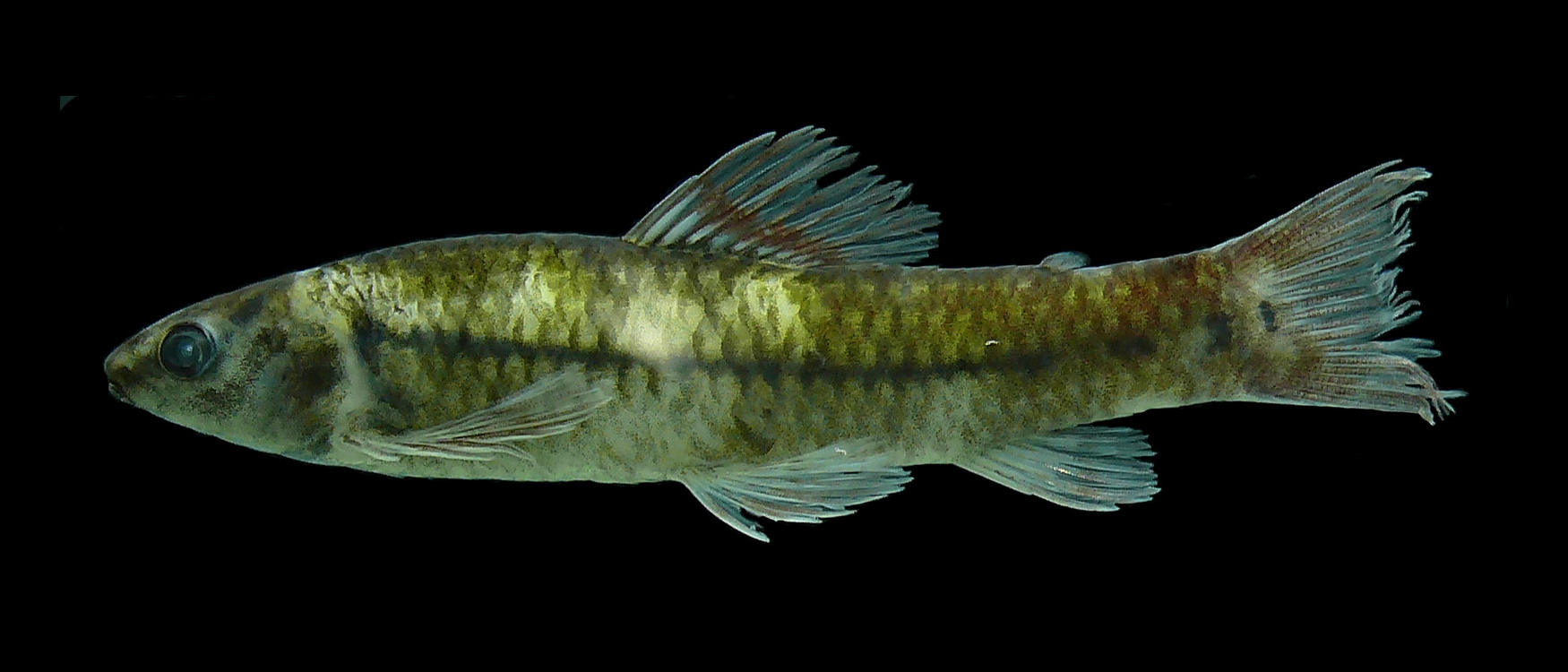

Conservation status
- Least Concern (IUCN 3.1)

Scientific classification
- Kingdom: Animalia
- Phylum: Chordata
- Class: Actinopterygii
- Order: Characiformes
- Family: Crenuchidae
- Genus: Characidium
- Species: C. purpuratum

Binomial name
- Characidium purpuratum Steindachner, 1882

= Characidium purpuratum =

Species of fish

Characidium purpuratum is a fish in the family Crenuchidae. It is native to South America and is found in the Amazon River basin at Andean tributaries to the margin of the Amazon River in Ecuador.

== Size ==
This species reaches a length of 5.3 cm (2.1 in).

== Etymology ==
Characidium purpuratum has the specific name purpuratum, Latin for purple, because Steindachner described it as being "clad in purple", a reference to the purple colour of the caudal fin and anal fin.
