= Skiotocharax =

Conservation status
- Vulnerable (IUCN 3.1)

Scientific classification
- Kingdom: Animalia
- Phylum: Chordata
- Class: Actinopterygii
- Order: Characiformes
- Family: Crenuchidae
- Subfamily: Characidiinae
- Genus: Skiotocharax; Presswell, S. H. Weitzman & Bergquist, 2000
- Species: S. meizon

Binomial name
- Skiotocharax meizon Presswell, S. H. Weitzman & Bergquist, 2000

Species of fish

Skiotocharax is a monospecific genus of freshwater ray-finned fish belonging to the family Crenuchidae, the South American darters. The only species in this genus is Skiotocharax meizon, a species endemic to Guyana where it is found in the basins of the Mazaruni and Berbice Rivers.
