= Characidium hasemani =

Conservation status
- Least Concern (IUCN 3.1)

Scientific classification
- Kingdom: Animalia
- Phylum: Chordata
- Class: Actinopterygii
- Order: Characiformes
- Family: Crenuchidae
- Genus: Characidium
- Species: C. hasemani

Binomial name
- Characidium hasemani Steindachner, 1915

Species of fish

Characidium hasemani is a species of freshwater ray-finned fish belonging to the family Crenuchidae, the South American darters. This species is found in the Amazon and Essequibo river systems in Brazil and Guyana, it also occurs in the Orinoco but its occurrencein this system has yet to be formally documented.

== Size ==
This species reaches a length of 6.8 cm (2.7 in).

== Etymology ==
Characidium hasemani has the specific name hasemani and this honors the American zoologist, and collector of specimens for the Carnegie Museum of Natural History, John D. Haseman, the collector the holotype.
