= Odontocharacidium =

Scientific classification
- Kingdom: Animalia
- Phylum: Chordata
- Class: Actinopterygii
- Order: Characiformes
- Family: Crenuchidae
- Subfamily: Characidiinae
- Genus: Odontocharacidium; Buckup, 1993

Type species
- Klausewitzia aphanes Weitzman & Kanazawa, 1977

Genus of fishes

Odontocharacidium is a genus of freshwater ray-finned fishes belonging to the family Crenuchidae, the South American darters. The fishes in this genus are small fishes, with a maximum total length of 2 cm (0.79 in), found in South America.

== Species ==
Odontocharacidium contains the following valid species:

- Odontocharacidium aphanes (Weitzman & Kanazawa, 1977) (Green dwarf tetra)
- Odontocharacidium varii Queiroz Rodrigues & Netto-Ferreira, 2020
