= Elachocharax =

Scientific classification
- Kingdom: Animalia
- Phylum: Chordata
- Class: Actinopterygii
- Order: Characiformes
- Family: Crenuchidae
- Subfamily: Characidiinae
- Genus: Elachocharax; Myers, 1927

Type species
- Elachocharax pulcher Myers, 1927

Synonyms
- Geisleria Géry, 1971

Genus of fishes

Elachocharax is a genus of small freshwater ray-finned fish belonging to the family Crenuchidae, the South American darters. They are native to the Amazon and Orinoco basins in South America.

== Species ==
Elachocharax contains the following species:

- Elachocharax geryi Weitzman & Kanazawa, 1978
- Elachocharax junki (Géry, 1971)
- Elachocharax mitopterus Weitzman, 1986
- Elachocharax pulcher Myers, 1927
