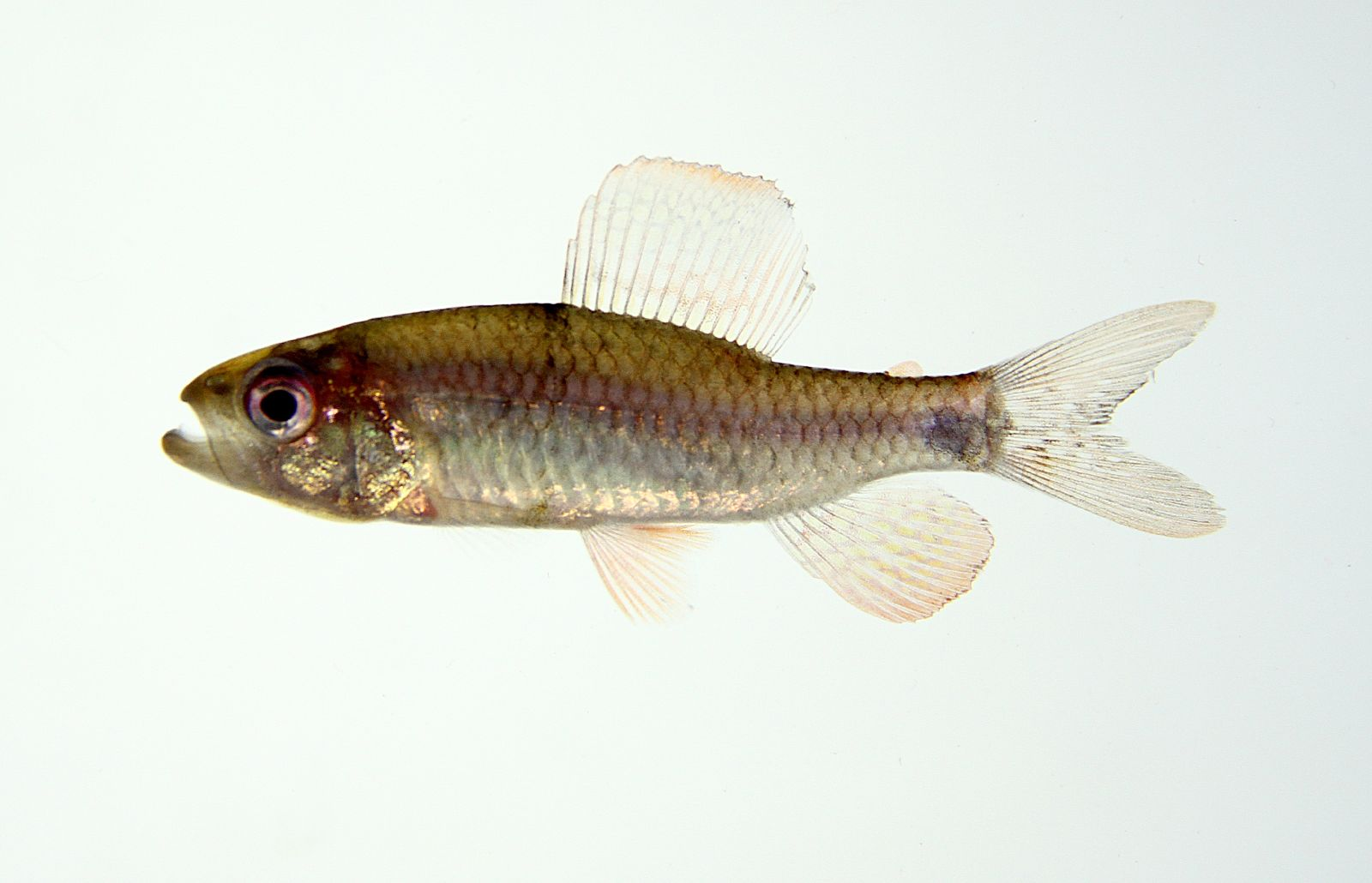

Conservation status
- Least Concern (IUCN 3.1)

Scientific classification
- Kingdom: Animalia
- Phylum: Chordata
- Class: Actinopterygii
- Division: Teleostei
- Order: Characiformes
- Family: Crenuchidae
- Subfamily: Crenuchinae
- Genus: Crenuchus; Günther, 1863
- Species: C. spilurus

Binomial name
- Crenuchus spilurus Günther, 1863

= Sailfin tetra =

Species of fish

The sailfin tetra (Crenuchus spilurus), also known as the mojarita, is a species belonging to the South American darter family, Crenuchidae. It is found in the Amazon and Orinoco Basins, as well as various river Basins in the Guianas. It is the only member of the monospecific genus, Crenuchus, one of two genera within the subfamily Crenuchinae.

== Taxonomy ==
The sailfin tetra was first formally described in 1863 by the German-born British ichthyologist Albert Günther with its type locality given as the Essequibo River in Guyana. When he described this species, Günther proposed the new monospecific genus Crenuchus. This taxon is classified within the subfamily Crenuchinae of the family Crenuchidae in the suborder Characoidei of the order Characiformes, the characins and related fishes.

== Etymology ==
The sailfin tetra is the only species in the genus Crenuchus, this name is a combination of crena, a Latin word meaning "notch", and nucha, Medieval Latin for the nape. Günther did not explain why he chose this name, nor is it obvious, although it may be an allusion to the slight indentation on the nape developed by breeding males. The specific name spilurus is a compound of the Greek spilos, which means "mark" or "spot", and oura, meaning tail, a referenceto the circular black spot on the distal end of the caudal peduncle.

== Distribution and habitat ==
The sailfin tetra has a wide distribution in northern South America in the catchments of the Orinoco and Amazon Rivers in Brazil, Colombia. Ecuador. Peru and Venezuela, as well as in the coastal rivers of Guyana, Suriname and French Guiana. It occurs in small streams with a slow current and in intermittent pools along the sides of streams. This species is found in environments with complex structures, frequently being found in assoaciation with leaf litter.

== Ecology and behavior ==
The sailfin tetra, as a tiny species, is unlikely to participate in active dispersal across long distances. This is clear from its absence in the main channel of huge rivers. Active migration in open areas, particularly in a predator-rich environment like the Amazon basin, presents unique obstacles for small, non-schooling fish. The species makes specific use of the rhythmic oscillations of the dorsal fin to control its movements precisely, stressing its close relationship with complex structures. Unlike most members of the Characiformes group, the sailfin tetra does not swim much and prefers to stay near stream margin structures. As a hard substrate spawner with larvae that sink to the substrate, passive larval dispersal is reduced, implying a preference for philopatry. This behavior stands in stark contrast to the majority of the order's species, which are either spread spawners or have minimal site selection for spawning.

== Utilization ==
The sailfin tetra is found in the aquarium trade, but the collection of specimens from the wild is not thought to be a threat to the populations of this species.
