= Klausewitzia =

Conservation status
- Least Concern (IUCN 3.1)

Scientific classification
- Kingdom: Animalia
- Phylum: Chordata
- Class: Actinopterygii
- Order: Characiformes
- Family: Crenuchidae
- Subfamily: Characidiinae
- Genus: Klausewitzia; Géry, 1965
- Species: K. ritae

Binomial name
- Klausewitzia ritae Géry, 1965

Species of fish

Klausewitzia is a monospecific genus of freshwater ray-finned fish belonging to the family Crenuchidae, the South American darters. The only species in this genus is Klausewitzia ritae, a fish found in the upper Amazon basin near the border of Brazil and Peru.

The fish was described in 1965 and is named in honor of Rita Klausewitz (d. 1995), the wife of ichthyologist Wolfgang Klausewitz.
