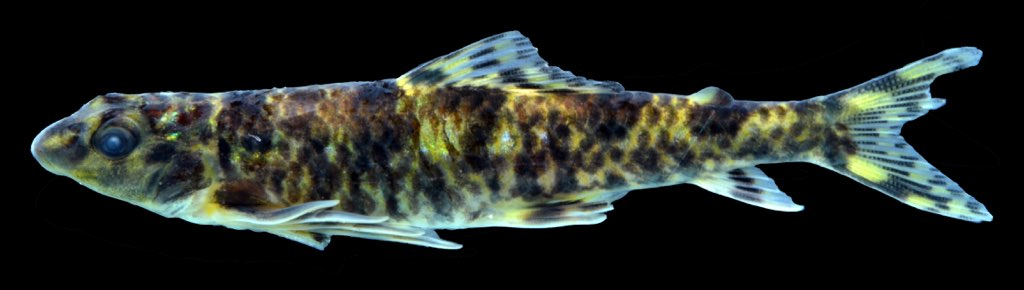
- Melanocharacidium pectorale

Scientific classification
- Kingdom: Animalia
- Phylum: Chordata
- Class: Actinopterygii
- Order: Characiformes
- Family: Crenuchidae
- Subfamily: Characidiinae
- Genus: Melanocharacidium; Buckup, 1993

Type species
- Characidium blennioides C. H. Eigenmann, 1909

= Melanocharacidium =

Genus of fishes

Melanocharacidium is a genus of freshwater ray-finned fishes belonging to the family Crenuchidae, the South American darters. They are found in the Amazon, Orinoco and Araguaia basins, as well as river basins of the Guianas. They are small fish, up to around 10 cm (4 in) in standard length.

== Species ==
Melanocharacidium contains the following valid species:

- Melanocharacidium auroradiatum Costa & Vicente, 1994
- Melanocharacidium blennioides (C. H. Eigenmann, 1909)
- Melanocharacidium compressum Buckup, 1993
- Melanocharacidium depressum Buckup, 1993
- Melanocharacidium dispilomma Buckup, 1993
- Melanocharacidium melanopteron Buckup, 1993
- Melanocharacidium nigrum Buckup, 1993
- Melanocharacidium pectorale Buckup, 1993
- Melanocharacidium rex (Böhlke, 1958)
