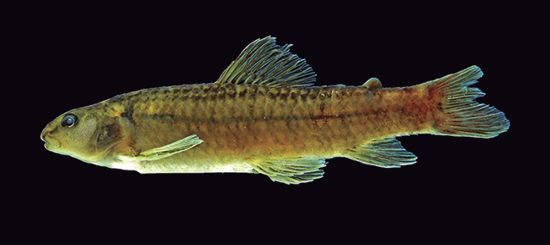
- Characidium fasciatum

Scientific classification
- Kingdom: Animalia
- Phylum: Chordata
- Class: Actinopterygii
- Order: Characiformes
- Family: Crenuchidae
- Subfamily: Characidiinae; Fowler, 1932

= Characidiinae =

Subfamily of fishes

Characidiinae is a subfamily of freshwater ray-fnned fishes, one of two subfamilies belonging to the family Crenuchidae, the South American darters. The fishes in this subfamily are found in the Neotropics.

== Genera ==
Characidiinae contains the following genera:

- Ammocryptocharax Weitzman & Kanazawa, 1976
- Characidium Reinhardt, 1867
- Elachocharax Myers, 1927
- Klausewitzia Géry, 1965
- Leptocharacidium Buckup, 1993
- Melanocharacidium Buckup, 1993
- Microcharacidium Buckup, 1993
- Odontocharacidium Buckup, 1993
- Skiotocharax Presswell, Weitzman & Bergquist, 2000
