= Ribeiroia ondatrae =

Scientific classification
- Kingdom: Animalia
- Phylum: Platyhelminthes
- Class: Trematoda
- Order: Plagiorchiida
- Family: Psilostomatidae
- Genus: Ribeiroia
- Species: R. ondatrae

Binomial name
- Ribeiroia ondatrae (Price, 1931)

Synonyms
- Psilostomum ondatrae Price, 1931; Cercaria thomasi McMullen, 1938; Ribeiroia insignis Travassos, 1939; Pseudopsilostoma ondatrae Yamaguti, 1958; Ribeiroia thomasi Yamaguti, 1958

Species of fluke

Ribeiroia ondatrae, or the frog-mutating flatworm is a parasite in the genus Ribeiroia which is believed to be responsible for many of the recent increases in amphibian limb malformations, particularly missing, malformed, and additional hind legs.

It was first reported from livers of Ondatra, hence its specific name. In recent studies, it was found that in areas infected with R. ondatrae, the population of amphibian limb malformations was much higher than populations in which this trematode was not present. Each species studied showed varying results. For example, amphibians of species Pseudacris regilla, Rana aurora and Taricha torosa were found to physically display a higher frequency in the number of abnormalities.

The exact mechanism of deformation has not been determined but it has been theorized that deformation results from mechanical disruption of the cells involved in limb bud formation during the amphibian larval stage.

== Life cycle ==
R. ondatrae is a digenetic trematode that occurs in lentic aquatic environments and has a complex life cycle that requires the infection of three different host species. The life cycle commences once an avian or mammalian host, containing the adult worms, releases eggs contained in feces into lakes, farm ponds, or streams. It takes around 2-3 weeks for the fertilized eggs to develop. The newly hatched miracidia will swim rapidly to search for its primary intermediate host (Planorbella trivolvis).

The first intermediate host is the ram's horn snail. The second intermediate hosts are fish and larval amphibians including frogs and salamanders. For second intermediate hosts, the free-swimming cercariae will begin to locate a suitable area for encystment where cercarial bodies will enclose themselves within cyst walls (metacercariae). These cysts are freed when the definitive host consumes the second intermediate host, and they will begin to migrate up the ileum and attach to the mucosa of the definitive host for sexual maturity. Inside amphibians, cercariae are attracted to limb bud regions where the hind limbs form. As a result, large numbers of metacercariae encyst near the base of the hind legs. The definitive hosts are predators such as hawks, herons, ducks, and badgers.

The abundance of the teratogenic trematode Ribeiroia ondatre has been found to increase in eutrophic (nutrient rich) waters.

== Enhanced transmission ==
An important factor to the R. ondatrae infections is the exposure to run off nutrients, i.e. eutrophication. Fertilizers have phosphates in them which is also a predictor of larval trematode abundance in amphibians. The herbicide atrazine has proven to weaken amphibians' immune systems which causes frogs to become more prone to R. ondatrae infections which in turn causes predators such as birds to attack the multiple or missing limbed frogs. Since herbicides and pesticides affect the prevalence of R. ondatrae in frogs, they tend to increase mortality and pathology due to extra or missing limbs. The birds that eat the crippled amphibians act as a tertiary host in which the flatworm reproduces, and by which it is spread over larger distances.

== Morphology of cercariae (species identification) ==
The cercariae body (tail tip to oral sucker) of R. ondatrae measures to be 800 μm long and 200 μm wide and is truncated posteriorly and tapered anteriorly. Like Trifolium spp., the defining morphological structure of R. ondatrae is the appearance of two laterally projecting esophageal diverticula, which are located halfway along the length of the esophagus. Aside from these features, the cercariae possess a pair of main excretory collecting tubes that emerge from the excretory bladder medially, running laterally and anteriorly. Also, these tubes are filled with large refractive granules (approximately 150). Another feature is the presence of a rose-colored organ or pink colored tissue that resides between the oral sucker and pharynx of freshly shed living specimens. However, this detail should be used cautiously because not all R. ondatrae cercariae have this feature and the color visibility along with intensity can vary.

== Location of infection/possible mechanisms ==
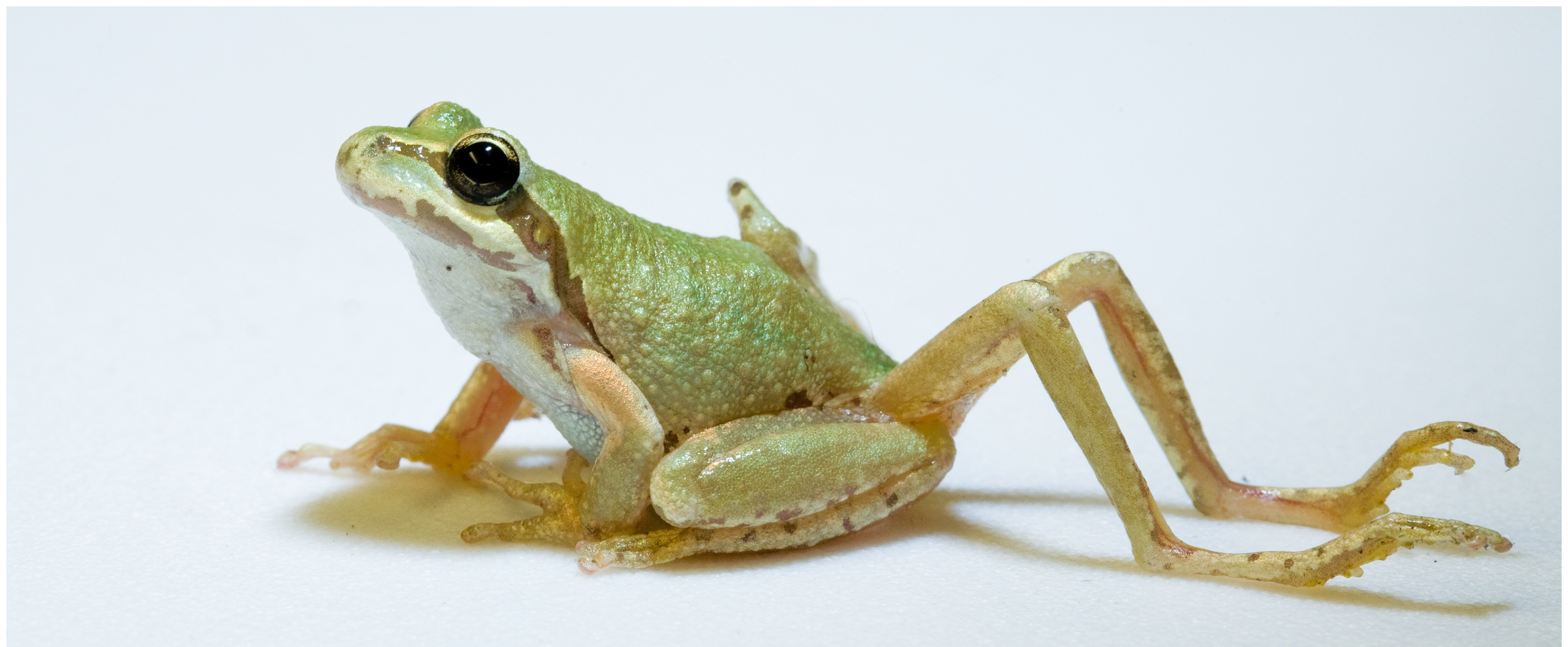
Pacific tree frog with limb malformation induced by R. ondatrae

R. ondatrae's mechanism of causing malformations is still unknown, but there seems to be evidence in which areas of the body it infects more. Studies show that when frogs or toads are affected with R. ondatrae it seems that the most common spot for any deformity is on the hind limbs. These malformations are characterized by the following: skin webbings, missing digits/limbs, cutaneous fusions and bony bridges. The general thought is that it is believed that the forelimb is not as likely to be malformed as the hind limbs, which develop in unceasing proximity to the environment. The amount of exposure to R. ondatrae cercariae appears to determine where a deformity will occur. For instance, a moderate amount of R. ondatrae can affect the forelimbs of amphibians, but a heavy parasite load does not affect the forelimbs and only causes deformities in hind limbs.

There are 2 proposals for the mechanism of how R. ondatrae metacercariae cause malformations. The first explanation for these limb deformities proposes that abnormal cellular outgrowth is caused by mechanical disruption of the spatial organization of cells that stems from metacercariae that encyst within tissues of the developing limb buds. The second proposal for the mechanism that serves as an alternative to the parasite-induced mechanical perturbation is that the malformations are directly caused by the parasite itself. The parasite's production/release of growth factors act as a source of confusion for the molecular signals directing limb development.

== Species infected ==
- Green frog
- Pacific chorus frog
- Northern leopard frog
- Long-toed salamander
- California newt
- Western toad
- Northern red-legged frog
- Columbia spotted frog
- Wood frog
