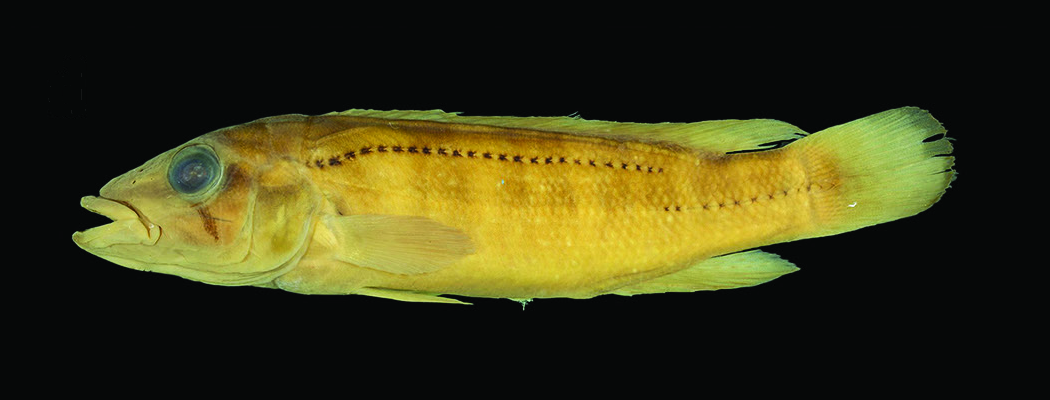

Conservation status
- Least Concern (IUCN 3.1)

Scientific classification
- Kingdom: Animalia
- Phylum: Chordata
- Class: Actinopterygii
- Order: Cichliformes
- Family: Cichlidae
- Genus: Crenicichla
- Species: C. haroldoi

Binomial name
- Crenicichla haroldoi Luengo & Britski, 1974

= Crenicichla haroldoi =

Species of fish

Crenicichla haroldoi is a species of cichlid native to South America. It is found swimming in the upper Paraná River basin, Brazil. This species reaches a length of 9.8 cm (3.9 in).

== Etymology ==
The fish is named in honor of Brazilian ichthyologist Haroldo P. Travassos (1922-1977).
