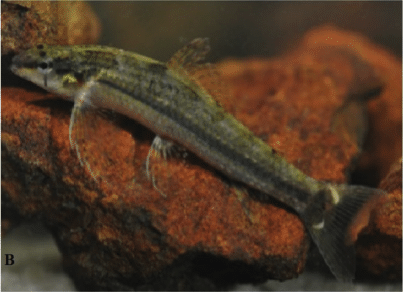

Conservation status
- Least Concern (IUCN 3.1)

Scientific classification
- Kingdom: Animalia
- Phylum: Chordata
- Class: Actinopterygii
- Order: Characiformes
- Family: Crenuchidae
- Subfamily: Characidiinae
- Genus: Leptocharacidium; Buckup, 1993
- Species: L. omospilus

Binomial name
- Leptocharacidium omospilus Buckup, 1993

= Leptocharacidium =

Species of fish

Leptocharacidium is a monospecific genus of freshwater ray-finned fish belonging to the family Crenuchidae, the South American darters. The only species in this genus is Leptocharacidium omospilus, a species of fish in the family Crenuchidae, the South American darters. It is endemic to Venezuela where it is found in the upper Orinoco River system.
