= Microcharacidium =

Scientific classification
- Kingdom: Animalia
- Phylum: Chordata
- Class: Actinopterygii
- Order: Characiformes
- Family: Crenuchidae
- Subfamily: Characidiinae
- Genus: Microcharacidium; Buckup, 1993

Type species
- Jobertina eleotrioides Géry, 1960

Genus of fishes

Microcharacidium is a genus of freshwater ray-finned fishes belonging to the family Crenuchidae, the South American darters. The fishes in this genus are found in South America.

== Species ==
Microcharacidium contains the following valid species:

- Microcharacidium bombioides Vieira & Netto-Ferreira, 2021
- Microcharacidium eleotrioides (Géry, 1960)
- Microcharacidium gnomus Buckup, 1993
- Microcharacidium weitzmani Buckup 1993
