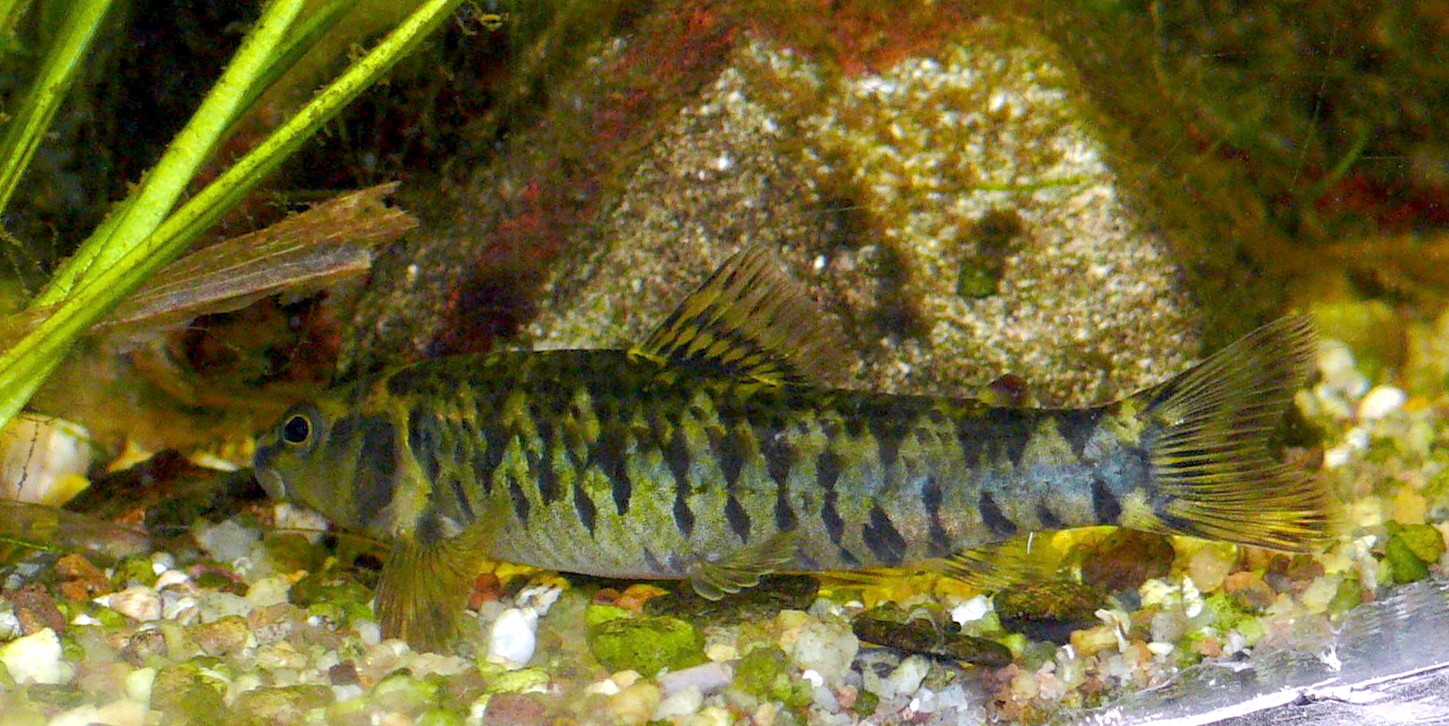

Conservation status
- Data Deficient (IUCN 3.1)

Scientific classification
- Kingdom: Animalia
- Phylum: Chordata
- Class: Actinopterygii
- Order: Characiformes
- Family: Crenuchidae
- Genus: Characidium
- Species: C. fasciatum

Binomial name
- Characidium fasciatum J. T. Reinhardt, 1867

= Characidium fasciatum =

Species of fish

Characidium fasciatum, the darter characin, is a fish in the family Crenuchidae. It is native to South America and is found in the São Francisco and the upper Paraná River drainages in Brazil.

== Size ==
This species reaches a length of 6.9 cm (2.7 in).
