= Ribeiroia =

Scientific classification
- Kingdom: Animalia
- Phylum: Platyhelminthes
- Class: Trematoda
- Order: Plagiorchiida
- Family: Psilostomatidae
- Genus: Ribeiroia; Travassos, 1939

Type species
- Ribeiroia insignis Travassos, 1939 = Ribeiroia ondatrae (Price, 1931)

Species
- Ribeiroia congolensis Ribeiroia marini Ribeiroia ondatrae

Genus of flukes

Ribeiroia (/raɪˈbɪəriːə/) is a genus of trematode parasites that sequentially infect freshwater snails in the family Planorbidae (ramshorn snails) as first intermediate hosts, fish and larval amphibians as second intermediate hosts, and birds and mammals as definitive hosts (see § Life history). In North America, infection by Ribeiroia has been linked to amphibians with limb malformations. The connection between parasitic infection and limb malformations has generated questions about (a) whether parasite-induced malformations in amphibians are increasing (see § Evidence for emergence), and (b) the consequences of such abnormalities for amphibian population conservation (see § Parasite-induced malformations and amphibian conservation).

== Taxonomy ==
Ribeiroia is a genus of parasites in the class Trematoda, phylum Platyhelminthes. Currently three species and one subspecies of Ribeiroia are recognized: R. ondatrae in North America, R. marini in the Caribbean, R. m. guadeloupensis on the Caribbean island of Guadeloupe, and R. congolensis in Africa (Johnson et al. 2004). The trematode Cercaria lileta is also closely related to Ribeiroia, and molecular sequence data indicates that it may be a species of Ribeiroia (Johnson et al. 2004). All species of Ribeiroia share the distinctive morphological characteristic of esophageal diverticula (i.e., two short dead-end branches that extend laterally from the esophagus). Other genera closely related to Ribeiroia include Cladocystis trifolium, Cathemasia, and Echinostoma (Johnson et al. 2004). See Johnson et al. (2004) for more details on morphological and ecological differences as well as phylogenetic relationships between these species.

== Life cycle ==
Ribeiroia ondatrae has an indirect complex life cycle. The adult worms live inside predatory birds or mammals (the definitive hosts), wherein they reproduce sexually if other worms are present. Mature adults release eggs into the host’s intestinal tract, which are passed with the feces of the host, and to develop need to end up in water. The eggs typically develop in 2–3 weeks, but the time varies depending on water temperature. Eggs hatch into miracidia, a ciliated free-living parasite stage, which infect the first intermediate host, ram’s horn snails in the family Planorbidae, colonizing the snail’s reproductive tissue and eventually forming rediae, a slow-moving worm-like parasite stage. The rediae reproduce asexually, castrating the snail as they feed on its reproductive tissue. The infection becomes mature in about six weeks, when the rediae within the snail begin to release a second free-swimming stage called cercariae. The key identifying characteristic of Ribeiroia ondatrae cercariae is the bifurcated esophagus (although this trait can occur in some closely related genera such as Cladocystis trifolium). Cercariae infect amphibians or fish (the second intermediate hosts) wherein they encyst in (with amphibians) the limb buds or (with fish) along the lateral line and scales of the head, body and gills. Encysted cercariae become metacercariae, a dormant parasite stage with a thin outer membrane. Metacercariae resemble cercariae without their tails and do not reproduce. The definitive hosts (birds and mammals) become infected when they consume an amphibian or fish that has encysted metacercariae. The life cycle is completed when the metacercariae emerge from their cyst and attach to the definitive host’s intestinal tract and develop into adults, typically in the proventriculus of birds and the stomach of mammals.

== Infection and amphibian malformations ==
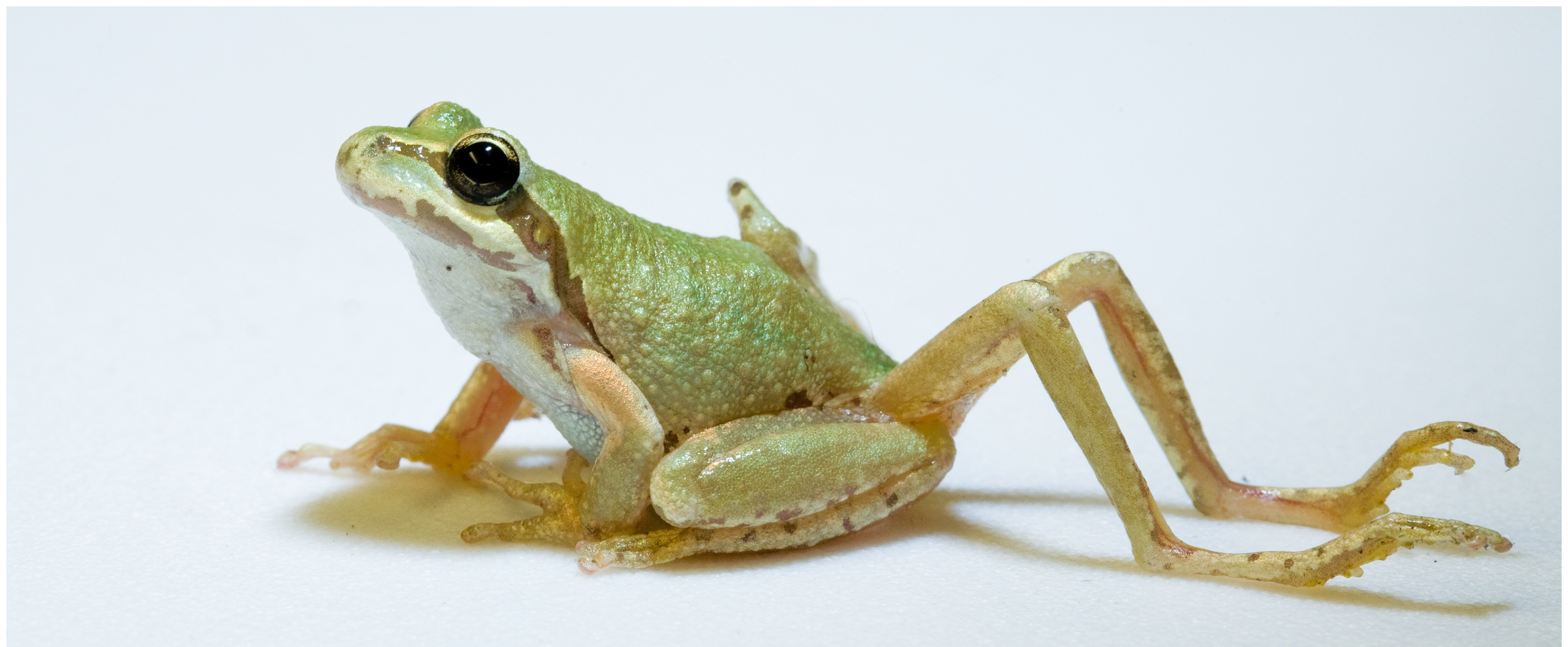
Pacific tree frog with limb malformation induced by Ribeiroia ondatrae

=== Laboratory studies ===
Experimental exposure to Ribeiroia ondatrae cercariae has been shown to cause limb malformations in various frog, toad and salamander species, including Pseudacris regilla, Anaxyrus boreas, Lithobates pipiens, A. americanus, Ambystoma macrodactylum, L. clamitans and L. sylvatica. Cercariae appear to prefer to infect in and around the developing limb buds of larval amphibians, which can alter or inhibit limb development. The risk of malformation and mortality varies as a function of parasite exposure level, host development stage, and the amphibian species involved. As expected for macroparasitic infections, a dose-dependent relationship exists between cercariae exposure and pathology, particularly among larval amphibians at pre- or early-limb development stage. Cercarial penetration of host tissue involves proteolytic enzymes. The exact mechanism which alters limb development is unknown, but potential pathways include mechanical disturbance by invading parasites, release of a teratogenic chemical by parasites, or a combination of the two.

Susceptibility to infection and the subsequent pathology differs among amphibian species. For example, gray tree frogs (Hyla versicolor) are largely resistant to infection, but toads (e.g. A. americanus) exhibit high frequencies of mortality and malformations following parasite exposure (Johnson and Hartson 2009). The types of limb malformations also vary among species and developmental stage of exposure. The most common errors in development associated with Ribeiroia exposure are skin webbings (cutaneous fusion), missing limbs and limb elements (ectromelia and hemimelia), supernumerary limbs and digits (polymelia and polydactyly), and bony triangles. The factors determining variation in susceptibility among species remain poorly understood. However these observations suggest that the type of malformation alone is unlikely to be diagnostic of Ribeiroia exposure.

=== Field studies ===
Ribeiroia infection has been linked to malformations in naturally occurring amphibian populations, especially in the western and midwestern US. In a large-scale study in the western US, both the presence and abundance of Ribeiroia infection predicted higher-than-baseline (e.g. >5%) frequencies of abnormalities in one or more amphibian species. Limb malformations were observed in nine species and ranged in frequency from <5% to nearly 90%. The role of Ribeiroia in explaining accounts of amphibian malformations in other regions is varied; Ribeiroia has been associated with malformation "hotspots" in the midwestern and northeastern US, but it was not detected in malformation surveys from Vermont, Alaska, Bermuda, and Michigan.

== Geographic distribution ==
Ribeiroia ondatrae is widely distributed across the US, including records from 22 species in 37 states (Johnson and McKenzie 2008). Most records of Ribeiroia-associated malformations have been reported from California, Oregon, Washington, Montana, Minnesota, Wisconsin, New Jersey and Pennsylvania. Less is known about the distribution of Ribeiroia in Canada and Central America. In amphibians, both the abundance of the parasite and the number of observations appear to correlate positively with major bird migratory flyways, with concentrations along the Pacific, Mississippi, and Atlantic flyways (Johnson et al. 2010). This observation suggests definitive (bird) host activity is an important determinant of parasite distribution at the continental scale, but this hypothesis has yet to be rigorously tested. Ribeiroia ondatrae is most often recovered from amphibians in lentic habitats, such as ponds, lakes, and wetlands, which support planorbid snails. Other species of Ribeiroia occur in the Caribbean and South America (R. marini and R. marini guadeloupensis) and in Africa (R. congolensis). However, whether these species infect amphibians or cause limb malformations has not been explored.

== Evidence for emergence ==
Dating back over 200 years, there have been reports of amphibian malformations suggesting that the general phenomenon is not a new occurrence in amphibian populations (Ouellet 2000). Despite the historical occurrence of amphibian malformations, the real question is whether such malformations are increasing in prevalence and severity in wild amphibian populations. Limited historical data on malformations and the absence of baseline malformation data has complicated attempts to assess whether malformations are emerging. However, research over the past decade has shown that malformations are emerging in some amphibian populations. For example, the background rate of malformations of northern leopard frogs in Minnesota increased from 0.4% in 1958–1963 to 2.5% in 1996–1997 (Hoppe 2000), with recently observed malformations more severe and more diverse. Similarly, Johnson and Lunde (2005), in a comparison of recent (1990–2000) and historical (1899–1989) publications, found that recent reports document:

1. a wider range of more severe malformations,
2. a greater number of affected amphibian species,
3. a larger number of affected sites, and
4. a higher frequency range of affected individuals at reported sites.

For both of these studies, however, the mechanisms driving the apparent increase in malformations were not identified (see Factors influencing emergence). In a more rigorous study, Johnson et al. (2003) confirmed that historical malformations at six of eight sites (1947–1990) were associated with Ribeiroia infection. Moreover, three of these sites continued to support limb malformations at frequencies of 7-50% in one or more species. One pond in particular (Jette Pond in western Montana) showed increased prevalence of malformations in Pseudacris regilla from 20% in 1960 to 46% in 2000, which was correlated with an increased intensity of Ribeiroia infection. Although more research is necessary, these studies provide evidence that malformations, especially those linked to Ribeiroia infection, are emerging in some amphibian populations.

== Factors influencing infection ==
Nutrients - Nitrogen and phosphorus enrichment are widespread forms of anthropogenic environmental change that may influence parasite infection (Johnson and Carpenter 2008). Nutrient enrichment leads to eutrophication, which has been linked with emergence of Ribeiroia ondatrae through direct and indirect effects on aquatic food webs (Johnson and Chase 2004). The underlying mechanism through which eutrophication can increase infection involves increasing the density of infected first-intermediate snail hosts and by increasing the production of parasites by infected snails (Johnson et al. 2007).

Pesticides - Pesticides are still considered a potential factor influencing amphibian malformations (Johnson et al. 2010). However, recent investigations have focused on the interaction of pesticides with parasite infection (Kiesecker 2002; Rohr et al. 2008). Field experiments indicated a link between agricultural run-off and increased infection (Kiesecker 2002). Laboratory studies further demonstrated that pesticide exposure reduced host immunocompetence against parasites as the biological mechanism (Kiesecker 2002). Furthermore, there may be a link between nutrient addition and pesticide contamination jointly leading to increased infections by simultaneously increasing exposure and suppressing host immune systems (Rohr et al. 2008a, b).

Biodiversity - Host species diversity and community structure have been suggested to influence disease dynamics through a hypothesis termed the ‘dilution effect’ (Ostfeld and Keesing 2000). For Ribeiroia ondatrae, host species differences in susceptibility can influence infection patterns in multi-species communities (Johnson et al. 2008, Johnson and Hartson 2009). As a result, more diverse larval amphibian communities that include species with differing susceptibilities can alter parasite infection success and the resulting pathology in sensitive host species. For instance, larval toads (a sensitive species) raised experimentally alongside larval gray treefrogs (a resistant species) exhibited 37% less infection and fewer malformations (Johnson et al. 2008).

== Parasite-induced malformations and amphibian conservation ==
Perhaps the most unexplored, complex and vital aspects of trematode-caused amphibian malformations are the population-level consequences. Do these parasites and the malformations they induce pose a conservation risk? While no direct evidence linking trematode deformities and amphibian population declines exists, there are legitimate reasons for concern (Johnson and McKenzie 2008). For instance, in multiple species of frogs and toads, laboratory studies show that even low levels of Ribeiroia infection can induce 30-95% mortality (see Johnson et al. 2010). Correspondingly, multi-year field studies show that in localities of high infection and malformations in metamorphosing frogs, <2% of amphibians returning to breed exhibit malformations, suggesting Ribeiroia infection and malformations have deleterious consequences for individual survival and fecundity (Johnson et al. 2001). In specific wetlands that have historically exhibited a high prevalence of infection and malformations, several amphibian species have notably declined or disappeared (see Johnson and McKenzie 2008 for review). In light of these data, and the increasing evidence that Ribeiroia infections are on the rise (Johnson and McKenzie 2008), it is prudent to treat Ribeiroia ondatrae as a threat to amphibian populations and diversity, particularly in combination with other stressors.

== See also ==
- Ribeiroia ondatrae
