= Lauro Pereira Travassos =

Brazilian parasitologist

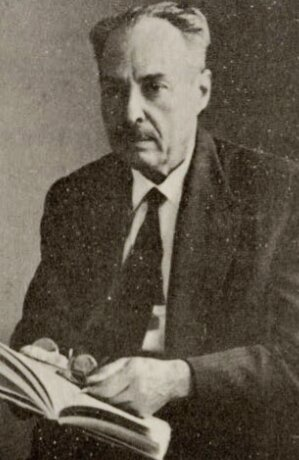

Lauro Pereira Travassos (2 July 1890 – 20 November 1970) was a Brazilian parasitologist. He collected helminth specimens from across South America and studied their life-histories. He built a Brazilian school of parasitology through his students. His son Lauro Pereira Travassos Filho (1918–1989) became an entomologist while another son Haroldo Pereira became an ichthyologist.

Travassos was born in Angra dos Reis. He studied medicine at Rio de Janeiro and his first work was on Linguatula serrata in the intestine of a patient. His doctoral thesis was on species of Heterakinae. He then worked at the Instituto Oswaldo Cruz which was then called the Manguinhos under José Gomes de Faria. He became chair of parasitology at the faculty of medicine in São Paulo in 1926. In 1929 he went to the tropical institute of Hamburg to work with the helminthologist Friedrich Fülleborn (1866–1933). He became a full professor in the Federal Rural University of Rio de Janeiro and taught at the Escola de Veterinária from the 1930s and began to establish a collection of helminths, and also taught at the Faculty of Medicine of São Paulo, now part of the University of São Paulo. He published nearly 420 papers on helminthology and a small number also on insects.

Travassos married Odete with whom he had four children including Lauro who became an entomologist and Haroldo who became an ichthyologist.
