= Stanley Howard Weitzman =

American ichthyologist (1927–2017)

Stanley Howard Weitzman (born March 16, 1927, in Mill Valley, California; died February 16, 2017) was a Research Scientist Emeritus at Division of Fishes, National Museum of Natural History, Washington, D.C.

== Life and career ==
He received his Bachelor's (1951) and Master's (1953) degrees in biology from the University of California, Berkeley, and his PhD (1960) from Stanford University as a student of the venerable killifish expert, George Sprague Myers. Weitzman began his long and distinguished career as a Curator in the Division of Fishes, National Museum of Natural History, in 1962. At that time he moved from California with his wife Marilyn and their two children.

== Awards and recognition ==
Weitzman's outstanding research was recognized by his peers: he received the Robert H. Gibbs Jr. Memorial Award for Excellence in Systematic Ichthyology for an outstanding body of published work in systematic ichthyology from the American Society of Ichthyologists and Herpetologists in 1991, and was honored at an international symposium on neotropical fishes in Brazil with an award for his "Invaluable Contributions to Neotropical Ichthyology" in 1997.

== Taxa named in his honor ==
Numerous taxa have been named after Weitzman:

- Lophiobrycon weitzmani R. M. C. Castro, A. C. Ribeiro, Benine & A. L. A. Melo, 2003 is a species of small characin endemic to Brazil, where it is found in the upper Paraná River basin.
- the darter Microcharacidium weitzmani Buckup, 1993
- the darter Poecilocharax weitzmani Géry, 1965.
- the Two Saddle cory cat Corydoras weitzmani Nijssen, 1971.
- the Atlantic pearlside or Weitzman's pearlside Maurolicus weitzmani Parin & Kobyliansky, 1993.
- the small freshwater fish Knodus weitzmani (Menezes, Netto-Ferreira & K. M. Ferreira, 2009)
- Jenynsia weitzmani Ghedotti, A. D. Meisner & Lucinda, 2001.
- Pseudocorynopoma stanleyi Malabarba, Chuctaya, Hirschmann, Oliveira & Thomaz, 2020

== Taxon described by him ==
- See Category:Taxa named by Stanley Howard Weitzman

== Publications ==
A Partial list.

- Stanley H. Weitzman; Richard P. Vari (1987). "Two new species and a new genus of miniature Characid Fishes (Teleostei: Characiformes) from Northern South America". Proceedings of the Biological Society of Washington. 100: 640–652.
- Fink W.L., Weitzman S.H. 1974. The so-called cheirodontin fishes of Central America with descriptions of two new species (Pisces: Characidae). Smithsonian Contrib. Zool. 172: 1–46
- Menezes N.A., Weitzman S.H. 1990. Two new species of Mimagoniates (Teleostei: Characidae: Glandulocaudinae), their phylogeny and biogeography and a key to the glandulocaudin fishes of Brazil and Paraguay. Proc. Biol. Soc. Wash. 103(2): 380–426.
- Weitzman S.H. 1962. The osteology of Brycon meeki, a generalized characid fish, with an osteological definition of the family. Stanford Ichthyol. Bull. 8(1): 1–77.
- Weitzman S.H., Fink S.V. 1985. Xenurobryconin phylogeny and putative pheromone pumps in Glandulocaudine fishes. Smithsonian Contrib. Zool. 421: 1–121p. Available from https://repository.si.edu/bitstream/handle/10088/5100/SCtZ-0421-Lo_res.pdf?sequence=2&isAllowed=y. [accessed 29 January 2023].
- Weitzman S.H., Vari R.P. 1987. Two new species and a new genus of miniature characid fishes (Teleostei: Characiformes) from Northern South America. Proc. Biol. Soc. Wash. 100(3): 640–652.
- Weitzman S.H., Vari R.P. 1988. Miniaturization in South American freshwater fishes: an overview and discussion. Proc. Biol. Soc. Wash. 101(2): 444–465.
