= Haroldo Pereira Travassos =

Brazilian ichthyologist

Haroldo Pereira Travassos (23 March 1922 - 13 June 1977) was a Brazilian ichthyologist. He taught at the La-Fayette Institute, the Fluminense Federal University, and the Federal University of Rio de Janeiro.

Travassos was born in Rio de Janeiro, the son of the helminthologist Lauro Pereira and his wife Odette. He grew up in the city and went to the National School of Veterinary Medicine where he graduated in 1944 and received a medical degree in 1945. He worked with his father both in the field and laboratory and became a naturalist at the National Museum becoming a professor in 1969. He began to specialize in the fishes and became a director of fisheries development in 1966. As a fish taxonomist, he specialized in the families Characidae, Cichlidae and Sciaenidae.

== Taxon described by him ==
- See Category:Taxa named by Harogldo Pereira Travassos

== Taxon named in his honor ==
- Characidium travassosi Melo, Buckup & Oyakawa 2016
- Crenicichla haroldoi Luengo & Britski 1974
