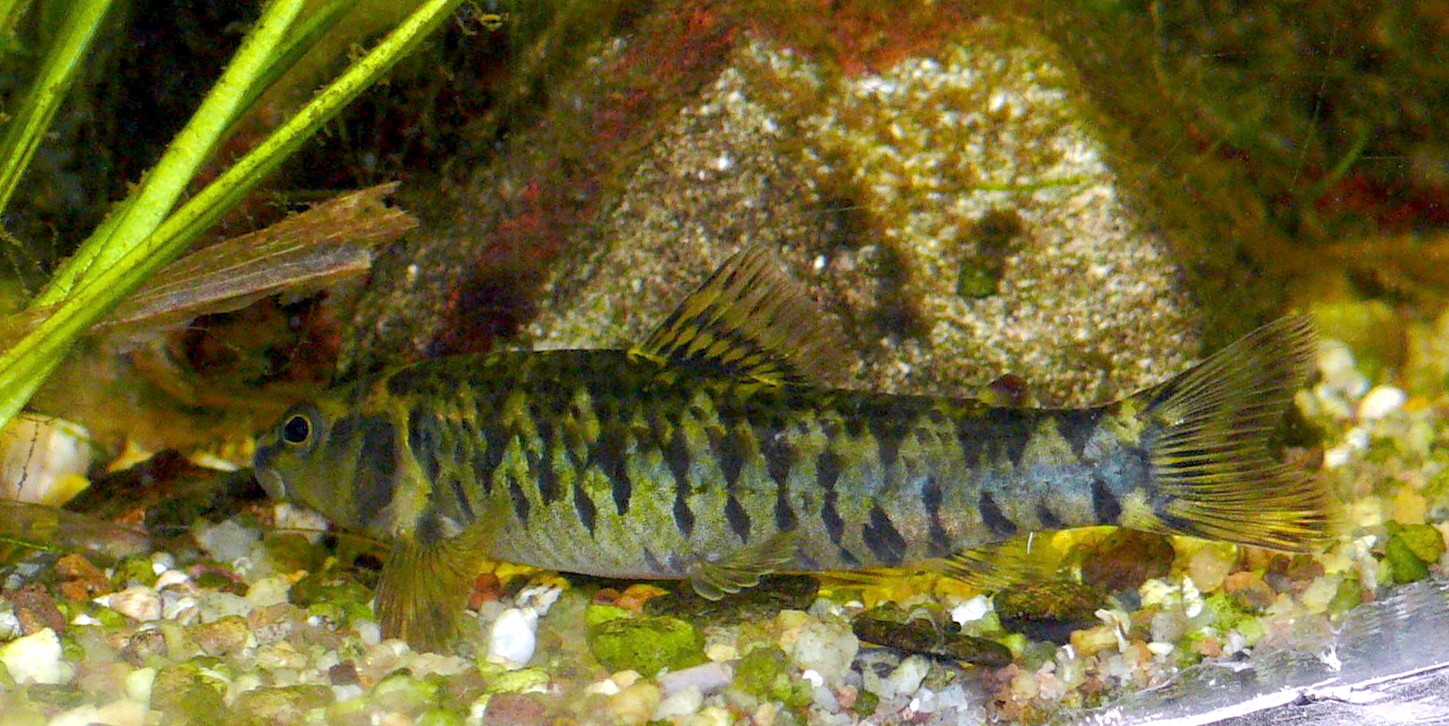
- Characidium fasciatum

Scientific classification
- Kingdom: Animalia
- Phylum: Chordata
- Class: Actinopterygii
- (unranked): Otophysi
- Order: Characiformes
- Suborder: Characoidei
- Family: Crenuchidae; Günther, 1864

= Crenuchidae =

Family of fishes

The Crenuchidae, or crenuchids, are a family of freshwater fish of the order Characiformes. The 11 genera include about 115 species, though several species are undescribed. These fish are relatively small (usually under 10 cm (4 in) in standard length) and originate from eastern Panama and South America. Both subfamilies were previously included in the family Characidae, and were placed in a separate family by Buckup, 1998. Buckup, 1993, revised all genera, except Characidium.

They are the only members of the superfamily Crenuchoidea. They are sister to all other members of the suborder Characoidei, and diverged during the Early Cretaceous, prior to the split between the African characins (Alestoidea) and the other South American characins (Erythrinoidea and Characoidea). This suggests that their divergence likely predates the breakup of Gondwana, when the divergence between those groups likely occurred.

Members of the subfamily Characidiinae are known as South American darters due to their superficial resemblance to North American darters, but they are otherwise unrelated.

== Taxonomy ==
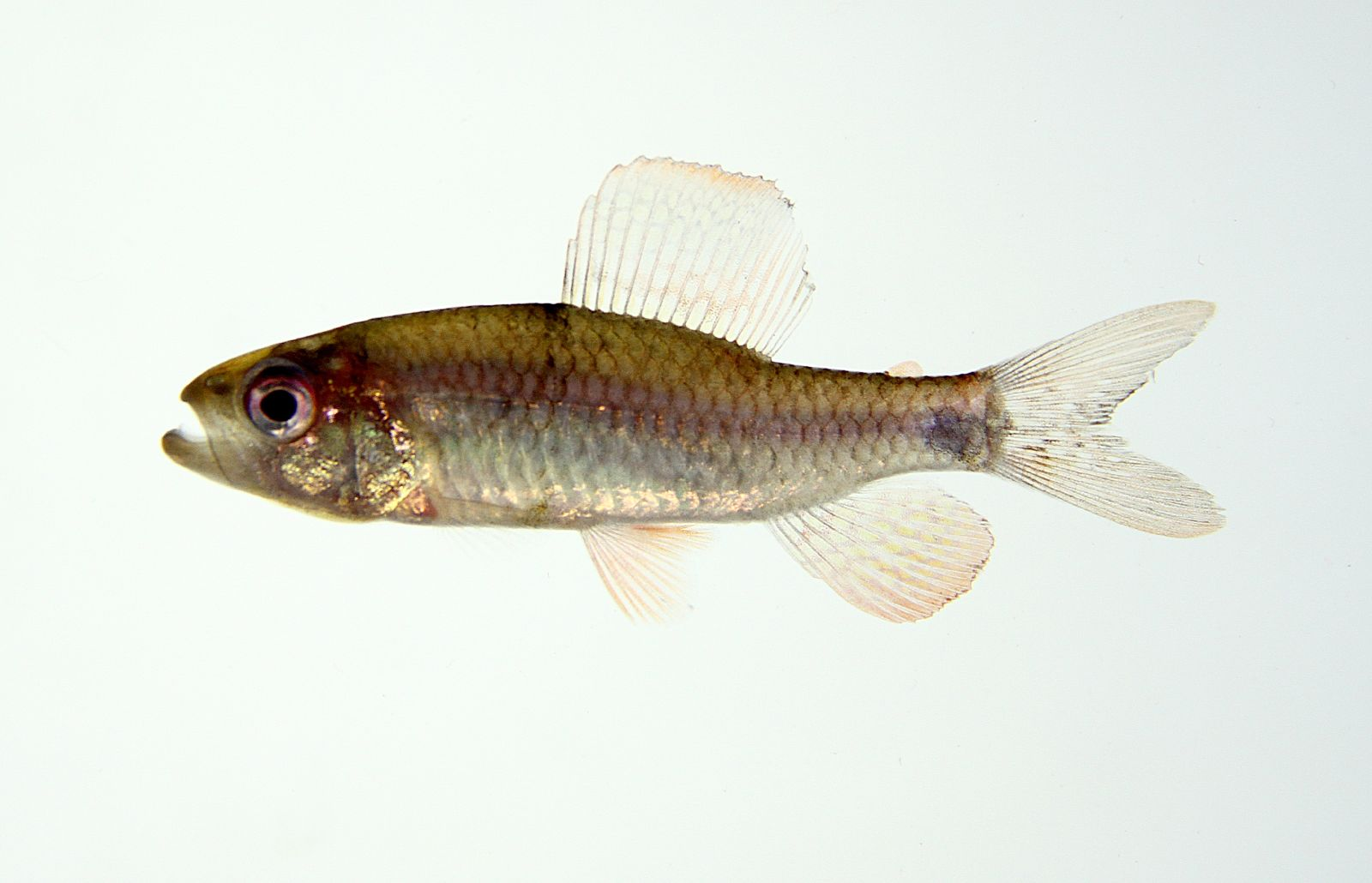
Crenuchus spilurus

The following taxonomy is based on Eschmeyer's Catalog of Fishes (2025):

- Subfamily Crenuchinae Günther, 1864 (sailfin tetras)
  - Crenuchus Günther, 1863
  - Poecilocharax C. H. Eigenmann, 1909
- Subfamily Characidiinae Fowler, 1932 (South American darters)
  - Ammocryptocharax Weitzman & Kanazawa, 1976
  - Characidium Reinhardt, 1867
  - Elachocharax Myers, 1927
  - Klausewitzia Géry, 1965
  - Leptocharacidium Buckup, 1993
  - Melanocharacidium Buckup, 1993
  - Microcharacidium Buckup, 1993
  - Odontocharacidium Buckup, 1993
  - Skiotocharax Presswell, Weitzman & Bergquist, 2000

== See also ==
- List of fish families
