= Hyphessobrycon coelestinus =

Conservation status
- Endangered (IUCN 3.1)

Scientific classification
- Kingdom: Animalia
- Phylum: Chordata
- Class: Actinopterygii
- Order: Characiformes
- Family: Acestrorhamphidae
- Genus: Hyphessobrycon
- Species: H. coelestinus

Binomial name
- Hyphessobrycon coelestinus Myers, 1929

Species of fish

Hyphessobrycon coelestinus is a species of freshwater ray-finned fish belonging to the family Acestrorhamphidae, the American characins. This fish is found in Brazil.

== Description ==
Hyphessobrycon coelestinus is quite similar to Hyphessobrycon columbianus in shape and coloration. Differences include a red head and red band above the midlateral line starting at the gills and ending at the dorsal fin.

== Distribution ==
Hyphessobrycon coelestinus is known to inhabit the Upper Paraná River Basin in Brazil. This fish is benthopelagic, meaning that it resides away from the surface of the water.
