= Liolaemus loboi =

Conservation status
- Endangered (IUCN 3.1)

Scientific classification
- Kingdom: Animalia
- Phylum: Chordata
- Class: Reptilia
- Order: Squamata
- Suborder: Iguania
- Family: Liolaemidae
- Genus: Liolaemus
- Species: L. loboi

Binomial name
- Liolaemus loboi Abdala, 2003

Species of lizard

Liolaemus loboi is a species of lizard in the family Liolaemidae. The species is endemic to Argentina.

== Etymology ==
The specific name, loboi, is in honor of Argentinian herpetologist Fernando José Lobo.

== Description ==
Medium-sized for its genus, L. loboi may attain a snout-to-vent length (SVL) of 7.25 cm (2.85 in).

== Geographic range ==
L. loboi is found in Neuquén Province and Río Negro Province, Argentina.

== Habitat ==
The preferred natural habitat of L. loboi is shrubland on sandy soil, at altitudes of 800–900 m (2,600–3,000 ft).

== Behavior and ecology ==
L. loboi is terrestrial. It is strictly associated with neneo (Mulinum spinosum) thorn bushes and coirón (Festuca gracillima) grass.

== Diet ==
L. loboi preys predominately upon insects.

== Reproduction ==
L. loboi is oviparous.

== Taxonomy ==
L. loboi belongs to the L. boulengeri species group.
