= Liolaemus grosseorum =

Conservation status
- Least Concern (IUCN 3.1)

Scientific classification
- Kingdom: Animalia
- Phylum: Chordata
- Class: Reptilia
- Order: Squamata
- Suborder: Iguania
- Family: Liolaemidae
- Genus: Liolaemus
- Species: L. grosseorum

Binomial name
- Liolaemus grosseorum Etheridge, 2001

Species of lizard

Liolaemus grosseorum is a species of lizard in the family Liolaemidae. The species is endemic to Argentina.

== Etymology ==
The specific name, grosseorum (Latin, genitive, plural), is in honor of the family of Argentinian herpetologist Monique Halloy Grosse, which include her husband Constantino, and their children Ana and Paul.

== Geographic range ==
L. grosseorum is found in central Argentina in the provinces of La Pampa, Mendoza, Neuquén, and Río Negro.

== Habitat ==
The preferred natural habitats of L. grosseorum are shrubland and grassland, at altitudes of 250–1,500 m (820–4,920 ft).

== Description ==
Small for its genus, L. grosseorum may attain a snout-to-vent length (SVL) of 5.5 cm (2.2 in).

== Diet ==
L. grosseorum preys predominately upon insects.

== Reproduction ==
l. grosseorum is oviparous.

== Taxonomy ==
L. grosseorum has been considered to be a member of the L. boulengeri species group and the L. darwinii species group.
