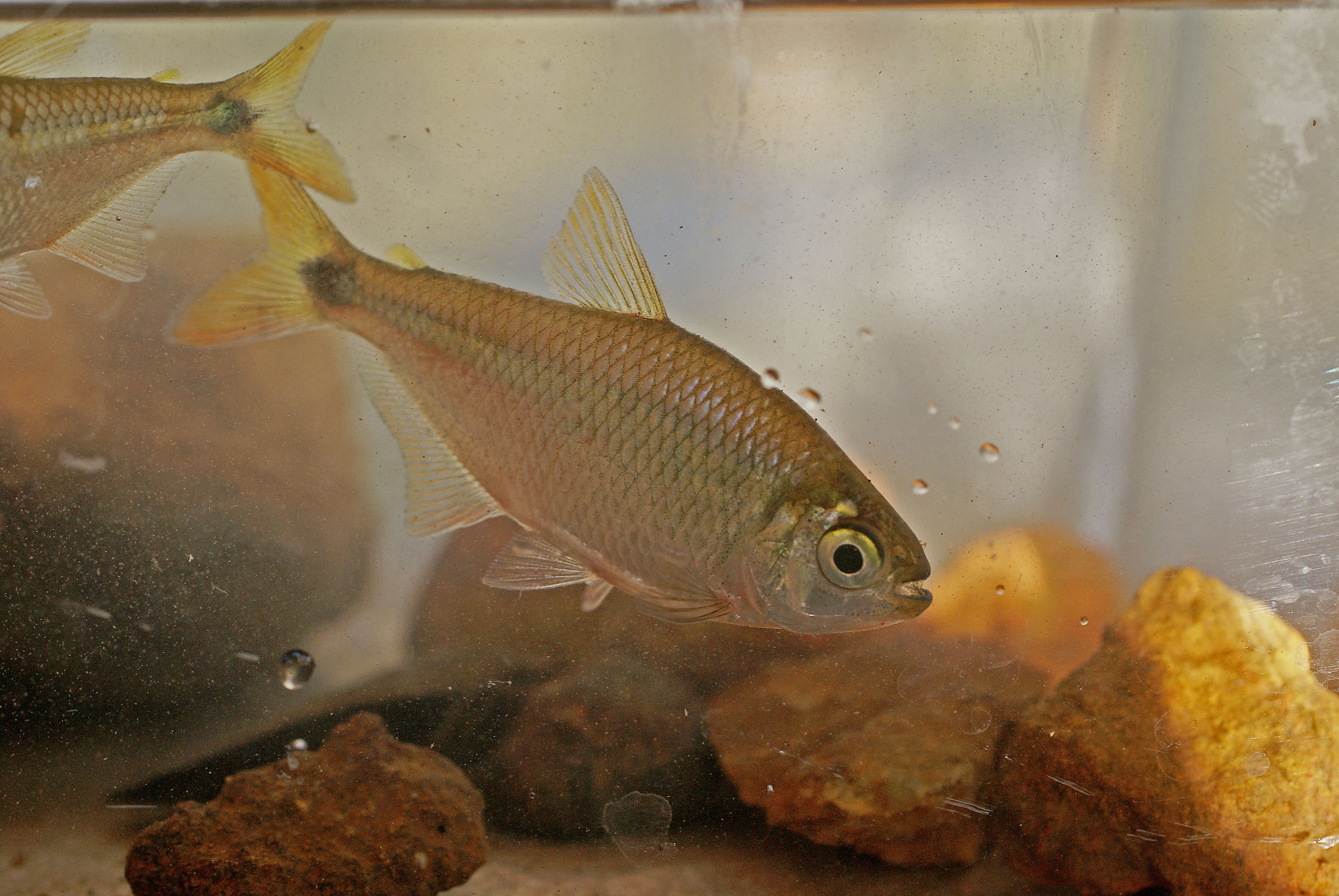

Conservation status
- Vulnerable (IUCN 3.1)

Scientific classification
- Kingdom: Animalia
- Phylum: Chordata
- Class: Actinopterygii
- Order: Characiformes
- Family: Acestrorhamphidae
- Genus: Hyphessobrycon
- Species: H. panamensis

Binomial name
- Hyphessobrycon panamensis Durbin, 1908

Synonyms
- Hemigrammus minutus Meek and Hildebrand, 1912

= Hyphessobrycon panamensis =

Species of fish

Hyphessobrycon panamensis, the Panama tetra, is a species of freshwater ray-finned fish belonging to the family Acestrorhamphidae, the American characins. This fish is found in Central America.

== Taxonomy ==
The Panama tetra was first discovered between 1865 and 1866 during the Thayer Expedition, when specimens were collected from the Boqueron River of Panama. These specimens were later studied by American ichthyologist Marion Durbin Ellis, who determined that they represented a species unknown to science at the time. In 1908, she established Hyphessobrycon as a subgenus of Hemigrammus and assigned this species to it, giving it the scientific name Hyphessobrycon panamensis. However, she did not designate any of the specimens as a holotype, so instead one of them (with the specimen number USNM 120416) was designated as the lectotype in 2020, while the rest became paralectotypes. In 1917, German-American ichthyologist Carl H. Eigenmann elevated Hyphessobrycon to genus level, determining that its members (including the Panama tetra) represent a separate grouping from Hemigrammus.

In 1912, American ichthyologists Seth Eugene Meek and Samuel Frederick Hildebrand established a new fish species which they named Hemigrammus minutus. This was done based on analysis of specimens collected from streams in the Panama Canal Zone, with one kept in the Field Museum of Natural History and given the specimen number FMNH 7572, being designated as the holotype of the species. A year later, Eigenmann determined that this species does not differ significantly from Hyphessobrycon panamensis and should therefore be considered a junior synonym of it. This synonymy was further confirmed in a 2020 study by additional examination of specimens that have been attributed to both names.

=== Reclassified populations ===
The following types of fish were formerly thought to be populations of Hyphessobrycon panamensis, but have since been discovered to represent different species.

- Hyphessobrycon bussingi from Costa Rica and western Panama have been reported as members of Hyphessobrycon panamensis since 1928, but were eventually determined to be a separate species and scientifically named in 2020.
- Hyphessobrycon columbianus was initially believed to be a member of Astyanax or Moenkhausia, and later considered a variant of either Hyphessobrycon ecuadoriensis or Hyphessobrycon panamensis. It was first recognised as a previously unknown species and scientifically named in 2002.
- Hyphessobrycon condotensis was first named as a new species in 1913, but was declared as a junior synonym of Hyphessobrycon panamensis in 1922. However, the former species was revalidated in 2002, and a study published in 2020 further supported its validity.
- Hyphessobrycon daguae was originally described as a subspecies of Hyphessobrycon panamensis in 1922 under the name H. p. daguae. It was later considered a junior synonym of either Hyphessobrycon condotensis or Hyphessobrycon panamensis, but a 2020 study determined that it is a valid species separate from both other species.
