= Hyphessobrycon savagei =

Conservation status
- Vulnerable (IUCN 3.1)

Scientific classification
- Kingdom: Animalia
- Phylum: Chordata
- Class: Actinopterygii
- Order: Characiformes
- Family: Acestrorhamphidae
- Genus: Hyphessobrycon
- Species: H. savagei

Binomial name
- Hyphessobrycon savagei Bussing, 1967

Species of fish

Hyphessobrycon savagei, the Savage tetra, is a species of freshwater ray-finned fish in the family Acestrorhamphidae, the American characins. This fish is found in Central America in the Pacific drainages between the Jicote River near the town of Parrita and the Esquines River Basin of Costa Rica. In the Corcovado National Park of Costa Rica specifically, savage tetra live in the same environment as yellow tetra.

== Description ==
The savage tetra resembles many of the other species in the genus Hyphessobrycon with a streamline body, large black-colored eyes but has more of a silvery color of its scales with yellow colorations on the ventral side and the dorsal surface with red colorations visible on its dorsal, pelvic, anal, caudal, and pectoral fins. It has a standard length (SL) of 3.72 centimeters and has 4 humeral bars.

== Environment ==
The savage tetra is a benthopelagic fish found in freshwater creeks and shorelines at an elevation of between 0 and 70 meters. It's found in tropical regions and at a temperature of 24 to 30 Celsius.

== Eponymy ==
The savage tetra gets its species name and common name from the American educator and herpetologist Jay Mathers Savage who has done much work on the herpetofauna of Central America.
