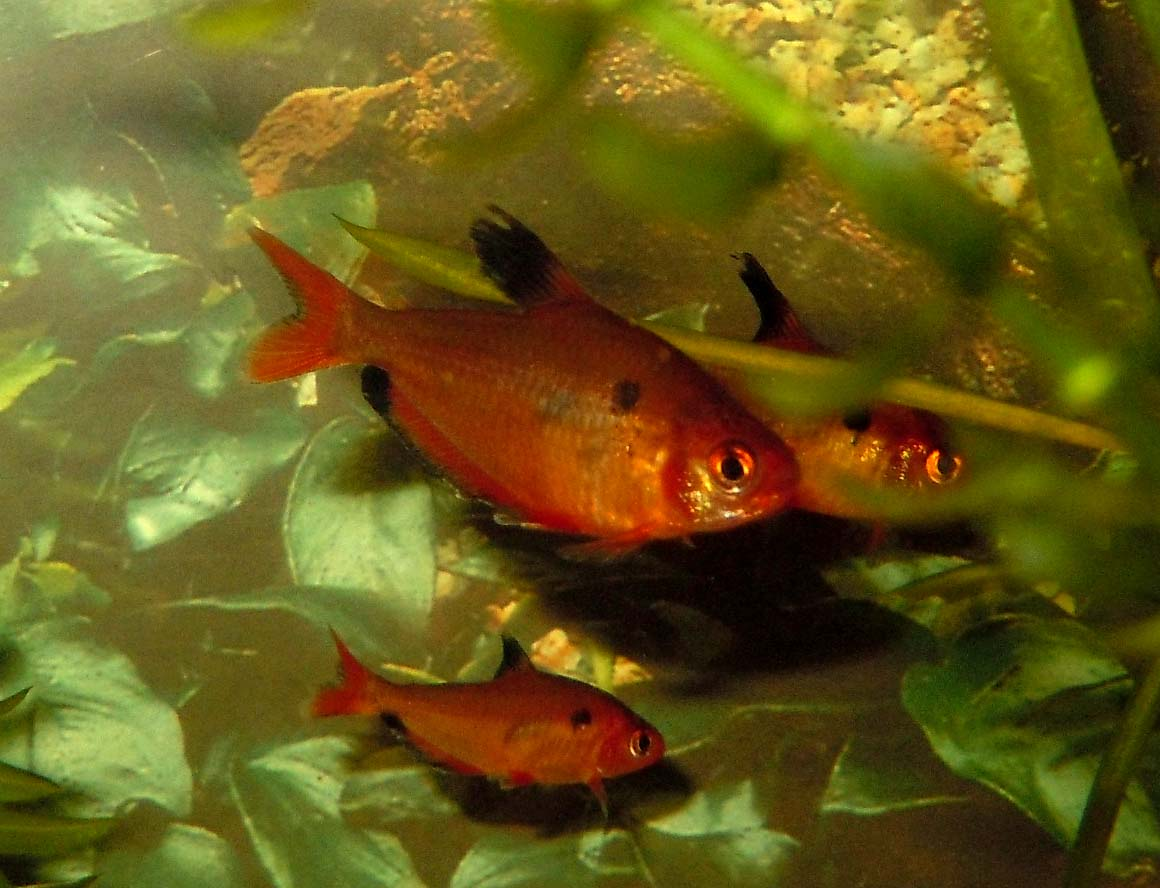

Conservation status
- Least Concern (IUCN 3.1)

Scientific classification
- Kingdom: Animalia
- Phylum: Chordata
- Class: Actinopterygii
- Order: Characiformes
- Family: Acestrorhamphidae
- Genus: Hyphessobrycon
- Species: H. minor

Binomial name
- Hyphessobrycon minor Durbin, 1909

= Minor tetra =

Species of fish

The minor tetra (Hyphessobrycon minor) is a species of freshwater ray-finned fish belonging to the family Acestrorhamphidae, the American characins. This fish is from the Essequibo River in Guyana in South America, closely resembling its relative, the serpae tetra, from the Amazon and Paraguay. These two very similar species are separated geographically, so they would not interbreed.
