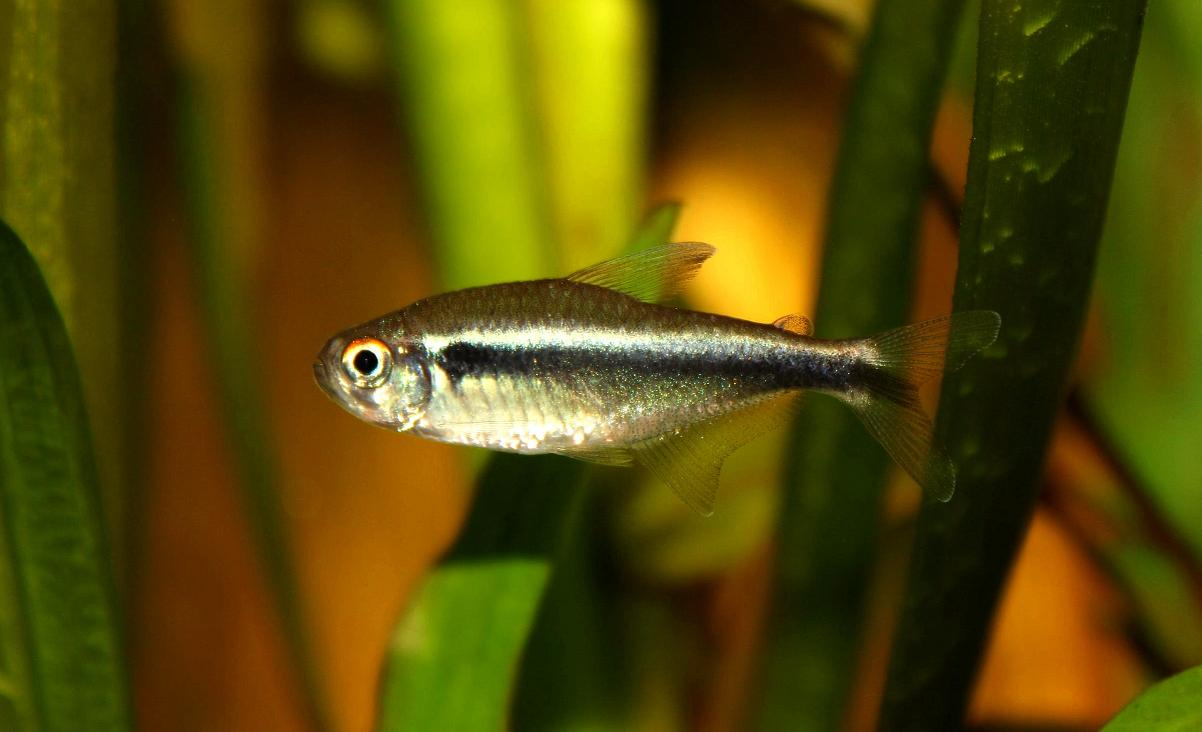
- Hyphessobrycon herbertaxelrodi

Scientific classification
- Kingdom: Animalia
- Phylum: Chordata
- Class: Actinopterygii
- Order: Characiformes
- Family: Acestrorhamphidae
- Subfamily: Hyphessobryconinae
- Genus: Hyphessobrycon; Durbin, 1908

Type species
- Hemigrammus compressus Meek, 1904

Species
- nearly 150, see text

Synonyms
- Dermatocheir Durbin, 1909 Genus inquirenda; Pseudopristella Géry, 1960

= Hyphessobrycon =

Genus of fishes

Hyphessobrycon is a genus of freshwater ray-finned fish belonging to the family Acestrorhamphidae, the American characins. These species are among the fishes known as tetras. The genus is distributed in the Neotropical realm from southern Mexico to Río de la Plata in Argentina. Many of these species are native to South America; about six species are from Central America, and a single species, H. compressus, is from southern Mexico.

All small fishes, the Hyphessobrycon tetras reach maximum overall lengths of about 1.7–9.6 cm (0.7–3.8 in). Great anatomical diversity exists in this genus. They are generally of typical characin shape, but vary greatly in coloration and body form, many species having distinctive black, red, or yellow markings on their bodies and fins. These species are generally omnivorous, feeding predominantly on small crustaceans, insects, annelid worms, and zooplankton. When spawning, they scatter their eggs and guard neither eggs nor young.

== Taxonomy ==
Hyphessobrycon was first proposed as a monospecific genus in 1908 by the American entomologist and ichthyologist Marion Durbin, with its type species designated as Hemigrammus compressus, a species described in 1904 by Seth Eugene Meek, with its type locality given as the Río Papaloapam basin at El Hule, Oaxaca, Mexico. The genus Hyphessobrycon is the type genus of the subfamily Hyphessobryconinae, within the American characin family Acestrorhamphidae. This family is classified within the suborder Characoidei of the order Characiformes.

This large genus of characins includes nearly 150 species. The systematics of Hyphessobrycon are still largely unresolved. Six groups within this genus have been recognized based on color patterns alone. With no phylogenetic analysis of this genus, species are placed into this genus as anatomically defined by Carl H. Eigenmann in 1917. By this definition, Hyphessobrycon is identified by the presence of an adipose fin, incomplete lateral line, two tooth series in the premaxilla, with the teeth of the external series continuous in a single series, teeth not strictly conical, preventral scales arranged in more than one row and lack of scales in the caudal fin. The characteristic of extension of scales onto the caudal fin that differentiates this genus from Hemigrammus is not satisfactory, as it occurs in intermediate conditions.

This genus, as traditionally defined, was not monophyletic. A monophyletic group within Hyphessobrycon has been hypothesized, termed the rosy tetra clade; this group is based upon coloration pattern and the shape of dorsal and anal fins of males. In 2024, this clade was split from Hyphessobrycon as the revived genus Megalamphodus, and was found to belong to a different tetra subfamily. Recognition of monophyletic groups among Hyphessobrycon species is complicated by the difficulty in finding characters useful for hypothesis of relationships among the species. Traditional characters used to identify Hyphessobrycon are phylogenetically unreliable.

== Etymology ==
The generic name, Hyphessobrycon, is of slightly uncertain origin. The second part derives from the Greek βρύκω (to bite); the first derives from an ostensible Greek hyphesson, which may be an error for υπελάσσων (slightly smaller).

== Relationship to humans ==
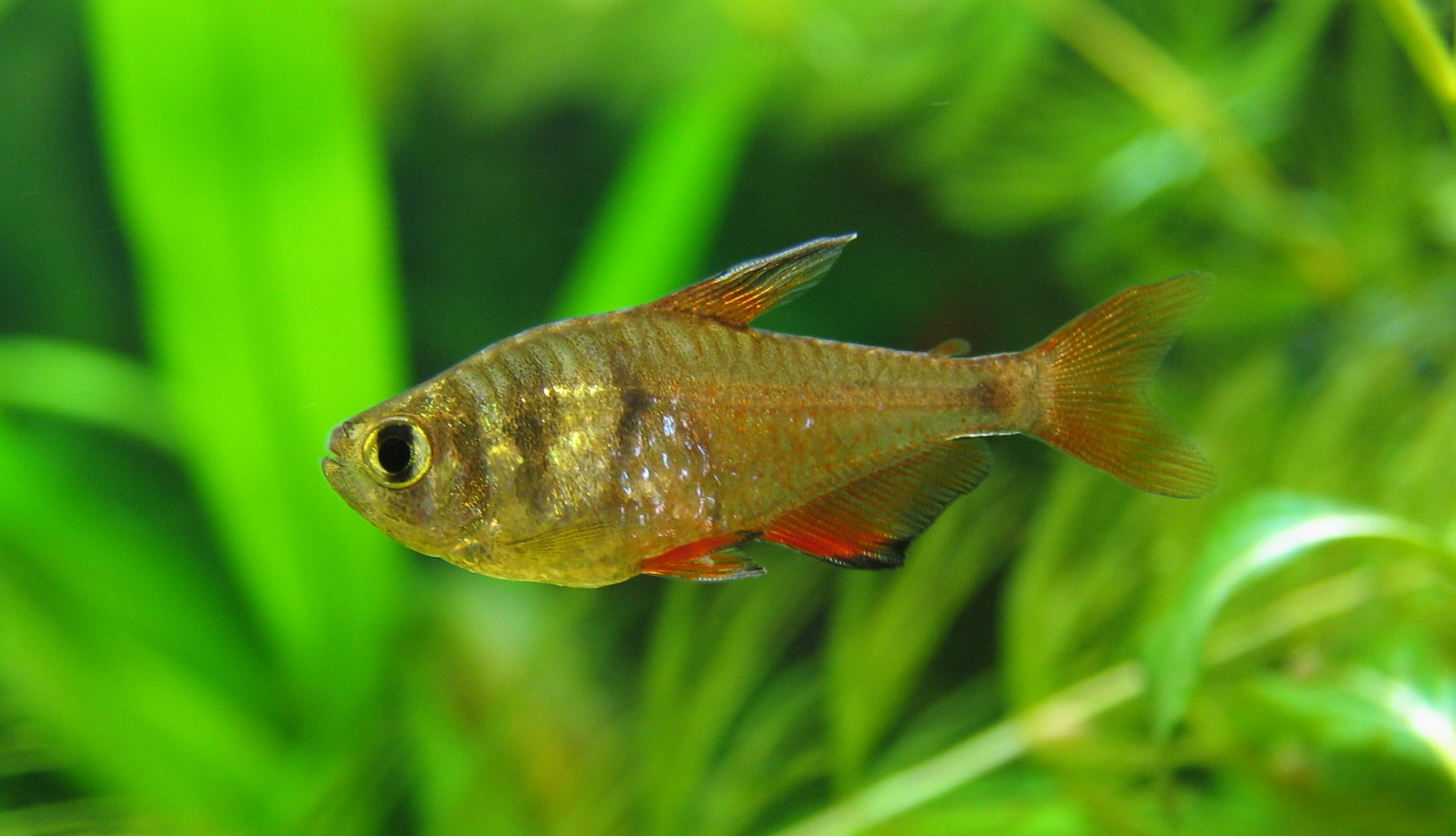
The flame tetra (H. flammeus) is bred in large numbers in captivity and common in the aquarium trade, but rare in the wild.

Most of the species in the genus have not been rated by the IUCN Red List as Threatened, but many species have small distributions and at least three, H. flammeus, H. coelestinus and H. duragenys, are classified as endangered. One, H. taurocephalus, is categorised as possibly extinct. This species only occurs in a few rivers and streams in Santa Catarina and Paraná states of Brazil.

Many Hyphessobrycon species are popular aquarium fish, and some, including H. flammeus, are bred in large numbers in captivity.

== Species ==
Hyphessobrycon contains the following valid species:

- Hyphessobrycon acaciae García-Alzate, Román-Valencia & Prada-Pedreros, 2010
- Hyphessobrycon agulha Fowler, 1913 (red-tailed flag tetra)
- Hyphessobrycon albolineatum Fernández-Yépez, 1950
- Hyphessobrycon amandae Géry & Uj, 1987 (ember tetra)
- Hyphessobrycon amapaensis Zarske & Géry, 1998 (red-line tetra)
- Hyphessobrycon amaronensis García-Alzate, Román-Valencia & Taphorn, 2010
- Hyphessobrycon arianae Uj & Géry, 1989
- Hyphessobrycon atencioi Ardila Rodríguez, 2022
- Hyphessobrycon auca Almirón, Casciotta, Bechara & Ruíz Díaz, 2004
- Hyphessobrycon axelrodi (Travassos, 1959) (calypso tetra)
- Hyphessobrycon barranquilla Ardila Rodríguez, 2022
- Hyphessobrycon bayleyi F. C. T. Lima, Bastos, Rapp Py-Daniel & Ota, 2022
- Hyphessobrycon bifasciatus Ellis, 1911 (yellow tetra)
- Hyphessobrycon borealis Zarske, Le Bail & Géry, 2006
- Hyphessobrycon boulengeri (C. H. Eigenmann, 1907)
- Hyphessobrycon brumado Zanata & Camelier, 2010
- Hyphessobrycon bussingi Ota, F. R. Carvalho & Pavanelli, 2020
- Hyphessobrycon cachimbensis Travassos, 1964
- Hyphessobrycon cantoi Faria, K. L. A. Guimarães, Rodrigues, Oliveira & F. C. T. Lima, 2021
- Hyphessobrycon caru E. C. Guimarães, Brito, Feitosa, Carvalho-Costa & Ottoni, 2019
- Hyphessobrycon catableptus (Durbin, 1909)
- Hyphessobrycon chiribiquete García‐Alzate, Lima, Taphorn, Mojica, Urbano‐Bonilla & Teixeira, 2020
- Hyphessobrycon citrus Marinho & Dagosta, 2024
- Hyphessobrycon clavatus Zarske, 2015
- Hyphessobrycon coelestinus Myers, 1929
- Hyphessobrycon columbianus Zarske & Géry, 2002
- Hyphessobrycon comodoro Dagosta, Seren, Ferreira & Marinho, 2022
- Hyphessobrycon compressus (Meek, 1904) (Mayan tetra)
- Hyphessobrycon condotensis Regan, 1913
- Hyphessobrycon corozalensis Ardila Rodríguez, 2022
- Hyphessobrycon cyanotaenia Zarske & Géry, 2006 (lapis tetra)
- Hyphessobrycon daguae C. H. Eigenmann, 1922
- Hyphessobrycon delimai Teixeira, Netto-Ferreira, Birindelli & Sousa, 2016
- Hyphessobrycon diancistrus S. H. Weitzman, 1977
- Hyphessobrycon dorsalis Zarske, 2014
- Hyphessobrycon duragenys Ellis, 1911
- Hyphessobrycon ecuadorensis (C. H. Eigenmann, 1915)
- Hyphessobrycon ecuadoriensis C. H. Eigenmann & Henn, 1914
- Hyphessobrycon eilyos F. C. T. Lima & Moreira, 2003
- Hyphessobrycon elachys M. J. Weitzman, 1985
- Hyphessobrycon eos Durbin, 1909 (dawn tetra)
- Hyphessobrycon ericae Moreira & Lima, 2017
- Hyphessobrycon eschwartzae García-Alzate, Román-Valencia & Ortega, 2013
- Hyphessobrycon flammeus Myers, 1924 (flame tetra)
- Hyphessobrycon frankei Zarske & Géry, 1997
- Hyphessobrycon frickei E. C. Guimarães, Brito, Bragança, Katz & Ottoni, 2020
- Hyphessobrycon georgettae Géry, 1961
- Hyphessobrycon geryi E. C. Guimarães, Brito, Bragança, Katz & Ottoni, 2020
- Hyphessobrycon gracilior Géry, 1964
- Hyphessobrycon griemi Hoedeman, 1957 (gold-spotted tetra)
- Hyphessobrycon hasemani Fowler, 1913
- Hyphessobrycon heliacus Moreira, Landim & Costa, 2002
- Hyphessobrycon herbertaxelrodi Géry, 1961 (black-neon tetra)
- Hyphessobrycon heteresthes (Ulrey, 1894) (Nomen dubium)
- Hyphessobrycon heterorhabdus (Ulrey, 1894) (flag tetra)
- Hyphessobrycon hexastichos Bertaco & T. P. Carvalho, 2005
- Hyphessobrycon hildae Fernández-Yépez, 1950
- Hyphessobrycon igneus Miquelarena, Menni, López & Casciotta, 1980
- Hyphessobrycon inconstans (C. H. Eigenmann & Ogle, 1907)
- Hyphessobrycon isiri Almirón, Casciotta & Körber, 2006
- Hyphessobrycon itaparicensis S. M. Q. Lima & W. J. E. M. Costa, 2001
- Hyphessobrycon jackrobertsi Zarske, 2014
- Hyphessobrycon juruna Faria, F. C. T. Lima & Bastos, 2018
- Hyphessobrycon kayabi Teixeira, F. C. T. Lima & Zuanon, 2014
- Hyphessobrycon klausanni García-Alzate, Urbano-Bonilla & Taphorn, 2017
- Hyphessobrycon krenakore Teixeira, Netto-Ferreira, Birindelli & Sousa, 2016
- Hyphessobrycon loretoensis Ladiges, 1938 (Loreto tetra)
- Hyphessobrycon loweae W. J. E. M. Costa & Géry, 1994
- Hyphessobrycon lucenorum Ohara & F. C. T. Lima, 2015
- Hyphessobrycon maculicauda Ahl, 1936 (Species inquirenda)
- Hyphessobrycon mamuruensis Faria, Oliveira, Monteiro & F. C. T. Lima 2025
- Hyphessobrycon mapinguari Pastana, Dutra, Ohara, Teixeira & Menezes, 2025
- Hyphessobrycon margitae Zarske, 2016
- Hyphessobrycon mavro García-Alzate, Román-Valencia & Prada-Pedreros, 2010
- Hyphessobrycon melanostichos T. P. Carvalho & Bertaco, 2006
- Hyphessobrycon melasemeion Fowler, 1945 (Nomen dubium)
- Hyphessobrycon melazonatus Durbin, 1908
- Hyphessobrycon meridionalis Ringuelet, Miquelarena & Menni, 1978
- Hyphessobrycon metae C. H. Eigenmann & Henn, 1914
- Hyphessobrycon minimus Durbin, 1909
- Hyphessobrycon minor Durbin, 1909
- Hyphessobrycon moniliger Moreira, F. C. T. Lima & W. J. E. M. Costa, 2002
- Hyphessobrycon montagi F. C. T. Lima, Coutinho & Wosiacki, 2014
- Hyphessobrycon mutabilis W. J. E. M. Costa & Géry, 1994
- Hyphessobrycon myrmex Pastana, D'Agosta & Esguícero, 2017
- Hyphessobrycon natagaima García-Alzate, Taphorn, Román-Valencia & Villa-Navarro, 2015
- Hyphessobrycon nicolasi Miquelarena & López, 2010
- Hyphessobrycon niger García-Alzate, Román-Valencia & Prada-Pedreros, 2010
- Hyphessobrycon nigricinctus Zarske & Géry, 2004 (morado tetra)
- Hyphessobrycon notidanos T. P. Carvalho & Bertaco, 2006
- Hyphessobrycon ocasoensis García-Alzate & Román-Valencia, 2008
- Hyphessobrycon ocoae (Fowler, 1943)
- Hyphessobrycon olayai Ardila Rodríguez, 2022
- Hyphessobrycon oritoensis García-Alzate, Román-Valencia & Taphorn, 2008
- Hyphessobrycon otrynus Benine & Lopes, 2008
- Hyphessobrycon paepkei Zarske, 2014
- Hyphessobrycon panamensis Durbin, 1908
- Hyphessobrycon pando Hein, 2009 (Pando tetra)
- Hyphessobrycon pastanai Faria, Ohara, Monteiro & Oliveira, 2026
- Hyphessobrycon parvellus Ellis, 1911
- Hyphessobrycon paucilepis García-Alzate, Román-Valencia & Taphorn, 2008
- Hyphessobrycon peruvianus Ladiges, 1938 (Peruvian tetra)
- Hyphessobrycon petricolus Ohara, Lima & Barros, 2017
- Hyphessobrycon peugeoti Ingenito, Lima & Buckup, 2013
- Hyphessobrycon piabinhas Fowler, 1941
- Hyphessobrycon pinnistriatus F. R. Carvalho, Cabeceira & L. N. Carvalho, 2017
- Hyphessobrycon piorskii E. C. Guimarães, Brito, Feitosa, Carvalho-Costa & Ottoni, 2018
- Hyphessobrycon piranga Camelier, Dagosta & Marinho, 2018
- Hyphessobrycon platyodus Ohara, Abrahão & Espíndola, 2017
- Hyphessobrycon poecilioides C. H. Eigenmann, 1913
- Hyphessobrycon procerus Mahnert & Géry, 1987
- Hyphessobrycon procyon Pastana & Ohara, 2016
- Hyphessobrycon psittacus Dagosta, Marinho, Camelier & F. C. T. Lima, 2016
- Hyphessobrycon pulchripinnis Ahl, 1937 (lemon tetra)
- Hyphessobrycon pyrrhonotus Burgess, 1993
- Hyphessobrycon pytai Géry & Mahnert, 1993
- Hyphessobrycon quibdoensis Ardila Rodríguez, 2022
- Hyphessobrycon reticulatus Ellis, 1911
- Hyphessobrycon reyae Ardila Rodríguez, 2022
- Hyphessobrycon rheophilus Ohara, Teixeira, Albornoz-Garzón, Mirande & F. C. T. Lima, 2019
- Hyphessobrycon ribeiroi Lima, Silva-Oliveira, Oliveira & Faria, 2025
- Hyphessobrycon robustulus (Cope, 1870)
- Hyphessobrycon roseus (Géry, 1960)
- Hyphessobrycon rutiliflavidus Carvalho, Langeani, Miyazawa & Troy, 2008
- Hyphessobrycon saizi Géry, 1964
- Hyphessobrycon santae (C. H. Eigenmann, 1907)
- Hyphessobrycon sateremawe Faria, Bastos, Zuanon & F. C. T. Lima, 2020
- Hyphessobrycon savagei Bussing, 1967
- Hyphessobrycon schauenseei Fowler, 1926
- Hyphessobrycon scholzei Ahl, 1937 (black-line tetra)
- Hyphessobrycon scutulatus Lucena, 2003
- Hyphessobrycon simulatus (Géry, 1960)
- Hyphessobrycon sovichthys Schultz, 1944
- Hyphessobrycon stegemanni Géry, 1961 (savanna tetra)
- Hyphessobrycon stramineus Durbin, 1918 (Nomen dubium)
- Hyphessobrycon taguae García-Alzate, Román-Valencia & Taphorn, 2010
- Hyphessobrycon takasei Géry, 1964 (coffee-bean tetra)
- Hyphessobrycon taphorni García-Alzate, Román-Valencia & Ortega, 2013
- Hyphessobrycon taurocephalus Ellis, 1911
- Hyphessobrycon tenuis Géry, 1964
- Hyphessobrycon tortuguerae Böhlke, 1958
- Hyphessobrycon troemneri (Fowler, 1942)
- Hyphessobrycon tropis Géry, 1963
- Hyphessobrycon tukunai Géry, 1965
- Hyphessobrycon tuyensis García-Alzate, Román-Valencia & Taphorn, 2008
- Hyphessobrycon vanzolinii F. C. T. Lima & Flausino, 2016
- Hyphessobrycon veredus Teixeira, Dutra, Penido, Santos & Pessali, 2019
- Hyphessobrycon vilmae Géry, 1966
- Hyphessobrycon vinaceus Bertaco, Malabarba & Dergam, 2007
- Hyphessobrycon wadai Marinho, D'Agosta, Camelier & Oyakawa, 2016 (blueberry tetra)
- Hyphessobrycon wajat Almirón & Casciotta, 1999
- Hyphessobrycon weitzmanorum F. C. T. Lima & Moreira, 2003
- Hyphessobrycon werneri Géry & Uj, 1987
- Hyphessobrycon wosiackii Moreira & F. C. T. Lima, 2017
- Hyphessobrycon zoe Faria, Lima & Wosiacki, 2020
