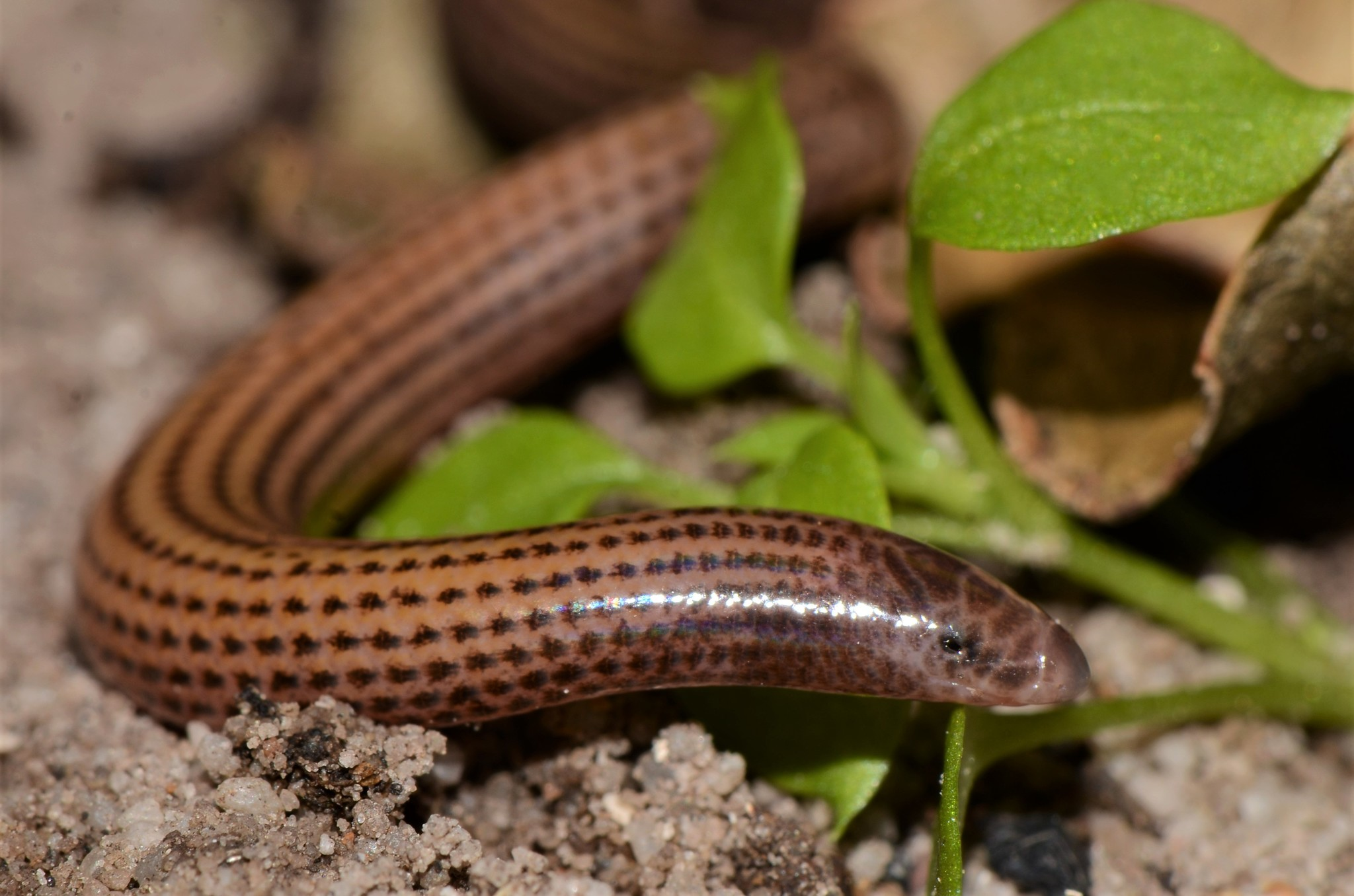

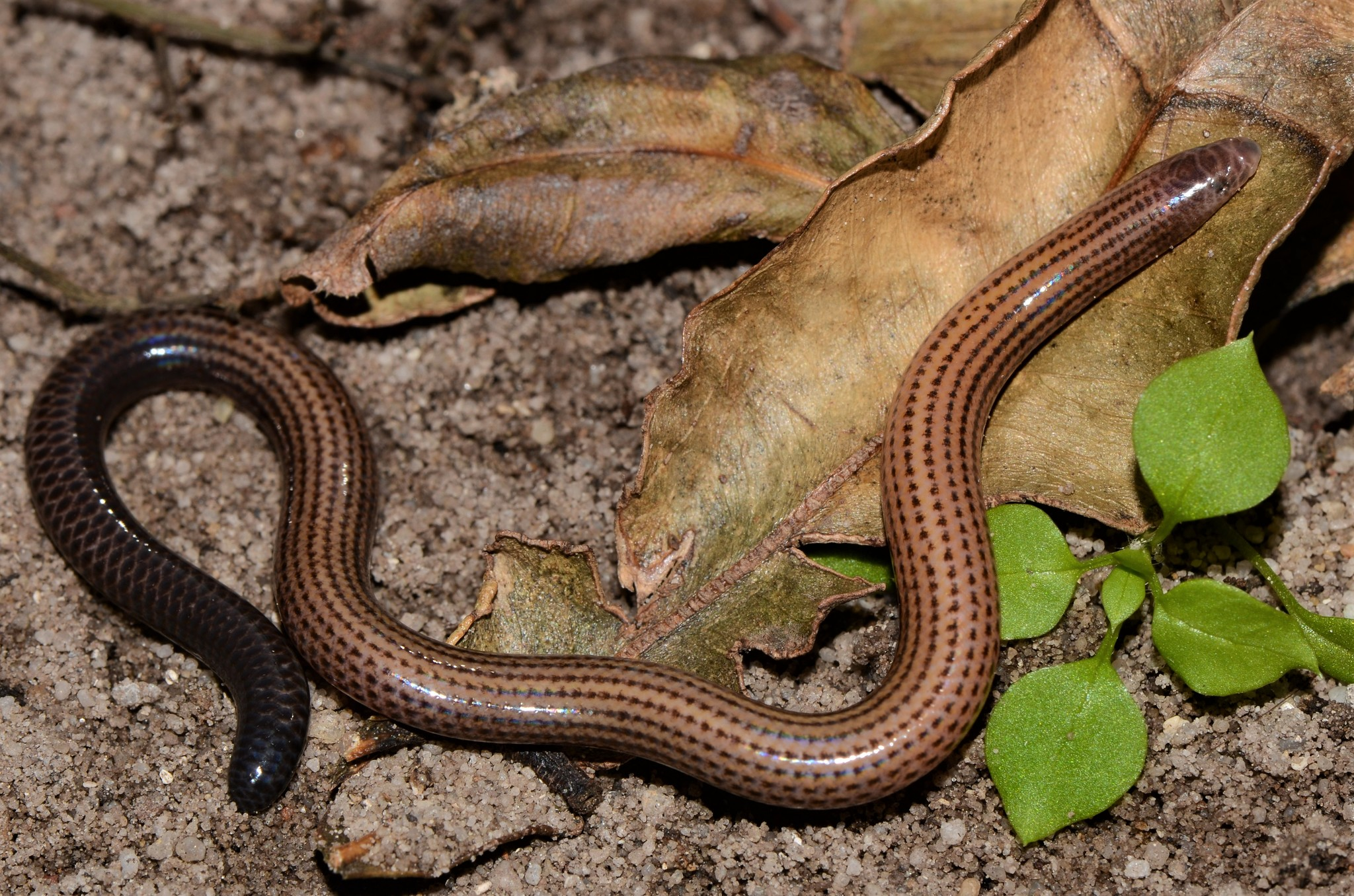

Conservation status
- Data Deficient (IUCN 3.1)

Scientific classification
- Kingdom: Animalia
- Phylum: Chordata
- Class: Reptilia
- Order: Squamata
- Family: Scincidae
- Genus: Scolecoseps
- Species: S. boulengeri

Binomial name
- Scolecoseps boulengeri Loveridge, 1920

= Scolecoseps boulengeri =

Species of reptile endemic to Mozambique

Scolecoseps boulengeri, also known commonly as Boulenger's limbless skink, is a species of lizard in the family Scincidae. The species is endemic to Mozambique.

== Etymology ==
The specific name, boulengeri, is in honor of Belgian-born British herpetologist George Albert Boulenger.

== Geographic range ==
S. boulengeri is found along the coast of Mozambique in Cabo Delgado Province and Nampula Province.

== Reproduction ==
The mode of reproduction of S. boulengeri is unknown.
