= Hyphessobrycon brumado =

Conservation status
- Least Concern (IUCN 3.1)

Scientific classification
- Kingdom: Animalia
- Phylum: Chordata
- Class: Actinopterygii
- Order: Characiformes
- Family: Acestrorhamphidae
- Genus: Hyphessobrycon
- Species: H. brumado

Binomial name
- Hyphessobrycon brumado Zanata & Camelier, 2010

Species of fish

Hyphessobrycon brumado is a species of freshwater ray-finned fish belonging to the family Acestrorhamphidae, the American characins. This fish is found in the Rio Brumado and the Rio de Contas drainage in Bahia, Brazil.

== Description ==
Hyphessobrycon brumado is a long, slender fish, similar to many of its kin. Its body is yellow-orange in color and has a blurred black stripe running down its lateral line. This stripe thickens and becomes less blurred at the tail; more apparent on males.
