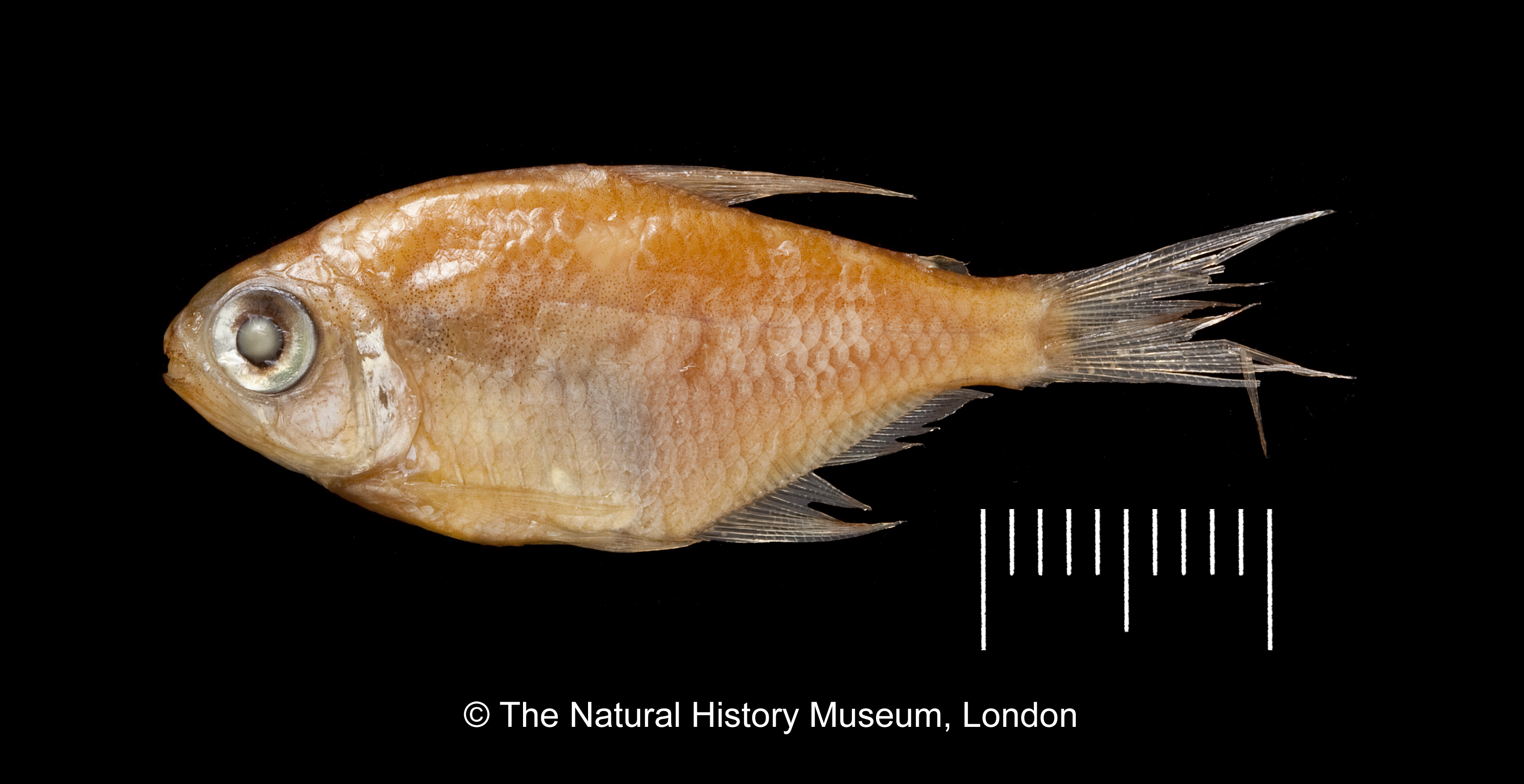
- Preserved specimen

Conservation status
- Data Deficient (IUCN 3.1)

Scientific classification
- Kingdom: Animalia
- Phylum: Chordata
- Class: Actinopterygii
- Order: Characiformes
- Family: Acestrorhamphidae
- Genus: Hyphessobrycon
- Species: H. condotensis

Binomial name
- Hyphessobrycon condotensis Regan, 1913

Synonyms
- Hyphessobrycon sebastiani García-Alzate, Román-Valencia and Taphorn, 2010

= Hyphessobrycon condotensis =

Species of fish

Hyphessobrycon condotensis is a species of freshwater ray-finned fish belonging to the family Acestrorhamphidae, the American characins. This fish is beige in coloration, with a slightly greenish hue. Just behind the gill, they exhibit a faint darker patch, similar in shape to that of the black phantom tetra. They are known to grow up to around 4 centimetres (1.6 in) in length. Their species name, condotensis, is derived from one of the waterways in which they are found, known as the Río Condoto. Hyphessobrycon condotensis is known to live in the San Juan River Basin in Colombia. As a benthopelagic fish, they reside away from the surface of the water.

== Taxonomy ==
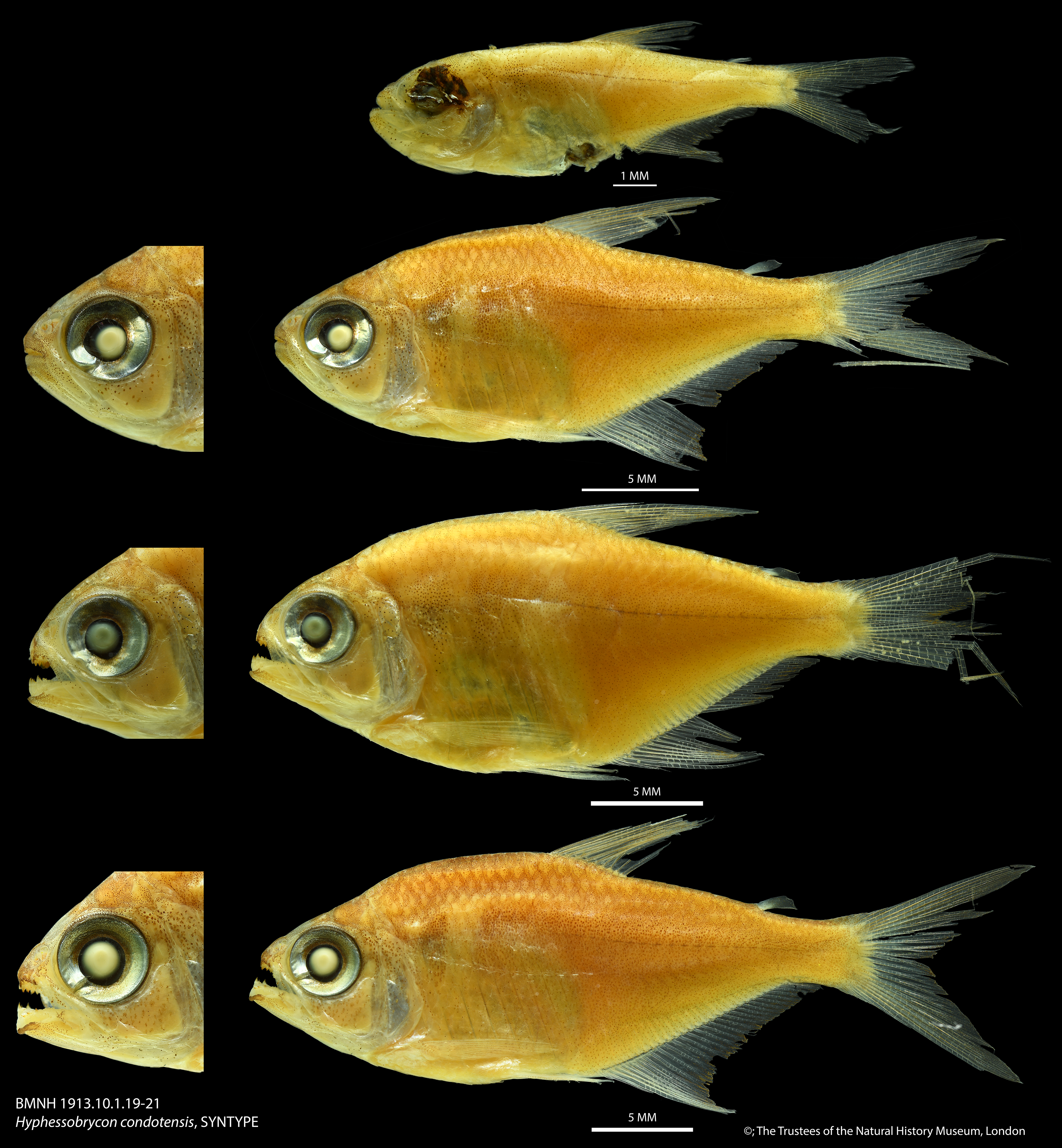
Preserved syntype specimens in the collection of the Natural History Museum, London

In 1913, British ichthyologist Charles Tate Regan published a study analysing some fish specimens kept in the Natural History Museum of London, and collected from the San Juan River of Colombia and its tributaries by Herbert George Flaxman Spurrell and G. Palmer. He discovered that three of these specimens represented a species of tetra unknown to science at the time, and gave it the scientific name Hyphessobrycon condotensis after the rio Condoto, a tributary of the San Juan River. Because Regan did not designate any one of the three specimens as a holotype, all three are considered to be syntypes, among which one (with the specimen number BMNH 1913.10.1.19) was designated as the lectotype in 2020. The validity of this species would later be questioned by other authors, with German-American ichthyologist Carl H. Eigenmann listing it as a junior synonym of Hyphessobrycon panamensis in 1922, believing that the specimens referred to by each of the two names actually represent the same species. However, ichthyologists Axel Zarske and Jacques Géry listed H. condotensis as a valid species in a 2002 paper, and another study published in 2020 further supported its validity after analysing specimens of several tetra species.

In a study published in 2010, the name Hyphessobrycon sebastiani was established for a type of tetra found in the San Juan River drainage, with the specific name chosen in honor of the younger brother of Carlos A. García-Alzate (one of the authors of the study). However, the authors did not compare the specimens they attributed to H. sebastiani with any specimens of H. condotensis. The type specimens of both species were analysed in a 2020 study which revealed that they did not differ significantly from each other, and that the two supposed species were actually a single species. Because H. condotensis was named first, H. sebastiani was declared as a junior synonym of it.
