= Hyphessobrycon catableptus =

Conservation status
- Data Deficient (IUCN 3.1)

Scientific classification
- Kingdom: Animalia
- Phylum: Chordata
- Class: Actinopterygii
- Order: Characiformes
- Family: Acestrorhamphidae
- Genus: Hyphessobrycon
- Species: H. catableptus

Binomial name
- Hyphessobrycon catableptus (Durbin, 1909)

Synonyms
- Dermatocheir catablepta Durbin, 1909

Species of fish

Hyphessobrycon catableptus is a species of freshwater ray-finned fish belonging to the family Acestrorhamphidae, the American characins. Hyphessobrycon catableptus is known to live in the Essequibo River Basin, more specifically in the Takutu and Rupununi Rivers. This fish is benthopelagic, meaning that it resides away from the surface of the water.
