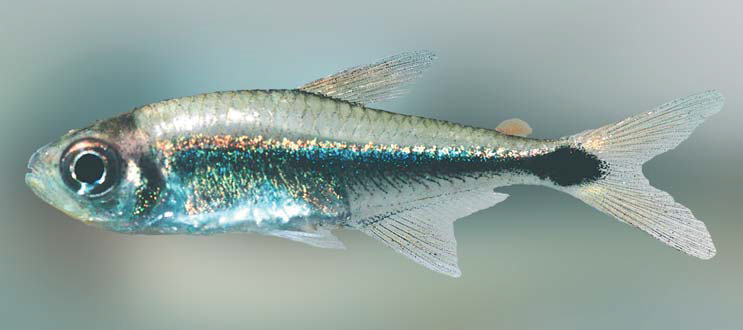

Conservation status
- Least Concern (IUCN 3.1)

Scientific classification
- Kingdom: Animalia
- Phylum: Chordata
- Class: Actinopterygii
- Order: Characiformes
- Family: Acestrorhamphidae
- Genus: Hyphessobrycon
- Species: H. borealis

Binomial name
- Hyphessobrycon borealis Zarske, Le Bail & Géry, 2006

= Hyphessobrycon borealis =

Species of fish

Hyphessobrycon borealis is a species of freshwater ray-finned fish belonging to the family Acestrorhamphidae, the American characins. This fish is found in French Guiana and Brazil.

== Distribution ==
Hyphessobrycon borealis is commonly found in French Guiana, where it has been discovered in many coastal river systems, and in Amapá in Brazil.

== Description ==
Hyphessobrycon borealis has a tail very similar to the Buenos Aires tetra, with its black patch jutting out into yellow and then turning clear. A long black line runs down its body with an iridescent black below it and an iridescent gray above it.
