= Scolecoseps acontias =

Conservation status
- Data Deficient (IUCN 3.1)

Scientific classification
- Kingdom: Animalia
- Phylum: Chordata
- Class: Reptilia
- Order: Squamata
- Family: Scincidae
- Genus: Scolecoseps
- Species: S. acontias

Binomial name
- Scolecoseps acontias (F. Werner, 1913)

Synonyms
- Melanoseps acontias F. Werner, 1913; Scolecoseps acontias — Loveridge, 1942

Species of reptile

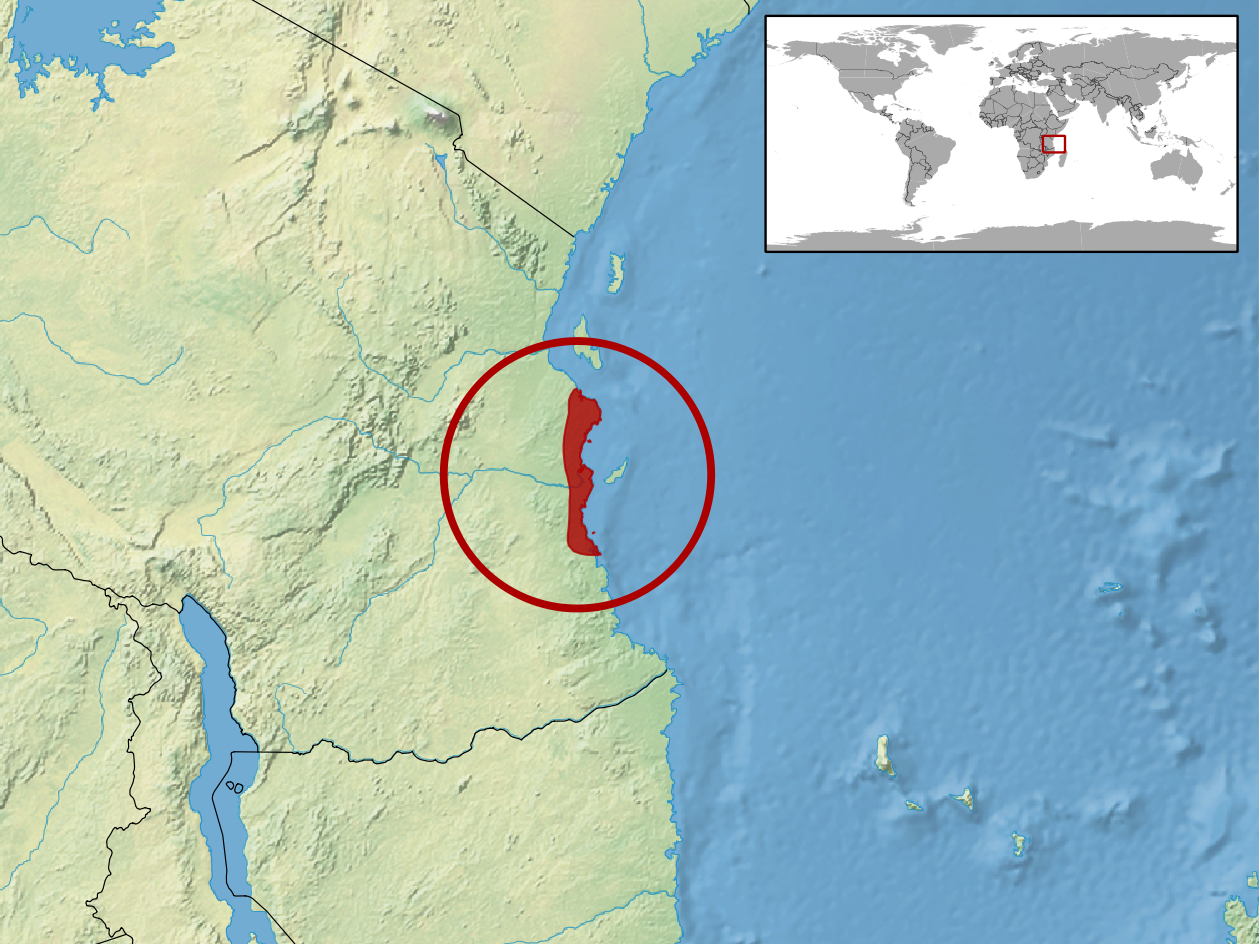
geographic distribution of Scolecoseps acontias

Scolecoseps acontias, also known commonly as the sandy limbless skink, is a species of lizard in the family Scincidae. The species is endemic to Tanzania.

== Geographic range ==
S. acontias is found in eastern coastal Tanzania.

== Habitat ==
The preferred natural habitats of S. acontias are shrubland and forest, at altitudes from sea level to 100 m (330 ft).

== Reproduction ==
S. acontias is viviparous.
