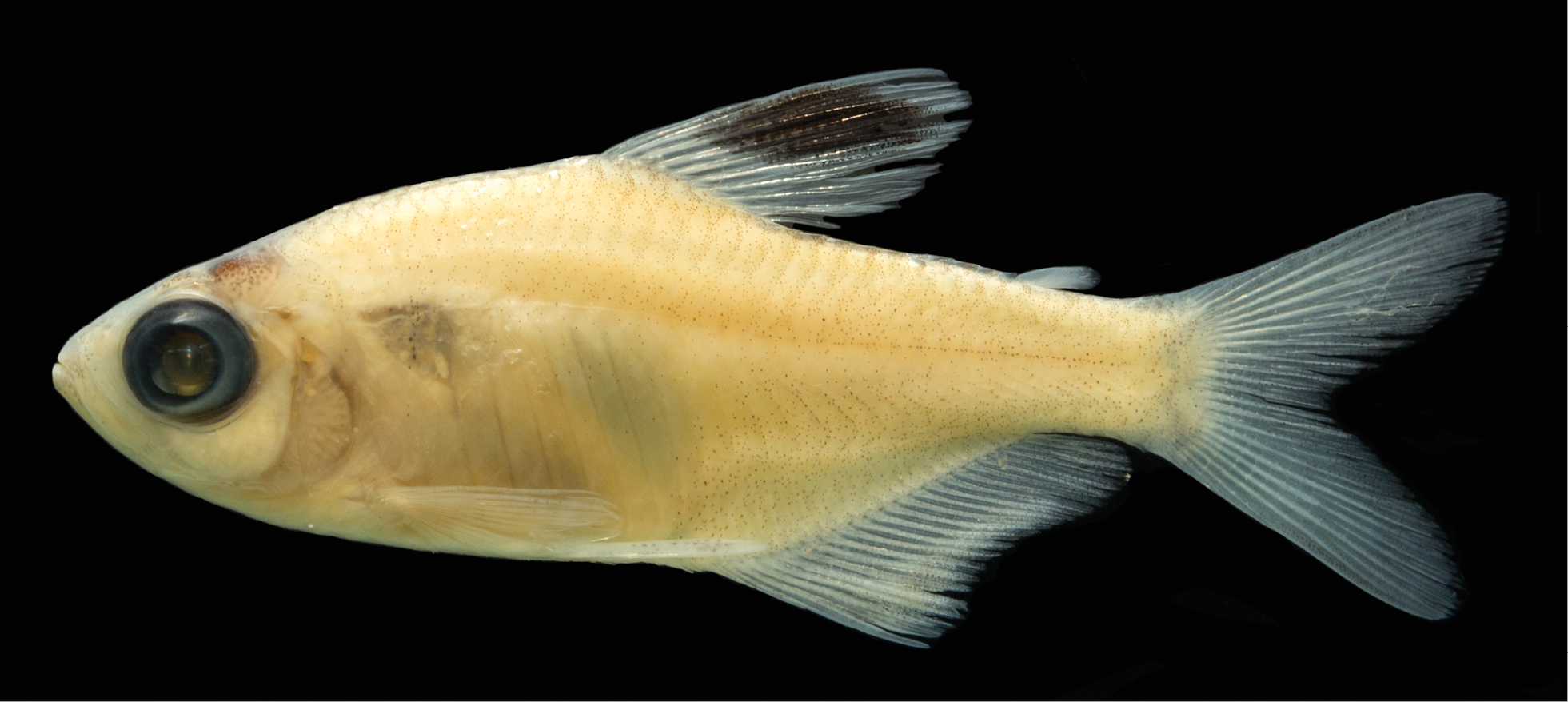

Scientific classification
- Kingdom: Animalia
- Phylum: Chordata
- Class: Actinopterygii
- Order: Characiformes
- Family: Acestrorhamphidae
- Genus: Hyphessobrycon
- Species: H. caru

Binomial name
- Hyphessobrycon caru E. C. Guimarães, Brito, Feitosa, Carvalho-Costa & Ottoni, 2019

= Hyphessobrycon caru =

Species of freshwater fish

Hyphessobrycon caru is a species of freshwater ray-finned fish belonging to the family Acestrorhamphidae, the American characins. It belongs to the Rosy-Tetra-species group and was described in 2019. The species name caru refers to the 700 km^{2} (270 sq mi) large area Caru, where the species was found. This area is inhabited by the ethnic groups Guajá and Guajajara.

== Description ==
Hyphessobrycon caru grows up to a length of 2.5 cm (0.98 in). It has a brown to black spot on his dorsal fin. Its few, irregular but vertical ordered pigment cells in its shoulder area are an important difference to related characiformes. The males, in contrast to the females, have small bone hooks at their anal and pelvis fin rays.

== Species distribution ==
The fish has only been found in the upper drainage basin of the Pindaré River, a left tributary of the rio Mearim in the federal state Maranhão in the northeast of Brazil near the Atlantic coast.
