= Trachylepis boulengeri =

Conservation status
- Least Concern (IUCN 3.1)

Scientific classification
- Kingdom: Animalia
- Phylum: Chordata
- Class: Reptilia
- Order: Squamata
- Family: Scincidae
- Genus: Trachylepis
- Species: T. boulengeri

Binomial name
- Trachylepis boulengeri (Sternfeld, 1911)

Synonyms
- Mabuia boulengeri Sternfeld, 1911; Mabuya maculilabris boulengeri — Loveridge, 1953; Mabuya boulengeri — Broadley, 1974; Euprepis boulengeri — Mausfeld et al., 2000; Trachylepis boulengeri — Bauer, 2003

Species of lizard

Trachylepis boulengeri, also known commonly as Boulenger's mabuya, is a species of skink, a lizard in the family Scincidae. The species is indigenous to southeastern Africa.

== Etymology ==
The specific name, boulengeri, is in honor of Belgian-British herpetologist George Albert Boulenger.

== Geographic range ==
T. boulengeri is found in Malawi, Mozambique, Tanzania, and Zimbabwe.

== Habitat ==
The preferred natural habitats of T. boulengeri are shrubland and savanna, at altitudes from sea level to 1,500 m (4,900 ft).

== Behavior ==
T. boulengeri is diurnal, and it is both arboreal and terrestrial.

== Diet ==
T. boulengeri preys upon insects and spiders.

== Reproduction ==
T. boulengeri is oviparous.
