= Hyphessobrycon arianae =

Conservation status
- Vulnerable (IUCN 3.1)

Scientific classification
- Kingdom: Animalia
- Phylum: Chordata
- Class: Actinopterygii
- Order: Characiformes
- Family: Acestrorhamphidae
- Genus: Hyphessobrycon
- Species: H. arianae

Binomial name
- Hyphessobrycon arianae Uj & Géry, 1989

Species of fish

Hyphessobrycon arianae is a species of freshwater ray-finned fish belonging to the family Acestrorhamphidae, the American characins. This fish is found in the Paraná River basin. It can grow to a length of about 2.5 centimetres (0.98 in).

It was named in honor of André Uj's colleague Ariane Devore.

== Sources ==
- Froese, Rainer; Pauly, Daniel (eds.). "Hyphessobrycon arianae". FishBase.
