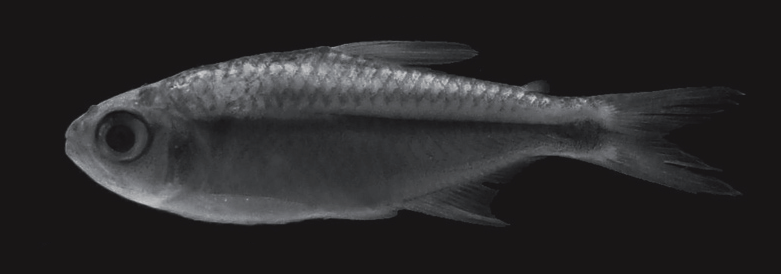

Conservation status
- Least Concern (IUCN 3.1)

Scientific classification
- Kingdom: Animalia
- Phylum: Chordata
- Class: Actinopterygii
- Order: Characiformes
- Family: Acestrorhamphidae
- Genus: Hyphessobrycon
- Species: H. acaciae

Binomial name
- Hyphessobrycon acaciae García-Alzate, Román-Valencia & Prada-Pedreros, 2010

= Hyphessobrycon acaciae =

Species of fish

Hyphessobrycon acaciae is a species of freshwater ray-finned fish belonging to the family Acestrorhamphidae, the American characins. This species is found in Colombia and Venezuela.

== Description ==
Hyphessobrycon acaciae has an overall butter-like color, with small brown areas. These fish can grow up to around 3 centimetres (1.2 in). It can be distinguished from other species in the region by a dark lateral band. Other than color, this species is similar to the Buenos Aires tetra.

A paratype specimen is held by the Ichthyology Laboratory of the University of Quindío.

== Range ==
Hyphessobrycon acaciae lives in the South American upper Orinoco River basin in the country of Colombia. This species reaches a length of 2.9 cm (1.1 in).
