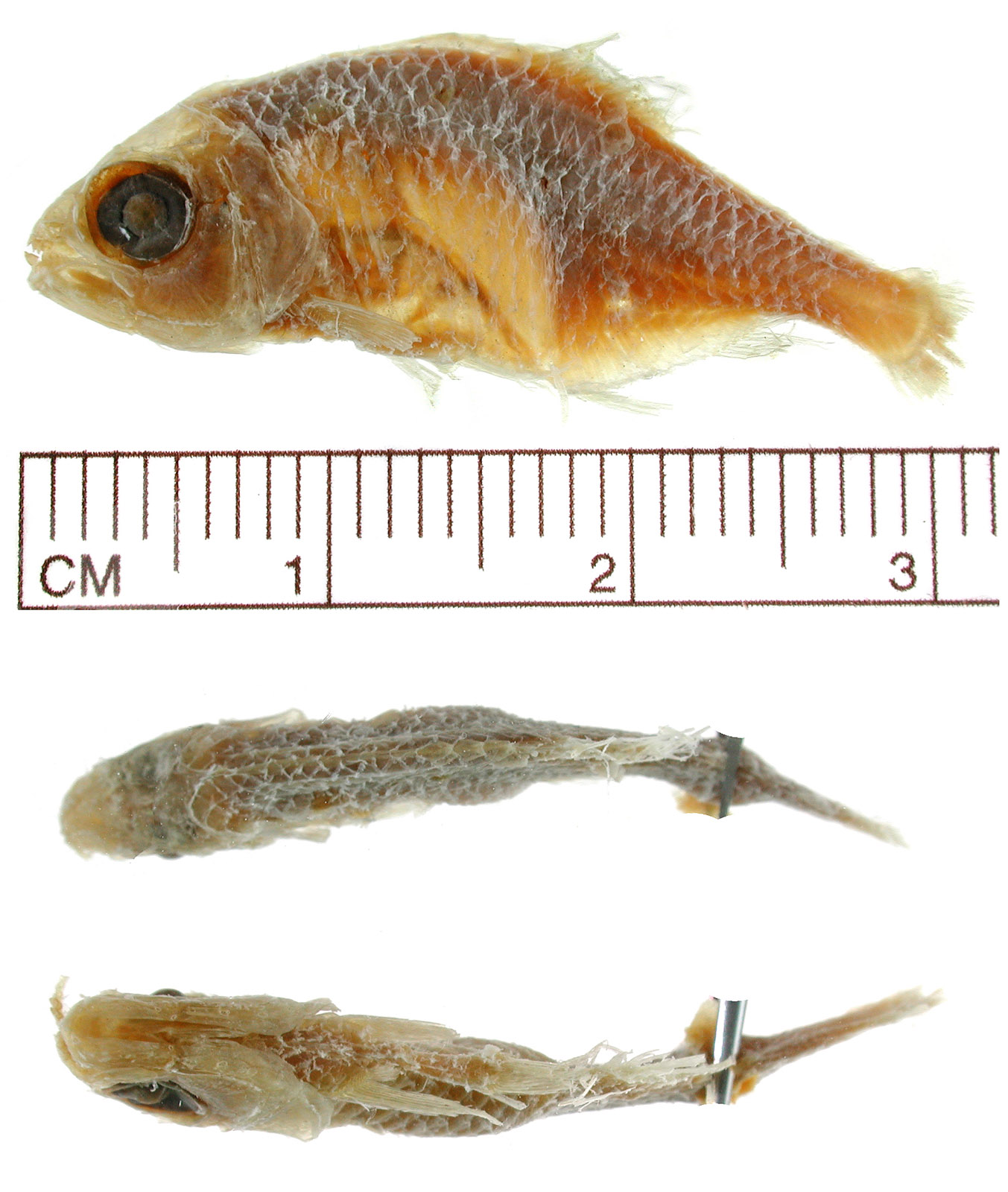

Conservation status
- Least Concern (IUCN 3.1)

Scientific classification
- Kingdom: Animalia
- Phylum: Chordata
- Class: Actinopterygii
- Order: Characiformes
- Family: Acestrorhamphidae
- Genus: Hyphessobrycon
- Species: H. boulengeri

Binomial name
- Hyphessobrycon boulengeri (C. H. Eigenmann, 1907)

Synonyms
- Hemigrammus boulengeri C. H. Eigenmann, 1907

= Hyphessobrycon boulengeri =

Species of fish

Hyphessobrycon boulengeri is a species of freshwater ray-finned fish belonging to the family Acestrorhamphidae, the American characins. This fish is found in the Brazilian states of Rio Grande do Sul, Espírito Santo, Paraná, Rio de Janeiro, Santa Catarina and São Paulo.

The fish was named in honor of ichthyologist-herpetologist George A. Boulenger (1858-1937), of the British Museum of Natural History.

== Description ==
H. boulengeri is a buff colored fish resembling other Hyphessobrycon species such as the black phantom tetra with a black patch behind the head. Its head itself is dotted brown. H. boulengeri also has yellow fin rays.
