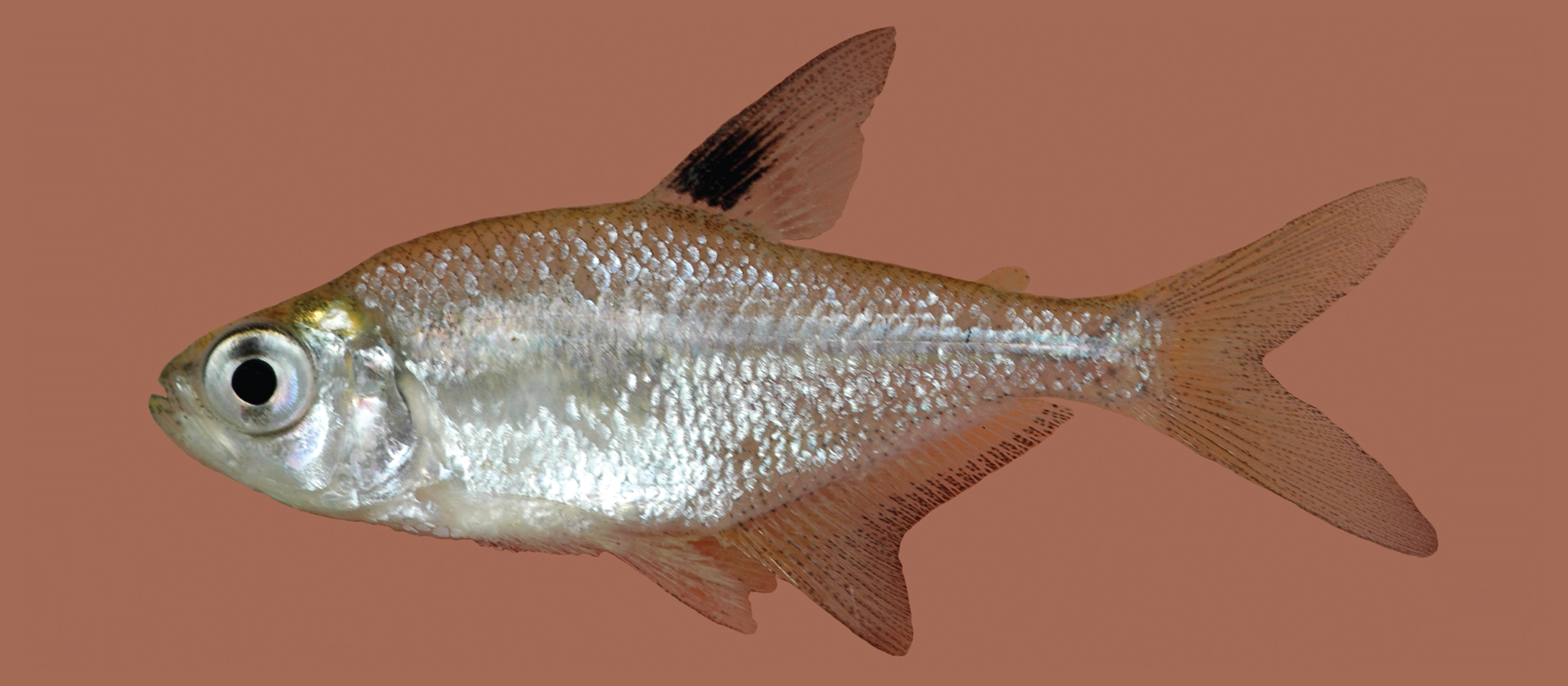

Conservation status
- Least Concern (IUCN 3.1)

Scientific classification
- Kingdom: Animalia
- Phylum: Chordata
- Class: Actinopterygii
- Order: Characiformes
- Family: Acestrorhamphidae
- Genus: Hyphessobrycon
- Species: H. compressus

Binomial name
- Hyphessobrycon compressus (Meek, 1904)

= Hyphessobrycon compressus =

Species of fish

Hyphessobrycon compressus, the Mayan tetra, is a species of freshwater ray-finned fish belonging to the family Acestrorhamphidae, the American characins. This fish is the northernmost species in the genus Hyphessobrycon, as well as its type species.

== Description ==
The Mayan tetra is a silver fish with clear fins. They express minimal sexual dimorphism, with males being slightly darker than females. The base of the dorsal fin is black in coloration. These fish are known to grow up to 4 to 4.5 centimetres (1.6 to 1.8 in) in length. It is similar in shape to the black phantom tetra, although it is slightly slimmer in appearance.

== Distribution and habitat ==
The Mayan tetra is known to inhabit the Papaloapan River Basin in southern Mexico, as well as Belize and northern Guatemala.

They live in waters ranging from 23 to 26 °C (73 to 79 °F). As a benthopelagic fish, they reside away from the surface of the water.

== Diet ==
It is presumed that the Mayan tetra is an opportunistic omnivore.
