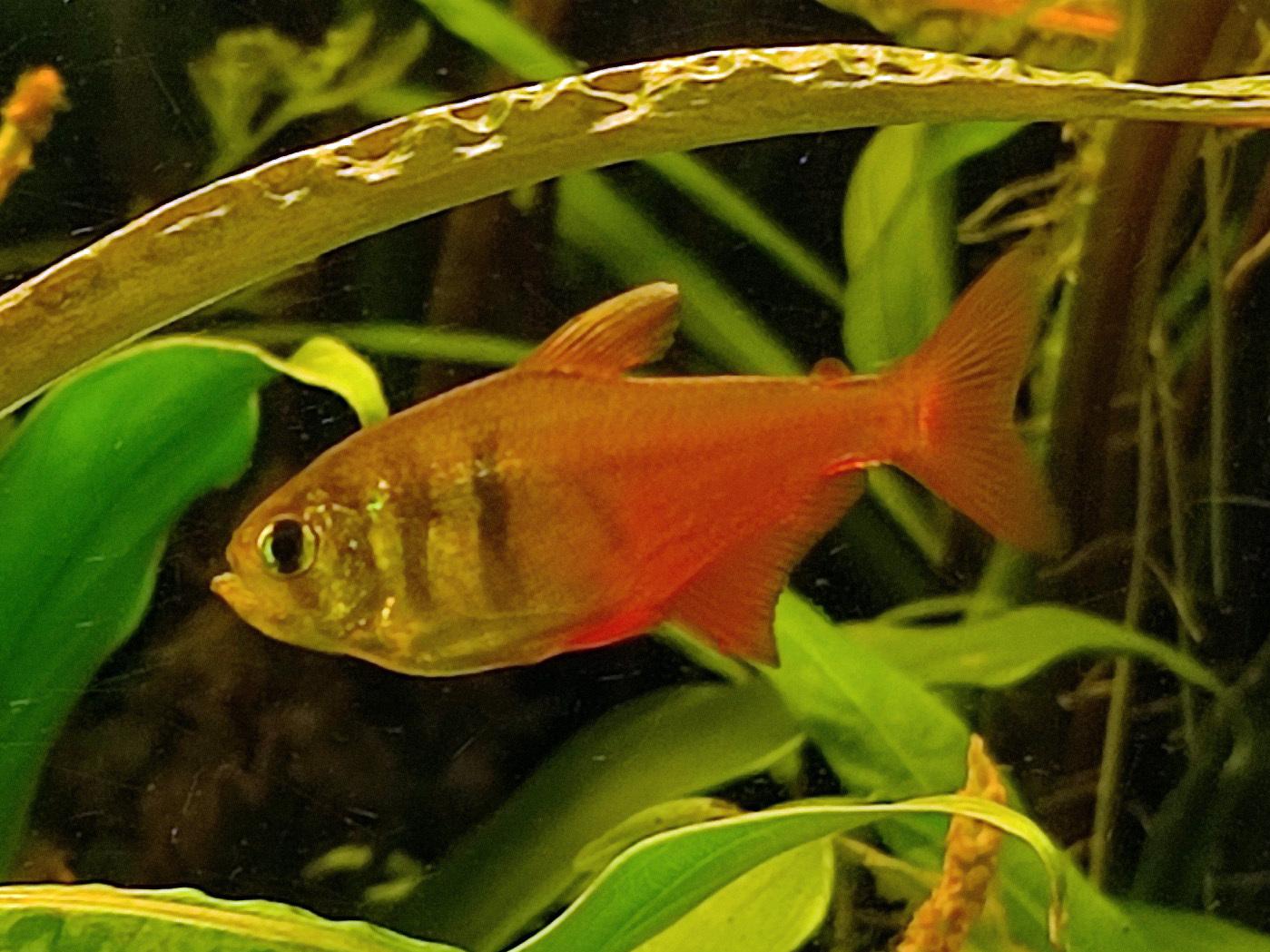

Conservation status
- Endangered (IUCN 3.1)

Scientific classification
- Kingdom: Animalia
- Phylum: Chordata
- Class: Actinopterygii
- Order: Characiformes
- Family: Acestrorhamphidae
- Genus: Hyphessobrycon
- Species: H. flammeus

Binomial name
- Hyphessobrycon flammeus Myers, 1924

= Flame tetra =

Species of fish

The flame tetra (Hyphessobrycon flammeus), also known as the red tetra or Rio tetra, is a species of freshwater ray-finned fish in the family Acestrorhamphidae, the American tetras. This fish was first introduced as an aquarium fish in 1920 by C. Bruening (of Hamburg), and was not formally described until 1924, by the American ichthyologist George S. Myers. Today, it is common in the aquarium trade and large numbers are bred in captivity, but the remaining wild population in Southeast Brazil is highly threatened.

== Description ==
The flame tetra reaches about 2.5 cm (1 in) in standard length. The rear half of the body is flame red while the area in front of the dorsal fin is silver, crossed by two dark vertical bars. All fins are red, except for the colorless pectoral fins. The tips of the anal and pelvic fins are black in males; in females, this feature is absent.

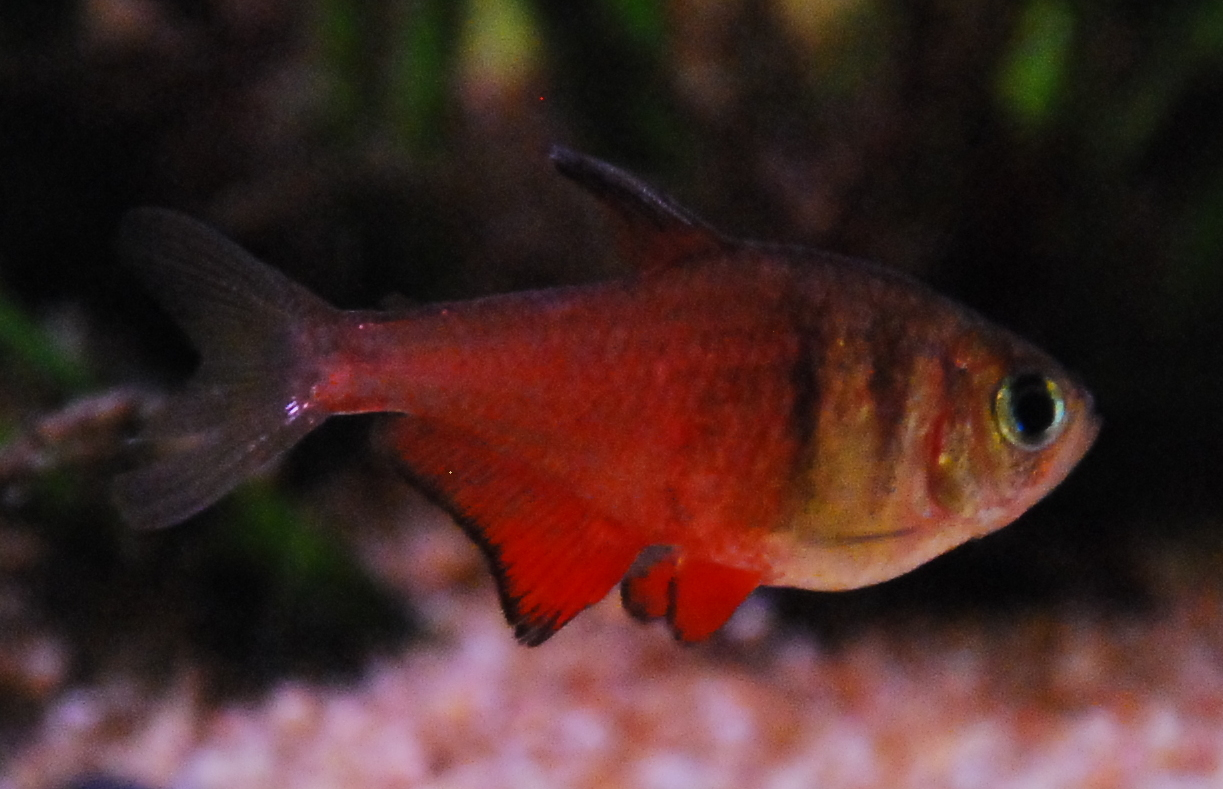
Male

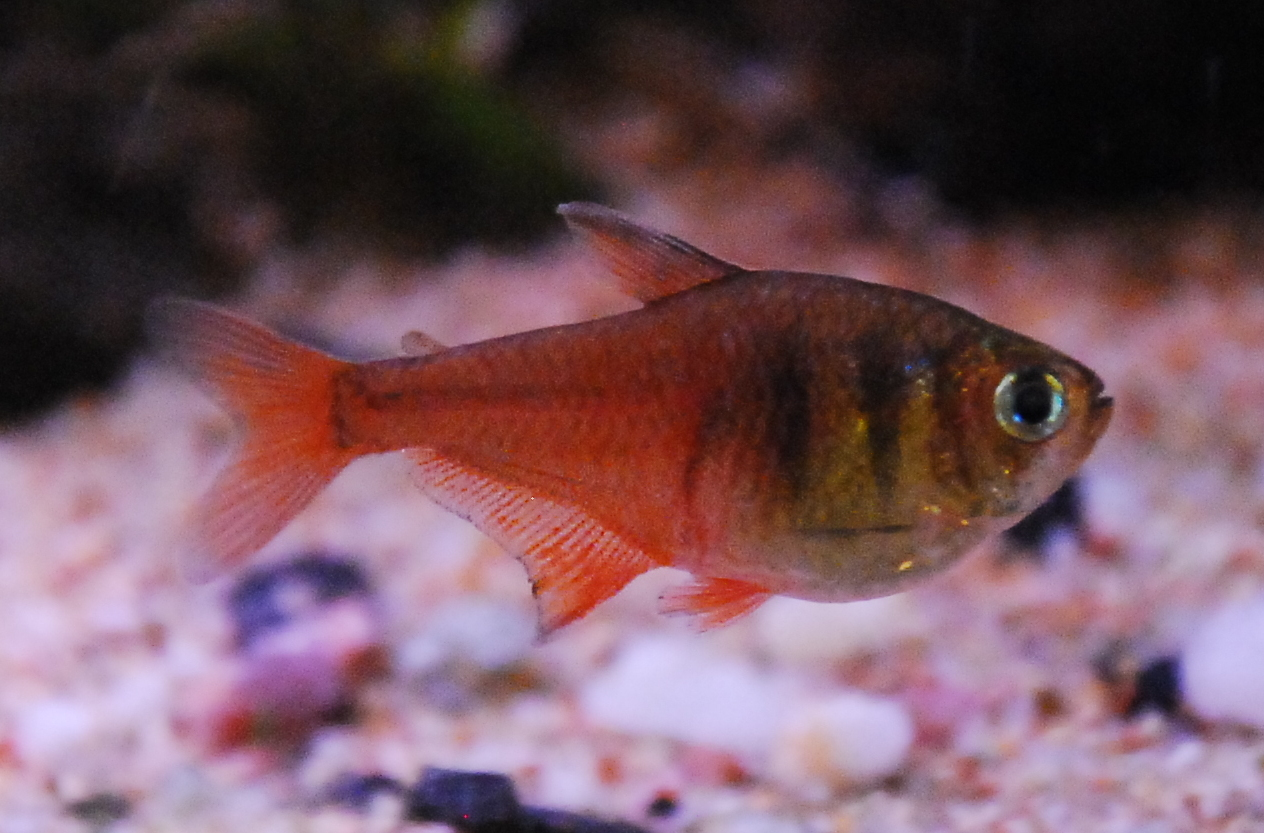
Female

== Distribution and habitat ==
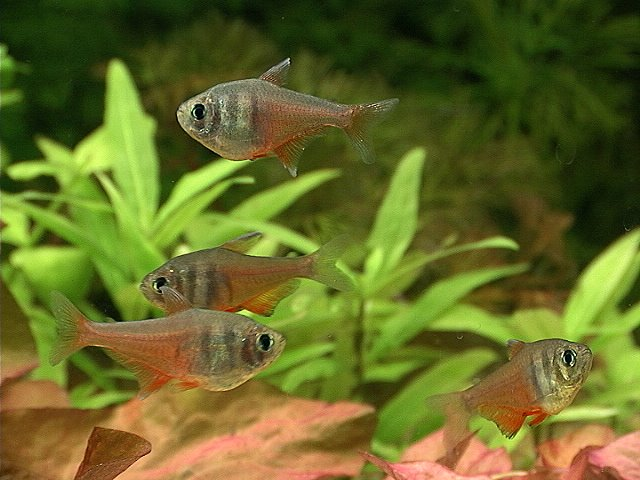
A group of flame tetras

The flame tetra is native to Southeast Brazil, where it occurs in coastal parts of Rio de Janeiro (Guanabara bay region, and Paraíba do Sul and Guandu River basins) and São Paulo (upper Tietê River basin). It lives in rivers and streams, generally preferring shallow (less than 0.5 m (1.6 ft) deep), slow-flowing sections with vegetation and a water temperature between 22–28 °C (72–82 °F).

== Ecology ==
The flame tetra is a peaceful schooling fish and an omnivore.

== Conservation status ==
The flame tetra has declined drastically, mainly because of habitat loss, pollution and introduced species (especially tilapia and black bass). Although sometimes reported as extinct in the wild, wild populations have survived, albeit perhaps not everywhere in its range; for example, the last confirmed record from Rio de Janeiro was from 1992. In its small remaining range, the flame tetra is common in the Tietê River basin (which possibly is not natural, but introduced) and rare elsewhere. Due to its decline, this species has been listed as endangered in the Brazilian national red list and in the IUCN Red List.

Today, large numbers of flame tetras are bred in captivity, mostly to support the demands of the aquarium trade. The captive-bred populations include some selectively bred forms (such as golden, orange and albino) that differ significantly from the original wild form.

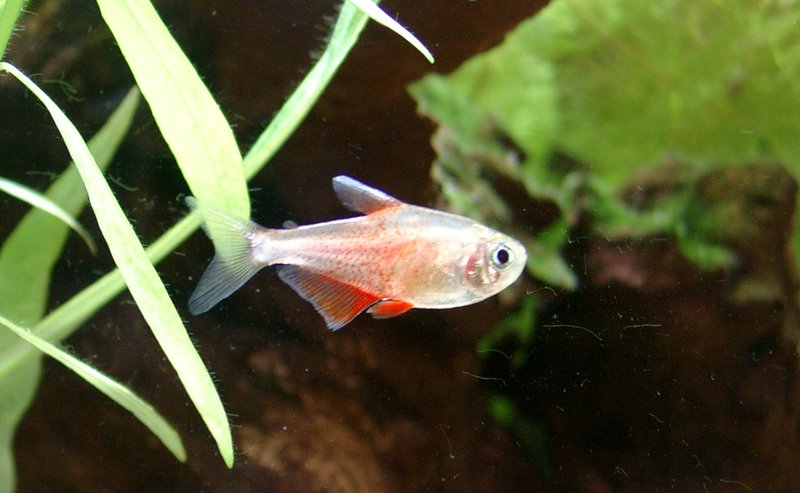
Flame tetra "orange", a selectively-bred captive variant
