= Hyphessobrycon auca =

Conservation status
- Vulnerable (IUCN 3.1)

Scientific classification
- Kingdom: Animalia
- Phylum: Chordata
- Class: Actinopterygii
- Order: Characiformes
- Family: Acestrorhamphidae
- Genus: Hyphessobrycon
- Species: H. auca

Binomial name
- Hyphessobrycon auca Almirón, Casciotta, Bechara & Ruíz Díaz, 2004

Species of fish

Hyphessobrycon auca is a species of freshwater ray-finned fish belonging to the family Acestrorhamphidae, the American characins. This fish is found in Argentina, in the Iberá Wetlands.

== Description ==
H. auca reaches a maximum length of 4.2 cm (1.7 in). The species is very similar to the Buenos Aires tetra (Psalidodon asitsi), with only subtle differences. It is slightly duller with less red on its fins and patchier black area at the base of the tail.

== Distribution and habitat ==
The species is known only from two localities, individual ponds in wetlands in the Corrientes province of northern Argentina.
