= Hyphessobrycon amapaensis =

Conservation status
- Least Concern (IUCN 3.1)

Scientific classification
- Kingdom: Animalia
- Phylum: Chordata
- Class: Actinopterygii
- Division: Teleostei
- Order: Characiformes
- Family: Acestrorhamphidae
- Genus: Hyphessobrycon
- Species: H. amapaensis

Binomial name
- Hyphessobrycon amapaensis Zarske & Géry, 1998

Species of fish

Hyphessobrycon amapaensis, the red line tetra, Amapá tetra or scarlet tetra, is a species of freshwater ray-finned fish in the family Acestrorhamphidae, the American characins. This fish is endemic to Brazil and can be found in the aquarium trade.

== Description ==
This species is similar in shape to the Buenos Aires tetra. It is a silvery fish with a red line running down the body, hence the name. Below the red line is a short yellow line and an even shorter black one. It grows to about 2.5–3 cm (0.98–1.18 in).

== Distribution and habitat ==
The species is only known from its type locality, which is a small savanna creek in the drainage of the Rio Preto. It occurs over sand and gravel bottoms.

== In the aquarium ==
This species is a peaceful community fish best kept in groups of 6 to 8. A heavily planted tank is recommended. The temperature required is 23–28 °C (73–82 °F). It is an egg-scattering fish that does not care for its young.
