= Hyphessobrycon cachimbensis =

Conservation status
- Least Concern (IUCN 3.1)

Scientific classification
- Kingdom: Animalia
- Phylum: Chordata
- Class: Actinopterygii
- Order: Characiformes
- Family: Acestrorhamphidae
- Genus: Hyphessobrycon
- Species: H. cachimbensis

Binomial name
- Hyphessobrycon cachimbensis Travassos, 1964

Species of fish

Hyphessobrycon cachimbensis is a species of freshwater ray-finned fish belonging to the family Acestrorhamphidae, the American characins. This fish is endemic to Pará in Brazil.

== Description ==
Hyphessobrycon cachimbensis has little to no markings excluding a small black spot at the base of the caudal fin. The belly of the tetra is beige in coloration, whereas the back of the fish is a darker brown color. The areas in between are golden colored. They are known to grow up to around 5 centimetres (2 in).

The species name, cachimbensis, is derived from the type locality, Cachimbo in the Serra do Cachimbo, Brazil.

== Distribution ==
Hyphessobrycon cachimbensis is known to live in the Tapajós River Basin in central Brazil. This fish is benthopelagic, meaning that it resides away from the surface of the water (suggesting that it consumes both benthic and free floating food sources).
