= George Albert Boulenger =

Belgian-British zoologist

George Albert Boulenger FRS
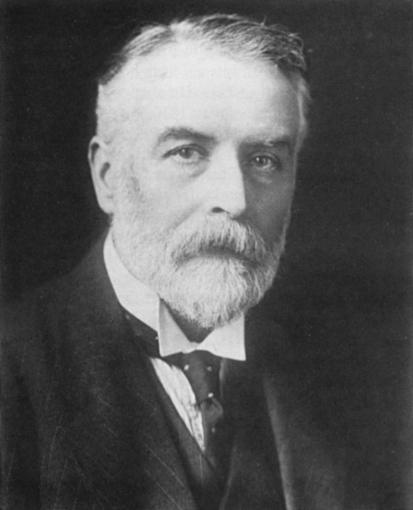
- Born: 19 October 1858; Brussels, Belgium
- Died: 23 November 1937 (aged 79); Saint Malo, France
- Education: Free University of Brussels
- Known for: Monographs on fishes, amphibians, and reptiles
- Children: Edward George Boulenger
- Parents: Gustave Boulenger (father); Juliette Piérart (mother)
- Awards: Fellow of the Royal Society, Order of Leopold (Belgium)
- Scientific career
- Fields: Zoology, botany
- Workplaces: Natural History Museum, London
- Author abbrev. (botany): Boulenger
- Author abbrev. (zoology): Boulenger

George Albert Boulenger FRS (19 October 1858 – 23 November 1937) was a Belgian-British zoologist who described and gave scientific names to over 2,000 new animal species, chiefly fish, reptiles, and amphibians. Boulenger was also an active botanist during the last 30 years of his life, especially in the study of roses.

== Early life and education ==
Boulenger was born in Brussels, Belgium, the only son of Gustave Boulenger, a Belgian public notary, and Juliette Piérart, from Valenciennes. He graduated in 1876 from the Free University of Brussels with a degree in natural sciences, and worked for a while at the Royal Belgian Institute of Natural Sciences, Brussels, as an assistant naturalist studying amphibians, reptiles, and fishes. He also made frequent visits during this time to the Muséum national d'Histoire naturelle in Paris and the British Museum in London.

== Career ==
Boulenger developed a lifelong passion for animals, which led him to study zoology at the university. During his university years, he gained recognition at the Musee d'Histoire Naturelle, Brussels and was hired as an assistant naturalist in 1880. Two years later, he joined the British Museum's Department of Zoology as a first-class assistant, under the leadership of Dr. Gunther. Boulenger held this position until his retirement in 1920.

According to biographical accounts, he was incredibly methodical and had an amazing memory that enabled him to remember every specimen and scientific name he ever saw. He also had extraordinary powers of writing, seldom made a second draft of anything he wrote, and his manuscripts showed but few corrections before going to the publisher.

Boulenger also played the violin, could speak French, German, and English apart from reading Spanish, Italian and a bit of Russian. As a zoologist, he also had a working knowledge of both Greek and Latin.

By 1921, Boulenger had published 875 papers totaling more than 5,000 pages, as well as 19 monographs on fishes, amphibians, and reptiles. The list of his publications and its index of species cover 77 printed pages.

He described 1,096 species of fish, 556 species of amphibians, and 872 species of reptiles. He was famous for his monographs on amphibians, lizards and other reptiles, and fishes, for example, his monographs on the fishes of Africa.

He was a member of the American Society of Ichthyologists and Herpetologists and was elected its first honorary member in 1935. In 1937, Belgium conferred on him the Order of Leopold, the highest honor awarded to a civilian.

== Personal life ==
His son, Edward George Boulenger (1888–1946), was also a zoologist and held the post of Director of the London Zoo Aquarium.

== Work on cave-dwelling fish ==
In 1897, King Leopold II of Belgium started to recruit naturalists to help create the Congo museum. Boulenger was named chairman for this commission.

His main discovery in 1921 was a strange fish from the Congo. It was eyeless and lacked pigmentation. He recognized it as new and unrelated to any extant epigean (eyed, surface) species of Africa. He wrote a brief paper describing this new species of cave fish, the first ever described from Africa. He called it Caecobarbus geertsii, from caeco = blind, barbus = barb, and geertsii, honoring a mysterious person, M. Geerts, who provided him with the specimen. Today, it is known as the Congo blind barb or African blind barb.

== Later life and death ==
After his retirement from the British Museum, Boulenger studied roses and published 34 papers on botanical subjects and two volumes on the roses of Europe. He died in Saint Malo, France.

== Honours ==
- 1912: Member of the Royal Academy of Science, Letters and Fine Arts of Belgium.

== Taxa described by him ==
- See Category:Taxa named by George Albert Boulenger

Boulenger described hundreds of reptile taxa; 587 species described by him are still recognised today. He also described many amphibians and fishes.

== Taxa named in his honor ==
These 26 reptile species, recognised today, bear George Boulenger's name in the specific name, as boulengeri, boulengerianus, or boulengerii :

- Agama boulengeri Lataste, 1886 – Boulenger's agama
- Anolis boulengerianus Thominot, 1887 – Tehuantepec anole
- Atractaspis boulengeri Mocquard, 1897 – Boulenger's burrowing asp

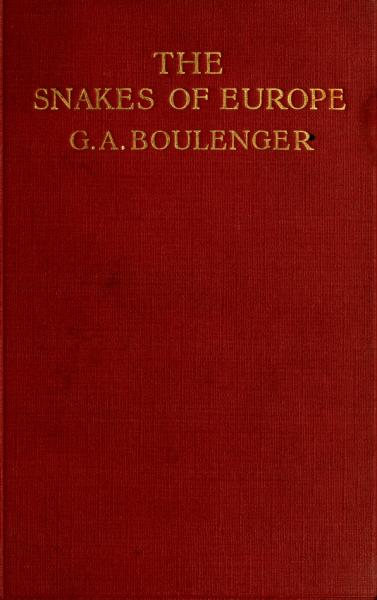
Cover of the book The Snakes of Europe

- Atractus boulengerii Peracca, 1896 – Boulenger's centipede snake
- Brachymeles boulengeri Taylor, 1922 – Boulenger's short-legged skink
- Chalcides boulengeri Anderson, 1892 – Boulenger's sand skink
- Cnemaspis boulengerii Strauch, 1887 – Con Dao rock gecko
- Compsophis boulengeri (Peracca, 1892) – Boulenger's forest snake
- Cylindrophis boulengeri Roux, 1911 – Timor pipesnake
- Dendragama boulengeri Doria, 1888 – Boulenger's tree agama
- Elapsoidea boulengeri Boettger, 1895 – Boulenger's gartersnake
- Feylinia boulengeri Chabanaud, 1917 – gabon legless skink
- Hebius boulengeri (Gressitt, 1937) – Tai-Yong keelback
- Enyalius boulengeri Etheridge, 1969 – Brazilian fathead anole
- Epacrophis boulengeri (Boettger, 1913) – Lamu blindsnake
- Gonyosoma boulengeri (Mocquard, 1897) – rhinoceros ratsnake
- Chersobius boulengeri Duerden, 1906 – Karoo padloper
- Liolaemus boulengeri Koslowsky, 1898 – Boulenger's tree lizard
- Morethia boulengeri (Ogilby, 1890) – Boulenger's snake-eyed skink
- Nucras boulengeri Neumann, 1900 – Ugandan savanna lizard
- Pareas boulengeri (Angel, 1920) – Boulenger's slug snake
- Xenoxybelis boulengeri (Procter, 1923) – southern sharp-nosed snake
- Rhampholeon boulengeri Steindachner, 1911 – Boulenger's pygmy chameleon
- Scolecoseps boulengeri Loveridge, 1920 – Moçambique legless skink
- Trachyboa boulengeri Peracca, 1910 – northern eyelash boa
- Trachylepis boulengeri (Sternfeld, 1911) – Boulenger's skink

The water cobra genus Boulengerina was named for G.A. Boulenger, but it is now treated as a subgenus of Naja containing four species: Naja annulata (water cobra), Naja christyi (Congo water cobra), Naja melanoleuca (forest cobra), and Naja multifasciata (burrowing cobra).

=== Fish species named after Boulenger ===
- Euchilichthys boulengeri Nichols & La Monte 1934
- The catfish Heterobranchus boulengeri Pellegrin, 1922
- Hyphessobrycon boulengeri (Eigenmann, 1907)
- Labeobarbus boulengeri Vreven, Musschoot, Snoeks & Schliewen, 2016
- Lepidiolamprologus boulengeri (Steindachner, 1909)
- Xenophysogobio boulengeri (T. L. Tchang, 1929) was named for Boulenger, who provided "some guidance" (translation) in the completion of Tchang's paper.

In the above lists, a binomial authority in parentheses indicates that the species was originally described in a genus other than the genus to which it is currently assigned.

=== Fish genera named after Boulenger ===
- The pike characin genus Boulengerella Eigenmann, 1903
- The cichlid genus Boulengerochromis Pellegrin, 1904
- The mormyrid genus Boulengeromyrus Taverne & Géry, 1968

== Bibliography ==
He contributed a monograph published in volume 7 of The Cambridge Natural History.

Books written by George Albert Boulenger include:

- Catalogue of the Batrachia Salientia s. Ecaudata in the Collection of the British Museum. (1882).
- Catalogue of the Lizards in the British Museum (Natural History). Second Edition. (1885, 1885, 1887). Three volumes.
- Catalogue of the Chelonians, Rhynchocephalians, and Crocodiles in the British Museum (Natural History). New Edition. (1889).
- The Fauna of British India, Including Ceylon and Burma. Reptilia and Batrachia. (1890).
- Catalogue of the Snakes in the British Museum (Natural History). (1893, 1894, 1896). Three volumes.
- The Tailless Batrachians of Europe. (1897).
- The Snakes of Europe. (1913).
