= Hyphessobrycon chiribiquete =

Scientific classification
- Kingdom: Animalia
- Phylum: Chordata
- Class: Actinopterygii
- Order: Characiformes
- Family: Acestrorhamphidae
- Genus: Hyphessobrycon
- Species: H. chiribiquete

Binomial name
- Hyphessobrycon chiribiquete García-Alzate, F. C. T. Lima, Taphorn, Mojica, Urbano‐Bonilla & Teixeira, 2020

Species of fish

Hyphessobrycon chiribiquete is a species of freshwater ray-finned fish belonging to the family Acestrorhamphidae, the American characins. This fish is green-gold in colouration. It has a black midlateral stripe running from the base of the caudal fin to the gills. The area of the caudal fin around the base is bright red in colouration, as is the anal fin. It is known to inhabit the Japurá and Ucayali River basins. It was discovered in Chiribiquete Park in Colombia.

== General references ==
- Scientists identify hundreds of species in Colombia’s Chiribiquete Park
- A new species of Hyphessobrycon Durbin (Characiformes: Characidae) from the western Amazon basin in Colombia and Peru
