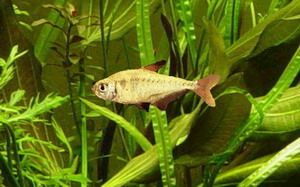

Conservation status
- Least Concern (IUCN 3.1)

Scientific classification
- Kingdom: Animalia
- Phylum: Chordata
- Class: Actinopterygii
- Order: Characiformes
- Family: Acestrorhamphidae
- Genus: Hyphessobrycon
- Species: H. bifasciatus

Binomial name
- Hyphessobrycon bifasciatus Ellis, 1911

= Hyphessobrycon bifasciatus =

Species of fish

Hyphessobrycon bifasciatus, the yellow tetra, is a species of freshwater ray-finned fish belonging to the family Acestrorhamphidae, the American characins. This fish is found in eastern Brazil.

== Etymology and description ==
Hyphessobrycon translates from Greek to "small" or "lesser bite"; bifasciatus translates from Latin to "two bars" or "bands". The yellow tetra is a small, silver fish. It is similar to the black phantom tetra. One difference is its yellow and red fins.

== Distribution ==
The yellow tetra is found around southeastern Brazil and the Paraná River basin in coastal rivers.
