= Hyphessobrycon albolineatum =

Conservation status
- Data Deficient (IUCN 3.1)

Scientific classification
- Kingdom: Animalia
- Phylum: Chordata
- Class: Actinopterygii
- Order: Characiformes
- Family: Acestrorhamphidae
- Genus: Hyphessobrycon
- Species: H. albolineatum

Binomial name
- Hyphessobrycon albolineatum Fernández-Yépez, 1950

Species of fish

Hyphessobrycon albolineatum is a species of freshwater ray-finned fish belonging to the family Acestrorhamphidae, the American characins. This fish is endemic to Venezuela.
