= Scolecoseps broadleyi =

Conservation status
- Near Threatened (IUCN 3.1)

Scientific classification
- Kingdom: Animalia
- Phylum: Chordata
- Class: Reptilia
- Order: Squamata
- Family: Scincidae
- Genus: Scolecoseps
- Species: S. broadleyi

Binomial name
- Scolecoseps broadleyi L. Verburgt, U. Verburgt & Branch, 2018

Species of reptile

Scolecoseps broadleyi is a species of lizard in the family Scincidae. The species is endemic to Mozambique.

== Etymology ==
The specific name, broadleyi, is in honor of African herpetologist Donald George Broadley.

== Geographic range ==
S. broadleyi is found in Palma District, Cabo Delgado Province, northern Mozambique.

== Habitat ==
The preferred natural habitat of S. broadleyi is coastal savanna with sandy soil and Berlinia orientalis trees.

== Reproduction ==
The mode of reproduction of S. broadleyi is unknown.
