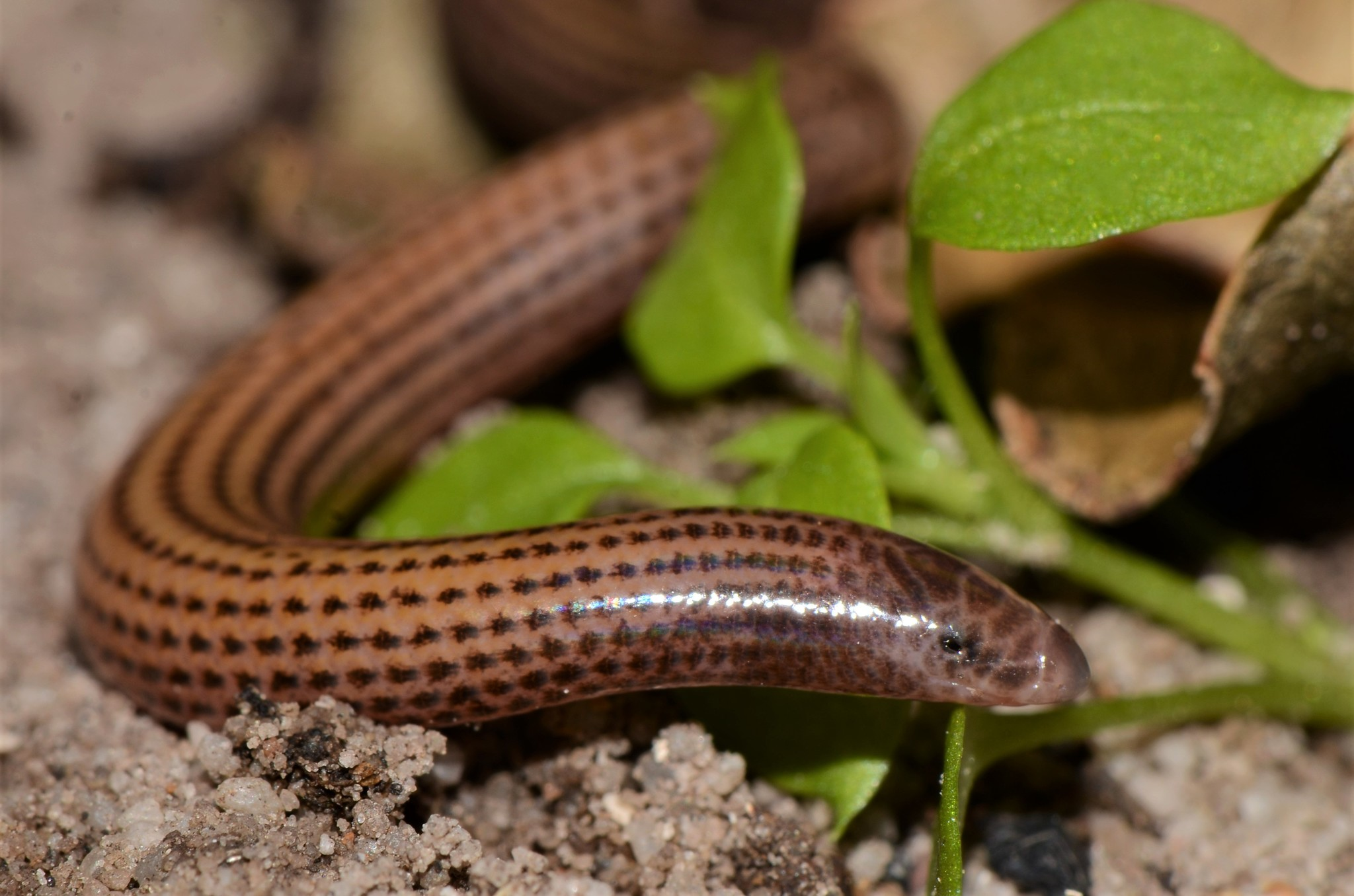
- Boulenger's Limbless Skink (Scolecoseps boulengeri)

Scientific classification
- Kingdom: Animalia
- Phylum: Chordata
- Class: Reptilia
- Order: Squamata
- Family: Scincidae
- Subfamily: Scincinae
- Genus: Scolecoseps; Loveridge, 1920

= Scolecoseps =

Genus of lizards

Scolecoseps is a genus of skinks, lizards in the family Scincidae. The genus is endemic to East Africa.

== Species ==
The genus Scolecoseps contains four species.

- Scolecoseps acontias (F. Werner, 1913) – sandy limbless skink
- Scolecoseps boulengeri Loveridge, 1920 – Boulenger's limbless skink
- Scolecoseps broadleyi L. Verburgt, U. Verburgt & Branch, 2018
- Scolecoseps litipoensis Broadley, 1995 – Litipo sand skink

Nota bene: A binomial authority in parentheses indicates that the species was originally described in a genus other than Scolecoseps.
