= Hyphessobrycon amaronensis =

Conservation status
- Data Deficient (IUCN 3.1)

Scientific classification
- Kingdom: Animalia
- Phylum: Chordata
- Class: Actinopterygii
- Order: Characiformes
- Family: Acestrorhamphidae
- Genus: Hyphessobrycon
- Species: H. amaronensis

Binomial name
- Hyphessobrycon amaronensis García-Alzate, Román-Valencia & Taphorn, 2010

Species of fish

Hyphessobrycon amaronensis is a species of freshwater ray-finned fish belonging to the family Acestrorhamphidae, the American characins. This fish is found in South America.

== Description ==
Hyphessobrycon amaronensis a small fish at about 2 to 3 centimetres (0.79 to 1.18 in). Its overall body color is a creamy yellow, along with a long brown stripe down its body.

== Distribution and habitat ==
Hyphessobrycon amaronensis lives along the equator in the South American country of Colombia. It inhabits murky waters accompanied with organic detritus. Its diet consists of algae.
