= Scolecoseps litipoensis =

Conservation status
- Data Deficient (IUCN 3.1)

Scientific classification
- Kingdom: Animalia
- Phylum: Chordata
- Class: Reptilia
- Order: Squamata
- Family: Scincidae
- Genus: Scolecoseps
- Species: S. acontias

Binomial name
- Scolecoseps acontias Broadley, 1995

Species of reptile

Scolecoseps litipoensis, also known commonly as the Litipo sand skink, is a species of lizard in the family Scincidae. The species is endemic to Tanzania.

== Geographic range ==
S. litipoensis is found in the Litipo Forest Reserve in southeastern Tanzania.

== Habitat ==
The preferred natural habitat of S. litipoensis is forest, at an altitude of 180 m (590 ft).

== Reproduction ==
The mode of reproduction of S. litipoensis is unknown.
