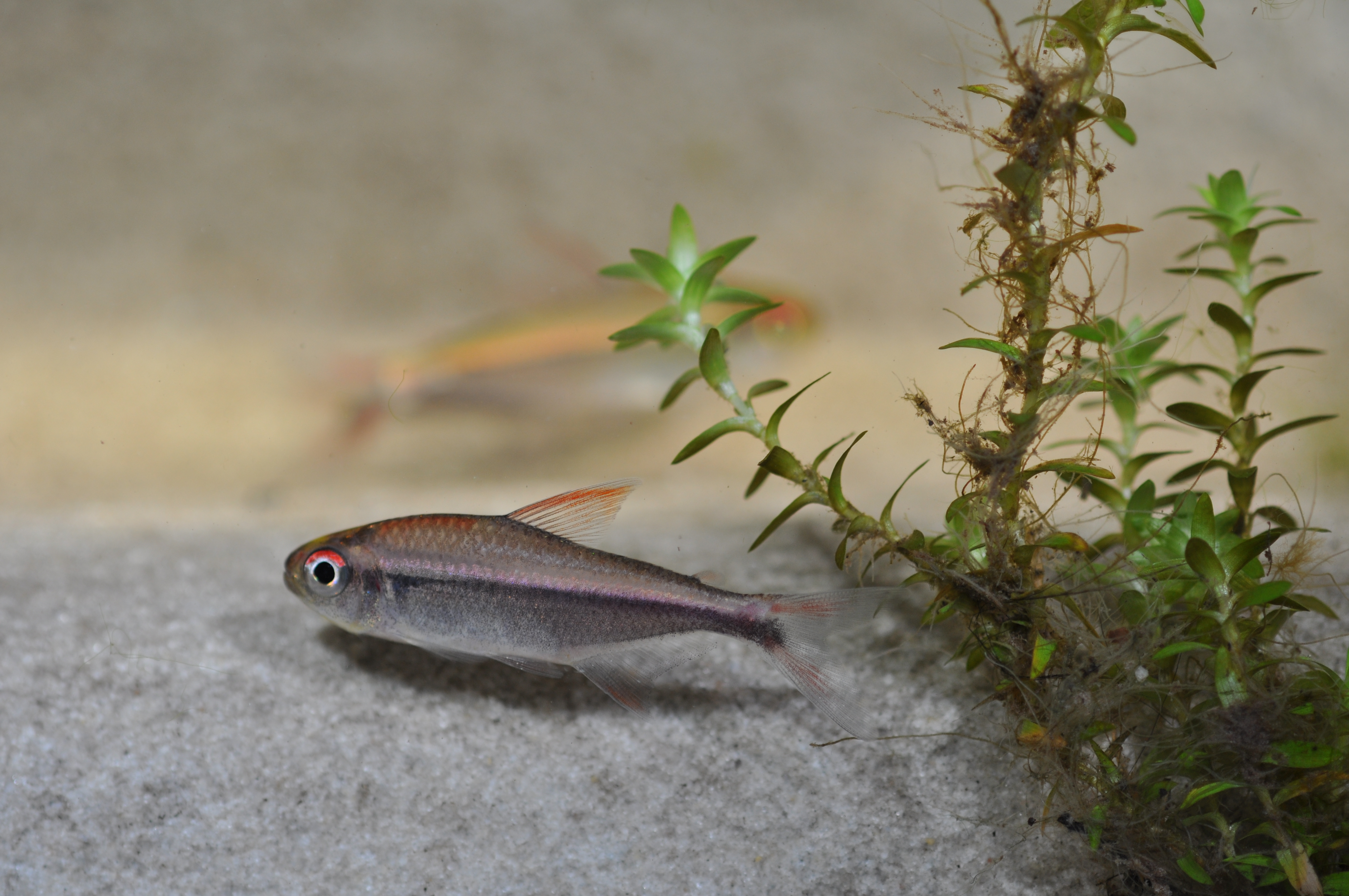

Conservation status
- Least Concern (IUCN 3.1)

Scientific classification
- Kingdom: Animalia
- Phylum: Chordata
- Class: Actinopterygii
- Order: Characiformes
- Family: Acestrorhamphidae
- Genus: Hyphessobrycon
- Species: H. agulha

Binomial name
- Hyphessobrycon agulha Fowler, 1913

= Hyphessobrycon agulha =

Species of fish

Hyphessobrycon agulha, also called the red-tailed flag tetra, is a species of freshwater ray-finned fish belonging to the family Acestrorhamphidae, the American characins. This fish is found in the basin of the Madeira River in Brazil along with parts of Peru and Bolivia. It reaches a maximum length of 4.3 centimetres (1.7 in). Though it is mainly found in the wild, it is occasionally kept by fishkeepers and is sometimes confused with the neon tetra. The fish is primarily an insectivore, though it does eat vegetable matter. It is considered to form a group with other species in Hyphessobrycon as they share a dark stripe running lengthwise.

While its name comes from the native name for this species along the Madeira River in Brazil, the fish also occurs in Colombia and Peru.
