= Cnemaspis boulengerii =

Conservation status
- Near Threatened (IUCN 3.1)

Scientific classification
- Kingdom: Animalia
- Phylum: Chordata
- Class: Reptilia
- Order: Squamata
- Suborder: Gekkota
- Family: Gekkonidae
- Genus: Cnemaspis
- Species: C. boulengerii

Binomial name
- Cnemaspis boulengerii Strauch, 1887

Synonyms
- Cnemaspis boulengerii Strauch, 1887; Gonatodes glaucus M.A. Smith, 1921; Gonatodes boulengeri [sic] — M.A. Smith, 1935; Cnemaspis boulengerii — Kluge, 1993

Species of lizard

Cnemaspis boulengerii, also known commonly as Boulenger's rock gecko or the Con Dao round eyed gecko, is a species of lizard in the family Gekkonidae. The species is endemic to Côn Sơn Island (also called Pulo Condore) in southern Vietnam.

== Etymology ==
The specific name, boulengerii, is in honor of Belgian-born British herpetologist George Albert Boulenger.

== Habitat ==
The preferred natural habitats of C. boulengerii are forest, rocky areas, and caves.

== Description ==
Dorsally, C. boulengerii is tan, with a few large roundish black spots on the shoulders and nape. Ventrally it is grayish white. The maximum recorded snout-to-vent length (SVL) is 6.9 cm (2.7 in). The tail is about 10% longer than SVL.

== Reproduction ==
C. boulengerii is oviparous.
