= Anolis boulengerianus =

Conservation status
- Data Deficient (IUCN 3.1)

Scientific classification
- Kingdom: Animalia
- Phylum: Chordata
- Class: Reptilia
- Order: Squamata
- Suborder: Iguania
- Family: Dactyloidae
- Genus: Anolis
- Species: A. boulengerianus

Binomial name
- Anolis boulengerianus Thominot, 1887

Synonyms
- Anolis boulengerianus Thominot, 1887; Anolis nebulosus — Barbour, 1934 (part); Anolis isthmicus Fitch, 1978; Norops isthmicus — Liner, 1994; Anolis boulengerianus — G. Köhler et al., 2014

Species of lizard

Anolis boulengerianus, also known commonly as the Tehuantepec anole, is a species of lizard in the family Dactyloidae. The species is endemic to the Mexican state of Oaxaca.

== Etymology ==
The specific name, boulengerianus, is in honor of Belgian-born British herpetologist George Albert Boulenger.

== Geographic range ==
A. boulengerianus is found in southeastern Oaxaca.

== Habitat ==
The preferred natural habitat of A. boulengerianus is forest.

== Description ==
Moderate-sized for its genus, A. boulengerianus may attain a snout-to-vent length of 5.6 cm (2.2 in) in males. Females are about 10% smaller.

== Reproduction ==
A. boulengerianus is oviparous.
