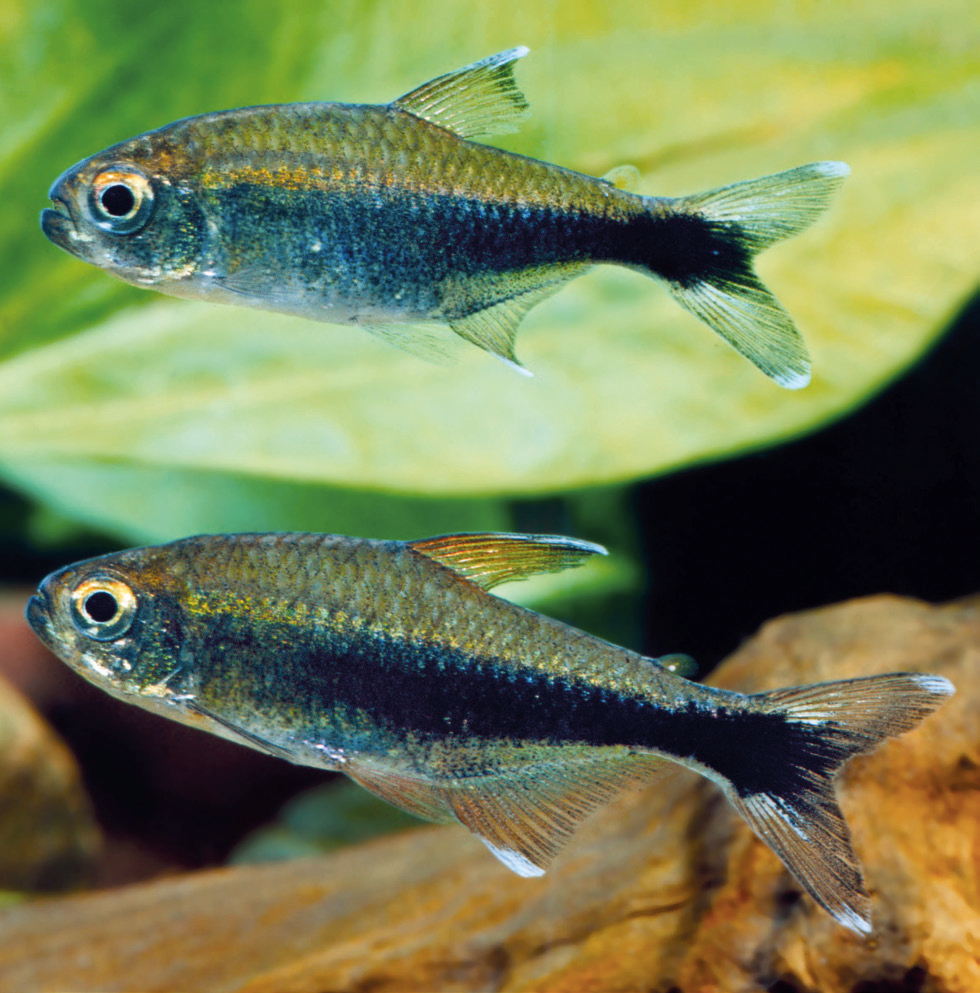

Scientific classification
- Kingdom: Animalia
- Phylum: Chordata
- Class: Actinopterygii
- Order: Characiformes
- Family: Acestrorhamphidae
- Genus: Hyphessobrycon
- Species: H. clavatus

Binomial name
- Hyphessobrycon clavatus Zarske, 2015

= Hyphessobrycon clavatus =

Species of fish

Hyphessobrycon clavatus is a species of freshwater ray-finned fish belonging to the family Acestrorhamphidae, the American characins. This fish is a pale golden green colour, with its belly being even paler. It has an orange midlateral line. Below the midlateral line is a thick black stripe that fades around the gills. Their fins have white tips. They are known to reach about 3 centimeters (1.2 inches) in length. Its species name, clavatus, is derived from the Latin term clava lat, meaning club-shaped. Hyphessobrycon clavatus is known to inhabit the waters of Peru. As a pelagic fish, they swim near the surface of the water. They have seen limited use in the fish trade.
