= Hyphessobrycon axelrodi =

Conservation status
- Near Threatened (IUCN 3.1)

Scientific classification
- Kingdom: Animalia
- Phylum: Chordata
- Class: Actinopterygii
- Order: Characiformes
- Family: Acestrorhamphidae
- Genus: Hyphessobrycon
- Species: H. axelrodi

Binomial name
- Hyphessobrycon axelrodi (Travassos, 1959)

Synonyms
- Aphyocharax axelrodi Travassos, 1959; Megalamphodus cf. axelrodi Travassos, 1959

Species of fish

Hyphessobrycon axelrodi, the Calypso tetra, is a species of freshwater ray-finned fish belonging to the family Acestrorhamphidae, the American characins. This fish is found in Trinidad & Tobago.

It was named in honor of pet-book publisher Herbert R. Axelrod (1927–2017), who collected the type specimen.

== Description ==
Hyphessobrycon axelrodi is a small, iridescent, silver fish with white-tipped dorsal, anal and pelvic fins. It also has a red tail. Females are duller, with faint gray-tipped fins and a dull pink tail.

== Distribution ==
Hyphessobrycon axelrodi is endemic to the island of Trinidad. It inhabits low elevations in fresh and brackish waters near swampy areas.
