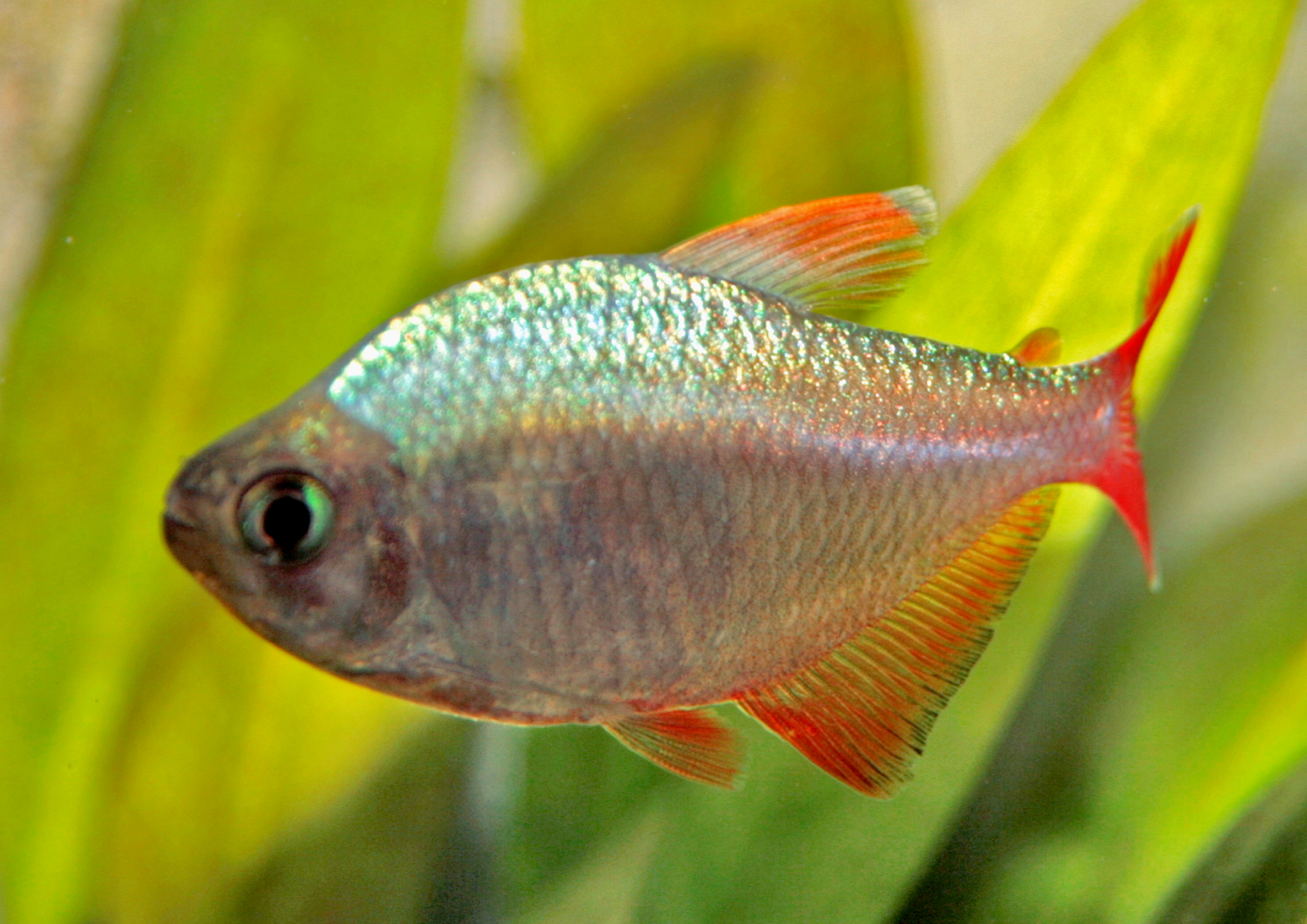

Conservation status
- Data Deficient (IUCN 3.1)

Scientific classification
- Kingdom: Animalia
- Phylum: Chordata
- Class: Actinopterygii
- Order: Characiformes
- Family: Acestrorhamphidae
- Genus: Hyphessobrycon
- Species: H. columbianus

Binomial name
- Hyphessobrycon columbianus Zarske & Géry, 2002

= Hyphessobrycon columbianus =

Colombian tetra

Species of fish

Hyphessobrycon columbianus, the Colombian tetra or blue-red Colombian tetra, is a species of freshwater ray-finned fish belonging to the family Acestrorhamphidae, the American characins. It is native to the Acandi River near Acandí) in northwestern Colombia. The Colombian tetra's habitat tends to be slow-flowing creeks and tributaries.

Only recently introduced to the aquarium trade, it is one of the more expensive tetras. They will generally get on with most other aquarium fish and will shoal with other types of tetra. However, they have been observed to harass smaller fish on occasions.

== Taxonomy ==
Prior to 2002, live individuals of Hyphessobrycon columbianus had already been known to aquarium hobbyists and kept in captivity for over five years under the name "blue-red Colombian tetra", but the scientific name of this fish had not been determined. It was initially thought to be a member of Astyanax or Moenkhausia, and was later considered a variant of either Hyphessobrycon ecuadoriensis or Hyphessobrycon panamensis. However, a study by ichthyologists Axel Zarske and Jacques Géry was published that year based on analysis of several captive-bred individuals and two wild individuals caught in 1995 in the Acandi River near Acandí, Colombia. They determined that this fish is a species of Hyphessobrycon that had not yet been scientifically described, and gave it the specific name columbianus in reference to its country of origin. Both of the wild-caught specimens were sent to the State Museum of Zoology, Dresden, and one (given the specimen number MTD F 25 497) was designated as the holotype of the species, while the other (given the specimen number MTD F 25 498) was designated as a paratype specimen.

== Description ==
Growing to about 6.5 cm (2.6 in) in total length, the Colombian tetra is silver-grey in colour. It has a turquoise blue tinge of increasing intensity from the lateral line upwards, which becomes a prominent stripe across the anterior dorsal ridge. The fins are predominantly scarlet red but the colour will fade as the fish rests. The anal fin is usually edged with black, and both dorsal and caudal fins have whitish tips. It resembles Hyphessobrycon ecuadorensis from western Ecuador, and prior to the description of H. columbianus in 2002, the latter had generally been confused with the former.

== In the aquarium ==
The Colombian tetra is generally a hardy, adaptable fish and has a lifespan of 3 to 5 years. It eats all common aquarium foods such as flake food, frozen and freeze-dried foods and small live foods. They prefer neutral or slightly acidic water at around 24–26 °C (75–79 °F). The recommended tank volume is about 30 US gallons (114 L). Although they have been known to harass other fish, the likelihood of this happening is greatly reduced if they are kept in groups of six or more, preferably 10. The Colombian tetra can be bred in a similar way to other species in the genus.
