= George S. Myers =

American ichthyologist

George Sprague Myers (February 2, 1905 – November 4, 1985) was an American ichthyologist who spent most of his career at Stanford University. He served as the editor of Stanford Ichthyological Bulletin as well as president of the American Society of Ichthyologists and Herpetologists. Myers was also head of the Division of Fishes at the United States National Museum, and held a position as an ichthyologist for the United States Fish and Wildlife Service. He was also an advisor in fisheries and ichthyology to the Brazilian Government.

He was a prolific writer of papers and books and is well known to aquarists as the man who first described numerous popular aquarium species such as the flame tetra (Hyphessobrycon flammeus), the black-winged hatchetfish (Carnegiella marthae), the ram cichlid (Microgeophagus ramirezi) and, most notably, the neon tetra. He also erected the genera Aphyosemion and Fundulopanchax, which include dozens of widely kept killifish species. He is perhaps best known to aquarists for his collaborations with William T. Innes who wrote the book Exotic Aquarium Fishes. Myers served as the scientific consultant for this seminal work in the aquarium literature and, after Innes retired, served as the editor for later editions. When Myers described the neon tetra in 1936, he named it Hyphessobrycon innesi in honor of Innes. The species was later moved to the genus Paracheirodon and is now known as Paracheirodon innesi.

He was an ichthyologist with the 1938 Allan Hancock Pacific Expedition. He participated as a biologist in the U.S. Navy's 1947 Bikini Scientific Resurvey.

Myers worked closely with fellow ichthyologist and Stanford Natural History Museum curator, Margaret Hamilton Storey.

== Taxon named in his honor ==
In the scientific field of herpetology his major interest was amphibians.

- A genus of Philippine snake, Myersophis, was named in his honor by Edward Harrison Taylor in 1963.
- A genus of South Pacific lizards, Geomyersia, was named in his honor by Allen E. Greer and Fred Parker in 1968.
- Chionodraco myersi, the Myers's icefish, is a species of marine ray-finned fish belonging to the family Channichthyidae, the crocodile icefishes. It is found in the Southern Ocean.
- The San Marcos gambusia (Gambusia georgei) C. Hubbs & Peden, 1969 is a likely extinct species of Gambusia from the family Poeciliidae that was found only in the San Marcos Springs of Central Texas. The fish has not been seen since 1983.
- Hypostomus myersi is a species of catfish in the family Loricariidae. It is native to South America, where it occurs in the basins of the Iguazu River and the Urugua-í River.
- The gargoyle cusk, Xyelacyba myersi is a species of cusk-eel from the subfamily Neobythitinae of the family Ophidiidae.
- Bascanichthys myersi is an eel in the family Ophichthidae (worm/snake eels)

== Taxon described by him ==
- See Category:Taxa named by George S. Myers
