= Liolaemus boulengeri =

Conservation status
- Least Concern (IUCN 3.1)

Scientific classification
- Kingdom: Animalia
- Phylum: Chordata
- Class: Reptilia
- Order: Squamata
- Suborder: Iguania
- Family: Liolaemidae
- Genus: Liolaemus
- Species: L. boulengeri

Binomial name
- Liolaemus boulengeri Koslowsky, 1898

Synonyms
- Liolaemus boulengeri Koslowsky, 1898; Liolaemus micropholis F. Werner, 1910; Liolaemus (Eulaemus) boulengeri — J. Schulte et al., 2000

Species of lizard

Liolaemus boulengeri, also known commonly as Boulenger's tree iguana, is a species of lizard in the family Liolaemidae. The species is endemic to Argentina.

== Etymology ==
The specific name, boulengeri, is in honor of Belgian-born British herpetologist George Albert Boulenger.

== Geographic range ==
L. boulengeri is found central Argentina in the provinces of Chubut, Mendoza, Neuquén, and Santa Cruz.

== Habitat ==
The preferred natural habitats of L. boulengeri are grassland and shrubland, at altitudes of 400–1,600 m (1,300–5,200 ft).

== Behavior ==
L. boulengeri is terrestrial.

== Diet ==
L. boulengeri preys upon insects.

== Reproduction ==
L. boulengeri is oviparous.
