= Marion Durbin Ellis =

American entomologist and ichthyologist

- Born: October 25, 1887; Los Angeles, California
- Died: December 16, 1972 (aged 85); Los Angeles, California
- Citizenship: United States of America
- Education: Indiana University Bloomington
- Spouse: Max Mapes Ellis
- Scientific career
- Fields: Ichthyology Entomology
- Workplaces: University of Michigan Biological Station; U.S. Bureau of Fisheries

Marion Durbin Ellis (born Marion Lee Durbin; October 25, 1887 – December 16, 1972) was an American ichthyologist and entomologist. She is credited with erecting Hyphessobrycon and with conducting the most comprehensive study to date of the Hemigrammus genus of fish.

== Early life ==
Marion Lee Durbin was born in Los Angeles to David Henry and Cornelia (Fitch) Durbin. She graduated high school from Anderson High School in Indiana. She attended Earlham College from 1905 to 1906 and then earned her A.B. degree in 1909 from Indiana University where she was a member of Delta Gamma sorority, and Sigma Xi honorary society. She married Max Mapes Ellis in September of that year. She earned her A.M. degree from Indiana University in 1910. During her time at IU she studied under Carl H. Eigenmann and Charles Zeleny.

== Career ==
In 1908, Dr. Eigenmann turned over some fish samples he had taken from British Guyana that he found very perplexing. The then-named Ms. Durbin was able to identify a new genus and twelve new species of Tetragonopterid characins.

After graduating from IU, the family moved to Boulder, Colorado where she worked with Theodore Dru Alison Cockerell. They made the first scientific observations of Claytonia rosea in 1913.

By 1914, she was the Dean of Women at the University of Michigan Biological Station where her husband was also on staff. In 1925, she moved with her husband to Fairport, Iowa where they worked at the U.S. Bureau of Fisheries lab and studied mussel reproduction.

In 1930, Cockerell used her as one of two examples in an article in Nature about how the scientific community needed to fix citations for women who publish work before and after a name change.

== Personal ==
Ellis had her only child, Cornelia Grace, in October 1914. She was a member of the Indiana Academy of Science, the Society of Friends, and was in favor of women's suffrage. She died in Los Angeles in 1972.

=== Eponyms ===
She is commemorated in the scientific names of a number of species, including:

- Bryconacidnus ellisi Pearson, 1924
- Bryconops durbini (Eigenmann, 1908)
- Corydoras ellisae Gosline, 1940
- Hemigrammus durbinae Ota, Lima & Pavanelli, 2015
- Hyphessobrycon ellisae Bragança, Ottoni & Rangel-Pereira, 2015
- Psalidodon marionae (Eigenmann, 1911)

== Lost work ==
In the late 1990s, historian Philip Scarpino had arranged with the University of Missouri to inspect Max and Marion Ellis's equipment and papers which had been stored in the attic of a science building. Unfortunately, when he arrived he found that everything had been discarded. Anyone finding more of these records, pertinent to the history of mussels and the U.S. Bureau of Fisheries, should contact the D.C. Booth Historic National Fish Hatchery in Spearfish, South Dakota so that the records may be preserved.

== Publications ==
- Durbin, M.L. 1909. A New Genus and Twelve New Species of Tetragonopterid Characins. Annals of the Carnegie Museum; vol. 6: 148–183.
- Durbin, M.L. 1909. An Analysis of the Rate of Regeneration Throughout the Regenerative Process. The Journal of Experimental Zoology; vol. 7; no. 3
- Ellis, M.D. 1911. On the species of Hasemania, Hyphessobrycon, and Hemigrammus collected by J.D. Haseman for the Carnegie Museum. Annals of the Carnegie Museum 8(1): 148–183, pls. 1–3.
- Ellis, M.D. 1911. The Plated Nematognaths. Annals of the Carnegie Museum 8(1): 384–413, pls. 1–3.
- Durbin, M.L. 1914. New bees of the genus Halictus (Hym.) from United States, Guatemala and Ecuador. In: Journal of The New York Entomological Society 22: 218–223.
- Ellis, M.M., and M.D. Ellis. "Growth and Transformation of Parasitic Glochidia in Physiological Nutrient Solutions." Science 64 No. 1667 (1926): 579–80.
- Ellis, M. M., Amanda D. Merrick, and Marion D. Ellis. "The Blood of North American Fresh Water Mussels Under Normal and Adverse Conditions." Bulletin of the Bureau of Fisheries 46 (1930): 509–542. [also identified as Bureau of Fisheries Doc. No. 1097].
- Ellis, M.M., B.A. Westfall, and M.D. Ellis. "Determination of Water Quality." Fish and Wildlife Service Research Report No. 9, pp. 1–122, 1946.

== See also ==
- See Category:Taxa named by Marion Durbin Ellis
