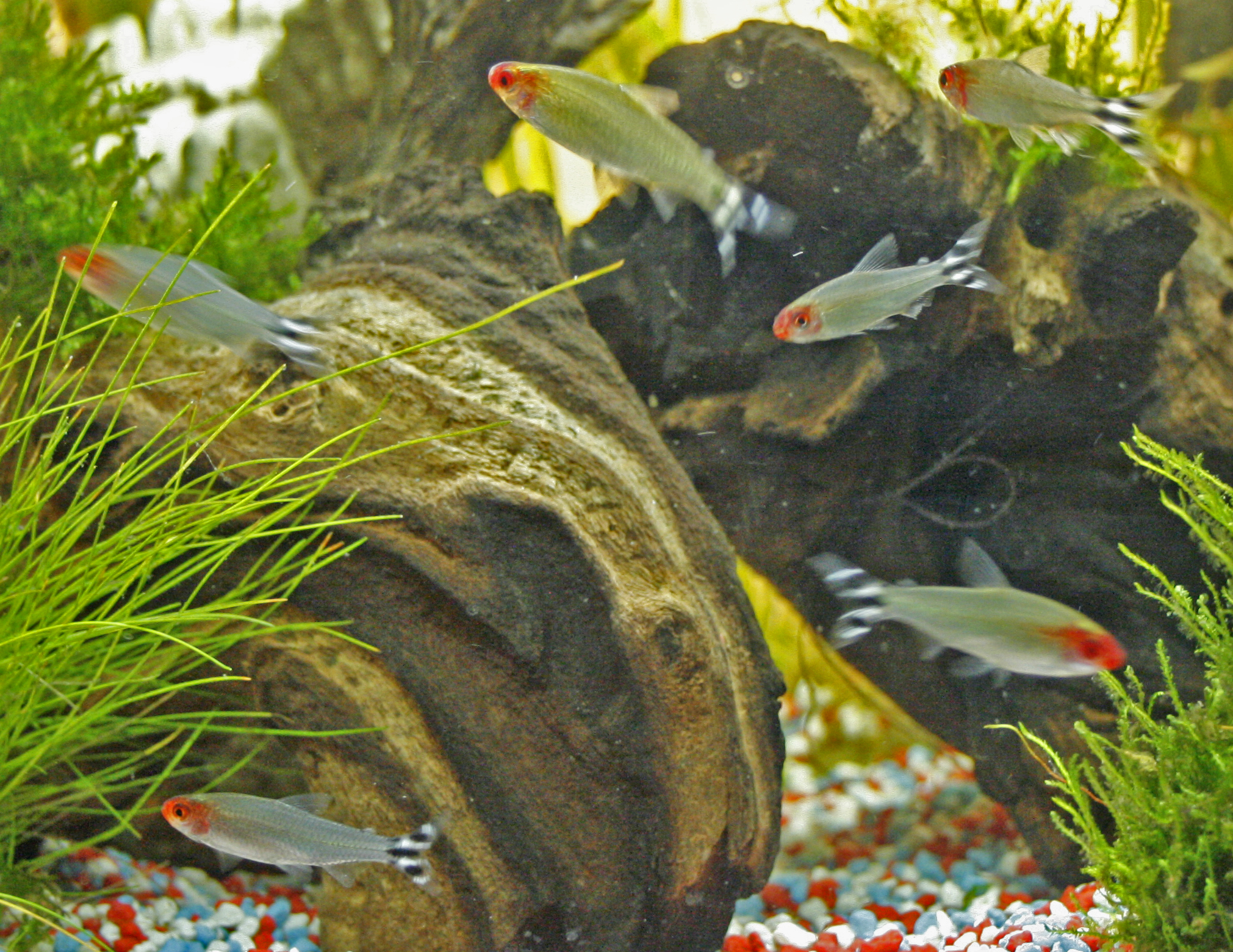

Conservation status
- Least Concern (IUCN 3.1)

Scientific classification
- Kingdom: Animalia
- Phylum: Chordata
- Class: Actinopterygii
- Order: Characiformes
- Family: Acestrorhamphidae
- Subfamily: Megalamphodinae
- Genus: Petitella
- Species: P. rhodostoma

Binomial name
- Petitella rhodostoma (C. G. E. Ahl, 1924)

Synonyms
- Hemigrammus rhodostomus Ahl, 1924

= Rummy-nose tetra =

Species of fish

The rummy-nose tetra (Petitella rhodostoma), also known as the rednose tetra, is a species of freshwater ray-finned fish belonging to the family Acestrorhamphidae, the American characins. This species occurs in South America, where it is restricted to the lower basin of the Amazon in Brazil. This is a popular species in the aquarium hobby.

== Taxonomy ==
The rummy-nose tetra was first formally described as Hemigrammus rhodostomus in 1924 by the German zoologist Ernst Ahl, with its type locality given as the Rio Tapajoz, near Santarem in Pará, Brazil. In 2020, this species was reclassified in the formerly monospecific genus Petitella, as a molecular phylogenetic study found that it was sister to the false rummy-nose tetra (P. georgiae). The genus Petitella belongs to the subfamily Megalamphodinae, the red tetras, within the American tetra family, Acestrorhamphidae. This family is classified within the suborder Characoidei of the order Characiformes.

== Etymology ==
The rummy-nose tetra is classified in the genus Petitella. This name suffixes the Latin diminutive -ella onto the surname of the French zoologist and anatomist Georges Petit, who was director of the Laboratoire Arago in France. The specific name, rhodostoma, is derived from the Greek rhodon, a "rose", and stóma, which means "mouth" — an allusion to the red colour around the nose and mouth.

== Description ==
The rummy-nose tetra has a maximum total length of 5.0 cm (2.0 in). It has a fusiform body shape, whose basal body colour is a translucent silvery colour suffused in some specimens with a greenish tint: iridescent green scales are frequently seen adorning the fish at the point where the fontanel meets the body. The fins are hyaline, with the exception of the caudal fin. This fin is adorned with black and white horizontal stripes, variable in number, but usually comprising one central black stripe in the central portion of the tail fin, with two horizontal black stripes upon each caudal fin lobe. The spaces between the stripes are white, the total count of black stripes is five, or occasionally three; however, whether these features are reliable determinants of species identity has yet to be fully ascertained. The head is a deep red colour, iridescent in lustre, with the red continuing into the iris of the eye, and some red colouration extends beyond the operculum into the anterior-most section of the body proper.

Male and female individuals exhibit no obvious visual differences, other than increased fullness of the body outline in ripe females.

== Distribution and habitat ==
The rummy-nose tetra is found in South America, where it is endemic to Brazil's Pará state in the Amazon basin. Records from the Orinoco are thought to refer to P. bleheri. This species is found in river stretches whose water chemistry is mineral-deficient (soft), acidic, and frequently tainted with humic acid decay products from leaf litter upon the river substrates (known as 'blackwaters' because of their appearance). Aquatic plants are sometimes present in these stretches of water, though the upper reaches of the Rio Negro are less densely populated with aquatic flora than the other rivers due to shading from the rainforest canopy. The fishes preferentially inhabit the middle and mid-lower water regions. The fish prefer darker waters, as there is evidence of the eggs and fry being light sensitive.

== Aquarium maintenance ==
The details of aquarium maintenance for all three species are more or less identical: the rummy-nose tetra is a schooling fish, which exhibits tight schooling behaviour both in the wild and in the aquarium. Consequently, these fishes should be maintained in groups of no fewer than six individuals, with larger numbers being preferable where space permits; these tetras prefer about a 25 gallon/80 litre aquarium. All three species are lovers of warm aquarium water, the temperature range for maintenance being 24 to 31 °C (75 to 88 °F), with the fishes sometimes requiring temperatures as high as 33 °C (91 °F) for breeding. Consequently, compatibility of these fishes with cooler water fishes is contra-indicated: for example, panda corydoras would be a bad choice of companion, as these fishes prefer lower temperatures, and there is little overlap in the temperature ranges of the two species. Many fish can be kept with rummy-nose tetras, some including smaller gourami, other tetras, barbs, danios, Australian rainbows, and various catfish, such as Ancistrus. The rummy-nose tetra cannot be kept with other popular ornamental fishes, such as African cichlids, as they require very different water parameters.

The water chemistry preferred by these fishes, as might be inferred readily from that of the wild habitat, is soft, acidic water (hardness no higher than 6° dH and pH around 6.4–7.0 is preferred). However, for maintenance purposes, the pH of the aquarium water can range from 5.6 to 7.4. However, if captive reproduction is to be attempted, the rummy-nose tetra needs soft, acidic water. A planted aquarium is welcomed by these fishes, particularly if the plants include fine-leaved species such as Cabomba and Myriophyllum.

Feeding presents relatively few problems, as the fishes will eagerly devour a range of prepared as well as live fish foods. However, if they have a flake or pellet-based diet, a treat once or twice a week is recommended to give the diet variety. In common with numerous other tetras, these fishes are particularly fond of live bloodworms (the aquatic larvae of a midge belonging to the genus Chironomus) and will also devour live Daphnia avidly. Unlike those tetra species which adapt to surface feeding in the aquarium, rummy-nose tetras are not considered likely to add live mosquito larvae to their diet in the aquarium, though instances where these fishes discover and enjoy this food are possible. Usually, rummy-nose tetras prefer to take their foods in the middle and lower regions of the aquarium.

Lifespan for the rummy-nose tetra in the aquarium is usually five to six years with careful maintenance. Exceptional specimens can live for more than eight years.

The fish is interesting in that it can act as a "mine canary" in an aquarium, alerting the aquarist to potential pollution problems in an aquarium. When levels of certain metabolic wastes (ammonia, nitrites and nitrates) exceed critical levels, the intense ruby-red colour of the fish's facial area becomes pale. The fishes also become pale in appearance immediately after the disturbance that takes place in the aquarium following a water change, but in this instance, once clean water has been supplied, the intense deep red colour returns. Persistent paleness of the head is to be taken as a sign that water chemistry parameters in the maintenance aquarium are in need of adjustment, and that pollutant levels are becoming dangerous for the inhabitants.

== Reproduction ==
Rummy-nose tetras present serious challenges even to experienced aquarists from the standpoint of breeding, primarily due to two factors: the likelihood of sterility ensuing if the prospective parents are maintained in water with too high a level of dissolved calcium ions, and the slow growth rate of the fry. An additional problem is that gender differentiation is difficult by visual inspection alone, making pair selection partly a matter of luck unless an obviously gravid female is available for selection. Again, identical remarks apply to all three species listed above.

The breeding aquarium for the rummy-nose tetra, in addition, needs to be sterilised prior to use, as the fish produces eggs that are notoriously sensitive to bacterial and fungal infection. Use of an antifungal agent is strongly advised once spawning is completed in order to prevent various fungi from attacking the eggs.

Needless to say, given the above remarks about likely sterility if the fishes are maintained in water whose chemical parameters are incorrect, prospective parents must be maintained in soft, acidic water throughout their lives if they are to remain capable of reproduction. Failure to do so will destroy any chances of success from the very start. Furthermore, it is highly advisable to filter the water of the breeding aquarium over peat, or alternatively use one of the commercially available 'Blackwater Tonic' additives to provide the necessary chemical environment conducive to reproduction. Parent fishes should, in addition, be conditioned heavily with copious live foods to bring them into prime breeding condition.

Though the fishes prefer to spawn among fine leaved plants, one problem that the aquarist faces in this regard is that the majority of fine leaved plants available in the aquarium prefer high light levels (Cabomba is a particular case in point) while the rummy-nose tetra prefers to spawn under subdued lighting conditions. Workarounds for this include the use of Java moss (a plant that thrives even in very low light levels, and is an ideal spawning medium for many fishes) or the use of synthetic alternatives ("spawning mops" made of nylon are typically deployed where a suitable natural plant is unavailable).

The parents should be introduced to the breeding aquarium up to seven days before spawning, fed heavily with live foods, and kept under subdued lighting. In addition, the parents tend to prefer to spawn under quiet conditions, and thus the aquarium should be sited away from areas of busy human traffic. The temperature should be slowly raised to 32 °C (90 °F), and sometimes 33 °C (91 °F) may be needed, depending upon the individual specimens. Spawning is difficult to observe, taking place as it does under subdued lighting, and while chase sequences followed by the adoption of a side-by-side position by the parents amid the provided spawning media may be taken as indication that spawning is indeed taking place, this is by no means certain. The judicious use of a low-power flashlight to observe spawning may be helpful in determining if eggs are actually being produced.

The species is not noted as a particularly egregious egg eater (unlike, for example, the lemon tetra) but it is still advisable to remove the parents once spawning is completed. At this stage, antifungal agents to protect the eggs should be added, and indeed are vital in the case of this difficult, sensitive species.

Once spawning is completed, it is advisable to keep the aquarium under dim lighting conditions until the eggs have hatched and the fry are free-swimming. While rummy-nose tetras do not need their eggs to be kept in total darkness as is the case for neon and cardinal tetras, the eggs are known to exhibit some degree of photosensitivity, and subdued lighting is highly advisable during egg development in the breeding aquarium.

== Development ==
Fertile rummy-nose tetra eggs take approximately 72 to 96 hours to hatch at 32 °C (90 °F). The fry spend a further 24 to 48 hours absorbing the yolk sac, whereupon they become free-swimming. At this stage, the fry should be fed with infusoria or a special egglayer fry food, and frequent partial water changes (around 10% of the aquarium volume every 24 to 48 hours) initiated.

Having overcome the challenge of persuading the fishes to spawn, the aquarist soon discovers that the rummy-nose tetra presents another hurdle to successful captive reproduction—the fry are among the slowest growing of all characins, and indeed among the slowest-growing of all popular aquarium fishes. Infusoria and other similar foods are required for the fry for a minimum of three weeks, and it is not unknown for the fishes to take as long as twelve weeks to migrate to larger foods, growth rates being particularly sensitive to temperature. Success at raising fry to a size where they are capable of taking larger food morsels is much more likely to be achieved if the fry are kept at temperatures above 30 °C for the first 3 months of life: even then, attrition rates due to the appearance of diseases among the fishes (most frequently bacterial infections) can be severe.

It can take as long as 6 months to raise fry to juvenile sizes where they are capable of eating live daphnia on a regular basis. During this time, they are likely to be sensitive to sudden changes in water chemistry, and managing pollutants in the fry aquarium is made all the more difficult by the need to maintain low mineral content in the aquarium water during development in order to prevent sterility affecting the fishes—the buffering capacity of the aquarium is likely to be low as a result of the low concentration of bicarbonate ions that is needed in addition to the low concentration of calcium ions. Taking all of these factors into account, the fish is a major breeding challenge for the aquarist, and success may depend at least partly upon luck.

== See also ==
- List of freshwater aquarium fish species
