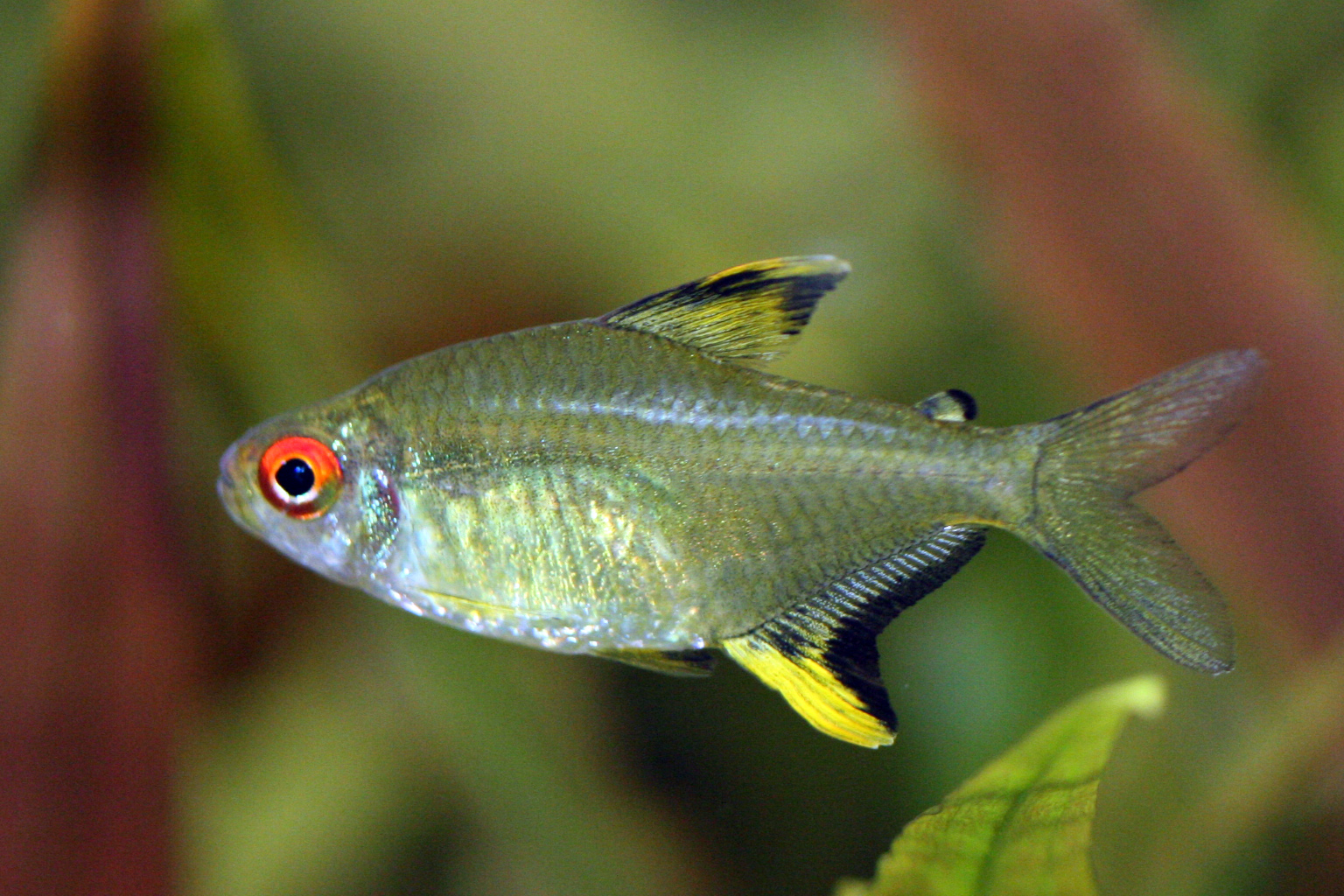

Conservation status
- Least Concern (IUCN 3.1)

Scientific classification
- Kingdom: Animalia
- Phylum: Chordata
- Class: Actinopterygii
- Order: Characiformes
- Family: Acestrorhamphidae
- Subfamily: Hyphessobryconinae
- Genus: Hyphessobrycon
- Species: H. pulchripinnis

Binomial name
- Hyphessobrycon pulchripinnis C. G. E. Ahl, 1937

= Lemon tetra =

Species of fish

The lemon tetra (Hyphessobrycon pulchripinnis) is a species of freshwater ray-finned fish belonging to the family Acestrorhamphidae, the American characins. This fish is from South America. It is a small tetra growing to 5 cm (2 in) in length. The species is a long established favourite aquarium fish, being introduced to the aquarium in 1932.

== Distribution ==
The lemon tetra is an Amazon River fish species, first collected from the basin of the Rio Tapajos, near Santarém, Brazil. The fish can be found in both the Rio Tapajos and stretches of the Amazon proper in this region (the Rio Tapajos joins the Amazon at Santarém).

== Description ==
The lemon tetra is one of the deeper-bodied tetras, contrasting with slender, torpedo-shaped relations such as the cardinal tetra and the rummy nosed tetra, whose approximate body shape when seen from the side is that of a lozenge (often referred to as a diamond, a form of rhombus).

The basic body color of an adult specimen is a translucent yellow, with a pearlescent lustre emanating from the scales in particularly fine specimens. The dorsal and anal fin of the fish are marked with black and yellow: specifically, the anal fin is hyaline (glass-like appearance), with a black outer margin, the anterior three or four rays being an intense, acrylic lemon-yellow in hue, while the dorsal fin is principally black with a yellow central patch. The tail fin is mostly hyaline but in fine specimens (particularly alpha males) acquires a gunmetal-blue lustre. The pectoral fins are hyaline whilst the pelvic fins are translucent yellow, becoming more solidly and opaquely yellow with black posterior edges in fine specimens (again, alpha males are particularly notable in this regard).

The eye is a notable feature of this fish, the upper half of the iris being an intense red, in some specimens almost gemstone-ruby in appearance. The colour of this part of the iris is an indicator of the health of the fish: if this red colouration fades, or worse still turns grey, then this is an indicator of serious disease in the fish.

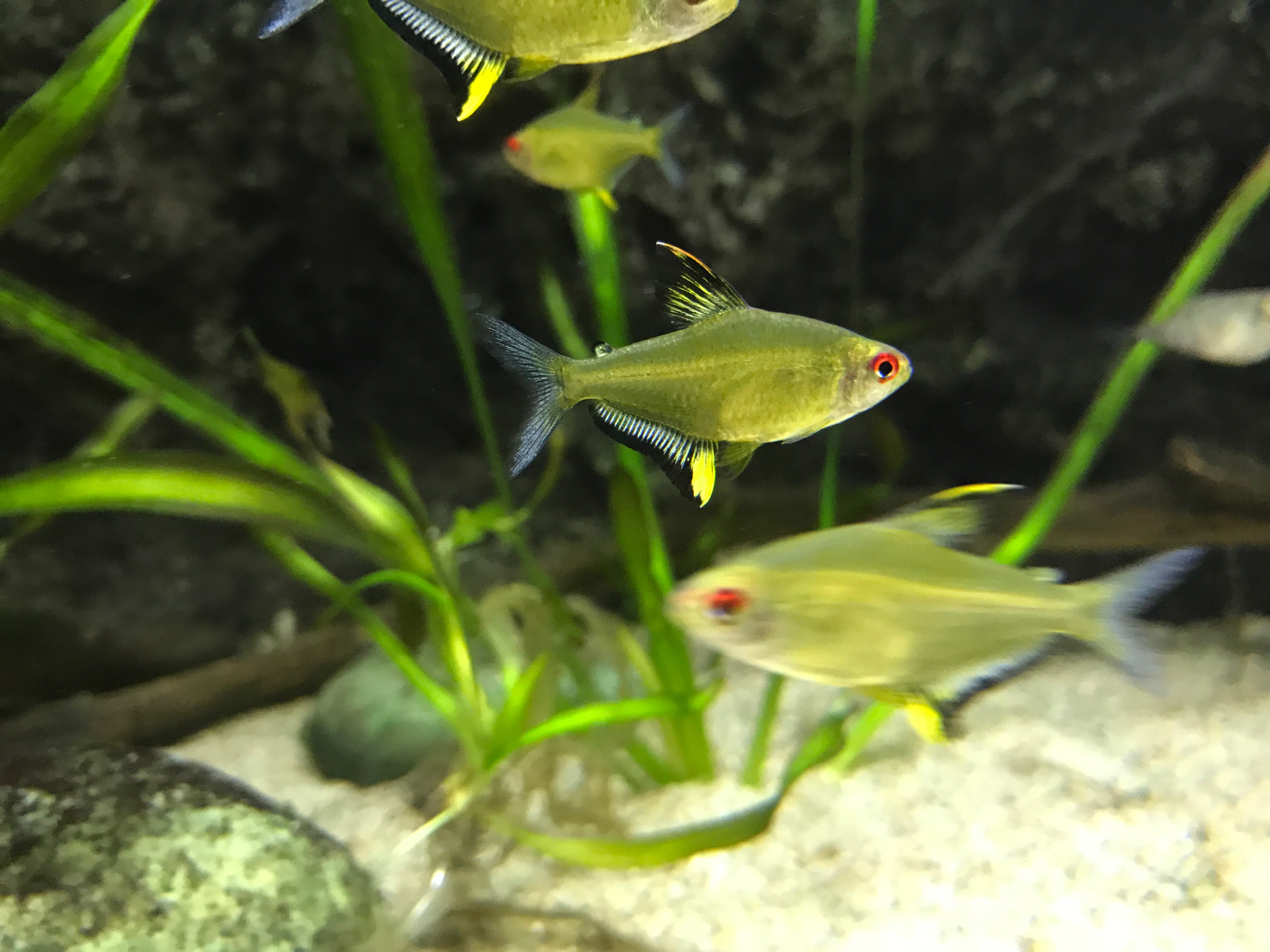
At the Vancouver Aquarium

In common with many characins, the lemon tetra possesses an adipose fin. This fin may acquire a black border, particularly in males, though this is not a reliable characteristic. Black areas of colouration on adult fishes frequently acquire a glossy sheen, enhancing the beauty of the fish.

Determining the gender of the fish is achieved in adult specimens by examining the black outer border of the anal fin. In female specimens, this consists of a fine black line, appearing almost as if drawn onto the fin with a fine pencil. In male specimens, particularly alpha males, the border is conspicuously wider, and in breeding alpha males, can cover up to a third of the total area of the anal fin. This is the only reliable means of differentiating gender in this species - while males frequently have taller and more pointed dorsal fins, some females also possess tall, pointed dorsal fins, and thus this characteristic is not reliable. Ripe females are fuller bodied, particularly when viewed from directly above, as the body cavity expands to accommodate the eggs forming within the female's reproductive tract.

Juvenile fishes are usually translucent with only a hint of the colour of the adult. The gender characteristics in juvenile fishes are not fully formed, so differentiating juveniles into male and female individuals is extremely difficult.

== Habitat ==
The lemon tetra inhabits clear waters with a modest to moderate current flow, remaining in shallower waters in close proximity to stands of aquatic plants. The water chemistry is slightly acidic, and the waters are relatively mineral-deficient. Lemon tetras congregate in their chosen waters in large shoals, numbering several thousand individuals, where the black and yellow colouration becomes disruptive from the standpoint of predatory fish species attempting to track an individual fish. The fishes are capable of moving at speed when required, and in a shoal the fishes will, when danger threatens, weave in and out of each other, adding to the visual confusion for a predator. The species preferentially occupies the middle and mid-lower water levels in the wild.

== Aquarium maintenance ==
Lemon tetras fare best in a planted aquarium, where they should be kept as schooling fishes, allowing them to replicate their wild behaviour as closely as possible. A minimum of six individuals should be kept in an aquarium, though if space allows, a larger number is preferable, as the species exhibits a marked preference for grouping together in large shoals of its own kind where possible. In a planted aquarium, the Lemon Tetra displays more vivid colouration - juvenile specimens in bare dealer aquaria usually appear 'washed out' in appearance and do not show the full splendour of which this species is capable. The aquarium for this species should be furnished with plant thickets interspersed with open swimming areas where the fishes can display to each other. Suitable companions in an aquarium include other tetra species, small barbs, small danios, small rasboras, Corydoras and Otocinclus catfishes, and in aquaria where space allows, certain species of dwarf cichlid such as the smaller Apistogramma species. Tankmates should be chosen to be peaceful, not too large, and a more natural display results if the companion fishes chosen are other South American species. An aquarium containing large shoals of lemon and cardinal tetras makes a particularly stunning display, the blue and red of the Cardinals contrasting with the brilliant yellow and black of the lemons.

While the preference of the lemon tetra with respect to water chemistry lies within the realm of soft (hardness less than 8° dH) and acidic (pH around 6.6) parameters, the species is notably hardy, and will accommodate itself to a wide range of conditions, the pH range for the fish being from 6.0 to 7.4. Temperature range for the species is 21 to 28 °C (70 to 82 °F), though the species is capable of withstanding water temperatures up to 32 °C (90 °F) for considerable periods of time if the water is well oxygenated. Aeration and good quality filtration should be provided for this fish (and indeed for all aquarium fishes) though the fish is sufficiently hardy to cope with aquarium equipment failures provided these are attended to upon discovery.

Extremes of high pH (8.0 or higher) and hardness should be avoided, as these will subject the Lemon Tetra to potentially life-threatening stress.

Feeding the lemon tetra poses few problems for the aquarist, as the fish readily and eagerly devours all fish foods offered to it. For prime conditioning (especially if captive reproduction is to be attempted) live foods such as Daphnia should be offered. The lemon tetra is particularly fond of live bloodworms (these are the aquatic larvae of Chironomus midges) and will attack this particular food item with a relish that has to be witnessed to be fully appreciated! Prepared foods such as flakes, freeze dried Tubifex worms and similar fare are also devoured avidly.

The lifespan of the lemon tetra in the aquarium can be as much as 8 years, though 6 years is a more typical figure.

== Reproduction ==
Lemon tetras exhibit an interesting behaviour pattern in the aquarium, replicated by several other characin species, in which males will adopt 'landmarks' within the aquarium and use these as places from which to display as maturity approaches. Displays are principally performed between rival males, which position themselves in a slightly head-up posture, unpaired fins held erect to appear as large and as imposing as possible, and swim forwards with 'flicking' movements of the body. If two rival males approach closely, they will then begin to make passes at each other, which to the causal observer look like attacks: this is an entirely ritualised behaviour, best referred to as 'jousting', where the males make darting movements toward each other but pull away at the last moment. No damage is incurred by either contestant in these events, and evenly matched males that are at a similar level in the social hierarchy will continue such behaviour for 30 minutes or more at a time. This behaviour serves not only to establish the social rankings of the males, but also serves as an indicator of reproductive fitness to the watching females.

In the wild, the lemon tetra is a communally spawning fish. Tens of thousands of pairs will spawn together, and choose thickets of fine-leaved aquatic plants as the repository for their fertilised eggs. This behaviour has several ramifications for captive reproduction, as will be duly noted.

When ripe females are receptive, males will court them, after a chase sequence through aquatic foliage in which several males may pursue an individual female, breaking off to pursue a different female as the opportunity arises, resulting in the aquarium in mad dashes hither and thither. Eventually, close observation will see a male court a female in some secluded area of aquatic foliage. The courting gesture of the male consists of a quivering motion, with a head-down posture, and the 'flicking' of the unpaired fins in such a manner as to generate flashes of yellow colouration in the visual field of the female. These flashes will be readily visible to the observing aquarist. If the female is ready to spawn, then the pair will migrate to fine-leaved aquatic plants such as Cabomba or Java moss, whereupon the pair will adopt a side-by-side position. The release of eggs and sperm is signalled by a quivering motion upon the part of both fishes, followed by an 'explosive' parting of the couple accompanied by the appearance of a cloud of eggs. The eggs are non-adhesive, and fall through the foliage, coming to rest either in thicker foliage at the base of the plants, or on the substrate.

One of the problems presented to the aquarist by this species is that of egg-eating. In the wild, as has already been noted, tens of thousands of pairs spawn simultaneously, and in order to reduce the competition for their own offspring, a pair will turn around and eat some of the eggs being produced by neighbouring spawning pairs. The same instinct, needless to say, manifests itself in the aquarium, but in an aquarium setting, the only eggs present are usually those of the single spawning pair. Consequently, some of the pair's own eggs will be devoured. Special measures to reduce losses through this behaviour are therefore required if the aquarist is interested in obtaining as large a yield of fry as possible. Special 'egg traps' have been devised for the purpose - these may consist of evenly spaced glass rods in a frame, a layer of glass marbles on the aquarium bottom, or some other such device. The purpose of all these designs is the same - to allow eggs to fall through small gaps into a space where they will be beyond the reach of the adults, who are unable to pass through the same gaps. However, the speed of movement of the adult fishes is such that even with an 'egg trap' in place, a small percentage of eggs will still be eaten.

A large adult female in prime condition may produce as many as 300 eggs.

A breeding aquarium for the lemon tetra thus requires good quality filtration and aeration, fine leaved plants, and an 'egg trap' present to prevent large-scale losses because of the aforementioned parental instincts. Temperature should be slowly raised over a period of a few days to 28 °C, the pair conditioned with copious quantities of live foods if possible, and the aquarium should be sited so as to receive illumination by morning sunshine, as this is a well-documented spawning stimulus for the lemon tetra. Parent fishes should be removed from the breeding aquarium and returned to the main aquarium once spawning is complete. Sometimes, best results are obtained by using two males with one female.

== Development ==
Fertile lemon tetra eggs take approximately 72 hours to hatch at 28 °C (82 °F). The fry spend a further 24 to 48 hours absorbing the yolk sac, whereupon they become free-swimming. At this stage, the fry should be fed with infusoria or a special egglayer fry food, and frequent partial water changes (around 10% of the aquarium volume every 24 to 48 hours) initiated. After 7 days, the fry should be ready to feed upon newly hatched brine shrimp. The fry appear to be almost transparent at first, with the exception of the eyes, and do not begin to develop the 'lozenge' shape of the adult body until the differentiation of the finfold into the unpaired fins is complete (around 4–6 weeks). Once this process is complete, the fishes are ready to take sifted Daphnia. Maintenance temperature for the fry should be carefully and slowly reduced to around 25 °C (77 °F) once the fishes are thus recognisably miniature versions of the adults. The first signs of black colouration on the unpaired fins may take a further two weeks of more to being manifesting themselves, and it will not be until the fishes are at least 12 weeks old that they will fully represent miniature versions of the parents. Even at this stage, the black colouration of the unpaired fins will be incompletely developed, and it will not be until sexual maturity is achieved (approximately 8 to 9 months after hatching) that the black border on the anal fin will become a reliable gender differentiation characteristic.

== Health and disease ==
Lemon tetra are relatively hardy but are not immune to common freshwater fish ailments. They are susceptible to diseases such as ichthyophthirius multifiliis (ich), which presents as white spots on the skin and fins, and various fungal infections that may manifest as cotton-like growths. Preventative measures include maintaining optimal water quality with regular water changes, ensuring a balanced diet, and avoiding overcrowded conditions that can stress fish and make them more prone to illness. It is also crucial to quarantine new fish before introducing them to an established tank to prevent the spread of disease. With proper care and attention to water quality and nutrition, lemon tetras can live a healthy life, contributing to the dynamic ecosystem of a home aquarium.

== See also ==
- List of freshwater aquarium fish species
