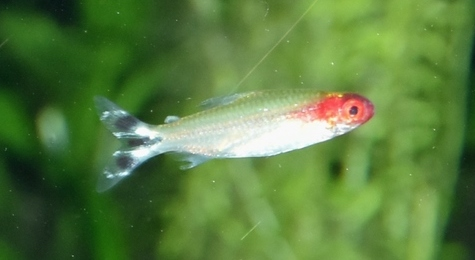

Conservation status
- Least Concern (IUCN 3.1)

Scientific classification
- Kingdom: Animalia
- Phylum: Chordata
- Class: Actinopterygii
- Order: Characiformes
- Family: Acestrorhamphidae
- Subfamily: Megalamphodinae
- Genus: Petitella
- Species: P. georgiae

Binomial name
- Petitella georgiae Géry & Boutière, 1964

= Petitella georgiae =

Species of fish

Petitella georgiae, the false rummy-nose tetra or false rednose tetra, is a species of freshwater ray-finned fish belonging to the family Acestrorhamphidae, the American characins. This fish is found in South America, where it is caught for the aquarium trade.

== Taxonomy ==
Petitella georgiae was first formally described in 1964 by the French ichthyologists Jacques Géry and Henri Boutière, with its type locality given as Lagunas village in the lower Río Huallago in Loreto District, Peru. When Géry and Boutière described this species they proposed the new genus Petitella, of which it was the only species and the designated type species. In 2020 two species, Hemigrammus bleheri and H. rhodostomus, were reclassified into Petitella, as a molecular phylogentic study found that they were sisters to P. georgiae. The genus Petitella belongs to the subfamily Megalamphodinae, the red tetras, within the American tetra family, Acestrorhamphidae. This family is classified within the suborder Characoidei of the order Characiformes.

== Etymology ==
Petitella georgiae is the type species of the genus Petitella. This name suffixes the Latin diminutive -ella onto the surname of the French zoologist and anatomist Georges Petit, who was director of the Laboratoire Arago in France. The specific name, georgiae, honours Géry’s wife, Georgie.

== Description ==
Petitella georgiae has a maximum standard length of 3.9 cm (1.5 in). This species can be distinguished from the other two Petitella species by the possession of a long, broad maxilla with a single row of teeth on the premaxilla, and between 9 and 11 teeth, with 5 cuspids on the dentary and the absence of a black spot on the lower part of the caudal peduncle.

== Distribution and habitat ==
Petitella georgiae is found in the western Amazon Basin in Brazil, Colombia, Ecuador and Peru. This species is found in lakes in the floodplains of clear water rivers.

== Utilisation ==
Petitella georgiae occurs in the aquarium trade, although it is less commonly traded than its congeners.
