= King betta =

The King betta is a popular aquarium fish of unknown provenance.

== Description ==
One of the beautiful, intelligent and smart fish,"The King betta" generally grows to about 5–6 cm (2–2 1/2 in). Its pigments are generally vibrant beige to a white. As with most bettas, King betta females are smaller (even the fins) and less colorful than the males. The king betta can be happy or even aggressive based on the environment and can be trained easily (rather than the wild bettas') and they remember their owners for longer time period. The life span of the King betta is short, generally 2–3 years, rarely reaching four. The King betta is (as are all other bettas) members of the gourami family (Osphronemidae) and prefers a temperature of 78–82 °F.

== History ==
Hardly anything is known about the King betta. Betta raja and Betta splendens cross bred in nature to create the King betta we know today. Others suppose that the King betta was bred from wild stock of B. raja.

== Diet ==
King bettas eat fish flakes, pellets, bloodworms and freeze-dried brine shrimp.

== Behavior ==
Male and female king bettas flare or puff out their gills in order to appear more impressive, either to intimidate rivals or attract mates, as well as when they are startled. Females often flare their gills at other females (rare in B. splendens.) All bettas require a place to hide occasionally, even in solitary tanks. They may set up a territory centered on a plant or rock, which they will guard aggressively. This breed is not appropriate for a typical community tank due to its aggressiveness, particularly towards species of fish with long, flowing fins.

== Maintenance ==
When maintaining the aquariums for this breed, instead of using substrate, breeders go for driftwood roots or branches, bark of Beech or oak and position them in a way that offers some kind of shades to the fish. To add to the natural environment, dry leaves are also used, which along with the Tannin from the wood, act as a supplement fish food when decomposed.

For king bettas, always dim lighting and aquatic vegetation like Microsorum pteropus and Taxiphyllum barbieri is advised. A sprinkling of floating aquatic plants also help to maintain the lighting in the tank. An air-powered sponge filter in place of other forms of filtration gadgets are preferred. As these species tend to make jumps, the tank should be covered, but care should be taken not to fill it to the brim as the fish seek the humid air that develops in the empty space.
