= Barcelos Municipality =

Barcelos Municipality may refer to:

- Barcelos, Amazonas, Brazil
- Barcelos Municipality, Portugal
