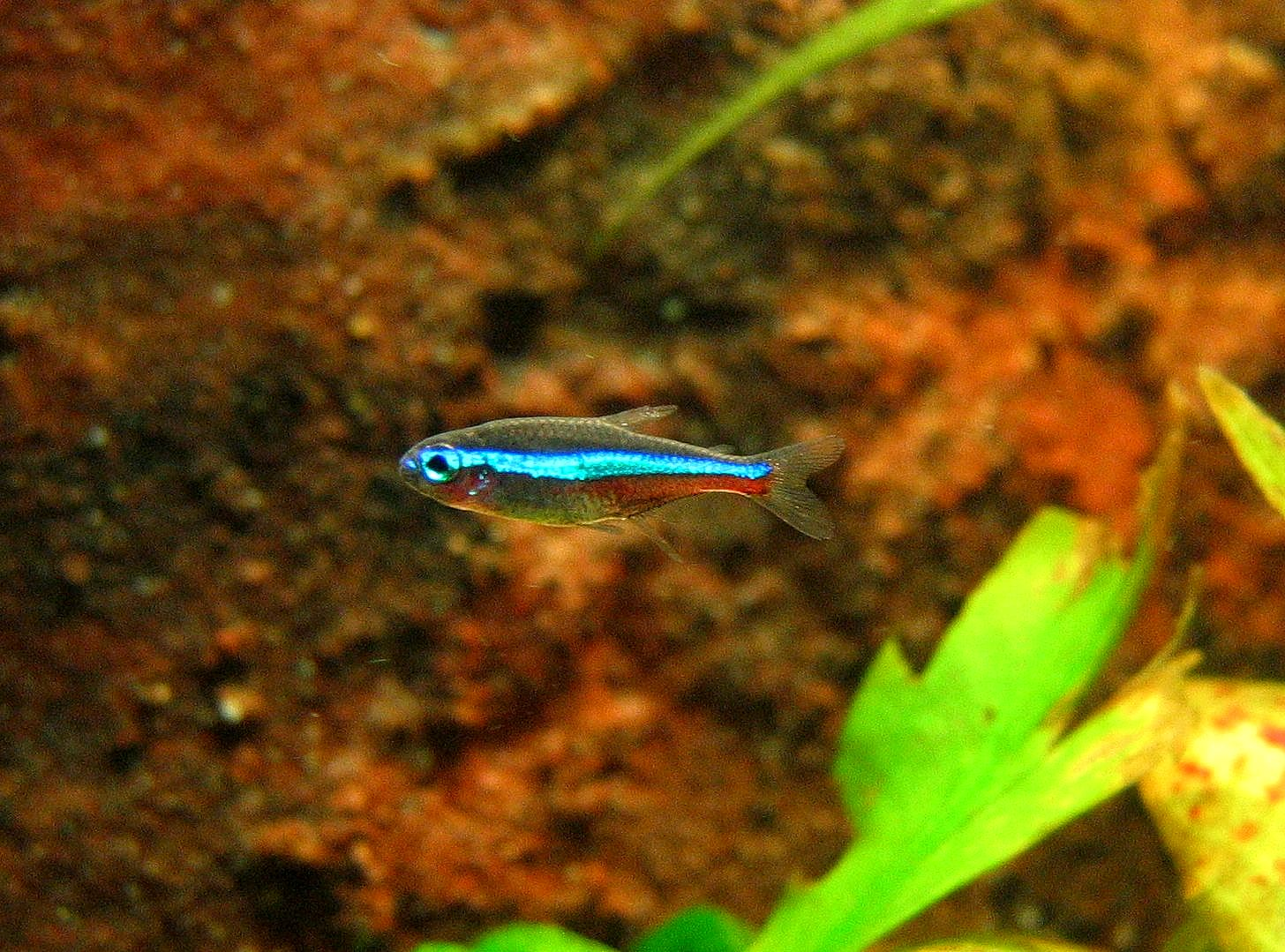

Conservation status
- Least Concern (IUCN 3.1)

Scientific classification
- Kingdom: Animalia
- Phylum: Chordata
- Class: Actinopterygii
- Order: Characiformes
- Family: Acestrorhamphidae
- Subfamily: Megalamphodinae
- Genus: Paracheirodon
- Species: P. simulans

Binomial name
- Paracheirodon simulans (Géry, 1963)

Synonyms
- Hyphessobrycon simulans Géry, 1963

= Green neon tetra =

Species of fish

The green neon tetra (Paracheirodon simulans) is a species of freshwater fish of the family Acestrorhamphidae, the American characins, of the order Characiformes. It is native to the upper Orinoco and Negro Rivers in South America.

== Taxonomy ==
The green neon tetra was originally described as Hyphessobrycon simulans in 1963. It was integrated into the genus Paracheirodon in 1983, along with the cardinal tetra on the basis of morphological similarities. This change is now supported by molecular studies.

== Description ==
The green neon tetra grows to a standard length (SL) between 10–20 mm (0.39–0.79 in). There is considerable overlap in both length and body depth between this species and others in the genus.

This fish may be distinguished from the two other Paracheirodon species by a few key characteristics. For example, unlike the neon tetra and cardinal tetra, the blue-green lateral stripe in this species extends all the way to the base of the tail. The red underside is less pronounced. Additionally, this is the only species in the genus to possess premaxillary teeth in 2 separate rows. P. simulans typically possesses 8 dorsal fin rays, 8 pectoral fin rays, and 6 pelvic fin rays, all of which are branched.

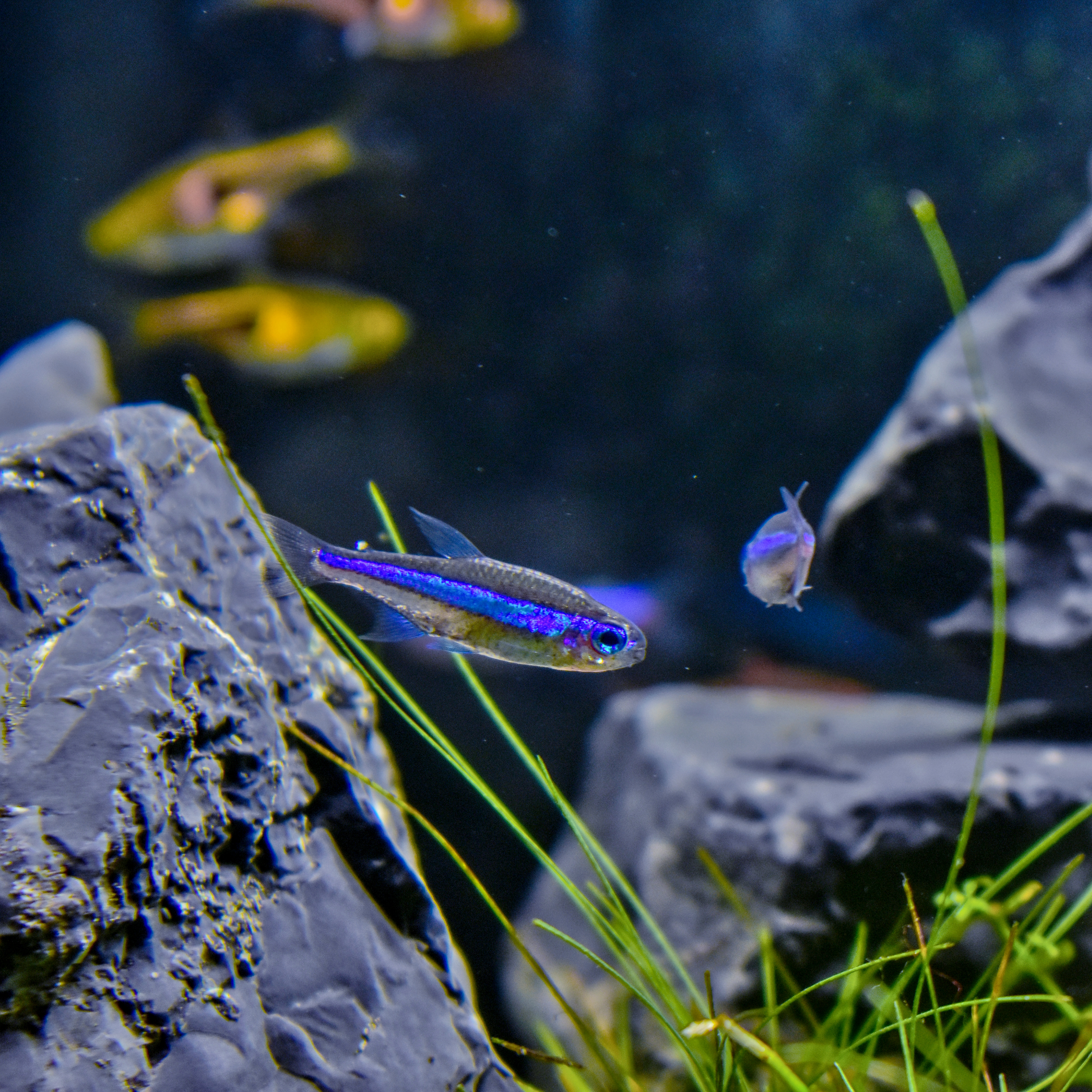
A green neon tetra with the lack of red stripe clearly visible

This fish loses its brilliant blue and red colours when lights are switched off, but regains them when lights are switched on again.

== Distribution and habitat ==
Though the green neon tetra is described as being from the Negro and Orinoco Rivers, it may be restricted to the uppermost portion of the tributaries of these rivers, as well as within the terra firma and heavily planted wetland areas between. Though there is some overlap with the range of P. axelrodi, the two species are thought to partition their habitat.

In wetland areas of their range, dissolved oxygen concentrations range from 0.7 to 4.4 mg/L and pH from 4.3 to 4.7, with averages of 2.1 mg/L and 5.0, respectively. Temperatures may range between 25–35 °C (77–95 °F), with no stress observed at the extremes.

== Breeding ==
For breeding, these tetras need water similar to the waters in which they live in the wild; extremely soft water with a pH of about 6 and a temperature of around 77 °F (25 °C). Ideally, the water should be highly stained by the tannins from peat, in subdued light, shaded by plants. It spawns in a school, although in the actual act of spawning, one female may be closely associated with one or more males.

About 130 eggs a batch can be laid by each female. The parents should be removed after spawning. The eggs should hatch in 24 hours. The eggs are light sensitive so avoid light. The babies are very small, so feeding infusoria (protozoa) is necessary early on. As they grow, this can increasingly be supplemented with fine commercial fry foods. Adults can breed again after a few weeks.

== Conservation ==
Like the other Paracheirodon species, the green neon tetra is kept as an aquarium fish, but it is less commonly exported, with about 17,000 individuals exported in 2002. Their capture for use in the aquarium trade is the only known threat to their populations, though it is not considered a significant one. The species remains quite abundant in its native habitat.

Additionally, the species' unique physiology allows them to be quite resistant to the effects of climate change. In an experiment, P. simulans showed 100% survival in even the most extreme conditions of lower dissolved oxygen and pH, as well as higher carbon dioxide and temperature.

== See also ==
- List of freshwater aquarium fish species
