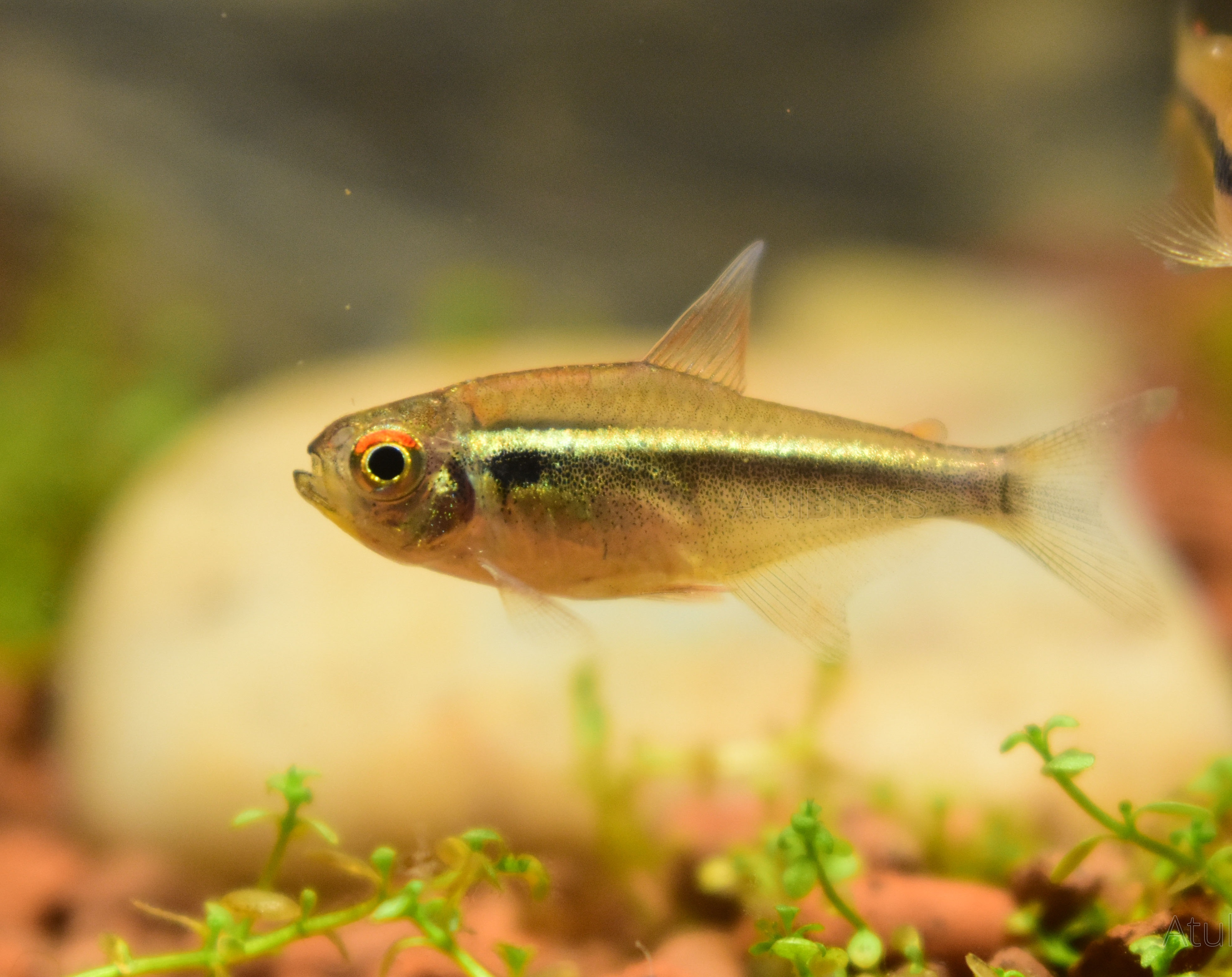

Conservation status
- Least Concern (IUCN 3.1)

Scientific classification
- Kingdom: Animalia
- Phylum: Chordata
- Class: Actinopterygii
- Order: Characiformes
- Family: Acestrorhamphidae
- Genus: Hyphessobrycon
- Species: H. herbertaxelrodi

Binomial name
- Hyphessobrycon herbertaxelrodi Géry, 1961

= Black neon tetra =

Species of fish

The black neon tetra (Hyphessobrycon herbertaxelrodi) is a freshwater fish of the characin family (Characidae) of the order Characiformes. It is native to the Paraguay basin of southern Brazil. They are often found in the aquarium trade, and a feral population has been established in the rio Paraíba do Sul basin due to the trade.

== Taxonomy ==
The species is named in honor of pet-book publisher Herbert R. Axelrod (1927–2017), whose Tropical Fish Hobbyist magazine published this description and several others by Géry.

== Description ==
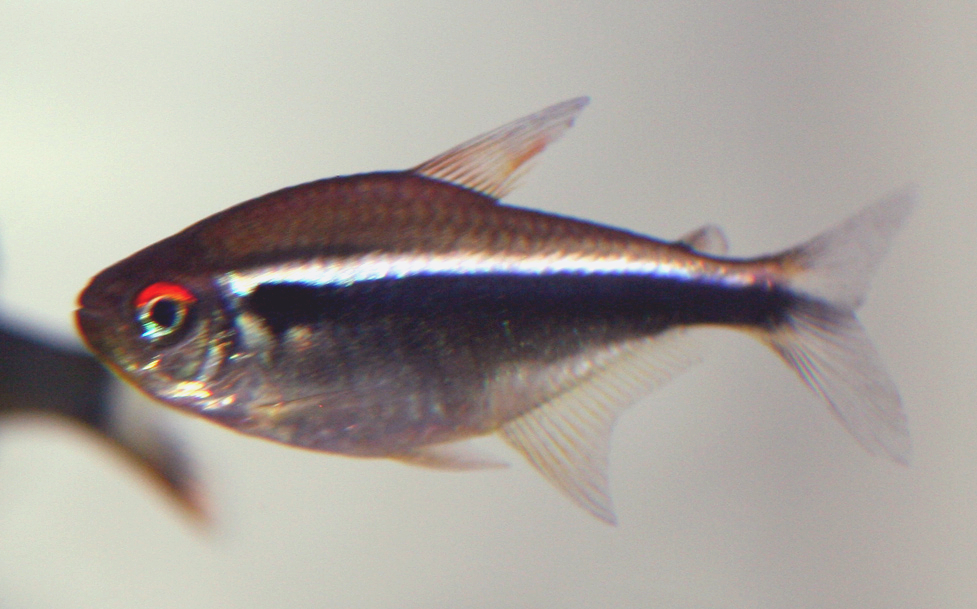
An adult black neon tetra

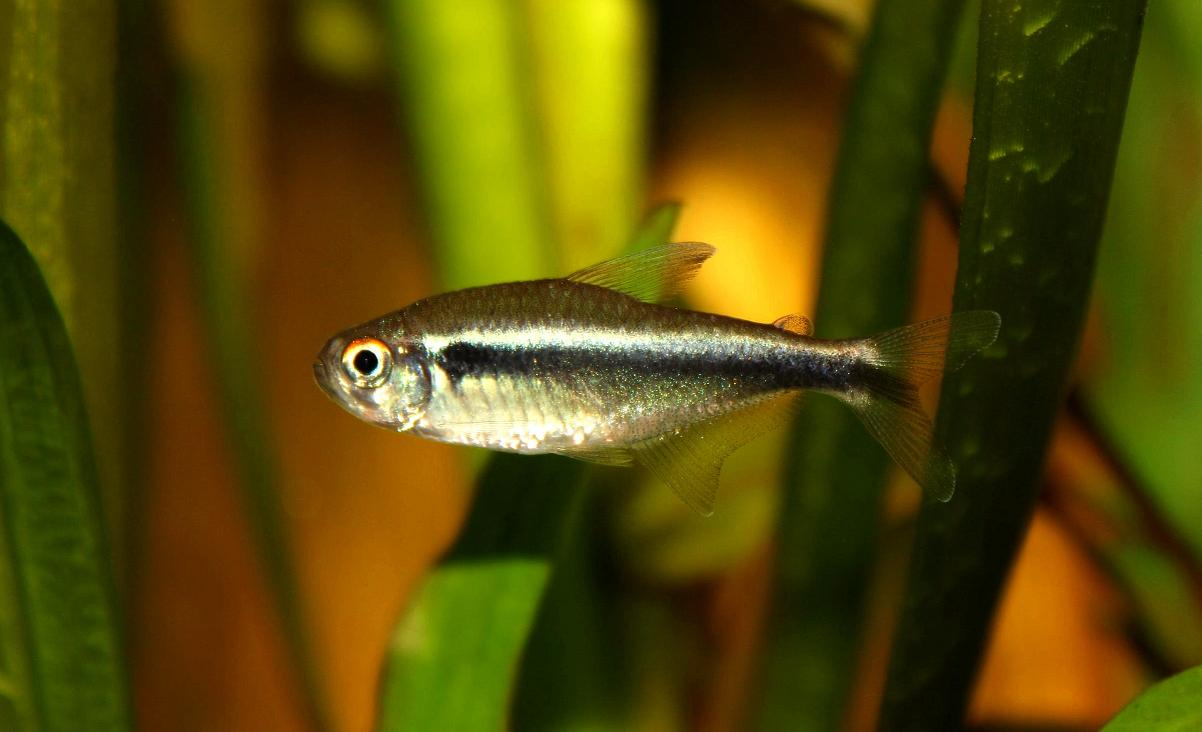
A juvenile black neon tetra

This species is of typical elongated tetra appearance; it is of plain basic coloration, but with two distinct, adjacent, longitudinal stripes, white above black. The eye has two thin but distinctive color bands across the top, red above yellow. It grows to a maximum overall length of approximately 4 cm (1.6 in). Befitting its common name, it slightly resembles the neon tetra, which belongs to a different genus (Paracheirodon). Females are often larger than males.

The variety named Diamond or Brilliant does not have a white stripe but instead displays more reflective scales around the head.

The fish's natural diet consists of small invertebrates and plants.

H. herbertaxelrodi is commonly kept as an aquarium fish by hobbyists.

The black neon tetra is sometimes called the black tetra, but that name more properly refers to a different species, Gymnocorymbus ternetzi.

== In the wild ==
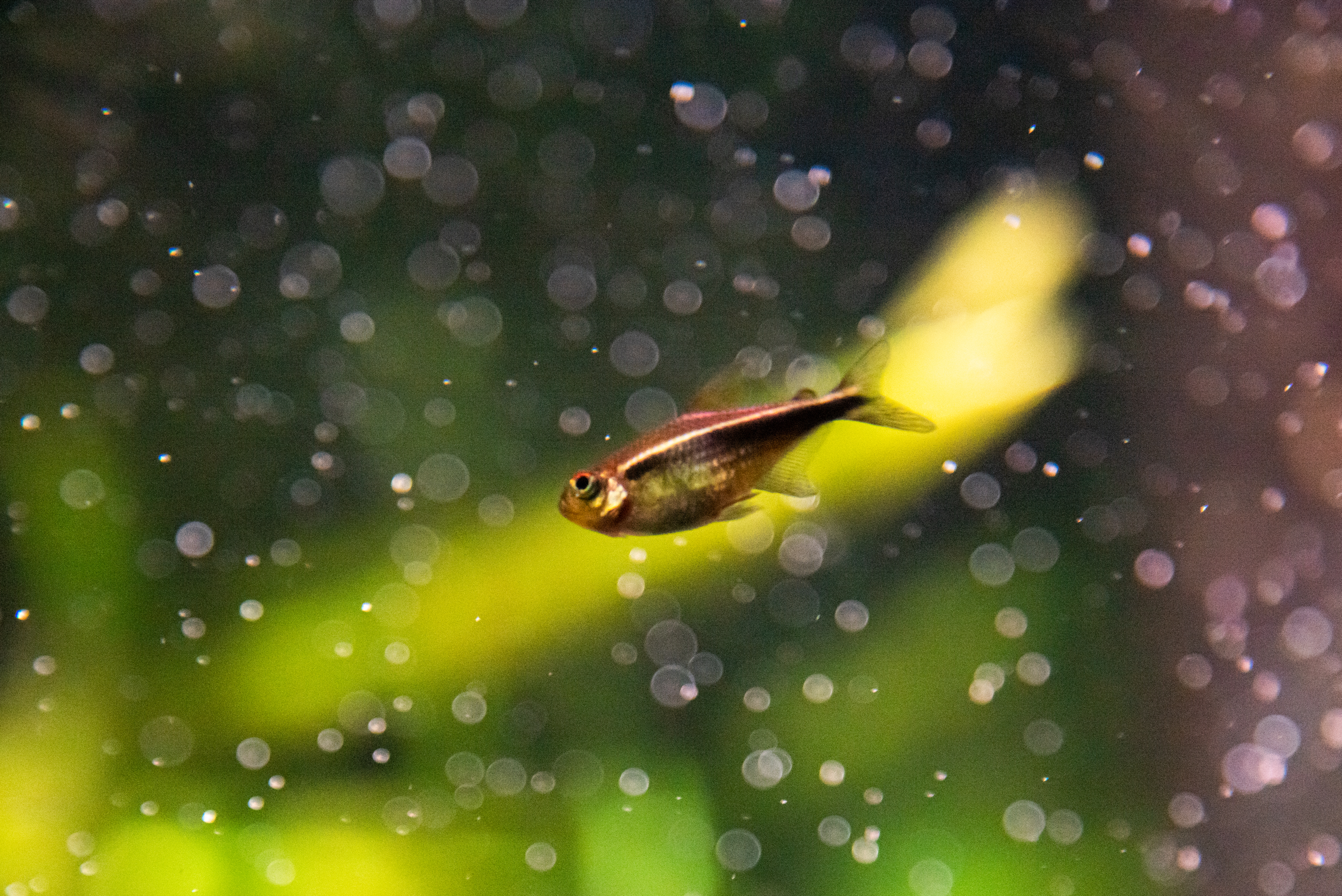
A gravid black neon tetra in the Leningrad Zoo

Black neon tetras are egg-scattering free spawners, and they show no parental care for fry. The black and white stripes on their sides are used to keep the shoal in contact with each other in turbid water.

As black neon tetras are so widely bred, they are no longer collected from the wild for trading.

Present in both forest streams and seasonal floodwaters, the black neon tetra is an adaptable species. It prefers acidic habitats with running water and waterlogged debris as well as aquatic plants.

== In the aquarium ==
Black neon tetras are kept in soft acidic water, although captive-bred they can often survive in mature tap water with a range of 5.5 - 7.5.

Black neon tetras are fed a variety of foods, including flake, frozen and freeze dried food, living healthiest on a balanced mix.

Contrary to other tetras, black neon tetras tend to shoal discreetly in aquaria.

=== Breeding ===
Black neon tetras can be spawned rather easily if the water quality is right. Before attempting to breed the black neon tetra, breeders condition the prospective parents with live food. Fish around one year old can be suitable for breeding. The sex of the fish is determined by its body shape, the female being much rounder and more plump than the males. Although the black neon tetra can be kept in water harder and more alkaline than its natural habitat, for breeding it is necessary to be closer to what it would feel like in the Amazon. Breeding the Black neon tetra requires acidic water with no more than four degrees of hardness.

The black neon tetra is an egg scatterer, laying adhesive (sticky) eggs over plants. One female can produce several hundred eggs. The parents eat their own eggs, so the parents are normally removed after spawning. As with many fish, the black neon tetra often spawns in the early morning. Raising the fry can be more difficult because of their small size. The first food will normally be protozoa (infusoria), then Daphnia.

=== Credit card fraud ===
"Fish eagerly read the terms and conditions. Many of us humans don't read the terms of service, but fish are smarter than we are"

— caption from Mutekimaru in a video about the incident

A black neon tetra inadvertently caused their owner's credit card to be charged during a 2023 livestream by "Mutekimaru Channel" on YouTube. The owner was using motion-tracking software to turn the fish's movements into Nintendo Switch inputs, letting them "play" video games. In 2020, the fish beat Pokemon Sapphire after 3,195 hours, a feat that takes about 30 hours for a typical human. On January 14, 2023, Pokémon Violet crashed at 1,144 hours, giving the fish free access to the main menu. They entered inputs that opened Nintendo eShop, added 500 yen ($3.85 USD) to their owner's account, and exposed his credit card details on the livestream. Mutekimaru later requested a refund of the 500 yen from Nintendo. Several media outlets facetiously described the fish as having committed "credit card fraud".

The fish also downloaded an N64 emulator, set up PayPal, used reward points to buy an avatar, and changed Mutekimaru's Nintendo account name to "ROWAWAWA¥". After about seven hours, their movements shut down the Switch.

== See also ==
- List of freshwater aquarium fish species
