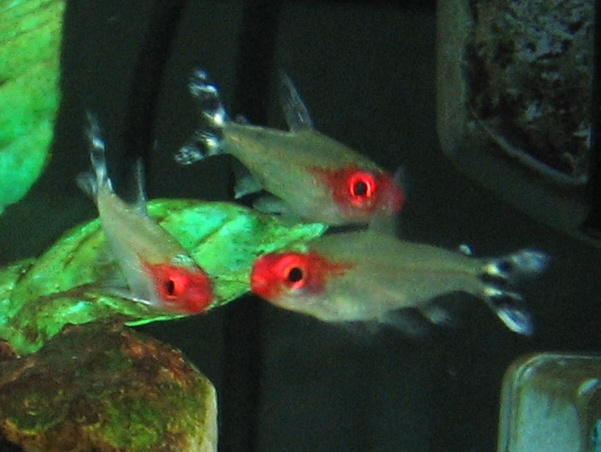
- Group of P. bleheri in an aquarium

Conservation status
- Least Concern (IUCN 3.1)

Scientific classification
- Kingdom: Animalia
- Phylum: Chordata
- Class: Actinopterygii
- Order: Characiformes
- Family: Acestrorhamphidae
- Subfamily: Megalamphodinae
- Genus: Petitella
- Species: P. bleheri

Binomial name
- Petitella bleheri (Géry & Mahnert, 1986)

Synonyms
- Hemmigrammus bleheri Géry & Mahnert, 1986

= Petitella bleheri =

Species of fish

Petitella bleheri, the firehead tetra, brilliant rummynose tetra or rednose tetra, is a species of freshwater ray-finned fish belonging to the family Acestrorhamphidae, the American characins. This fish is found in South America, where it is caught for the aquarium trade.

== Taxonomy and systematics ==
Petitella bleheri was first formally described in Tropical Fish Hobbyist magazine as Hemmigrammus bleheri in 1986 by the French ichthyologist Jacques Géry and the Austrian zoologist Volker Mahnert, with its type locality given as the middle basin of the Rio Negrom, probably near Rio Jufaris. In 2020, this species was reclassified in the formerly monospecific genus Petitella, as a molecular phylogentic study found that it was sister to the false rummy-nose tetra (P. georgiae). The genus Petitella belongs to the subfamily Megalamphodinae, the red tetras, within the American tetra family, Acestrorhamphidae. This family is classified within the suborder Characoidei of the order Characiformes.

The mitochondrial genome of Petitella bleheri was fully sequenced in 2015 using standard polymerase chain reaction (PCR) techniques, and was found to be 17,021 base pairs long.

== Etymology ==
Petitella bleheri is classified in the genus Petitella. This name suffixes the Latin diminutive -ella onto the surname of the French zoologist and anatomist Georges Petit, who was director of the Laboratoire Arago in France. The specific name, bleheri, honors the species' discoverer, the German explorer and fish trader Heiko Bleher.

== Description ==
Petitella bleheri has a laterally compressed body with a maximum standard length of 3.6 cm (1.4 in). It can be told apart from the other species in the genus Petitella by having a much more intense and widespread red color in the head, this reaching the humeral region; by having a longitudinal black bar at the end of the caudal peduncle which does not extend far forward; and by having a hyaline anal fin with no black bar.

== Distribution and habitat ==
Petitella bleheri is found in South America, where it occurs in the middle rio Negro, and from the upper and middle rio Orinoco basins in Brazil, Colombia and Venezuela. It is found in both clear and blackwater tributaries in flooded forests.

== Diet ==
Petitella bleheri feeds on algae and zooplankton, and specimens taken from the Rio Negro have had plant matter and detritus in their guts.

== In the aquarium ==
This species is common in the aquarium trade. Between 2006 and 2015, 7,178,906 specimens of Petitella bleheri were exported from the Amazonas state of Brazil, accounting for 5.04% of all fish exported from Amazonas for the ornamental fish trade during that time.
