= Pleistophora mulleri =

Scientific classification
- Kingdom: Fungi
- Phylum: Rozellomycota
- Class: Microsporidia
- Family: Pleistophoridae
- Genus: Pleistophora
- Species: P. mulleri

Binomial name
- Pleistophora mulleri (Pfeiffer) Georgev.

Pleistophora mulleri is a parasite of the amphipod Gammarus duebeni celticus (a subspecies of the boreal atlantic species of Gammarus, formerly Gammarus fabricius 1775, then later, Gammarus duebeni Lilljeborg 1852). The parasite targets the freshwater shrimp species and has shown higher rates of cannibalism, which in turn, affects biological communities and ecology.

== Development ==
The parasite begins development within the host's muscles as a merogonial plasmodia. The process of sporogony occurs when the amorous coat separates from the plasmalemma. A merontogenic sporophorous vesicle is then formed around the sporont The sporonts then proceed the developmental process by transforming into sporoblasts. The process transitioning from a sporont to sporoblast is known as morphogenesis. The final product of the life cycle yields a mature sporoblast complete with organelles.

== Transmission ==
It was discovered that P. mulleri was transmitted by cannibalism. The parasite is directly transmitted when an uninfected shrimp consumes infected tissue of the Pleistrophora parasite. Pleistrophora is host specific where P. mulleri has never been reported from G. duebeni duebeni or from non-Irish G. celticus populations, indicating a homoxenous life cycle.

== Host ==
The host, Gammarus duebeni celticus is a freshwater shrimp that inhabits Europe's "Celtic Fringe." Even though the host is largely distributed throughout Europe's Fringe, amphipod infection with P. mulleri is localized to certain areas such as Ireland due to P. mulleri's requirement for water with low salinity. Infected amphipods have an increased rate of cannibalism within their communities. When the parasite is present, cannibalism is favored in order to increase transmission rates. Consumption of infected tissue is 23% efficient for transmission.

== Cannibalism ==
Cannibalistic events differ when P. mulleri infects G. celticus. Once G. celticus ingests the microsporidian parasite, a "white tubular mass [forms] within the muscular tissue [of the host]". The mass inside the infected shrimp lowers activity levels, foraging abilities, and mate-guarding ability. Since the infected shrimp have lowered defenses, they are more likely to be eaten by adults of G. celticus, thus transmitting the parasite to other uninfected amphipods. When there is a choice between uninfected and infected shrimp, the adults will tend to cannibalize the healthier G. celticus regardless of age. It is able to distinguish which shrimp are healthier to consume regardless of the shrimp being a juvenile or adult. In contrast, infected G. celticus will not discriminate between uninfected or infected individuals. The parasite will benefit from either situation.

The rate of cannibalism is influenced by interactions between species. When competition arises from an invasion of another shrimp species, Gammarus celticus changes its lifestyle where competition between shrimp species over common prey is favored over cannibalism. For instance, when G. pulex and G. G. celticus are present in the same area, instead of going after their common prey, C. pseudogracilis, they engage in intraspecies predation. The two species interact with one another and shift focus from their prey. Thus the interaction between species can facilitate rates of cannibalism.

Since Pleistrophora affects the rates of cannibalism, this further influences the inter- and intraspecies interaction dynamics. The parasite makes G. celticus easier to invade, which in turn causes G. pulex to consume more shrimp upon arrival. This causes the survival rate of G. celticus to decrease while the relative fitness of G. pulex increases. Even though the invaders deplete the population of shrimp, the number of parasites does not decrease. This is due to the fact that "the mixed 'feeding frenzies' that form during cannibalism and intraguild predation (IGP) are likely to promote persistence of the parasite in G. duebeni celticus, even when G. G. pulex invades." Thus, the introduction of the pleipshora parasite mediates interspecies predation by decreasing the fitness of G. celticus.

== Influence on ecology ==
Pleistrophora mulleri affects ecology by influencing the density of shrimp within an area. Due to the fact that the parasite is located in the muscle cells, the host's movement is hindered. Because G. celticus is unable to travel far, the parasite forces them into certain patches which gives Gammarus pulex an opportunity to expand their territory. This in turn affects the population growth rate due to the fact that there are more shrimp with a higher distribution. Even though G. pulex and G. celticus have similar carrying capacities, reproductive output may be higher in G. pulex, potentially leading to a higher intrinsic population growth rate. Because G. pulex is able to reproduce and expand domination over G. celticus, the potential consequence is overpopulation. Over time, G. celticus can potentially cease to exist since there is a specific amount of organisms the environment can hold. Therefore, P. mulleri affects natural ecology by allowing other species to flourish and expand territories.
