= Betta raja =

Conservation status
- Least Concern (IUCN 3.1)

Scientific classification
- Kingdom: Animalia
- Phylum: Chordata
- Class: Actinopterygii
- Order: Anabantiformes
- Family: Osphronemidae
- Genus: Betta
- Species: B. raja

Binomial name
- Betta raja H. H. Tan & P. K. L. Ng, 2005

Species of fish

Betta raja is a species of betta endemic to the island of Sumatra in Indonesia. It is an inhabitant of swamps in lowland forests. This species grows to a length of 6.4 centimetres (2.5 in) SL. It is used as bait by local fishermen and has also been found in the aquarium trade. Despite its scientific epithet "raja" meaning "Prince" or "king", this species is not identical to the aquarium breed - the King betta. The derivation of the King betta is not fully known and may or may not involve crossbreeding with B. raja.
