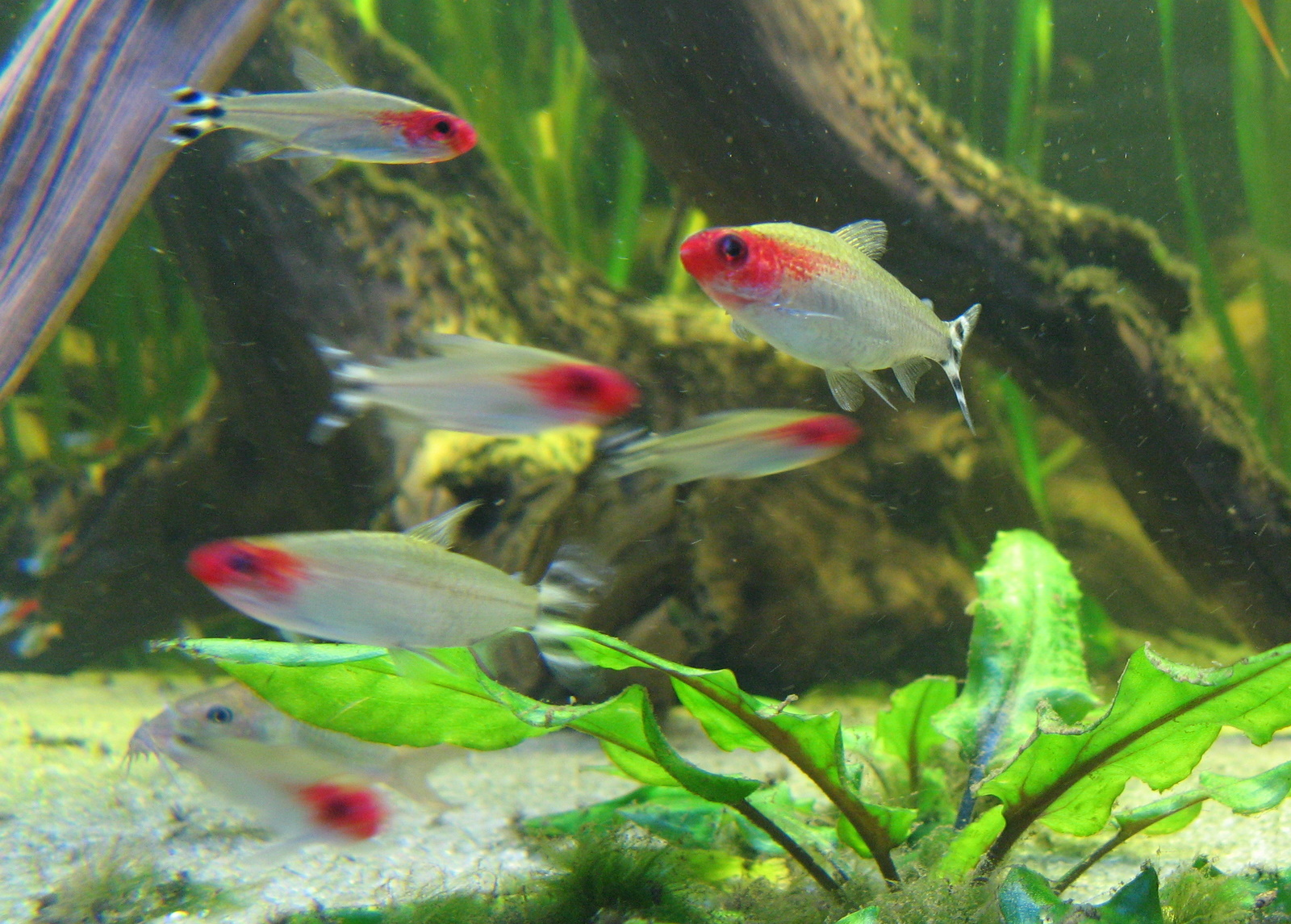
- Petitella bleheri

Scientific classification
- Kingdom: Animalia
- Phylum: Chordata
- Class: Actinopterygii
- Order: Characiformes
- Family: Acestrorhamphidae
- Subfamily: Megalamphodinae
- Genus: Petitella; Géry & Boutière, 1964

Type species
- Petitella georgiae Géry & Boutière, 1964

= Petitella =

Genus of fishes

Petitella is a genus of freshwater ray-finned fishes belonging to the family Acestrorhamphidae, the American characins, of the order Characiformes. The fishes in this genus are found in South America.

They are all popular tropical fish in the aquarium hobby. They are commonly known as rummy-nose tetras.

== Taxonomy and systematics ==
Petitella was first proposed as a monospecific genus in 1964 by the French ichthyologists Jacques Géry and Henri Boutière, with Petitella georgiae as its only species, which they also designated as the type species of the genus. This genus was formerly monotypic, featuring only P. georgiae. The other two species were allocated to Hemigrammus before the reallocation in 2020. This genus is classified within the subfamily Megalamphodinae, the red tetras, within the American Characin family Acestrorhamphidae. This family is classified within the suborder Characoidei of the order Characiformes.

== Species ==
Petitella contains the following valid species:

- Petitella bleheri (Géry & Mahnert, 1986) (Firehead tetra)
- Petitella georgiae Géry & Boutière, 1964 (False rummynose tetra)
- Petitella rhodostoma (Ahl, 1924) (Rummynose tetra)
