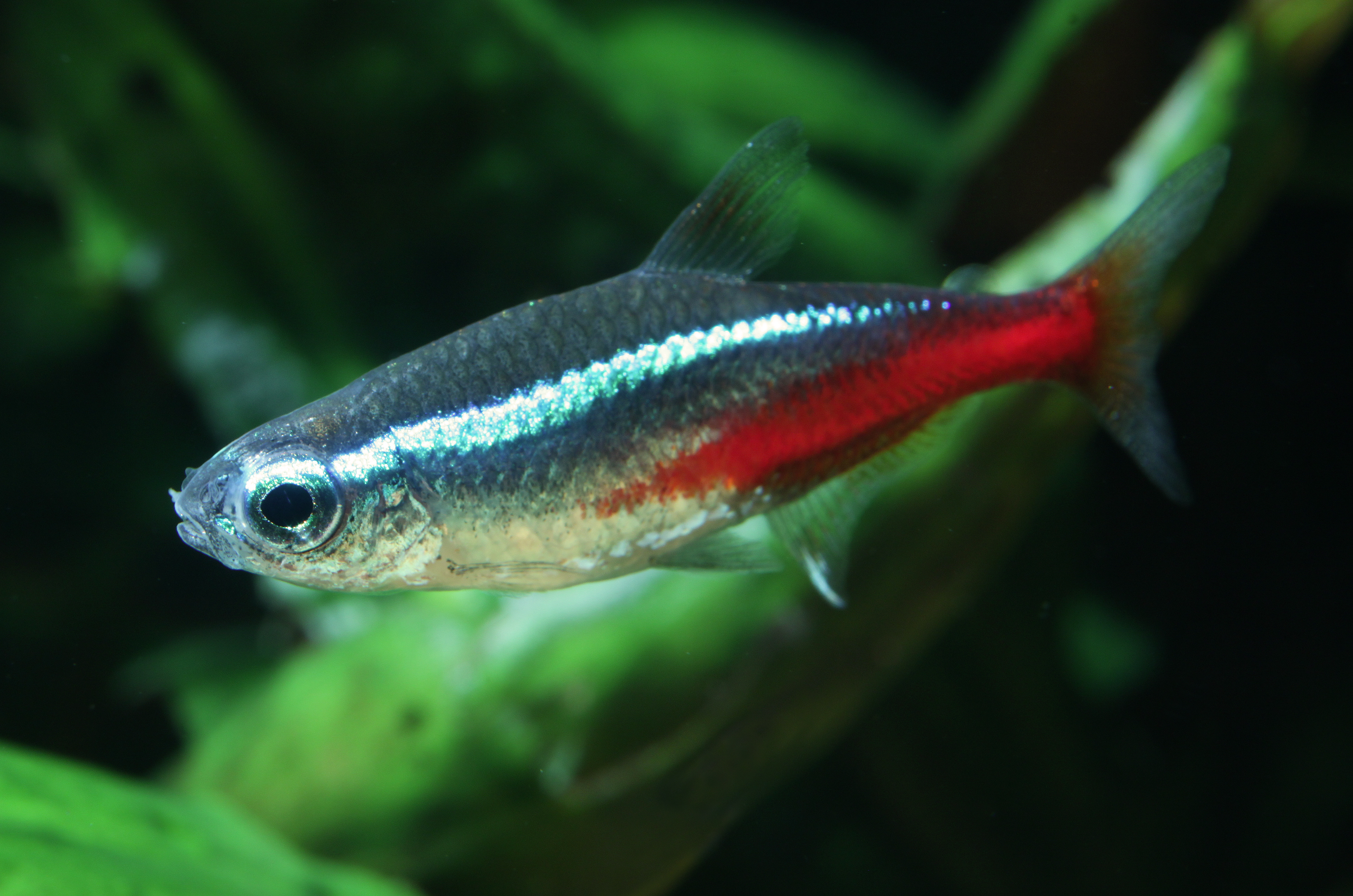

Conservation status
- Least Concern (IUCN 3.1)

Scientific classification
- Kingdom: Animalia
- Phylum: Chordata
- Class: Actinopterygii
- Order: Characiformes
- Family: Acestrorhamphidae
- Subfamily: Megalamphodinae
- Genus: Paracheirodon
- Species: P. innesi

Binomial name
- Paracheirodon innesi (G. S. Myers, 1936)

Synonyms
- Hyphessobrycon innesi Myers, 1936

= Neon tetra =

Species of fish

The neon tetra (Paracheirodon innesi) is a species of freshwater fish belonging to the family Acestrorhamphidae, the American characins, of the order Characiformes. The type species of its genus, it is native to blackwater and clearwater streams in the Amazon basin of South America. Its bright colouring makes the fish visible to conspecifics in the dark blackwater streams, and is also the main reason for its popularity among freshwater fish hobbyists, with neon tetras being one of the most widely kept tropical fish in the world.

== Range and habitat ==
The neon tetra is found in the western and northern Amazon basin in southeastern Colombia, eastern Peru, and western Brazil. It lives in waters with a temperature between 20 and 28 °C (68–82 °F) and pH 4–7.5. It has a preference for acidic blackwater streams, but also occurs in transparent clearwater streams. It is not found in the whitewater rivers. UN FAO considers P. innesi an introduced species in Singapore and the United States. FAO considers its introduction to Singapore to be ecologically and socioeconomically beneficial, but it is not established there.

== Description ==
The neon tetra has a light-blue back over a silver-white abdomen. The fish is characterized by a bright iridescent blue horizontal stripe along each side of the fish from its nose to the base of the adipose fin, and an iridescent red stripe that begins at the middle of the body and extends posteriorly to the base of the caudal fin. The fish is partially transparent (including fins) except for these markings. Sexual dimorphism is slight, with the female having a slightly larger belly, and a bent iridescent stripe rather than the male's straight stripe. During the night, the blue and red become gray or black as the fish rests. It reactivates once it becomes active in the morning. This peculiar change is due to the neon tetras capacity to change the color of its iridescent stripe in response to lighting conditions. In a light-adapted state it is blue-green, likewise in a dark-adapted state its color changes to indigo. This change is produced by guanine crystals in their cells that reflect light. The neon tetra grows to approximately 4 cm (1.6 in) in overall length.

== Economics ==
The neon tetra was first imported from South America and was described by renowned ichthyologist George S. Myers in 1936, and named after William T. Innes.

P. innesi is one of the most popular aquarium fish, with about 2 million sold in the US each month. Most neon tetras available in the United States are imported from Southeast Asia, where they are farm-raised, or to a lesser extent from Colombia, Peru, and Brazil, where they are collected from the wild. With the exception of home aquarists and a few commercial farms that breed neon tetras experimentally, captive breeding on a commercial scale is nonexistent in the USA.

== In the aquarium ==
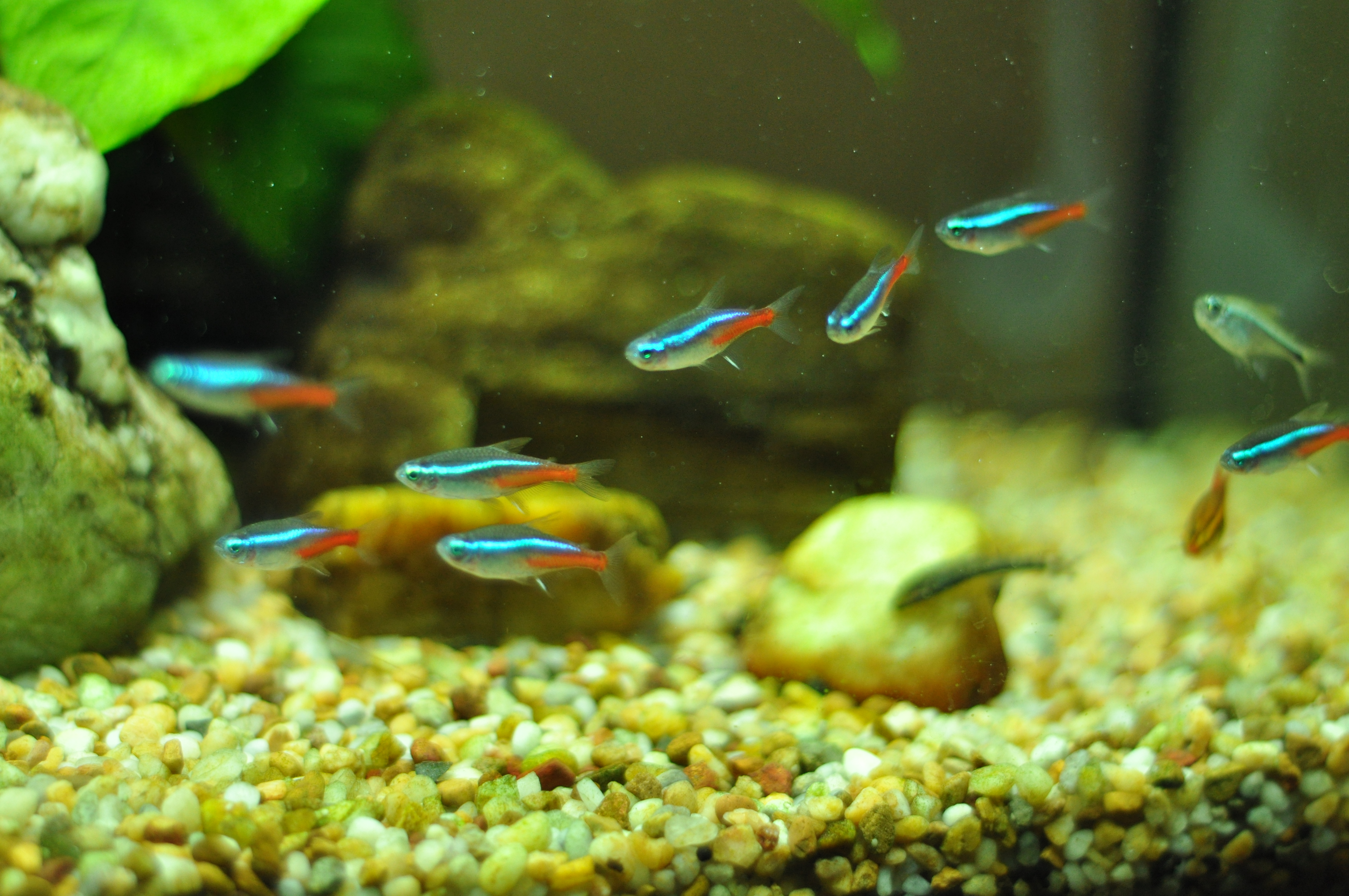
A shoal of neon tetras in a home aquarium

In the wild they inhabit very soft, acidic waters (pH 4.0 to 4.8) Ideal pH for aquarium is 7.0, but a range of 6.0 to 8.0 is tolerable. They can have a lifespan of as long as ten years, but normally just two to three years in an aquarium.

Neon tetras are considered easy to keep in an aquarium of at least 10 US gallons (38 L; 8.3 imp gal) with a temperature range of between 72–76 °F (22–24 °C), a water pH of between 6.0 and 7.0, GH of below 10 dGH and KH of 1–2 dKH, and under 20 ppm of nitrate.

They are shoaling fish and must be kept in groups of at least six, but will be more active in groups of eight to 12 or more. Neon tetras are best kept in a densely planted tank to resemble their native Amazon environments.

=== Nutrition ===
Neon tetras are omnivores and will accept most flake foods, if sufficiently small, but should also have some small foods such as brine shrimp, daphnia, freeze-dried bloodworms, tubifex, which can be stuck to the side of the aquarium, and micropellet food to supplement their diets. A tropical sinking pellet is ideal, as most brands of these include natural color enhancers that bring out the color in neon tetras. Some frozen foods, including frozen blood worms, add variety to their diets.

=== Breeding ===
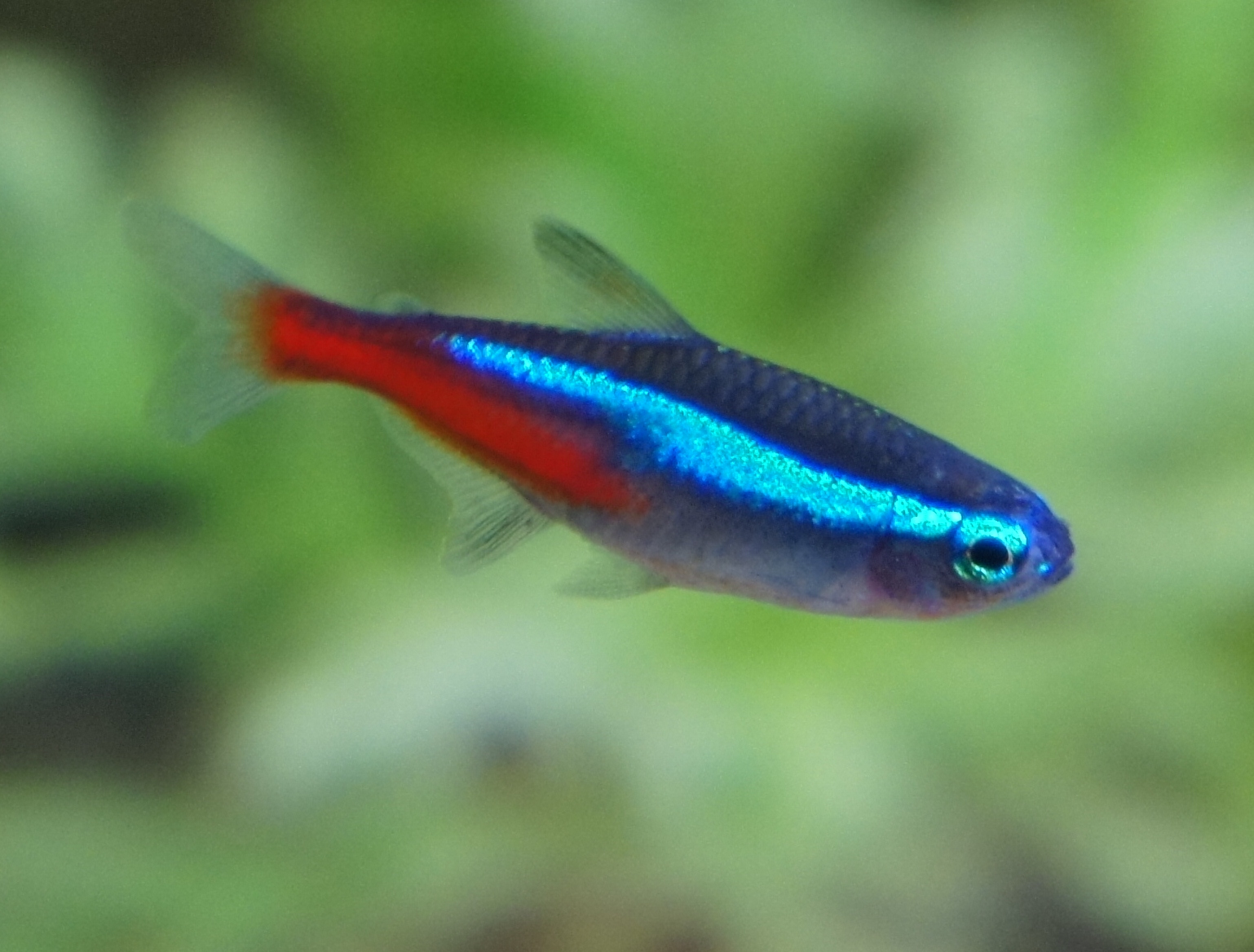
Neon tetra

The male is slender, and the blue line is straighter. The female is rounder, producing a bent blue line. Some aquarists say the females look plumper when viewed from above. However, the straightness of the line and the plumpness of the female might occasionally be due to the eggs she is carrying. A neon tetra can appear slightly plump in the belly due to having overeaten.

Neon tetras need dim lighting, a DH less than one, about 5.5 pH, and a temperature of 75 °F (24 °C) to breed. There also needs to be a lot of tannins in the water. Neon tetras are old enough to breed at 12 weeks.

Breeding neon tetras is considered to be difficult in home aquariums. However, it is becoming more common, with less than 5% of specimens currently sold in America caught in the wild, and more than 1.5 million specimens imported to America each month from fish farms.

=== Disease ===
Neon tetras are occasionally afflicted by the so-called "neon tetra disease" (NTD) or pleistophora disease, a sporozoan disease caused by Pleistophora hyphessobryconis. Despite being a well-known condition, it is generally incurable and often fatal to the fish. However this disease is also generally preventable. The disease cycle begins when microsporidian parasite spores enter the fish after it consumes infected material, such as the bodies of a dead fish, or live food such as tubifex, which may serve as intermediate hosts. The disease is most likely passed by newly acquired fish that have not been quarantined.

Symptoms include restlessness, loss of coloration, lumps on the body as cysts develop, difficulty swimming, curved spines as the disease progresses, and secondary infections, such as fin rot and bloating.

A so-called "false neon disease", which is bacterial, shows very similar symptoms. It is impossible for the home aquarist to determine for certain the difference between NTD and false NTD on the basis of visible symptoms alone, without laboratory backup. This disease has also been confused with columnaris (mouth rot, mouth fungus, 'flex').

Generally the best 'treatment' is the immediate removal of diseased fish to preserve the remaining fish, although some occasional successful treatments have been performed that include fish baths and a "medication cocktail". The use of a diatom filter, which can reduce the number of free parasites in the water, may help. As with Pleistophora neon tetra disease, prevention is most important and this disease is rare when good preventive measures are performed.

== Related species ==
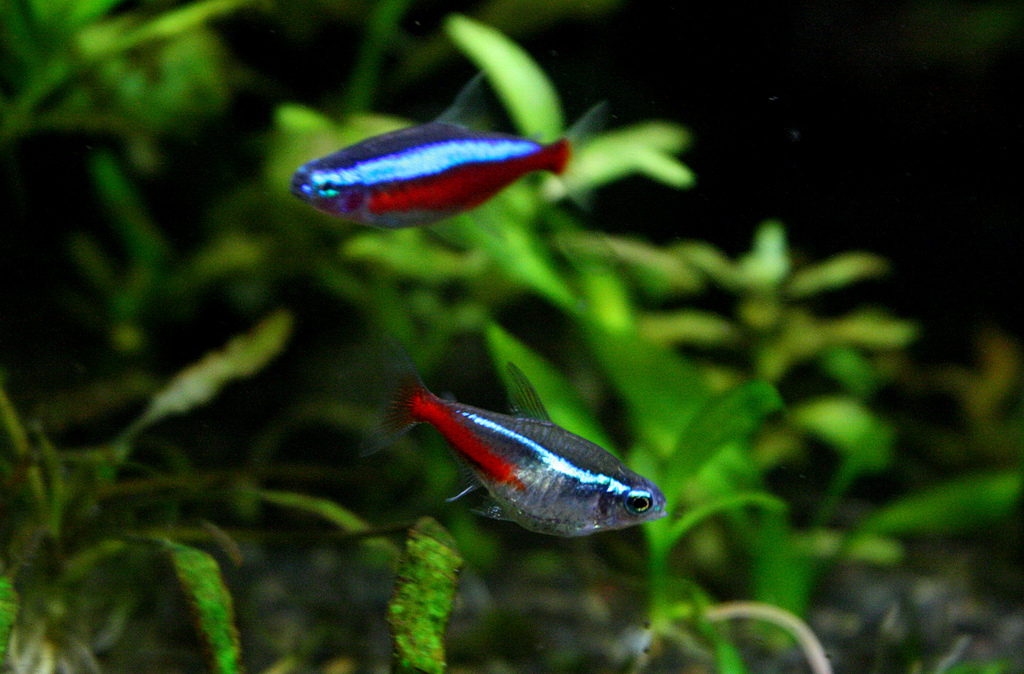
The cardinal tetra (above) has more red on the underside than the neon tetra (below).

The green neon tetra (P. simulans) and black neon tetra (Hyphessobrycon herbertaxelrodi) are distinct species—the latter belongs to a different genus—and not color varieties. The cardinal tetra (P. axelrodi) is also a similar species, but its greater extent of red coloring distinguishes it from the neon tetra. The name Hyphessobrycon innesi is an obsolete synonym for P. innesi.

== See also ==
- List of freshwater aquarium fish species
- Project Piaba
