= Pleistophora =

Scientific classification
- Kingdom: Fungi
- Division: Rozellomycota
- Class: Microsporidia
- Family: Pleistophoridae
- Genus: Pleistophora; Gurley 1893

Genus of microsporidia

Pleistophora is a genus of microsporidian parasites. Pleistophora are fish parasites, known to affect Neon Tetra.

== Species ==
- Pleistophora hyphessobryconis
- Pleistophora mulleri
