= Pleistophora hyphessobryconis =

Scientific classification
- Kingdom: Fungi
- Division: Rozellomycota
- Class: Microsporidia
- Family: Pleistophoridae
- Genus: Pleistophora
- Species: P. hyphessobryconis

Binomial name
- Pleistophora hyphessobryconis Schäperclaus. 1941

Species of microsporidian

Pleistophora hyphessobryconis is a unicellular, spore-forming parasite belonging to the class Microsporidia. This species is the causative agent an infectious disease in fish known as "neon tetra disease." P. hyphessobryconis is also a known pathogen of the zebra danio, a model organism used in many research laboratories.

== Disease ==
The primary host of Pleistophora hyphessobryconis is the neon tetra; however, this parasite demonstrates a broad range of host specificity and has been isolated from numerous species of aquarium fish. P. hyphessobryconis primarily infects the skeletal muscle with no involvement of smooth or cardiac muscle. There is minimal inflammation until the spores are released from their intracellular environment. Spores have been observed to spread to other organs within macrophages of infected fish. Infections are characterized with a high parasitic load with over half of the myofibers containing the parasite in some fish.

== Treatment ==
Diagnosis of Pleistophora hyphessobryconis infection is made through visual microscopy of damaged tissue. The Lilly-Twort and Accustain Gram stain procedures are effective at visualizing spores within infected tissue. Some veterinary diagnostic laboratories offer PCR testing for this parasite.

There are no treatment options available. Fish infected with P. hyphessobryconis should be removed from the enclosure to prevent the spread of the disease.
