= Project Piaba =

Fishery initiative

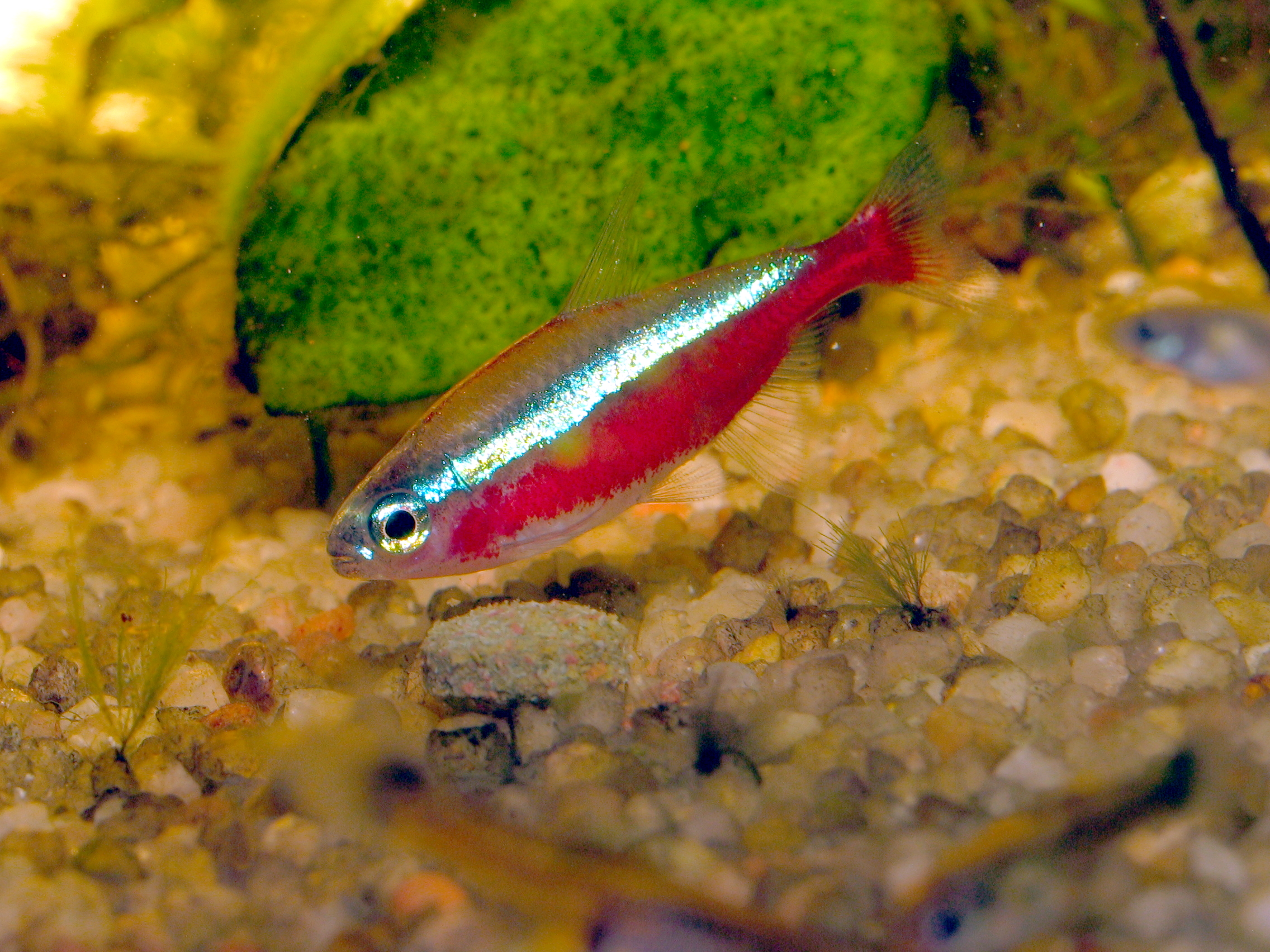
- A cardinal tetra, or piaba
- Established: 1991; 35 years ago
- Founders: Ning Labbish Chao, Gregory Prang
- Type: Non-governmental organization
- Legal status: Charity
- Purpose: Conservation of the Amazon River basin
- Headquarters: New England Aquarium
- Director: Scott Dowd
- Website: http://projectpiaba.org/

Project Piaba (/piːˈɑːbə/, pee-AH-bə) is a fishery initiative located on the Rio Negro tributary of the Amazon River. The program both promotes and researches sustainable aquarium pet fish collection and its impact on the environment. The name of the project comes from the Brazilian Portuguese word, piaba ([ˈpjabɐ]), which means "little fish", referring specifically to the cardinal tetra (Paracheirodon axelrodi). Project Piaba is an ongoing project with annual research expeditions to the Rio Negro region. Because of the sustainable nature of the project, its slogan is "Buy a Fish, Save a Tree!"

== Background ==
Many ornamental freshwater aquarium fish, including the cardinal tetra and the discus (Symphysodon ssp.), are sourced from the Amazon River Basin area. The Rio Negro region is the home of more than 100 different species of fish that are important to the pet fish trade. In fact, several species, including cardinal tetras, show the adaptive trait of iridescence which may provide lower visibility in a blackwater environment.

Project Piaba started with an ecological baseline study of the region which was conducted in 1989 by a group of researchers and students from the Universidade do Amazonas (UA) and the National Institute of Amazon Research (INPA). This initial survey discovered and documented the importance of the fish trade to the local economy, and it led the researchers to wonder about the impact the fishing had on the environment.

The ornamental fish trade in the Rio Negro region is considered "substantial by local standards, representing approximately US$ 3 million per year with over 30 million live fish exported annually." About 40,000 people in the region, many of them caboclos (river-dwelling families) are dependent on the income from their fisheries.

== Development ==
In the 1950s, Herbert R. Axelrod and Willi Schwarz had begun shipping aquarium fish out of Barcelos in Brazil. In 1991, Ning Labbish Chao and Gregory Prang founded Project Piaba in order to support the local fisheries and in concert with them, help protect the habitat of collected fishes. Because of the "gentle" way the fish are caught and most of the fish caught for the aquarium trade are short-lived and would naturally die out during the dry season, the ecological impact of catching the fish is considered minimal. The fish are also not caught by fish farmers during their breeding season. The cardinal tetra, especially, is considered a renewable resource. Project Piaba assesses the sustainability of the species farmed in the Rio Negro area by using the "F value" which estimates the portion of the catch from the total biomass.

The center of the Rio Negro aquarium trade, Barcelos, now celebrates ornamental fish in a festival held every January in conjunction with the annual research expedition of Project Piaba. A stadium, known as Piabodrome, was even built for the festival. The first festival took place in 1994, and a permanent exhibit highlighting the fish was installed in Barcelos by Project Piaba that same year. Money donated by ichthyologist Herbert Axelrod helped support a lab and then later, the Centre for Aquatic Conservation, which has helped educate, support research and awareness of the project. The Centre was first opened in 1997. Other funds have come from the Association of Ornamental Fish Breeders and Exporters of Amazonas (ACEPOAM) for research on both the fish and the welfare of the fish farmers.

== Structure ==
Scott Dowd is, as of 2015, the director of Project Piaba. He leads the yearly expeditions with experts from around the world, volunteers, and even family visiting the Amazon region.

The project has acted as a case study for other, similar projects. Areas such as the Western Ghats in India and areas of Bali are beginning to use similar practices to make money from the fish trade and sustain the environment of the fish. Project Piaba is often used to show how groups can support the environment while providing economic stimulus to a poor region of the world. In addition, the sustainable sourcing of fish is also a stimulus to the idea of "beneficial home fishkeeping", which emphasizes proper fish care, which, in turn, supports those who catch the fish in the wild. When no incentive exists to fish, individuals in the Rio Negro area turn to less environmentally friendly means of support, such as logging or cattle ranching. In fact, Project Piaba aims to actively discourage domestic farming of fish that are also sustainable resources, like the cardinal tetra, because it takes the financial incentive away from protecting the rain forest of the Rio Negro area.

== Legacy ==
The project has the support of aquaria and zoos around the world and also from the International Union for Conservation of Nature.
