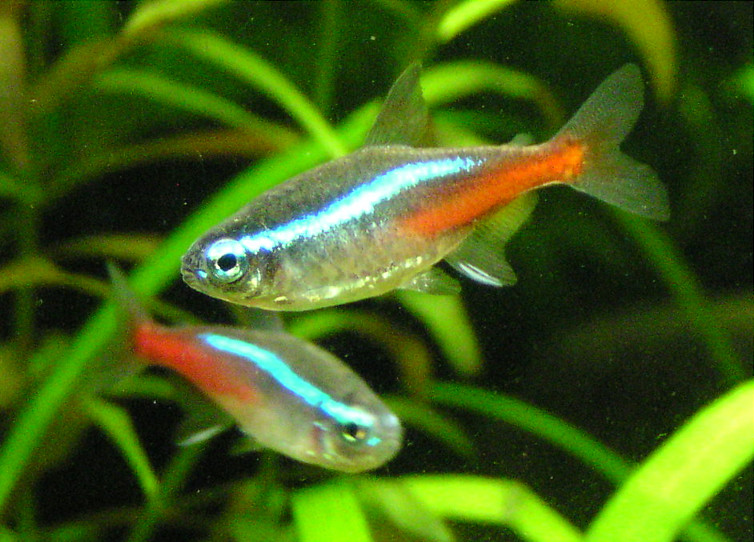
- Neon tetra (P. innesi)

Scientific classification
- Kingdom: Animalia
- Phylum: Chordata
- Class: Actinopterygii
- Order: Characiformes
- Family: Acestrorhamphidae
- Subfamily: Megalamphodinae
- Genus: Paracheirodon; Géry, 1960

Type species
- Hyphessobrycon innesi Myers, 1936

Synonyms
- Lamprocheirodon Géry, 1960

= Paracheirodon =

Genus of fishes

Paracheirodon is a genus of freshwater ray-finned fishes belonging to the family Acestrorhamphidae, the American characins, of the order Characiformes. The type species is P. innesi, the well-known neon tetra, and the Paracheirodon species are among the fishes known as tetras. All species of this genus are native to the Neotropical realm, occurring in the Orinoco and Amazon Basins in northern South America.

Paracheirodon tetras reach maximum overall lengths of 2.5 to 5 cm (0.98 to 1.97 in) depending on the species, and are of elongated, tetra shapes. All share a distinctive iridescent blue lateral line, but differ slightly in their other colorations.

Preferring soft, acidic waters, these midwater shoaling fishes feed predominantly on small crustaceans, insects, worms, and zooplankton. When spawning, they scatter their eggs and guard neither eggs nor young.

The generic name Paracheirodon derives from the Ancient Greek χείρ (hand), and οδών (teeth), prefixed with παρά (beside) to distinguish it from the similar characin genus Cheirodon.

== Species ==
The currently recognized species in this genus are:

Image	Species	Common name	Range
	Paracheirodon axelrodi (L. P. Schultz, 1956)	Cardinal tetra	Upper Orinoco and Negro River basins.
	Paracheirodon innesi (G. S. Myers, 1936)	Neon tetra	Blackwater and clearwater stream tributaries of the Solimões River.
	Paracheirodon simulans (Géry, 1963)	Green neon tetra	Upper Orinoco and Negro River basins.
