= Barcelos, Amazonas =

Municipality of Amazonas, Brazil

Barcelos
- Municipality
- Municipality of Barcelos
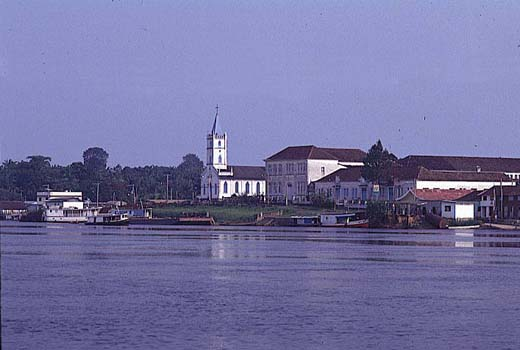
- A view of the city

- Flag
- Nickname: "Capital do peixe ornamental" ("Capital of the ornamental fish") Cidade menina ("Girl City")
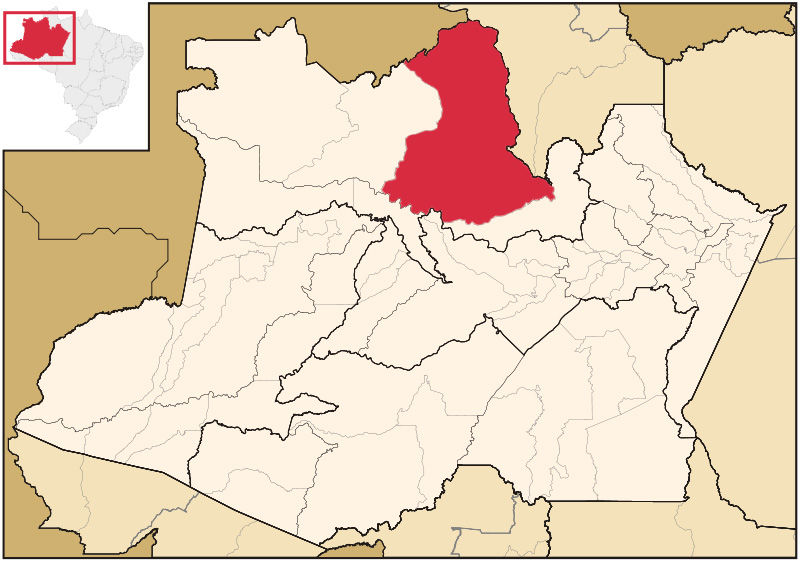
- Location of Barcelos in the State of Amazonas

- Location in Brazil
- Coordinates: 00°58′30″S 62°55′26″W
- Country: Brazil
- Region: North
- State: Amazonas
- Founded: May 27, 1758

Government
  - Mayor: José Ribamar Beleza (MDB)

Area
  - Total: 122,475.728 km^{2} (47,288.143 sq mi)

Population (2020)
  - Total: 27,638
  - Density: 0.21/km^{2} (0.54/sq mi)
- Time zone: UTC−4 (AMT)
- Area code: +55 92
- HDI (2000): 0.593 – medium

Barcelos (also Barcellos), formerly Mariuá, is a municipality located in the state of Amazonas, northern Brazil. Its population was 27,638 (2020) and its area is 122,476 square kilometres (47,288 mi^{2}). It is the second largest municipality in Brazil (behind Altamira, Pará), equivalent in size to New York state in the United States and slightly larger than North Korea.

Since 1994, Barcelos has been the host of an annual festival celebrating ornamental fish, which is a significant source of income for the region. Project Piaba uses Barcelos as the starting point for their annual research expedition into the Rio Negro area. The region is the biggest exporter of this particular fish in Brazil with over 19 million specimens exported into Europe, Asia, and the United States. Barcelos is known for Ecotourism.

== History ==
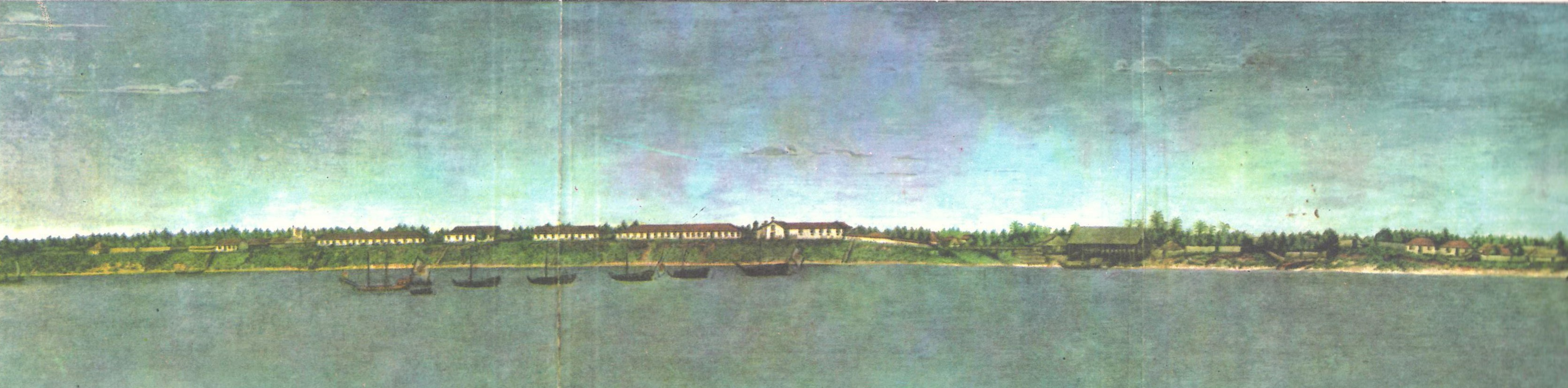
Barcelos, 1783–1792

Barcelos was originally named Mariuá, village of the Manaus Indians. When the captaincy of São José do Rio Negro was formed in 1755, Francisco Xavier de Mendonça Furtado, Governor General of state of Grao Para e Maranhao chose the aldeia de São José do Javari, a village founded by Carmelite Friar Matias São Boaventuras in 1728 near the mouth of the Javari River, as its capital. It was the capital of the captaincy of São José do Rio Negro from 1755 to 1791, and again from 1799 to 1808.

== Geography ==
The municipality area is 122,476 square kilometres (47,288 sq mi), making it the second largest municipality in Brazil (behind Altamira, Pará), equivalent in size to New York state in the United States and slightly larger than North Korea. The municipality contains part of the Amanã Sustainable Development Reserve. It also contains part of the Amazonas National Forest. It contains the 833,352-hectare (2,059,260-acre) Rio Unini Extractive Reserve, created in 2006.

=== Climate ===
The climate reflects its vegetation being tropical rainforest or equatorial (Köppen: Af), like the rest of the Amazon Basin.

Climate data for Barcelos (1991–2020)
Month	Jan	Feb	Mar	Apr	May	Jun	Jul	Aug	Sep	Oct	Nov	Dec	Year
Mean daily maximum °C (°F)	32.7 (90.9)	32.6 (90.7)	32.2 (90.0)	31.8 (89.2)	31.3 (88.3)	31.6 (88.9)	31.9 (89.4)	32.8 (91.0)	33.4 (92.1)	33.6 (92.5)	33.3 (91.9)	33.0 (91.4)	32.5 (90.5)
Daily mean °C (°F)	27.1 (80.8)	27.0 (80.6)	26.8 (80.2)	26.5 (79.7)	26.3 (79.3)	26.2 (79.2)	26.3 (79.3)	26.8 (80.2)	27.1 (80.8)	27.3 (81.1)	27.2 (81.0)	27.3 (81.1)	26.8 (80.2)
Mean daily minimum °C (°F)	23.4 (74.1)	23.4 (74.1)	23.3 (73.9)	23.2 (73.8)	23.1 (73.6)	22.9 (73.2)	22.7 (72.9)	22.9 (73.2)	23.0 (73.4)	23.3 (73.9)	23.2 (73.8)	23.4 (74.1)	23.2 (73.8)
Average precipitation mm (inches)	164.6 (6.48)	198.0 (7.80)	258.1 (10.16)	330.2 (13.00)	306.0 (12.05)	244.8 (9.64)	185.3 (7.30)	128.1 (5.04)	102.1 (4.02)	97.4 (3.83)	134.2 (5.28)	163.6 (6.44)	2,312.4 (91.04)
Average precipitation days (≥ 1.0 mm)	14	14	16	18	21	18	16	11	10	10	11	11	170
Average relative humidity (%)	85.9	85.4	87.4	88.8	90.3	89.1	87.3	85.6	85.4	85.3	86.2	85.3	86.8
Mean monthly sunshine hours	157.6	128.1	126.4	116.9	125.2	133.1	168.2	180.7	170.1	164.2	153.9	155.8	1,780.2
Source: Instituto Nacional de Meteorologia (sun 1981–2010)

== Transportation ==
The city is served by Barcelos Airport with scheduled services to Manaus.
