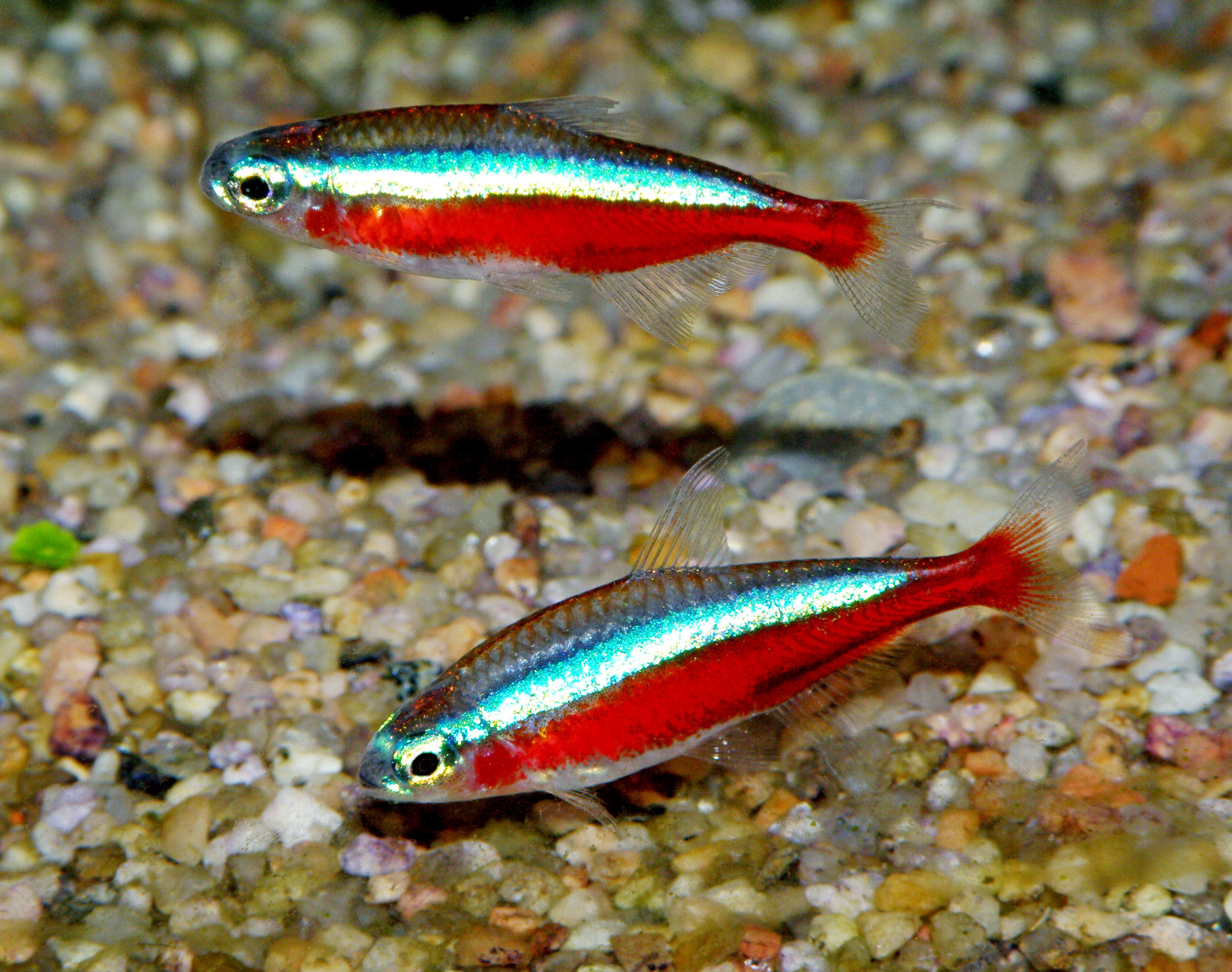

Conservation status
- Least Concern (IUCN 3.1)

Scientific classification
- Kingdom: Animalia
- Phylum: Chordata
- Class: Actinopterygii
- Division: Teleostei
- Order: Characiformes
- Family: Acestrorhamphidae
- Subfamily: Megalamphodinae
- Genus: Paracheirodon
- Species: P. axelrodi

Binomial name
- Paracheirodon axelrodi (L. P. Schultz, 1956)

Synonyms
- Cheirodon axelrodi Schultz, 1956; Hyphessobrycon cardinalis Myers & Weitzman, 1956

= Cardinal tetra =

Species of fish

The cardinal tetra (Paracheirodon axelrodi) is a species of freshwater fish of the family Acestrorhamphidae, the American characins, of order Characiformes. It is native to the upper Orinoco and Negro Rivers in South America. Growing to about 3 cm (1.2 in) in total length, the cardinal tetra has the striking iridescent blue line characteristic of the genus Paracheirodon laterally bisecting the fish, with the body below this line being vivid red in color, hence the name "cardinal tetra". The cardinal tetra's appearance is similar to that of the closely related neon tetra, with which it is often confused; the neon's red coloration extends only about halfway to the nose, and the neon's blue stripe is a less vibrant blue.

The cardinal tetra is a popular aquarium fish, but is less widespread than the neon tetra because until recently, it was difficult to breed in captivity. However, many breeders are now producing the fish; in most cases, one can determine if the cardinal tetra is bred or wild-caught due to damaged fins on wild-caught specimens. Some ichthyologists believe fishkeepers should continue to support the sustainable cardinal fishery of the Amazon Basin, since thousands of people work in the region to capture fish for the aquarium trade. If those fishermen lost their livelihoods catching cardinals and other tropical fish, they might turn their attention to engaging in deforestation.

== Taxonomy ==
American ichthyologist Leonard Peter Schultz described the cardinal tetra in 1956 as Cheirodon axelrodi. The specific epithet honors fishkeeping book publisher Herbert R. Axelrod. Hyphessobrycon cardinalis is an obsolete synonym. The fish's common name, cardinal tetra, refers to the brilliant red coloration, reminiscent of a cardinal's robes. P. axelrodi is also often called the red neon tetra.

The species exists in a number of different color forms or phenotypes. A "gold" and "silver-blonde" form exists in the Rio Negro drainage that has less blue in the longitudinal stripe. The normal form from the Rio Negro drainage has a blue stripe, which extends to the adipose fin, while the Orinoco drainage phenotype has a stripe that stops posterior to the adipose. The Orinoco phenotype may represent a subspecies of P. axelrodi.

== Description ==
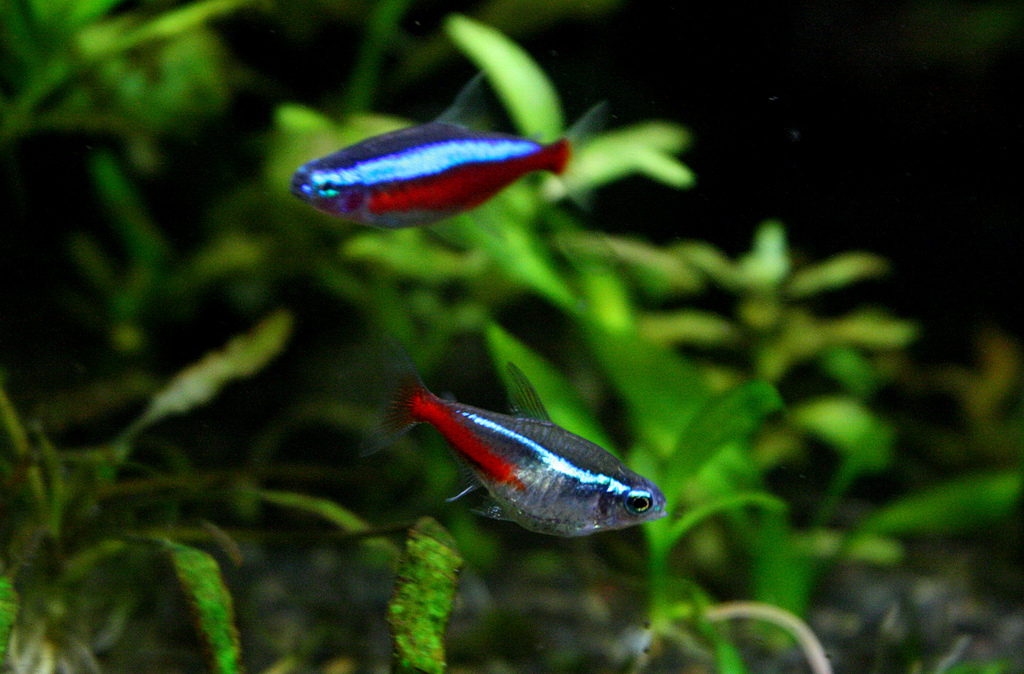
The cardinal tetra (above) has more red on the underside than the superficially similar neon tetra (below).

The cardinal tetra has bright red ventral parts and an iridescent blue line that runs horizontally along its body. The characteristic iridescence of this and related fishes, such as the neon tetra, is a structural color, caused by refraction of light within guanine crystals that develop within special cells called iridocytes in the subcutaneous layer. The exact shade of blue seen depends on the viewing angle of the viewer relative to the fish - if the viewpoint changes so as to look at the fish more from below, the color will change hue, becoming more deeply sapphire blue and even indigo. Change of viewpoint to one above the fishes, however, and the color becomes more greenish. Cardinal tetras appear to grow larger in captivity than they do in the wild. They have a large stomach and small gut.

== Distribution and habitat ==
Cardinal tetras are found in the upper Orinoco of Colombia and Venezuela, as well as the upper Rio Negro of Brazil.

== Ecology and behavior ==
=== Diet ===
The cardinal tetra forages in areas of slow-moving, shallow water. It is predominantly predatory, feeding on tiny animals found on underwater plants, roots, and leaf litter. Creatures commonly eaten include the larvae of chironomid midges and microcrustaceans such as water fleas (Cladocera) of the families Moinidae, Macrotrichidae, and Daphniidae, and copepods of the family Harpacticidae. Other organisms eaten include other fly larvae, insect eggs, rotifers, and testate amoebae.

=== Reproduction ===
In the wild, the cardinal tetra swims upstream in large numbers to parts of its native river habitat completely enclosed above by rainforest canopy. Such waters are subject to heavy shading by the rainforest trees, and virtually no sunlight reaches them. Here, the fishes spawn in large aggregations. If the fishes are ready to spawn, the male pursues the female into fine-leaved plants; her fuller outline, which usually indicates the presence of ripe eggs within her reproductive tract, should be readily apparent at this point. If the female is ready, she allows the male to swim alongside her, and together, the pair release eggs and sperm.

=== Lifespan ===
The fish might also be effectively an annual species with a lifespan of just a single year in nature. It lives for several years in captivity. For those seeking to breed them in the aquarium, the best way to do so is by mimicking the same natural setup. A study conducted in Manaus, Brazil, subjected cardinal tetras to adverse water conditions for 96 hours. The fish perished at a low temperature of 19.6 °C (67.3 °F) and a high of 33.7 °C (92.7 °F), and pH below 2.9 or above 8.8.

== In the aquarium trade ==
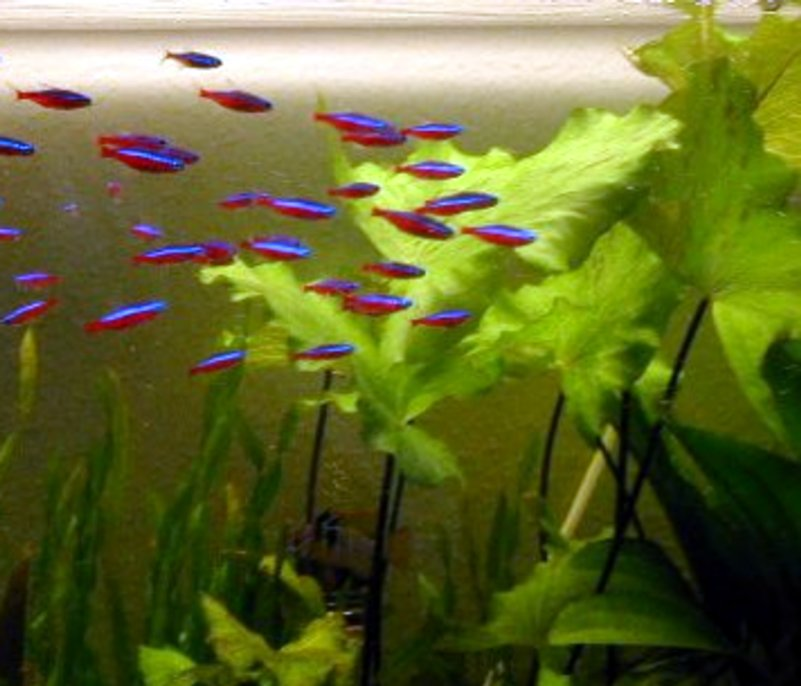
A shoal of cardinal tetras in an aquarium

An entire industry is in place in Barcelos on the banks of Brazil's Rio Negro in which the local population catches fish for the aquarium trade. The cardinal fishery here is highly valued by the local people who act as stewards for the environment. The local people may not become involved in potentially environmentally damaging activities, such as deforestation, because they can make a sustainable living from the fishery.

Between the years of 2006 to 2015, over 92,000,000 cardinal tetras were exported from the state of Amazonas, accounting for 64.57% of all ornamental fish exports from the state during this time. Another estimate suggests 20 million cardinal tetras are caught each year, and that even twice that would be easily sustainable. This is partly because there are so many of these fish in the wild, and because many uncaught wild fish die during the dry season.

== See also ==
- List of freshwater aquarium fish species
- Project Piaba
