= Observatoire océanologique de Banyuls-sur-Mer =

Marine station located in Banyuls-sur-Mer on the Mediterranean coast of France

Coordinates: 42.4806°N 3.1368°E

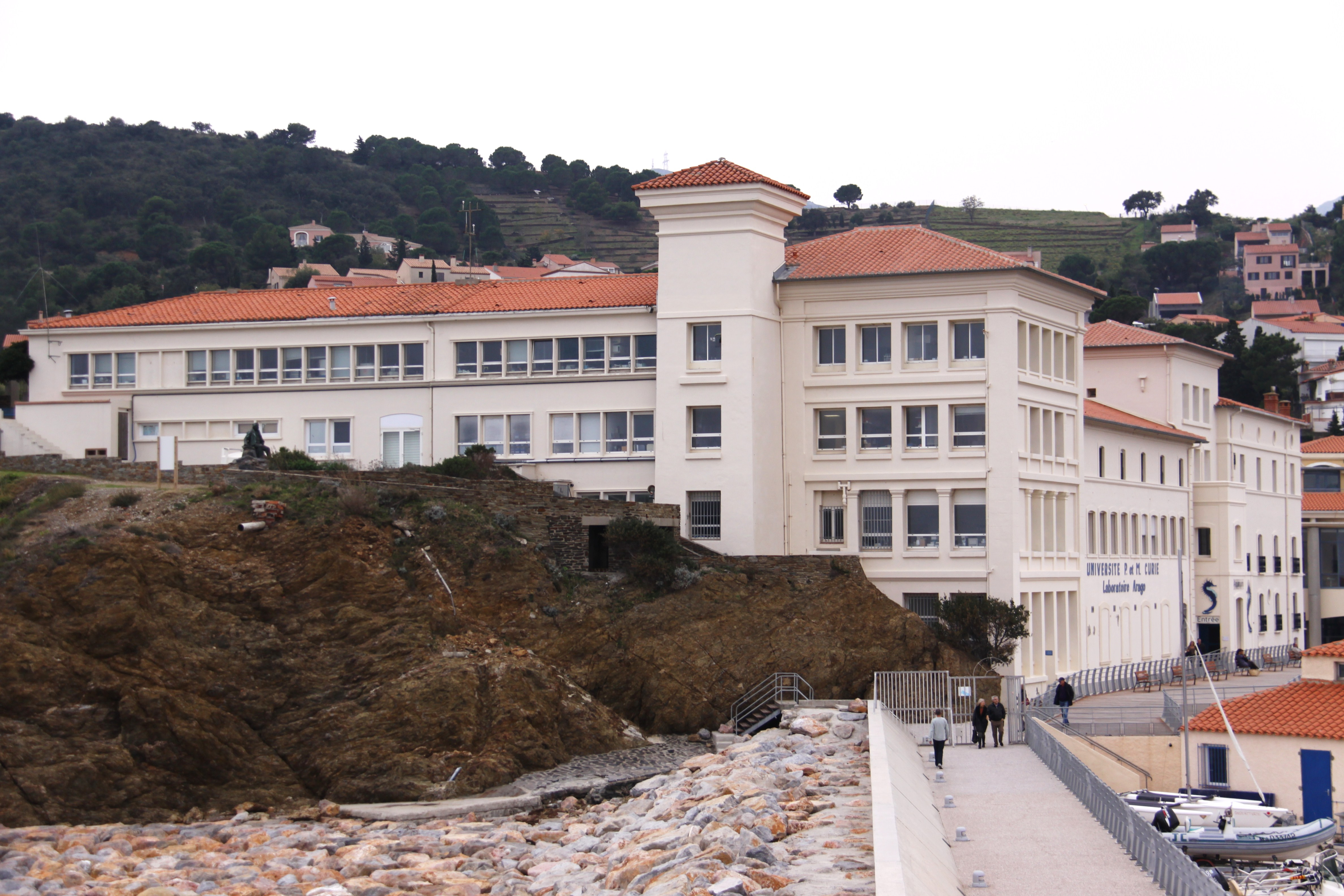
Observatoire océanologique de Banyuls-sur-Mer

The Observatoire océanologique de Banyuls-sur-Mer, also known as the Laboratoire Arago, is a marine station located in Banyuls-sur-Mer (Pyrénées-Orientales) on the Mediterranean coast of France. The marine station is made up of several joint research laboratories operated by UPMC-Paris 6 (Université Pierre et Marie Curie) and the Centre National de la Recherche Scientifique (CNRS) and one administrative unit. The buildings and land are part of the UPMC-Paris 6 campus.

The marine station also houses a small public aquarium and a public garden.

== History ==
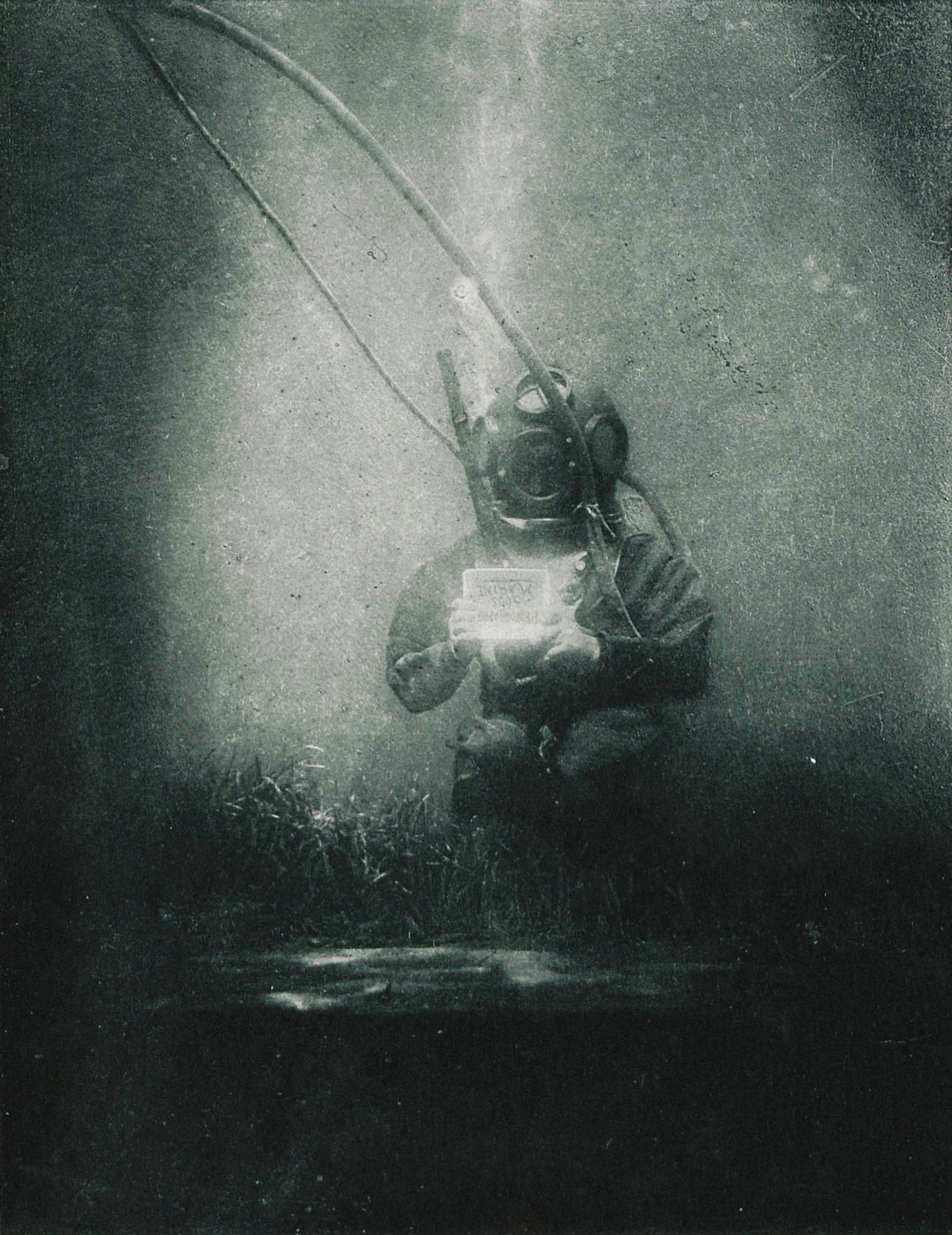
Mechanic Joseph David photographed by Louis Boutan in 1899 in Banyuls-sur-Mer.

The marine station was founded in 1881 by the biologist Henri de Lacaze-Duthiers.

After founding the Roscoff Marine Station on the English Channel in 1872, the Sorbonne zoologist, Professor Henri de Lacaze-Duthiers, wished to establish a second marine station on the Mediterranean. The site in Banyuls-sur-Mer was selected over another site in Port-Vendres because of a more favorable financial offer by the village. The public aquarium was in operation by 1885.

Construction of the main building began in 1881. The station officially opened in 1882 under the name of "Laboratoire Arago" named to honor François Arago, who was born in the same region.

Prince Roland Bonaparte offered a steamboat for the use of the laboratory in 1890. Named Roland, the ship was destroyed while in her basin in Banyuls during a storm in November 1908.

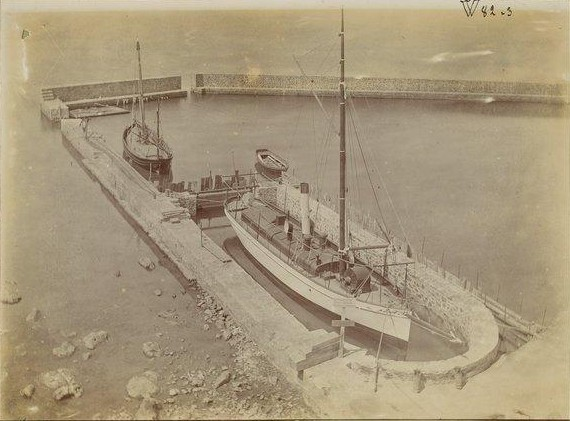
The Roland in her basin in 1895 in Banyuls

French marine biologist Louis Boutan perfected, while studying under de Lacaze-Duthiers, several techniques for underwater photography. He also developed an underwater flash and a remote control for deep waters using an electromagnet.

== Mission ==
The Laboratoire Arago and its two sister stations in Roscoff and Villefranche-sur-Mer, share two common missions: promoting education and research in marine sciences. All three sites maintain onsite dormitory and restaurant facilities available to visiting scientists and students in support of these missions.

== Directors ==
- 1882-1900: Henri de Lacaze-Duthiers
- 1900-1923: Georges Pruvot
- 1923-1937: Octavio Duboscq
- 1937-1947: Édouard Chatton
- 1947-1964: Georges Petit
- 1964-1976: Pierre Drach
- 1976-1989: Jacques Soyer
- 1989-1999: Alain Guille
- 2000-2005: Gilles Boeuf
- 2005-2015: Philippe Lebaron
- 2015-: Vincent Laudet
