= Java moss =

Java moss is a common name for multiple plants and may refer to:

- Taxiphyllum barbieri
- Vesicularia dubyana
