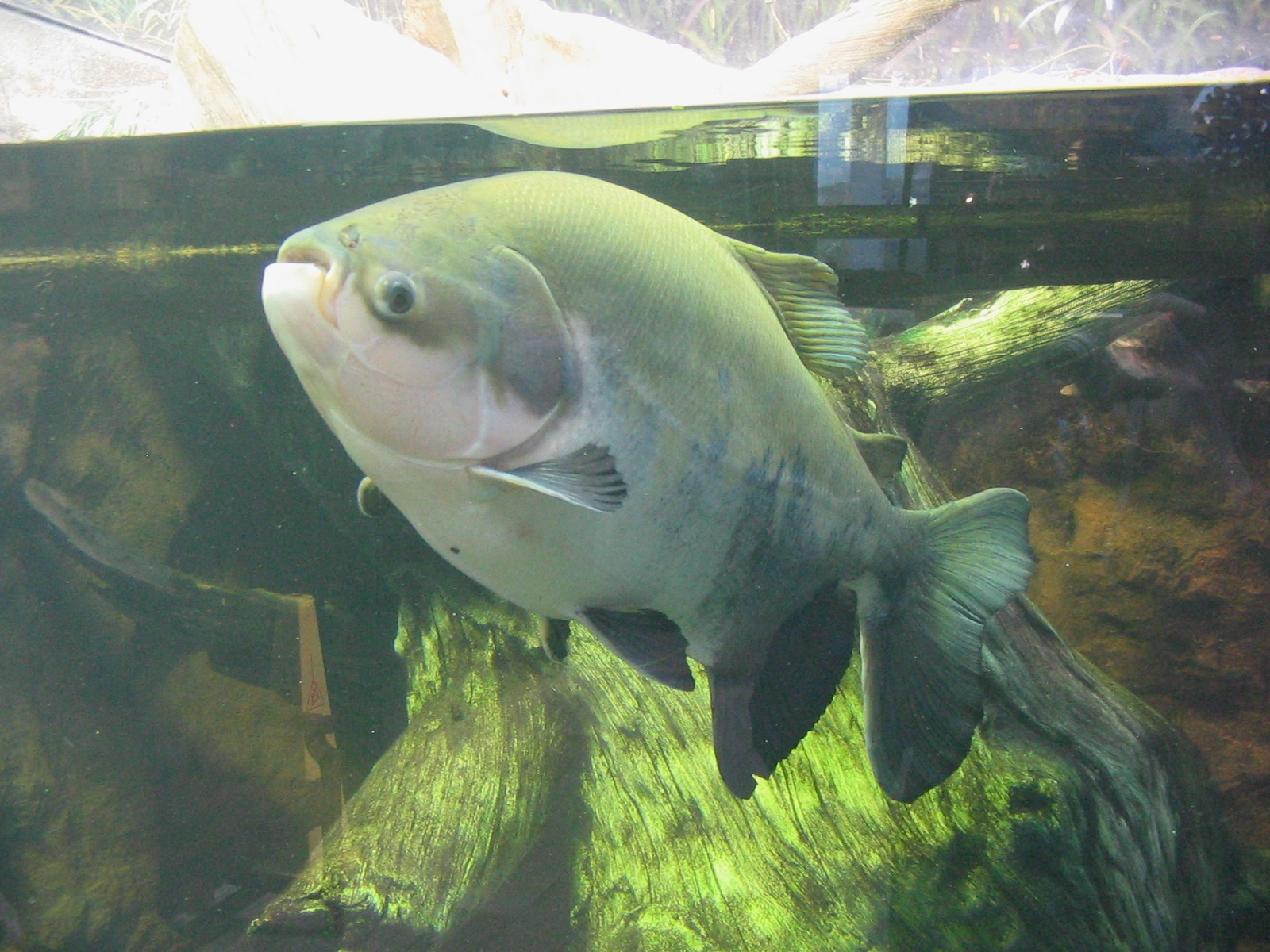
- Tambaqui at the Shedd Aquarium

Scientific classification
- Kingdom: Animalia
- Phylum: Chordata
- Class: Actinopterygii
- Division: Teleostei
- Order: Characiformes
- Family: Serrasalmidae

Genera
- Colossoma; Metynnis; Mylesinus; Myloplus; Mylossoma; Ossubtus; Paramyloplus; Piaractus; Prosomyleus; Tometes; Utiaritichthys

= Pacu =

Common name for several species of fish

Pacu (Portuguese pronunciation: [paˈku]) is a common name used to refer to several species of omnivorous South American freshwater serrasalmid fish related to piranhas. Pacu and piranha do not have similar teeth, the main difference being jaw alignment; piranha have pointed, razor-sharp teeth in a pronounced underbite, whereas pacu have squarer, straighter teeth and a less severe underbite or a slight overbite. Pacu, unlike piranha, mainly feed on plant material and not flesh or scales. Additionally, the pacu can reach much larger sizes than piranha, up to 1.08 m (3 ft 6 1/2 in) in total length and 40 kg (88 lb) in weight.

== Name ==
The common name pacu is generally applied to fish classified under the below listed genera. Among these, several genera contain species where commonly used English names include the word pacu, as listed.

- Subfamily Colossomatinae
  - Colossoma – black pacu, black-finned pacu, giant pacu
  - Mylossoma
  - Piaractus – red-bellied pacu, small-scaled pacu
- Subfamily Myleinae
  - Mylesinus
  - Myleus
  - Myloplus
  - Ossubtus – parrot pacu, eaglebeak pacu
  - Paramyloplus
  - Prosomyleus
  - Tometes
  - Utiaritichthys
- Subfamily Serrasalminae
  - Metynnis

Each of these groups contains one or more separate species. For example, the fish often found in pet stores, known as the black pacu and red-bellied pacu, typically belong to the species Colossoma macropomum and Piaractus brachypomus, respectively. A species popular among fish farmers is Piaractus mesopotamicus, also known as Paraná River pacu or small-scaled pacu.

Pacu is a term of Tupi-Guaraní origin. When the large fish of the genus Colossoma entered the aquarium trade in the U.S. and other countries, they were labeled pacu. In the Brazilian Amazon, the term pacu is generally reserved to smaller and medium-sized fish in the Metynnis, Mylossoma, Mylesinus and Myleus genera. Colossoma macropomum are known as tambaqui, whereas Piaractus brachypomus is known as pirapitinga. In Peru, both of the species (Colossoma macropomum and Piaractus brachypomum) are called pacú and gamitana. Piaractus mesopotamicus of the Paraná-Paraguay basin is also called pacú in Paraguay and Argentina.

== Classification ==
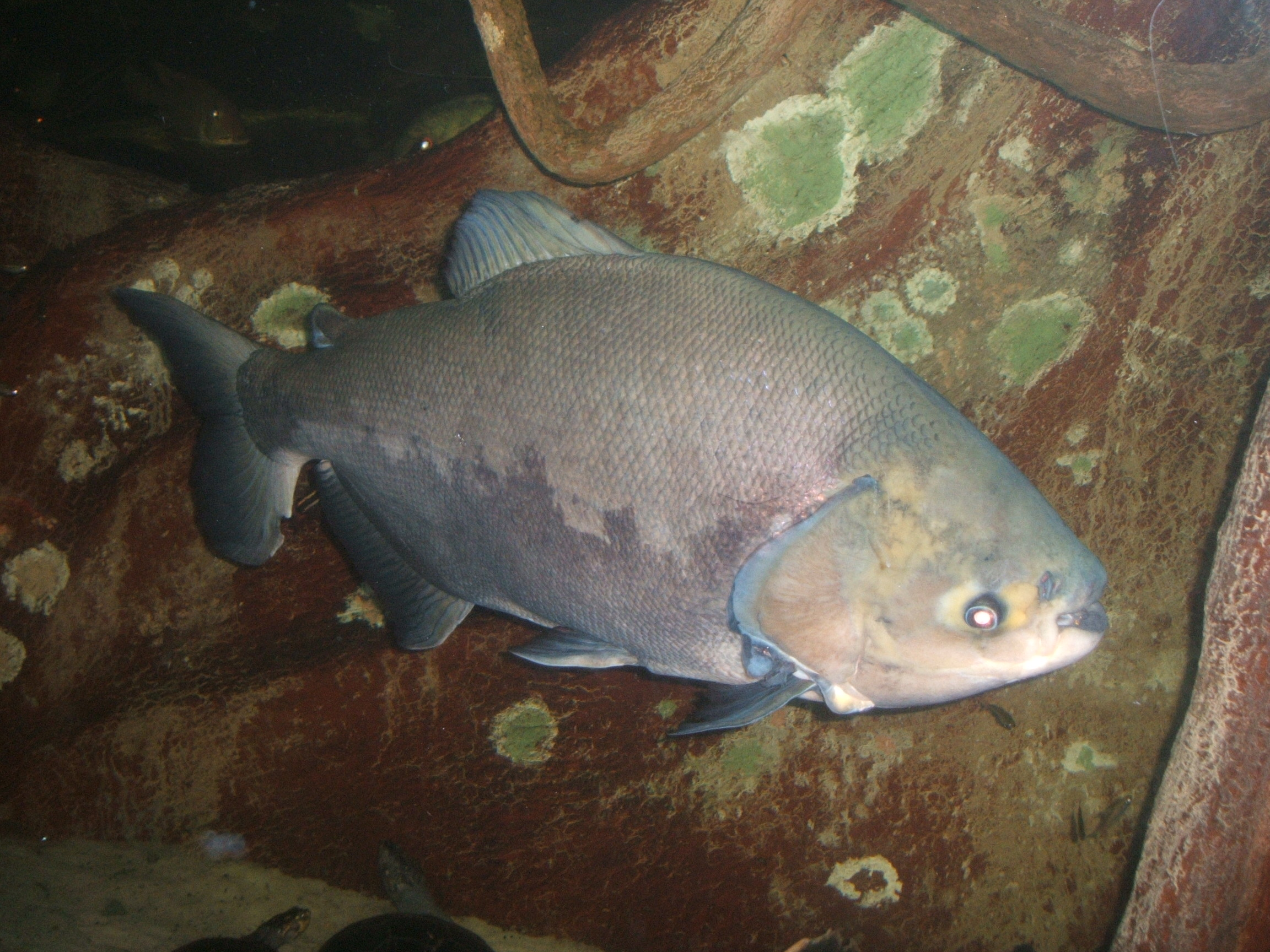
Colossoma macropomum (black pacu), at the New England Aquarium

Pacu, along with their piranha relatives, are a characin fish, meaning a kind of tetra, belonging to the Characiformes order. The ongoing classification of these fish is difficult and often contentious, with ichthyologists basing ranks according to characteristics that may overlap irregularly. DNA research sometimes confounds rather than clarifies species ranking. Ultimately, classifications can be rather arbitrary.

Pacu, along with piranha, are currently further classified into the family Serrasalmidae (formerly a subfamily of Characidae). Serrasalmidae means "serrated salmon family" and refers to the serrated keel running along the belly of these fish. However, dental characteristics and feeding habits further separate the two groups from each other.

== Native distribution and habitat ==
Pacus are native to tropical and subtropical South America. They inhabit rivers, lakes, floodplains and flooded forests in the Amazon, Orinoco, São Francisco River and Río de la Plata Basins, as well as rivers in the Guianas. Here they form part of the highly diverse Neotropical fish fauna. Their habitat preferences varies significantly depending on the exact species. Several species are migratory.

== As exotic species ==
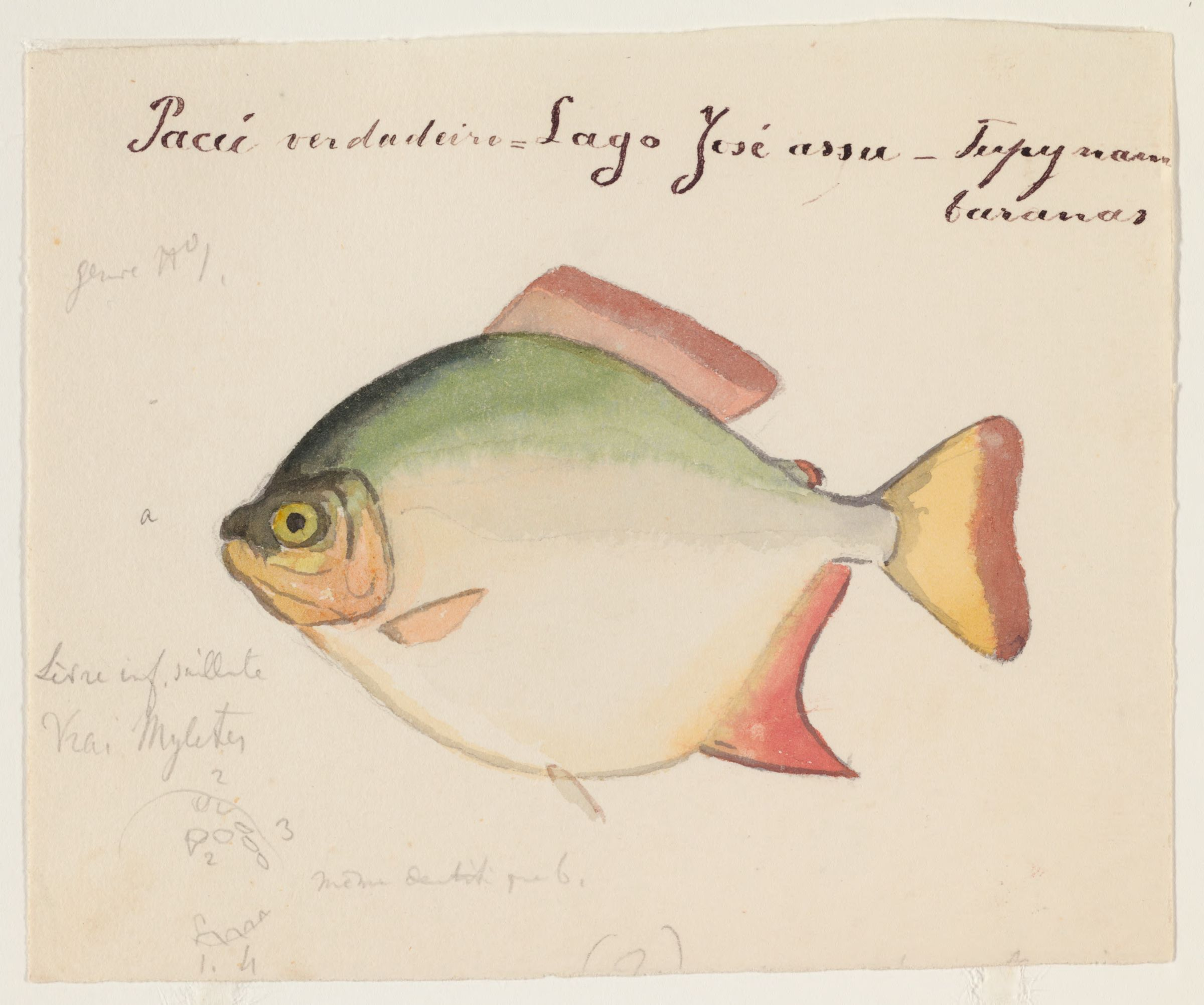
19th century watercolor of a Pacu painted by Jacques Burkhardt

Pacus have been introduced to the wild in many places outside their native range, both in South America and other continents. They are sometimes released to increase the local fishing, but others are released by aquarists when they outgrow their aquarium. This is illegal in many countries and strongly advised against. When becoming established they can be invasive species that damage the local ecosystem. In many regions where individuals have been seen they are unlikely to survive long-term because of temperature. Among the large pacu species (Colossoma and Piaractus), the most cold-adapted species is Piaractus mesopotamicus, which tolerates water down to 15 °C (59 °F), but stops feeding below 18 °C (64 °F).

=== United States ===
Pacus have become established in Puerto Rico and singles have been caught in numerous U.S. states. Discoveries have been reported in Alabama, Arizona, Arkansas, California, Colorado, Florida, Georgia, Hawaii, Iowa, Idaho, Illinois, Indiana, Kansas, Kentucky, Maine, Maryland, Massachusetts, Michigan, Minnesota, Mississippi, Missouri, Nebraska, New Hampshire, New Jersey, New York, North Carolina, North Dakota, Ohio, Oklahoma, Pennsylvania, South Carolina, Texas, Utah, Washington, Wisconsin, and Wyoming. Among the numerous recent records are a pacu caught in the California Delta, near Stockton in 2015, two in Lake St. Clair in 2016 and a single in Lake Huron in 2016.

Some state wildlife authorities have advised home aquarists who wish to get rid of overgrown pacu to cut the heads off the fish and dispose of them as garbage. Habitattitude, a U.S. national initiative led by the Aquatic Nuisance Species (ANS) Task Force, recommends humanely disposing the fish through a veterinarian or pet retailer, returning them to retailers, or donating them to a local aquarium society, school, or aquatic business. Additionally, aquarium-raised fish can be eaten (see Food fish).

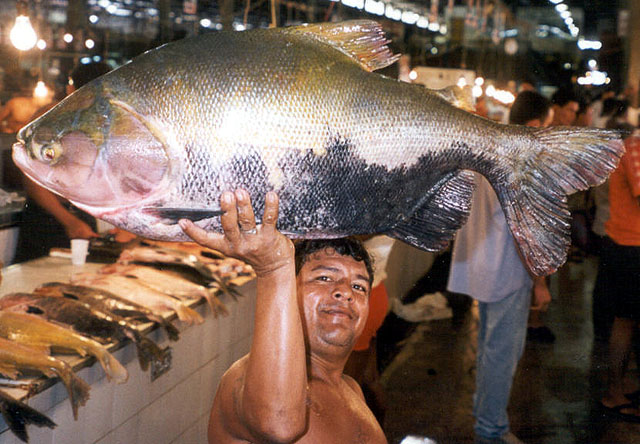
Colossoma macropomum, a pacu, for sale in the Manaus Fish Market, Brazil. This fish was approximately 85 cm (33 1/2 in) long.

=== Europe ===
In August 2013, a pacu was discovered in Scandinavian waters; a fisherman pulled a 21 cm (8 1/2 in) specimen from the Øresund, a semi-brackish strait between Sweden and Denmark.

An angler fishing on the river Seine in Paris, France, caught a pacu in August 2013.

In June 2016, a 20 cm (8 in) pacu was caught in a city pond in Tula, Russia.

In June 2017, a pacu was accidentally caught during a fishing contest at the Port of Drobeta Turnu Severin, Romania. The fish bit one of the fishermen, leading to a general warning being issued in the region, until the origin of the fish can be determined.

In August 2017, a pacu was caught in the stream Motala Ström in Norrköping, Sweden.

In July 2019, two pacus were caught near Baia Mare, Romania.

In September 2020, a 50 cm (20 in) pacu weighing approx. 3 kg (7 lb) was caught in Zegrze Reservoir in Poland.

In February 2024, a dead pacu was found in Garadice Lough, Ireland.

In Summer 2025 a pacu got fished out of the Jagst River near Crailsheim in southern Germany.

=== Asia ===
Pacus have become established in tropical Asia, including Vietnam, Malaysia, Bangladesh, Thailand, and India.

=== New Guinea ===
Pacu were introduced in 1994 to the Sepik River, and in 1997 to the Ramu river as a food source, due to overfishing of native species. Local people blame the fish for outcompeting native species, including juvenile crocodiles, as well as for several attacks on humans. As a primarily vegetarian fish, red-bellied pacu, have also consumed the floating mats of vegetation in the Sepik River, which operated as fish nurseries and crocodile and bird nesting sites. Thus the entire ecosystem has become impoverished and local people cannot subsist as easily as they once did.

== Importance to humans ==
In their native range, pacus are widely fished and farmed. Based on a study by IBAMA, Colossoma macropomum, Piaractus brachypomus and Mylossoma spp. are all in the top-15 of the most caught fish (by weight) in the Brazilian Amazon.

=== Aquaria ===
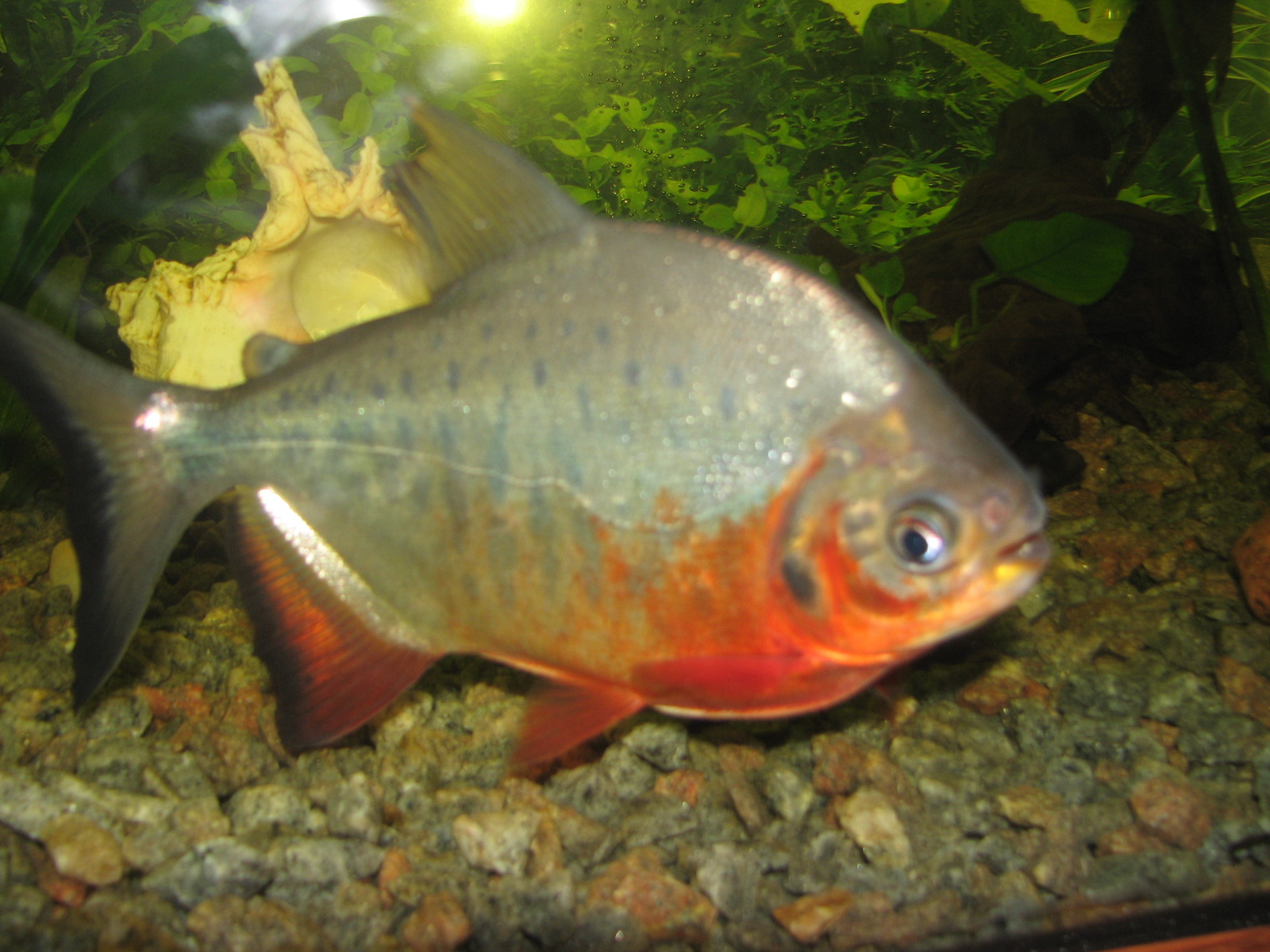
A young red-bellied pacu

Pacu are commonly sold as "vegetarian piranhas" to home aquarium owners. With the proper equipment and commitment, pacu have been known to make responsive pets. One such example was Swish, a 75-cm (30-inch) pacu owned for over 20 years by a Chinese restaurant (Kau Kau) in the Chinatown district in Seattle, Washington; one aquarium technician said of Swish, "He'd rub his body on your arms, kind of like a dog."

However, there is some question of whether the fish are a good choice for the typical aquarist. While they are not aggressive carnivores like the piranha, their crushing jaw system, used primarily for eating seeds and nuts, can be hazardous. One toddler needed surgery after a pacu (misreported as a piranha) bit her finger at Edinburgh Butterfly and Insect World in Scotland. Commenting on the incident, Deep Sea World zoological manager Matthew Kane warned, "Pacus will eat anything, even children's wiggling fingers."

If a large population of pacu enters an ecosystem to which it is not native, the fish can have a very adverse effect. Pet stores sell pacu as small as 5–8 cm (2–3 in) long and neglect to warn customers that fish growth is not inhibited by tank size, contrary to popular fish lore. "Most UK dealers now refuse to stock this species due to the large size and expensive aquarium requirements it demands," according to Practical Fishkeeping magazine's Matt Clarke. Incapable of maintaining large aquaria, overwhelmed hobbyists are suspected of illegally releasing their pacu into wild waterways. As tropical fish, pacu will die in cold weather; as newcomers to an ecosystem, pacu may out-compete native species for available food, habitat, and other resources, or displace them by introducing exotic parasites or diseases. Most wildlife resource authorities prohibit releasing exotic fish, including pacu, into the wild. Officials of one Texas lake have put a $100 bounty on the pacu caught there.

=== Game fish ===
In Appendix B of Through the Brazilian Wilderness (see also online version), Theodore Roosevelt advised, "For small fish like the pacu and piranha an ordinary bass hook will do." Concerning the pacu, he added:

"A light rod and reel would be a convenience in catching the pacu. We used to fish for the latter variety in the quiet pools while allowing the canoe to drift, and always saved some of the fish as bait for the big fellows. We fished for the pacu as the native does, kneading a ball of mandioc farina with water and placing it on the hook as bait. I should not be surprised, though, if it were possible, with carefully chosen flies, to catch some of the fish that every once in a while we saw rise to the surface and drag some luckless insect under."

More recently, South American rivers including the Amazon have become a popular destination for recreational anglers, who go to fly fish for pacu. The International Game Fish Association has sponsored fly-fishing courses for native Brazilian fishermen, typically accustomed to subsistence fishing, so they can work as guides to fishing tourists.

When bait-fishing in pacu-stocked ponds, anglers in Malaysia are advised to use circle hooks, size 2 or larger, and braided leather rather than nylon leaders which are easily broken by the pacu's teeth. Since pond pacu often nibble at the bait before taking it, anglers should let them swim away with the bait. If the angler simply allows the line to tighten, the circle hook will slide to the side of the fish's mouth and embed its point there.

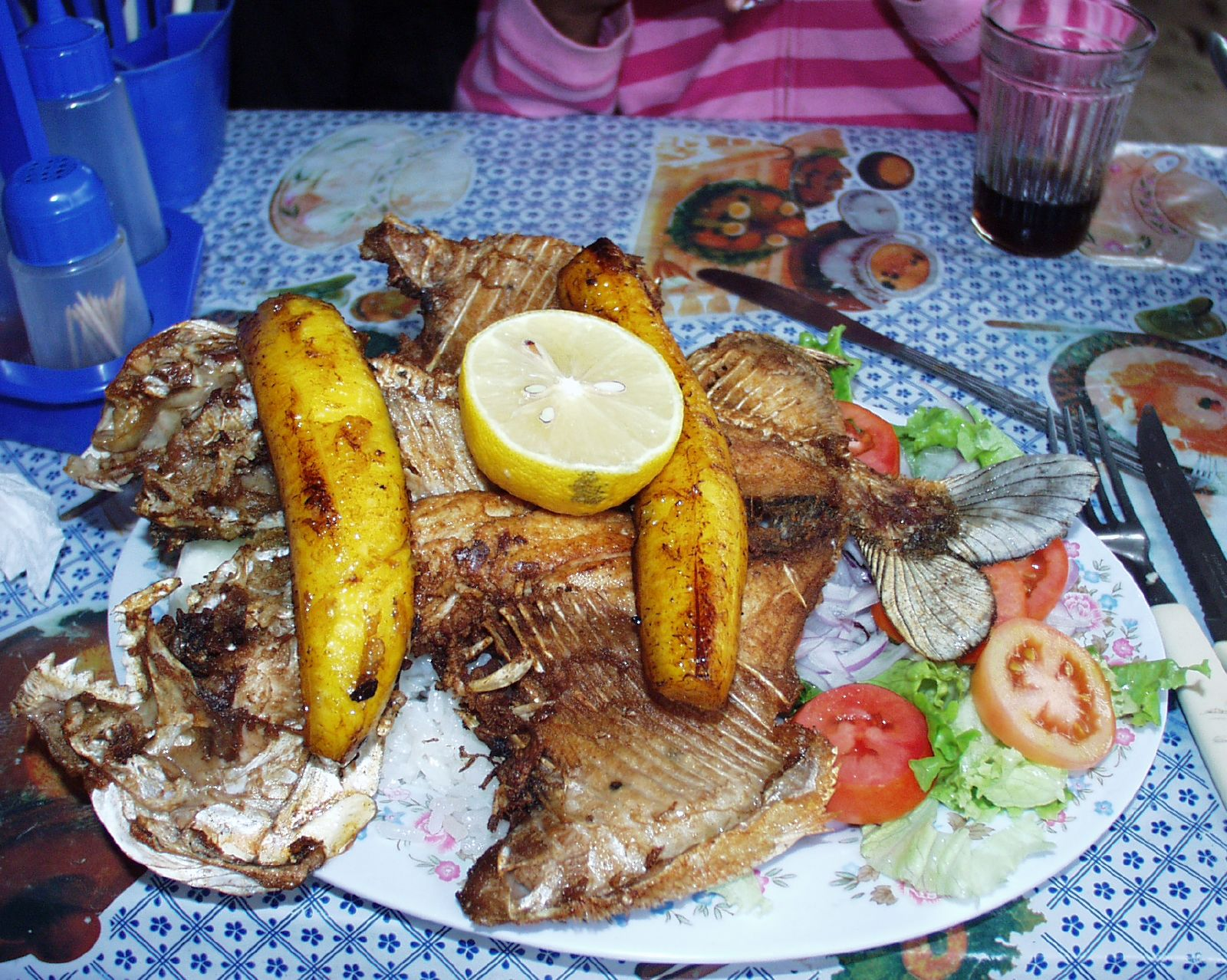
Grilled pacu over rice with sides of lettuce, tomato, onions, and plantains, with a lemon-half garnish. Photograph taken in Villa Tunari, Bolivia, by Marc Alan Davis.

=== Food fish ===
Theodore Roosevelt wrote of catching and eating pacu in his book Through the Brazilian Wilderness. He described them as "good-sized, deep-bodied fish," and noted, "They were delicious eating."

Today, the Amazon river is experiencing a crisis of overfishing. Both subsistence fishers and their commercial rivals compete in netting large quantities of pacu, which bring good prices at markets in Brazil and abroad.

Aquaculture may relieve the overfishing crisis, as well as improve food security by boosting fish supplies. Various species of pacu are increasingly being used for warm-water farm fishing around the world. Pacu are considered ideal for their tolerance of the low-oxygen water in farm ponds. They also don't require a lot of expensive protein in their diet, and can be raised year-round in warm or temperature-controlled environments.

Research shows that the "flavor of [farmed] pacu is comparable to that of hybrid striped bass, tilapia, and rainbow trout, but superior to catfish." In South America, pacu are prized for their sweet, mild flavor.

Aquarium-raised pacu can be cooked and eaten, but care should be taken to ensure that no toxic medications were used in the aquarium. A recipe and preparation instructions are provided on the Greater Seattle Aquarium Society's Web site.

== Incorrect claim of testicle-biting ==
In 2013, a pacu was caught in the Øresund Sound, a strait between Sweden and Denmark. This led to media reports mistakenly warning that the fish could attack testicles. The reports were based on a joke (referring to their actual feeding on tree nuts) that was not meant to be taken seriously. Nevertheless, their very strong jaws made for crushing plant seeds and the like means that fishermen and aquarists sometimes are warned about the powerful bite that may cause traumatic injuries.
