= Palometa =

Palometa is a name used for several species of fish:

Freshwater

- Catoprion mento, the wimple piranha from several South American river basins
- Metynnis, a genus of serrasalmid from several South American river basins
- Myloplus rubripinnis, the redhook myleus from several South American river basins
- Mylossoma, a genus of serrasalmid from several South American river basins
- Pristobrycon striolatus, a piranha from the Amazon and Orinoco Basins
- Pygocentrus cariba, the black spot piranha from the Orinoco and Llanos
- Pygocentrus nattereri, the red-bellied piranha from several South American river basins
- Pygocentrus palometa, a piranha from the Orinoco Basin
- Pygopristis denticulata, a piranha from several South American river basins
- Serrasalmus, a genus of piranha from several South American river basins

Marine

- Beryx, a genus of alfonsinos
- Brama, a genus of pomfrets
- Maracaibo leatherjacket, Oligoplites palometa, a species in the genus Oligoplites
- Taractichthys, a genus of pomfrets
- Trachinotus goodei, a Caribbean and West Atlantic gamefish

== See also ==
- Palometa River
