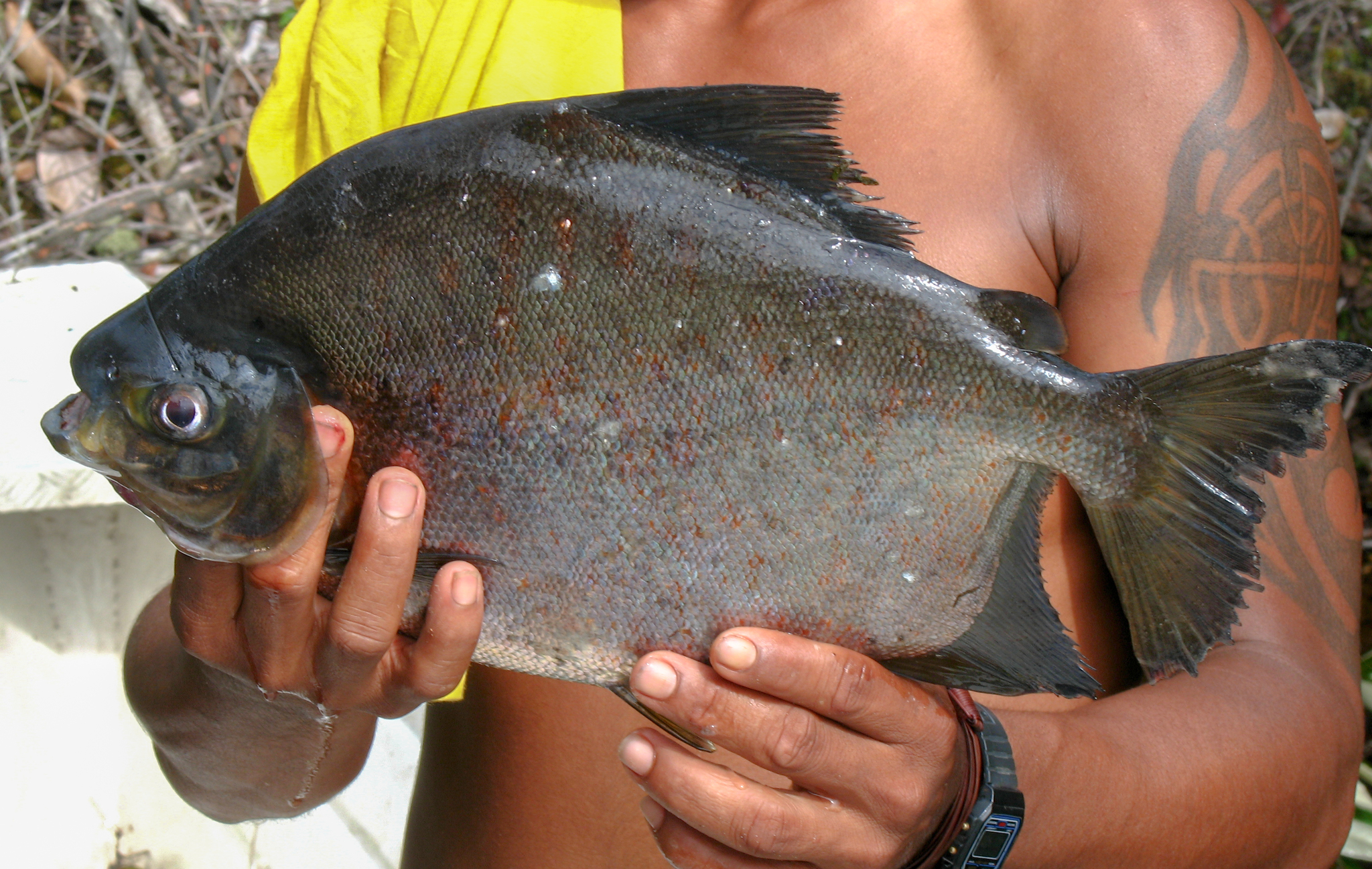

Scientific classification
- Kingdom: Animalia
- Phylum: Chordata
- Class: Actinopterygii
- Division: Teleostei
- Order: Characiformes
- Family: Serrasalmidae
- Subfamily: Myleinae
- Genus: Tometes; Valenciennes, 1850

Type species
- Tometes trilobatus Valenciennes, 1850

= Tometes =

Genus of fishes

Tometes is a genus of fish in the family Serrasalmidae found in fast-flowing rivers in northern South America. Adults of all seven species in this genus are phytophagous, feeding primarily on aquatic plants in the family Podostemaceae.

The genus name Tometes was coined in 1850 by Valenciennes in reference to the incisiform teeth. When the type species of the genus, T. trilobatus, was described in 1850, it was placed in synonym with Myleus setiger, the type species of the genus Myleus, which is why Tometes and Myleus were considered to be the same genus for a long time. It was just later that the two genera were revalitated and other specimen could be categorized in the genus Tometes.

== Taxonomy ==
Even today the taxonomic classification of the Serrasalmidae is not an easy task. Many names are placed in synonymy due to a lack of information and insufficient data bases. It was not long ago when it was discovered that Tometes and Myleus are two different genera but that Tometes, Myleus, Mylesinus and Ossubtus share a common ancestor. Typical characters of Tometes coincide with Mylesinus and Ossubtus specimen more than Myleus. It is further known that Tometes live in sympatry with other reophilic Serrasalmidae. Tometes species are also not to be mistaken with pacus, a vegetarian fish, which is often sold as a vegetarian piranha in the corresponding countries. One can easily distinguish one from another by their very different composition of their dentition.

== Description ==
Depending on the exact species, the maximum length of Tometes is between 28.3 and 91.1 cm (0.9–3.0 ft). They can weigh more than 5 kg (11 lb). The body color is generally gray or silvery, showing a brighter color at the bottom side. Their name was given due to their incisiform teeth, which are thicker and lower than in the other related genera. Also the teeth are placed side by side, are weakly attached to the jaw and are primarily used for cutting leaves. Sexually mature male of Tometes differ from females by an additional anal-fin lobe, an elongated dorsal fin or a red pattern on the body.

== Range, habitat and ecology ==
T. ancylorhynchus, T. kranponhah and T. siderocarajensis are found in clearwater rivers that originate in the Brazilian Shield (Xingu and Tocantins—Araguaia basins), T. camunani, T. lebaili and T. trilobatus are found in rivers of the eastern Guiana Shield (Trombetas, Commewijne, Mana, Maroni, Oyapock, Amapá Grande and Araguari basins), and T. makue is from the Rio Negro and Orinoco basins. These species all live in rapidly moving water with a rocky environment. A dense occurrence of Tometes larvae and juveniles in rapids around Podostemaceae plants, the main food source of adult Tometes, suggests that there is a positive rheotrophism (adaptability to fast-flowing water) in the larval stage. Unlike the strictly phytophagous adults, juveniles also feed on invertebrates. Their association with Podostemaceae plants restricts their distributions, which makes them vulnerable to the loss of rapids by the introduction of hydroelectric dams. In a cultural aspect rheophilic serrasalmids (notably Tometes, Myloplus and Mylesinus) are important in the tradition of local communities.

== Species ==
There are currently 7 recognized species in this genus:

- Tometes ancylorhynchus M. C. Andrade, Jégu & Giarizzo, 2016
- Tometes camunani M. C. Andrade, Giarizzo & Jégu, 2013
- Tometes kranponhah M. C. Andrade, Jégu & Giarizzo, 2016
- Tometes lebaili Jégu, Keith & Belmont-Jégu, 2002
- Tometes makue Jégu, G. M. Santos & Belmont-Jégu, 2002
- Tometes siderocarajensis M. C. Andrade, Machado, Jégu, Farias & Giarrizzo, 2017
- Tometes trilobatus Valenciennes, 1850
