= Pygocentrus palometa =

Scientific classification
- Kingdom: Animalia
- Phylum: Chordata
- Class: Actinopterygii
- Order: Characiformes
- Family: Serrasalmidae
- Genus: Pygocentrus
- Species: P. palometa

Binomial name
- Pygocentrus palometa Valenciennes, 1850

Species of fish

Pygocentrus palometa is a species of piranha endemic to Venezuela, where it is restricted to the Orinoco Basin. Although recognized by FishBase, the scientific name may be a nomen dubium.

"Palometa" is a general common name used in South America for many serrasalmids, such as the black spot piranha, red-bellied piranha, redhook myleus, wimple piranha, Metynnis, Mylossoma, Pygopristis denticulata, Pristobrycon striolatus and Serrasalmus, as well as the unrelated marine fish Beryx, Brama, Trachinotus goodei and Taractichthys.
