= Rheophile =

Animal that prefers to live in fast-moving water

A rheophile is an animal that prefers to live in fast-moving water.

== Examples of rheophilic animals ==
=== Insects ===
- Many aquatic insects living in riffles require current to survive.
- Epeorus sylvicola, a rheophilic mayfly species (Ephemeroptera)
- Some African (Elattoneura) and Asian threadtail (Prodasineura) species

=== Birds ===
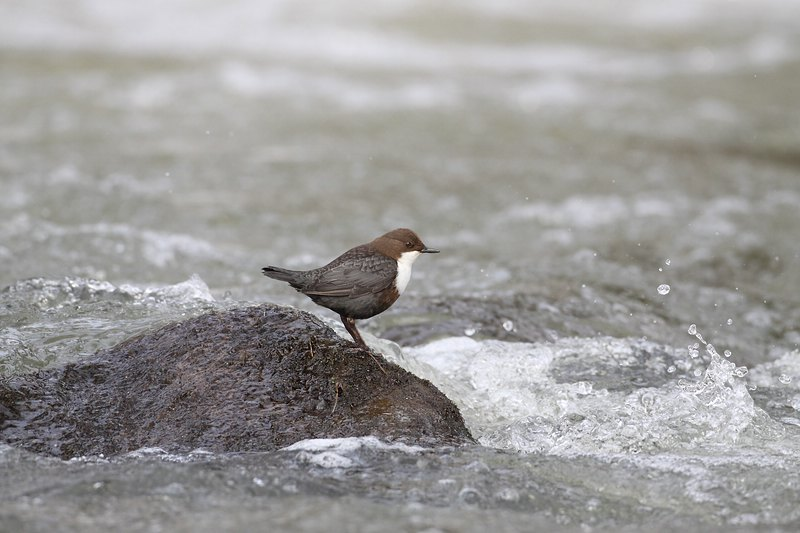

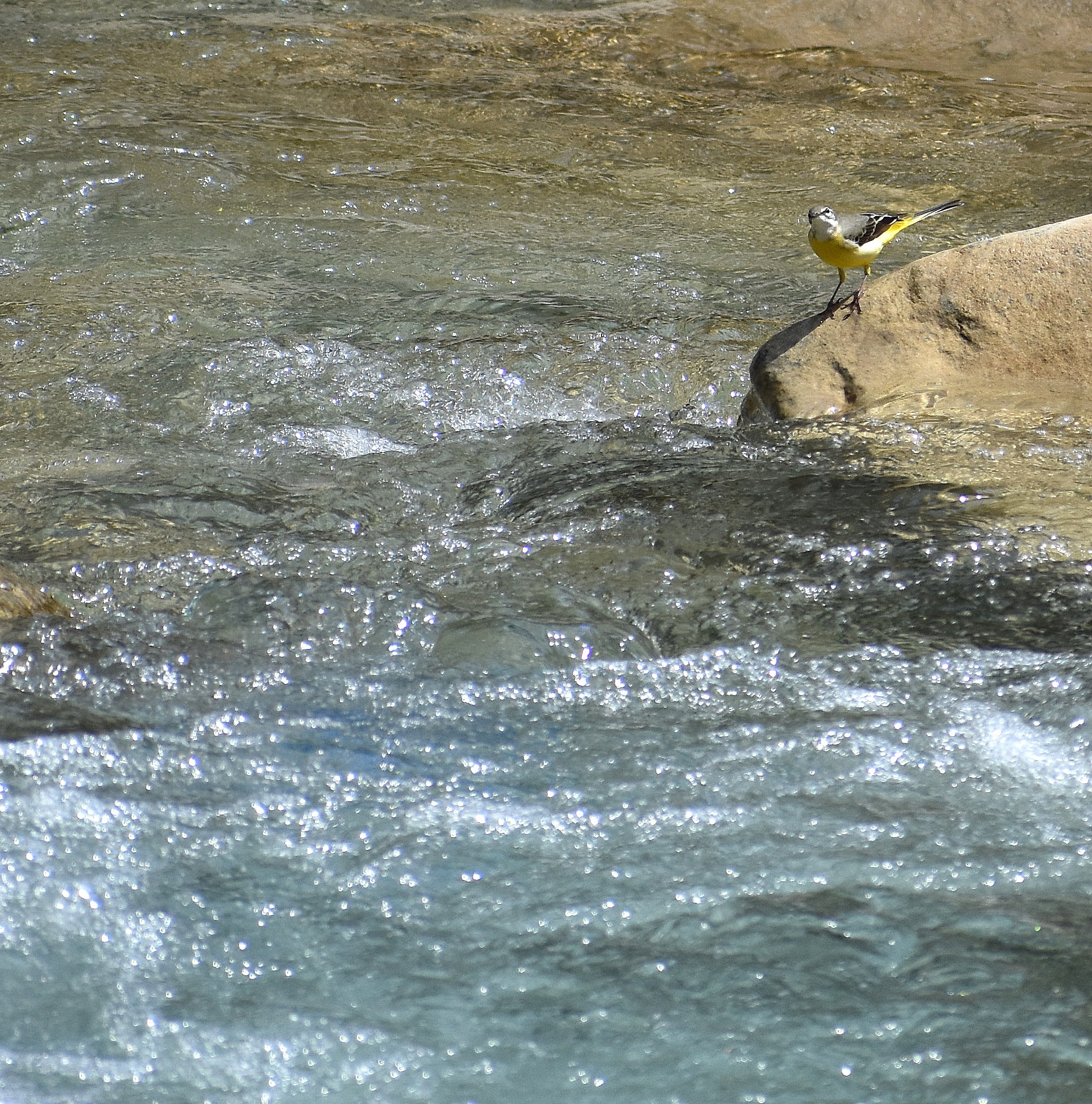
A white-throated dipper and grey wagtail, two avian rheophiles that forage at fast-running streams

- Dippers (Cinclus)
- Grey wagtail (Motacilla cinerea) and mountain wagtail (Motacilla clara)
- A few swifts often nest behind waterfalls, including American black swift (Cypseloides niger), giant swiftlet (Hydrochous gigas), great dusky swift (Cypseloides senex) and white-collared swift (Streptoprocne zonaris)
- Some waterfowl, including African black duck (Anas sparsa), blue duck (Hymenolaimus malacorhynchos), Brazilian merganser (Mergus octosetaceus), bronze-winged duck (Speculanas specularis), harlequin duck (Histrionicus histrionicus), Salvadori's teal (Salvadorina waigiuensis) and torrent duck (Merganetta armata)

=== Fish ===
A very large number of rheophilic fish species are known, including members of at least 419 genera in 60 families. Examples include:

- Many species in the family Balitoridae, also known as the hill stream loaches.
- Many species in the family Loricariidae from South and Central America
- Many Chiloglanis species, which are freshwater catfish from Africa
- The family Gyrinocheilidae.
- Rheophilic cichlid genera/species:
  - The Lamena group in the genus Paretroplus from Madagascar.
  - Oxylapia polli from Madagascar.
  - Retroculus species from the Amazon Basin and rivers in the Guianas in South America.
  - Steatocranus species from the Congo River Basin in Africa.
  - Teleocichla species from the Amazon Basin in South America.
  - Teleogramma species from the Congo River Basin in Africa.
- Mylesinus, Myleus, Ossubtus, Tometes and Utiaritichthys, which are serrasalmids from tropical South America
- The Danube streber (Zingel streber), family Percidae.

=== Molluscs ===
- Ancylus fluviatilis
- Aylacostoma species
- Lymnaea ovata

=== Amphibians ===
- Neurergus strauchii, a newt from Turkey
- Pachytriton labiatus, a newt from China
- Cryptobranchus alleganensis, the hellbender.

== See also ==
- Lotic ecosystem
