= Myleus planquettei =

Conservation status
- Vulnerable (IUCN 3.1)

Scientific classification
- Kingdom: Animalia
- Phylum: Chordata
- Class: Actinopterygii
- Order: Characiformes
- Family: Serrasalmidae
- Genus: Myleus
- Species: M. planquettei

Binomial name
- Myleus planquettei (Jégu, Keith & Le Bail, 2003)

Synonyms
- Myloplus planquettei Jégu, Keith & Le Bail, 2003

Species of fish

Myleus planquettei is a species of freshwater ray-finned fish belonging to the family Serrasalmidae, which includes the pacus and piranhas. This species is found in northern South America.

== Taxonomy ==
Myleus planquettei was first formally described as Myloplus planquettei in 2003 by Michel Jégu, Philippe Keith and Pierre-Yves Le Bail, with its type locality given as the Maroni River at Twenke in French Guiana. In 2021, this species was reclassified as belonging to the genus Myleus because it was found to be deeply nested within the clade which includes Myleus setiger, the type species of Myleus. The genus Myleus is the type genus of the subfamily Myleinae, of the family Serrasalmidae, which is classified in the suborder Characoidei of the order Characiformes.

== Etymology ==
Myleus planquettei is now classified in the genus Myleus, a name derived from the Greek mýlos, which means "mill", referring to the disc-like shape of M. setiger, like that of a millstone. The specific name honours Paul Planquette (1940-1996), of the Institut National de la Recherche Agronomique in Kourou, French Guiana, in recognition of his work studying the fishes of French Guiana.

== Description ==
Myleus planquettei has a laterally compressed, deep body with a maximum published standard length of 58 cm (23 in). There are between 20 and 23 soft rays supporting the dorsal fin, and the anal fin is supported by between 32 and 34 soft rays. The caudal fin has a well defined black margin. This species has 23 to 29 serrations on the lower body, anterior to the pelvic fins.

== Distribution and habitat ==
Myleus planquettei is found in French Guinana and Suriname. It may also occur in Guyana, but this needs to be confirmed. It is restricted to the upper regions of rivers where there is a fast current and clear water providing ideal conditions for aquatic plants of the family Podostemaceae, its main food, to grow.

== Conservation status ==
Myleus planquettei is classified as Vulnerable by the International Union for Conservation of Nature because of its restricted range and the continuing threats to its population and habitat from overfishing and gold mining.
