= Red-bellied pacu =

Red-bellied pacu can refer to the following species of fish of the subfamily Serrasalminae:

- Colossoma macropomum or tambaqui
- Piaractus brachypomus or pirapitinga
