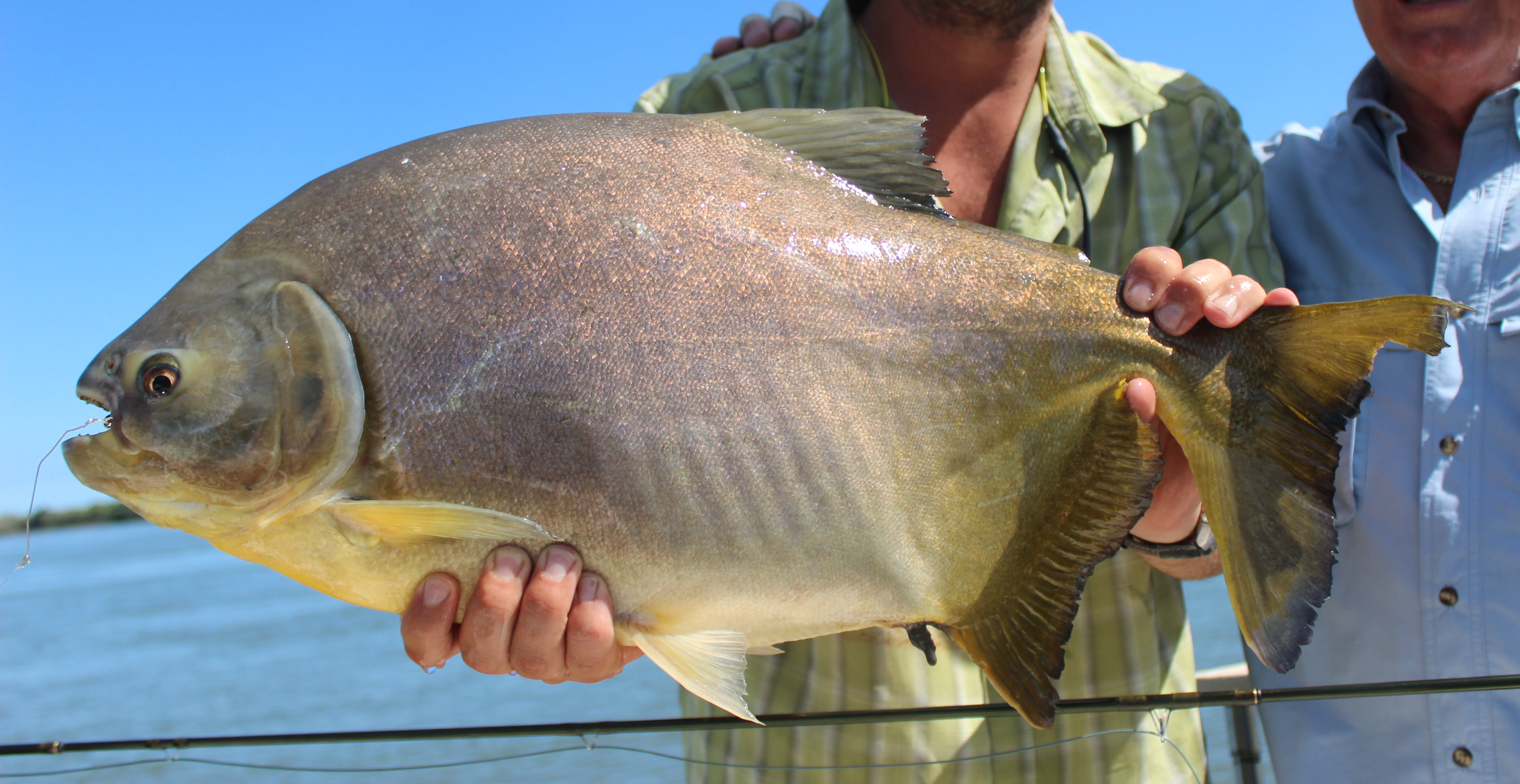
- At Corrientes, Argentina

Conservation status
- Near Threatened (IUCN 3.1)

Scientific classification
- Kingdom: Animalia
- Phylum: Chordata
- Class: Actinopterygii
- Order: Characiformes
- Family: Serrasalmidae
- Genus: Piaractus
- Species: P. mesopotamicus

Binomial name
- Piaractus mesopotamicus (Holmberg, 1887)

Synonyms
- Myletes (Myleus) mesopotamicus Holmberg, 1887; Myletes mitrei C. Berg, 1895; Colosoma canterai Devincenzi, 1942

= Piaractus mesopotamicus =

Species of fish

Piaractus mesopotamicus, pirapitinga, the small-scaled pacu, Paraná River pacu or simply pacu (a name shared with other species), is a species of freshwater ray-finned fish belonging to the family Serrasalmidae, which includes the piranhas, pacus and related fishes. These fishes are endemic to the drainage basin of the Paraguay River in South America.

== Taxonomy ==
Piaractus mesopotamicus was first formally described as Myletes (Myleus) mesopotamicus in 1887 by the Argentine naturalist and novelist Eduardo Ladislao Holmberg with its type locality given as the Río Uruguay and Río Baradero, tributaries of the Rio Paraná in Uruguay. This species is classified in the genus Piaractus which belongs to the subfamily Colossomatinae within the family Serrasalmidae, which is classified in the suborder Characoidei of the order Characiformes.

The validity of P. mesopotamicus has at times been questioned, as it has been found to clade within P. brachypomus.

== Etymology ==
Piaractus mesopotamicus is a member of the genus Piaractus, this name combies the Greek pī́ar, meaning "fat", with aktís, which means "ray", an allusion to the adipose fin having fin rays. The specific name mesopotamicus means "between rivers", this probably alludes to Argernina's to Región Mesopotámica (or La Mesopotamia), a northeastern region situated between the rivers Paraná and Uruguay, where this fish is found.

== Distribution ==
Piaractus mesopotamicus is endemic to the Paraguay-Paraná River basin, but it has been introduced by aquaculture activities in a wider area.

== Description ==
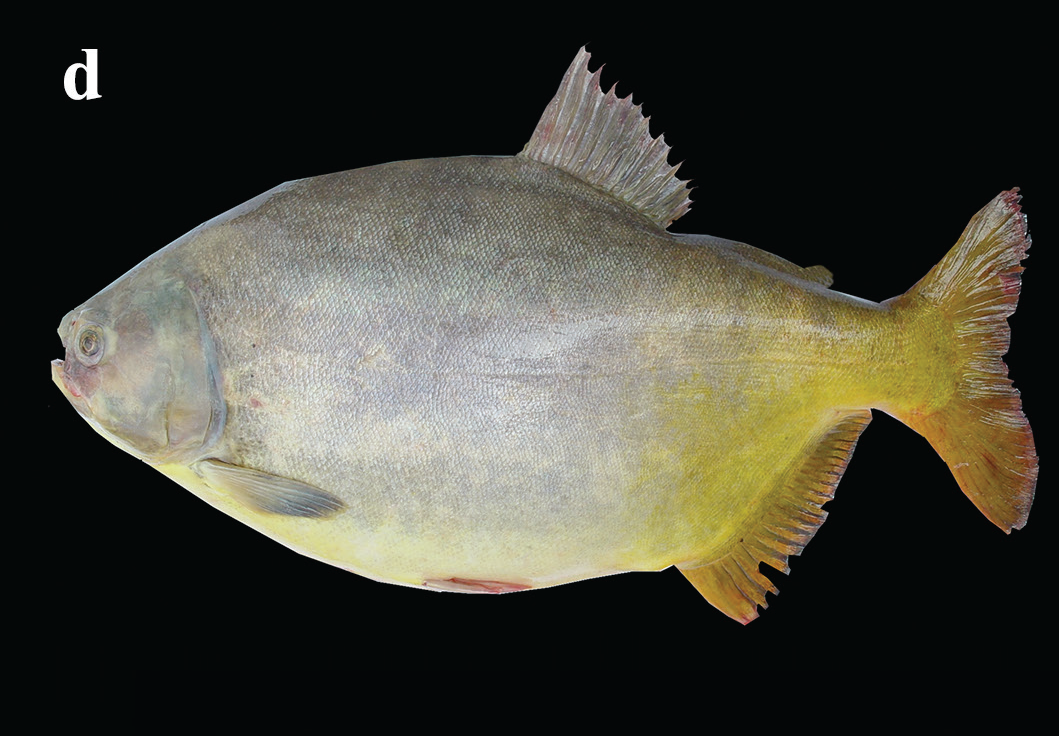
50 cm SL specimen

Piaractus mesopotamicus is a robust fish, with ovoid shape, flattened laterally. Its colour is dark grey to silver, with a white belly and a yellow breast. It reaches up to 62 cm (2.03 ft) in length and 20 kg (44 lb) in weight. The other member of its genus, P. brachypomus, can be distinguished by its larger scale-size and the lower number of lateral scales (less than 110).

== Biology ==
Piaractus mesopotamicus is an omnivore. Young individuals usually feed on micro-crustaceans, while adults feed on plant material and insects. Main food items for adults are nuts and seeds that fall from trees in flooded forests.

It tolerates water temperatures between 15 and 35 °C (59–95 °F), but stops feeding when it falls below 18 °C (64 °F).

== Gallery ==
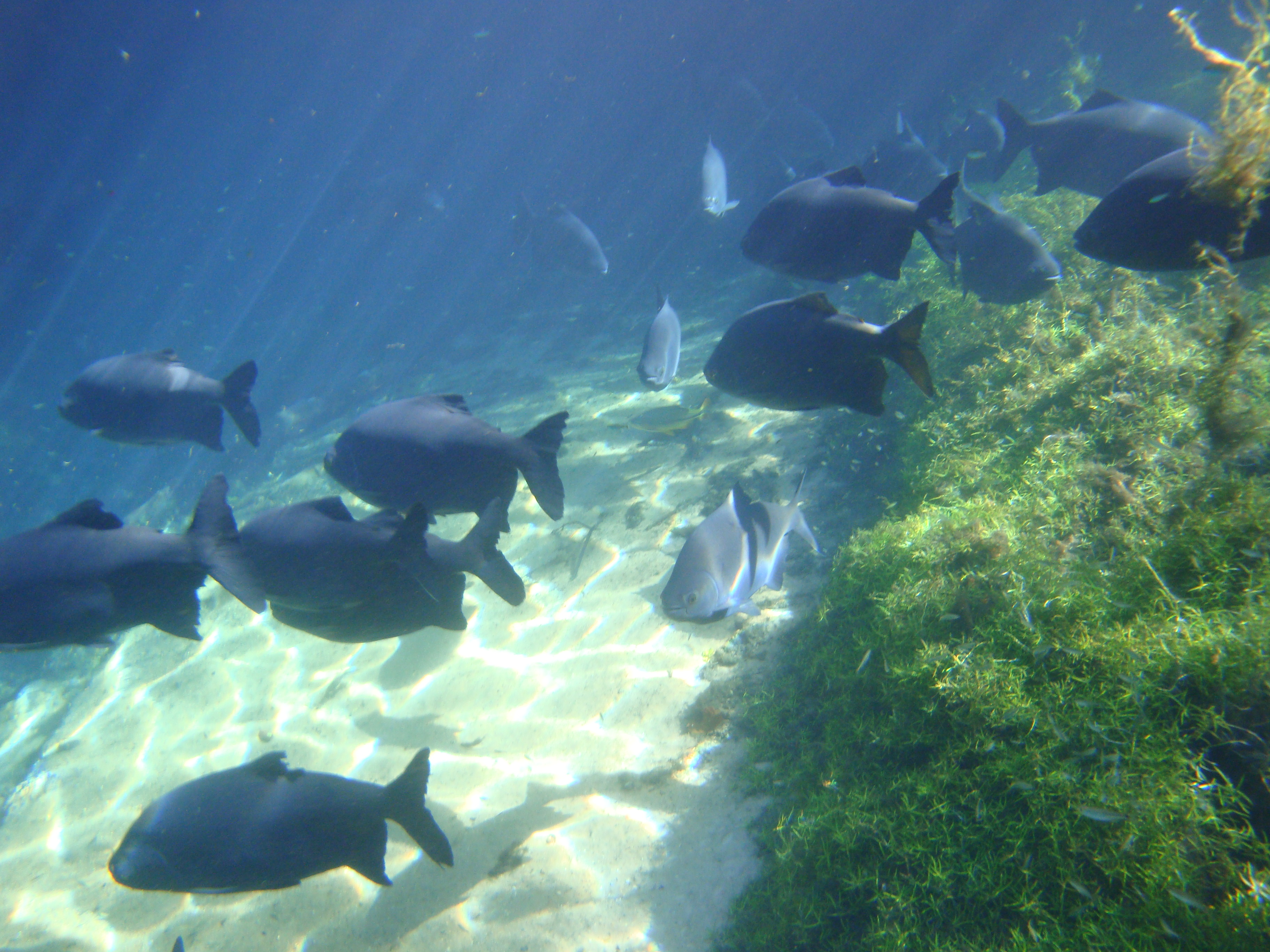
In Río de la Plata

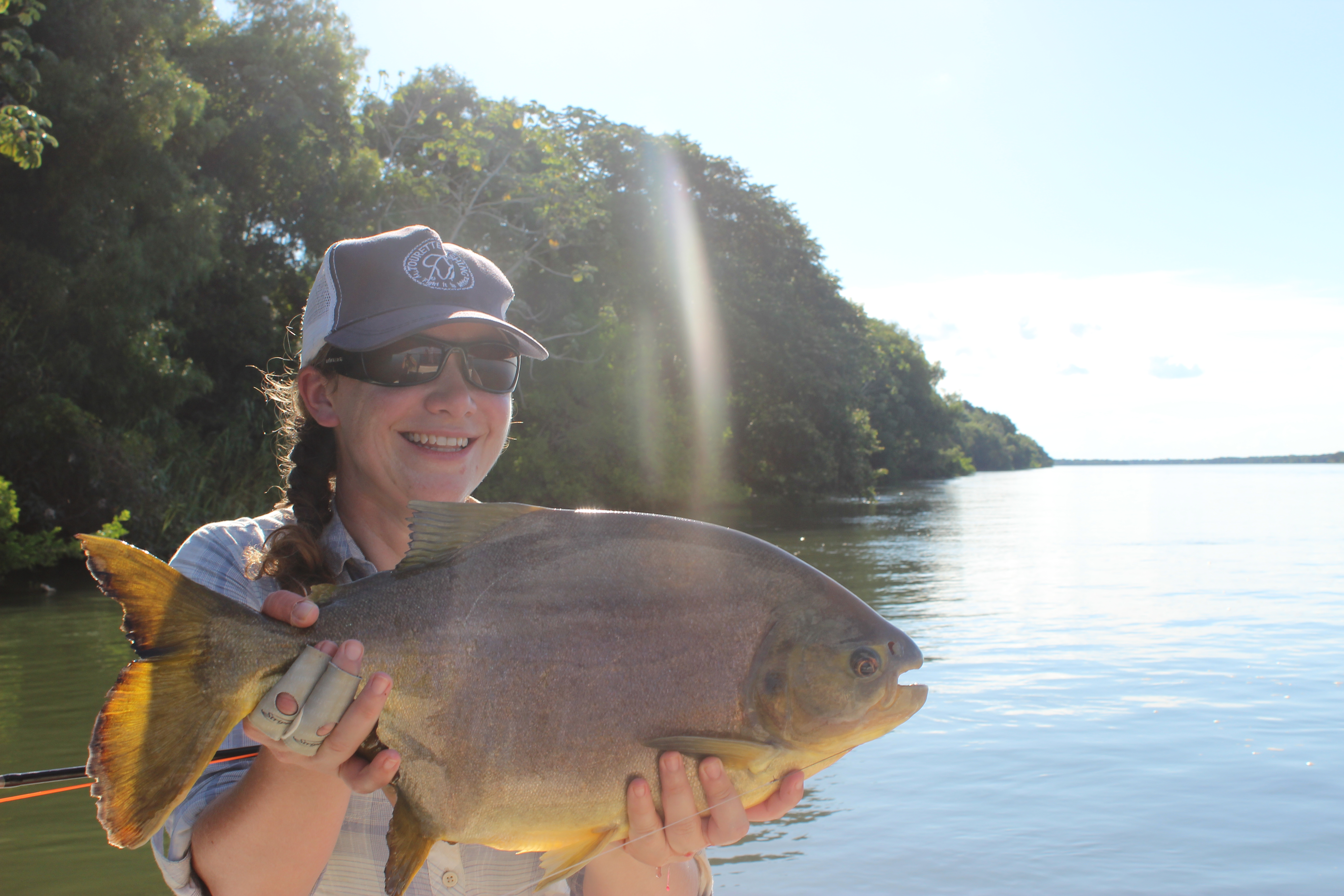
Corrientes, Argentina

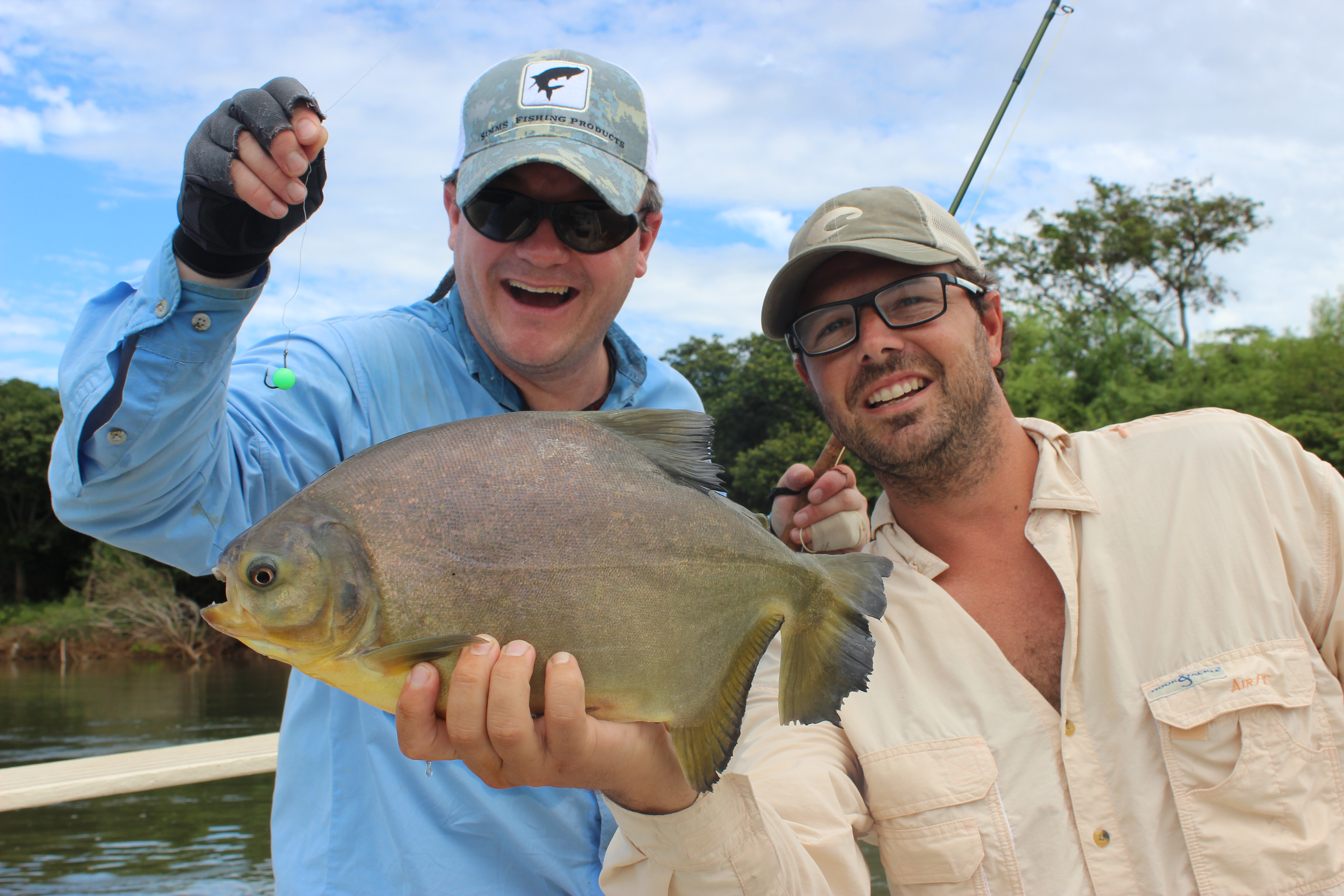
Corrientes, Argentina

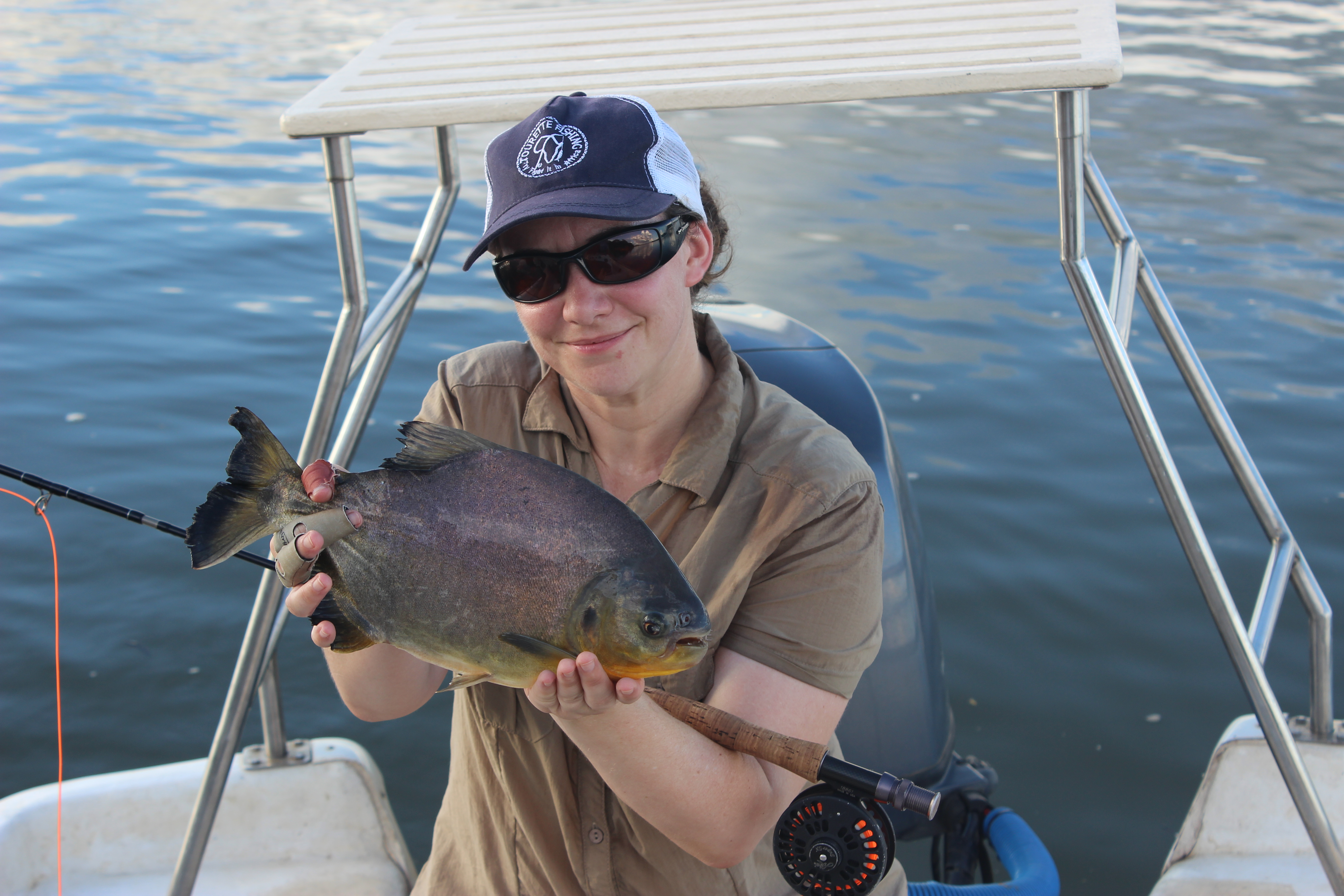
Corrientes, Argentina
