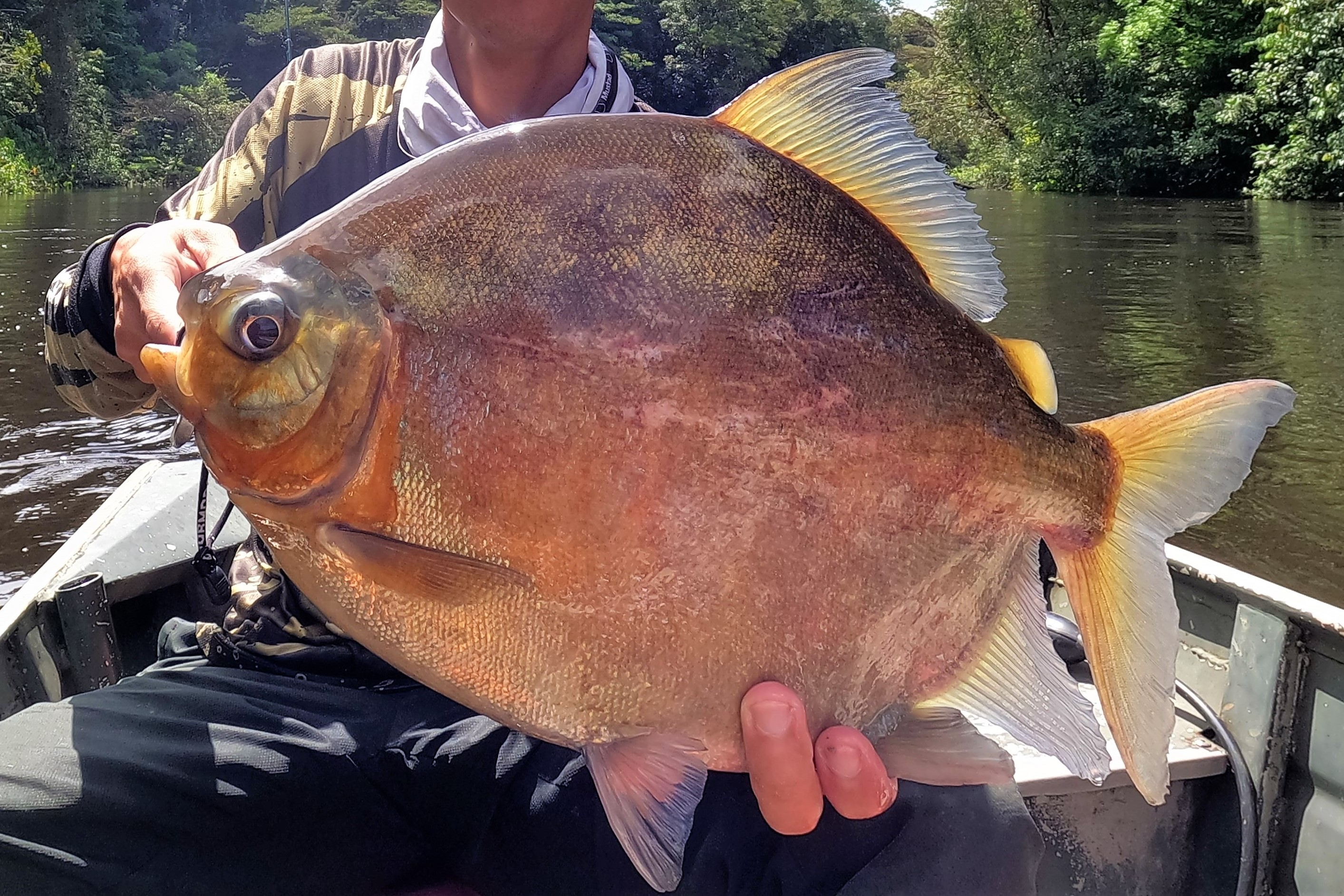

Conservation status
- Least Concern (IUCN 3.1)

Scientific classification
- Kingdom: Animalia
- Phylum: Chordata
- Class: Actinopterygii
- Order: Characiformes
- Family: Serrasalmidae
- Subfamily: Myleinae
- Genus: Prosomyleus; Géry, 1972
- Species: P. rhomboidalis

Binomial name
- Prosomyleus rhomboidalis (G. Cuvier, 1818)

Synonyms
- Myletes rhomboidalis Cuvier, 1818; Myleus rhomboidalis (Cuvier 1818); Myloplus rhomboidalis (Cuvier 1818); Tetragonopterus latus Jardine, 1841

= Prosomyleus =

Species of fish

Prosomyleus is a monospecific genus of freshwater ray-finned fish belonging to the family Serrasalmidae, the pacus, piranhas and related species. The only species in this genus is Prosomyleus rhomboidalis, which is a medium to large omnivorous fish from South America, where it is found in the Amazon River basin, as well as the north and the eastern Guiana Shield rivers. It can grow to a length of 40.7 cm (16.0 in).

It was formerly placed in the genus Myleus, of which it was thought to be the only member of its own subgenus, Prosomyleus. It was upgraded to being a distinct genus in 2021.
