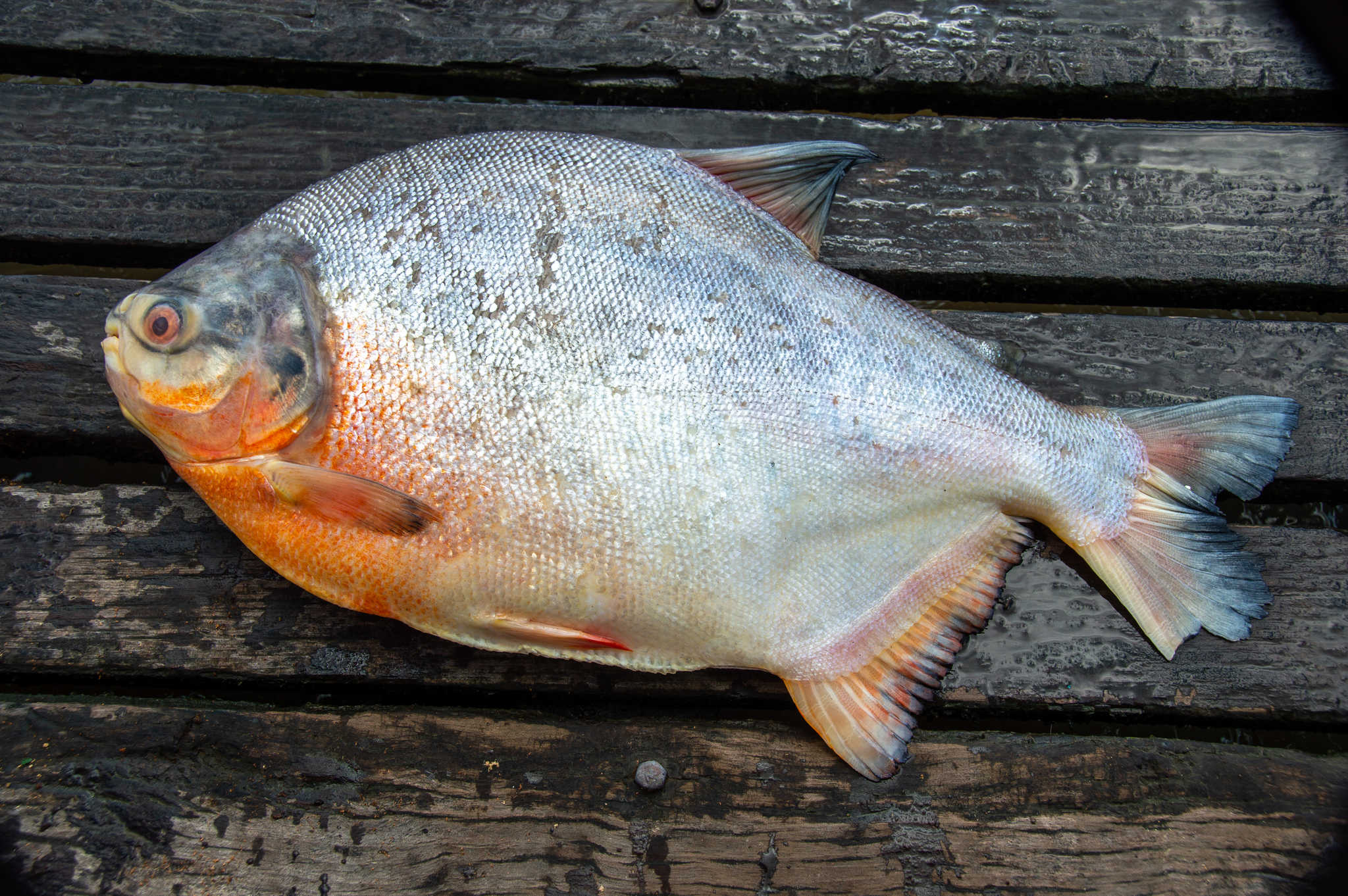
- In Carauari, Brazil

Conservation status
- Least Concern (IUCN 3.1)

Scientific classification
- Kingdom: Animalia
- Phylum: Chordata
- Class: Actinopterygii
- Order: Characiformes
- Family: Serrasalmidae
- Genus: Piaractus
- Species: P. brachypomus

Binomial name
- Piaractus brachypomus (G. Cuvier, 1818)

Synonyms
- Colossoma bidens Colossoma brachypomum

= Piaractus brachypomus =

Species of fish

Piaractus brachypomus also known as the red-bellied Pacu or pirapitinga, is a large species of pacu, a close relative of piranhas and silver dollars, in the serrasalmid family. As with a number of other closely related species, P. brachypomus is often referred to as the red-bellied pacu in reference to the appearance of the juveniles. This has resulted in a great deal of confusion about the nature and needs of all the species involved, with the reputation and requirements of one frequently being wrongly attributed to the others.

== Genomics ==
A chromosome-level genome assembly of Piaractus brachypomus was published in 2026, representing the first reference genome for the species. The genome is approximately 1.34 Gb and comprises 27 chromosomes. The assembly has a BUSCO completeness of 99.8% and contains 25,501 predicted protein-coding genes.

== Distribution ==
It is native to the Amazon basin in tropical South America, but it formerly included populations in the Orinoco, which was described in 2019 as a separate species, P. orinoquensis.

P. brachypomus is widely farmed and has been introduced to regions outside of its native range. In South Florida they are invasive in rivers, canals or lakes.

== Ecology ==
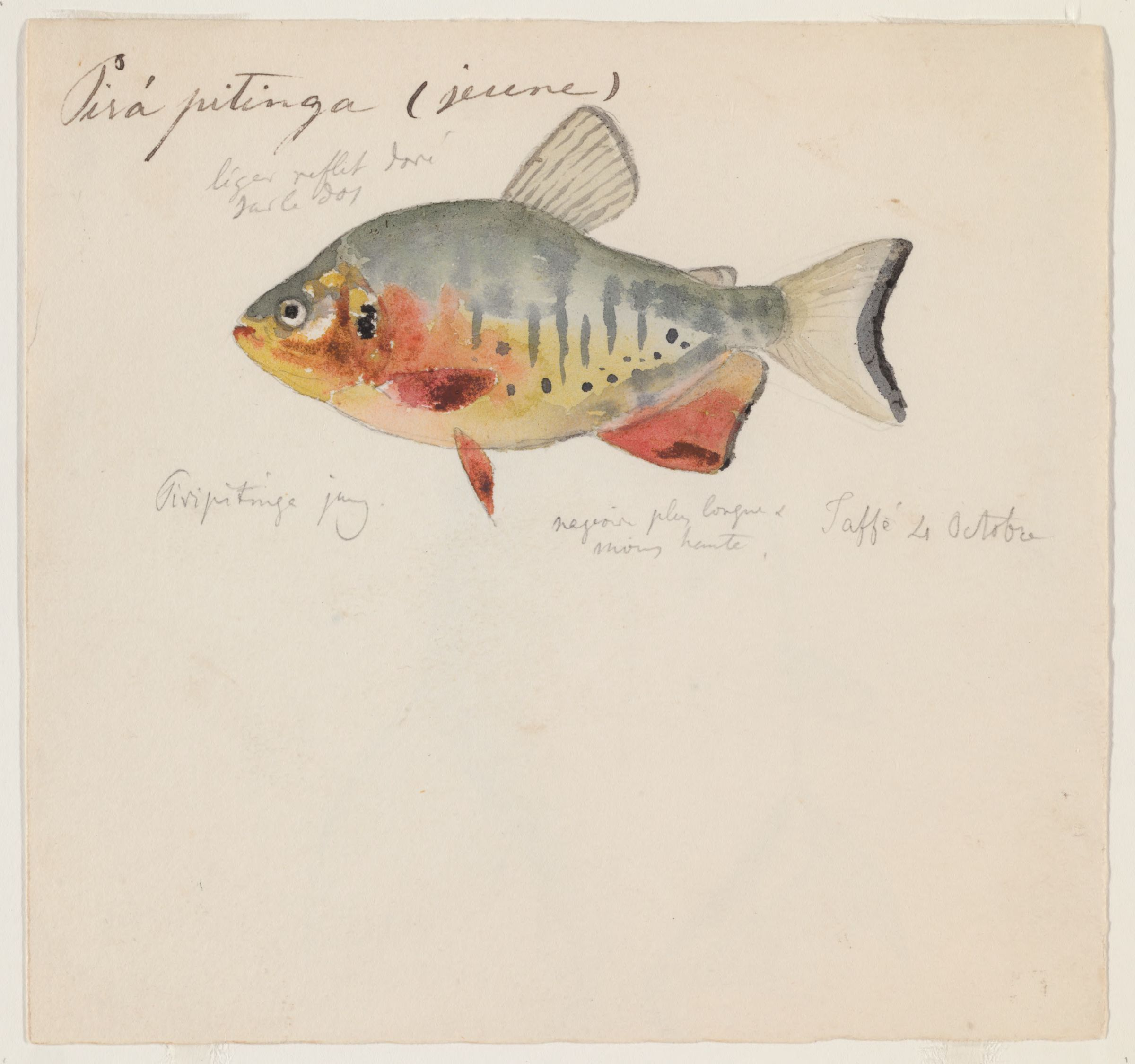
An 1865 watercolor painting of Piaractus brachypomus from Tefé, Brazil by Jacques Burkhardt.

In general, its behavior resembles that of the closely related tambaqui (Colossoma macropomum). It is migratory, but the pattern is poorly understood. Spawning occurs at the beginning of the flood season between November and February. Larvae of the Red-Bellied Pacu are found in whitewater rivers, but adults mainly live in flooded forests and floodplains of various river types, including those of both nutrient-rich and nutrient-poor. Unlike the tambaqui, the Red-bellied pacu also occurs in the headwaters of nutrient-poor rivers (not just in the lower sections).

It mainly feeds on fruits, seeds, and nuts, but it is opportunistic and will also take zooplankton, insects, crustaceans and small fish, especially in the dry season. In general, more seeds are able to pass undamaged through the red-bellied pacu than the tambaqui, meaning that the former is overall a more efficient seed disperser.

== Description ==
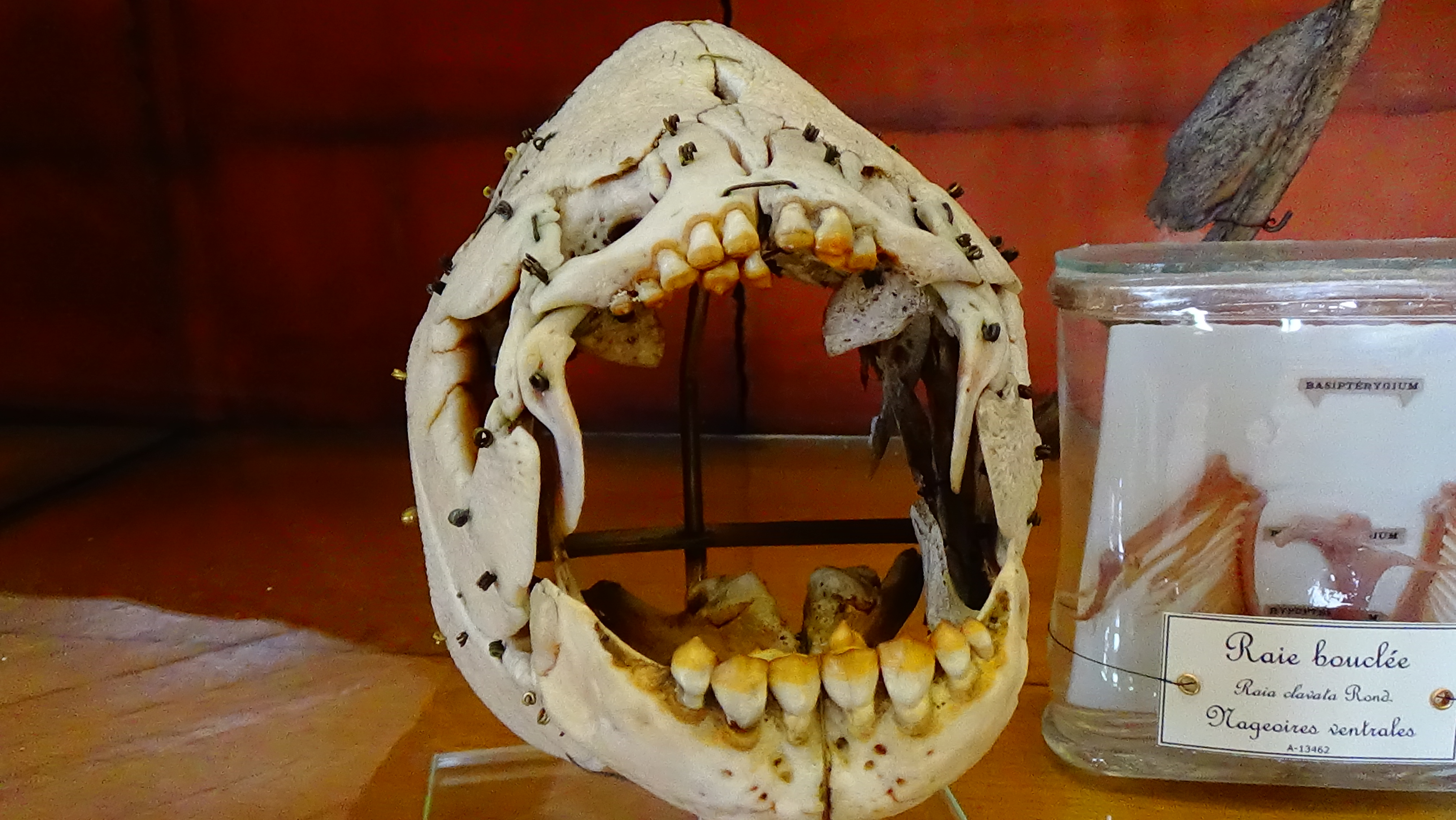
Jaws

Piaractus brachypomus can reach up to 88 cm (2.9 ft) in length and 25 kg (55 lb) in weight.

Juveniles have a distinct red chest and stomach, and are easily confused with the carnivorous red-bellied piranha (Pygocentrus nattereri), but the two can be separated by their teeth, which are molar-like in Piaractus brachypomus. This similarity is believed to be Batesian mimicry by P. brachypomus in an attempt of avoiding predation by other species. Adults lack the bright red chest and belly, and resemble the tambaqui (Colossoma macropomum), but can be separated by several meristic and morphological features: The Red-Bellied Pacu has a smaller adipose fin that lacks rays, as well as differences in teeth and operculum. The Red-bellied Pacu also has a more rounded head profile (less elongated and pointed). The other member of its genus, P. mesopotamicus, can be distinguished by its smaller scale-size and the higher number of lateral scales (more than 110).

== Connection to humans ==
The Red-Bellied Pacu supports major fisheries and based on a review by IBAMA, it was the 12th most caught fish by weight in the Brazilian Amazon in 1998 (just after the tambaqui).

The Red-Bellied Pacu is often kept in aquaculture. Hybrids between this species and the tambaqui have been produced in aquaculture. It can also hybridize with P. orinoquensis, but the offspring appears to be sterile.
