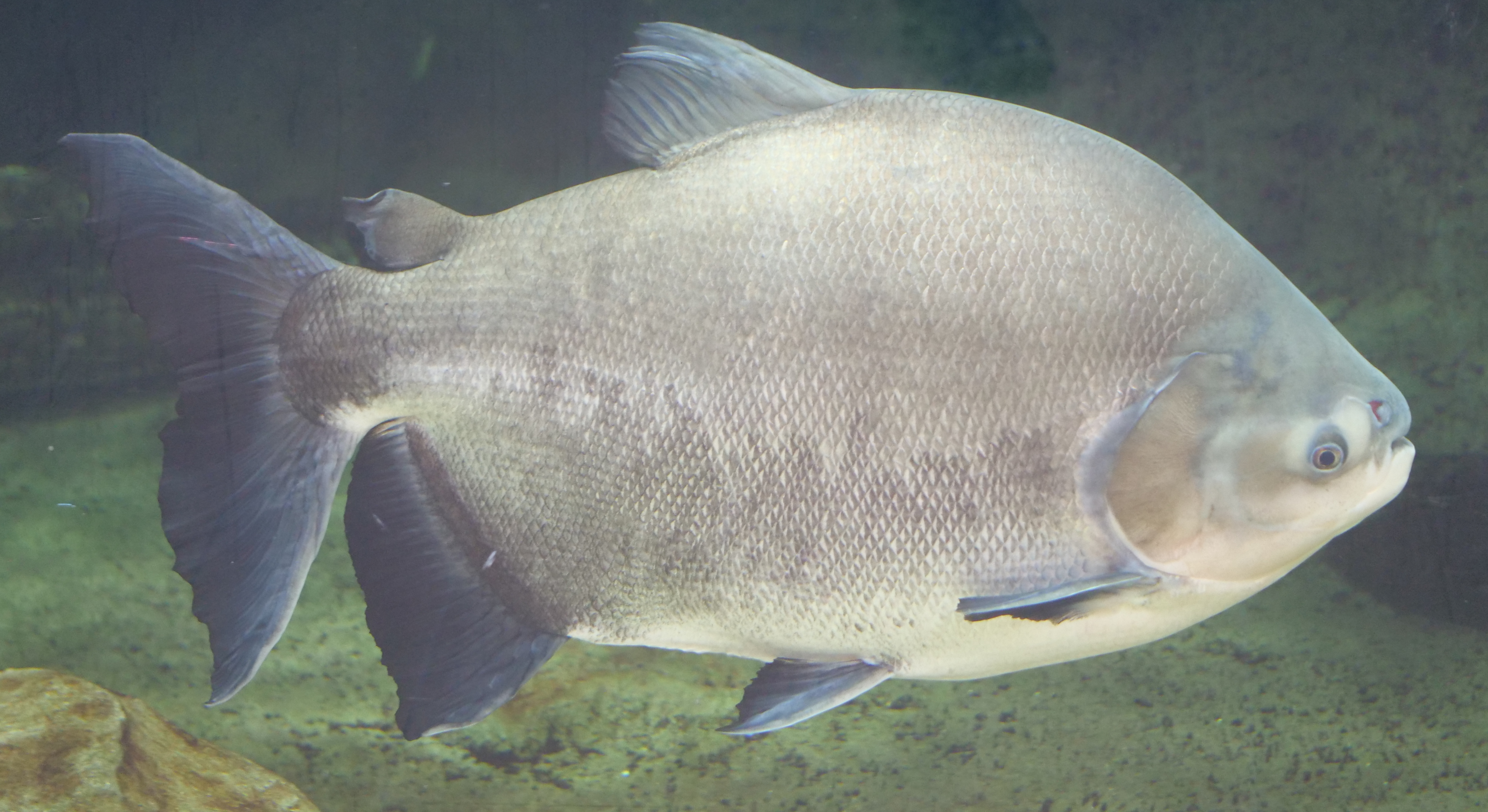
- Piaractus sp.

Scientific classification
- Kingdom: Animalia
- Phylum: Chordata
- Class: Actinopterygii
- Order: Characiformes
- Family: Serrasalmidae
- Subfamily: Colossomatinae
- Genus: Piaractus; C. H. Eigenmann, 1903

Type species
- Myletes brachypomus G. Cuvier, 1817

= Piaractus =

Genus of fishes

Piaractus is a genus of large serrasalmid from South America, and one of several genera colloquially referred to as "pacu". Species in this genus are commonly called pirapatinga.

The two traditionally recognized species of Piaractus are very similar in appearance and were formerly included in the genus Colossoma, which currently only contains another similar species, the tambaqui (Colossoma macropomum). A third Piaractus was described in 2019 as a new species, which was formerly considered a subpopulation of P. brachypomus.

== Species ==
There are currently three recognized species in this genus:

Species	Common name	Distribution
Piaractus brachypomus (G. Cuvier, 1818)	red-bellied pacu	Amazon basin
Piaractus mesopotamicus (Holmberg, 1887)	small-scaled pacu, Paraná River pacu	Paraguay-Paraná basin
Piaractus orinoquensis Escobar et al., 2019	Venezuelan pacu	Orinoco basin
