= Serrasalmus scapularis =

Conservation status
- Least Concern (IUCN 3.1)

Scientific classification
- Kingdom: Animalia
- Phylum: Chordata
- Class: Actinopterygii
- Division: Teleostei
- Order: Characiformes
- Family: Serrasalmidae
- Genus: Serrasalmus
- Species: S. scapularis

Binomial name
- Serrasalmus scapularis Günther, 1864

Synonyms
- Serrasalmo scapularis Günther, 1864; Serrasalmo (Pygocentrus) striolatus Steindachner, 1908; Pristobrycon striolatus (Steindachner, 1908); Serrasalmus striolatus Steindachner, 1908; Pristobrycon baratai Amaral Campos, 1946; Pygopristis antoni Fernández-Yépez, 1965

Species of fish

Serrasalmus scapularis is a species of freshwater ray-finned fish belonging to the family Serrasalmidae, which includes the pacus, piranhas and related fishes. This species is found in the Amazon and Orinoco river systems and in the coastal rivers of the Guiana Shield.

== Range and habitat ==
Serrasalmus scapularis inhabits mainly black or acidic waters in tributaries in the Orinoco and Amazon River Basins.

== Description ==
This small and beautiful fish reaches 10–30 centimetres (3.9–11.8 in). Its body is discoid with the anterodorsal profile slightly curved or straight. The head is robust and wide. Its snout is blunt. A preanal spine is absent. The adipose fin is wide. The head is silver with metallic orange to red at the mandibular and opercular regions. Its iris is yellow. Its body is greenish laterally and a mixture of orange and red at the abdominal area, covered with "pepper-like" spots. It has a single spot in the opercular area above the pectoral fin origin. The fins have reddish tones. Its caudal fin has an angled basal black band.

== Feeding ==
Like other piranhas, Serrasalmus scapularis is a predator, consuming smaller fish and attacking fins. Juveniles eat aquatic insects and crustaceans (shrimps). Occasionally, its diet includes fruits from the surrounding gallery forest. This is a solitary, non-schooling species.
