= Utiaritichthys =

Scientific classification
- Kingdom: Animalia
- Phylum: Chordata
- Class: Actinopterygii
- Order: Characiformes
- Family: Serrasalmidae
- Subfamily: Myleinae
- Genus: Utiaritichthys; A. Miranda-Ribeiro, 1937

Type species
- Utiaritichthys sennaebragai A. Miranda-Ribeiro, 1937

Genus of fishes

Utiaritichthys is a genus of serrasalmid fish found in the Amazon and Orinoco basins in tropical South America. The adults are typically found in rapidly flowing water where they feed on aquatic plants in the family Podostemaceae and filamentous algae. They reach up to 32.2 cm (1.06 ft) in standard length.

The monophyly and taxonomic position of the genus is not fully resolved. The only clear difference from Myloplus is the comparatively longer body of Utiaritichthys.

== Species ==
There are currently three recognized species in this genus:

- Utiaritichthys esguiceroi Pereira & R. M. C. Castro, 2014
- Utiaritichthys longidorsalis Jégu, Tito de Morais & dos Santos, 1992
- Utiaritichthys sennaebragai A. Miranda-Ribeiro, 1937
