= Ossubtus =

Conservation status
- Vulnerable (IUCN 3.1)

Scientific classification
- Kingdom: Animalia
- Phylum: Chordata
- Class: Actinopterygii
- Order: Characiformes
- Family: Serrasalmidae
- Subfamily: Myleinae
- Genus: Ossubtus; Jégu, 1992
- Species: O. xinguense

Binomial name
- Ossubtus xinguense Jégu, 1992

Species of fish

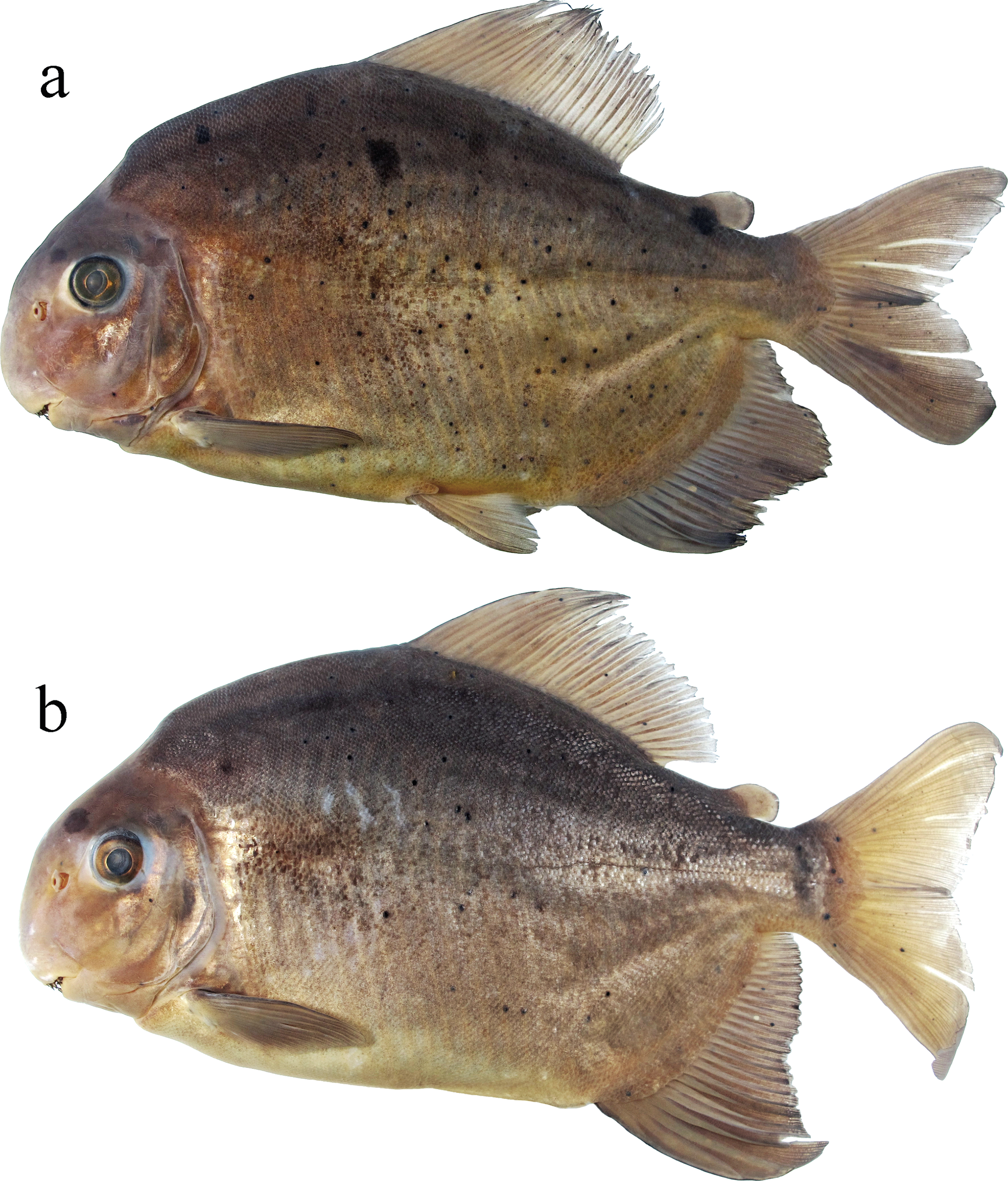
Adults of Ossubtus xinguense: GEA 1973, (a) male, 202.7 mm SL; (b) female, 168.5 mm SL. Brazil, Rio Xingu, Volta Grande.

Ossubtus is a genus of fish in the family Serrasalmidae. It contains a single species, Ossubtus xinguense, the parrot pacu or eaglebeak pacu, The species is endemic to rapids in the Xingu River basin in the Brazilian Amazon. This vulnerable species is primarily a herbivore.

== Description ==
The body of Ossubtus xinguense is ovoid in shape. The profile of the snout is blunt. In young fish, the mouth is terminal (pointing forward); however, as the fish grows, the mouth turns downward and becomes strictly ventral in individuals longer than 5 cm (2 in). This gives the mouth a beak-like appearance. It reaches up to 25 cm (10 in) in total length and about 380 g (13 oz) in weight.

== Range and habitat ==
Ossubtus xinguense is restricted to rapids in the Xingu River basin in the Brazilian Amazon. It has been confirmed from Volta Grande do Xingu in the lower Xingu River and lower Iriri River near its confluence with Xingu, but possibly also occurs further upstream on these rivers (perhaps as far as São Félix do Xingu).

This species is strictly rheophilic and found in rapids, but prefers sheltered, Podostemaceae-covered rocky crevices. Young individuals of up to 4 cm (1.6 in) can be observed in schools of 20–30 individuals, sheltered under broad stones.

== Behavior ==
The species is primarily a herbivore and a diet analysis of 10 specimens revealed mostly plant material, but also lower quantities of macroinvertebrates.

Shrimp, dead or alive, blood worm, vegetable matter, brine shrimp and daphnia are consumed in captivity. The female is far more dominant than the male and will often seek caves into which no other fish may enter. This is believed to be due to reproductive dominance, once a suitable breeding location is found, the female will not surrender it.

== Parasites ==
It is parasitized by Anphiira xinguensis, an isopode of the family Cymothoidae. This parasite is only known from Ossubtus xinguense where it lives in the gill chamber of the fish and develops a contorted morphology, presumably in response to its host's cursive ontogeny. The intestines are also commonly infested with Rondonia rondoni, a nematode that possibly is symbiotic rather than parasitic. Black spot disease is found in most Ossubtus xinguense.

== Status ==
This fish is "vulnerable". A review in 2016 suggested that it is more widespread than previously believed and its historic rarity as museum specimens in part can be explained by its habitat (rapids), which are difficult to sample, but it remains threatened by dams such as the Belo Monte.
