= Mylesinus =

Scientific classification
- Domain: Eukaryota
- Kingdom: Animalia
- Phylum: Chordata
- Class: Actinopterygii
- Order: Characiformes
- Family: Serrasalmidae
- Subfamily: Myleinae
- Genus: Mylesinus; Valenciennes, 1850

Type species
- Mylesinus schomburgkii Valenciennes, 1850

Genus of fishes

Mylesinus is a genus of serrasalmids from South America, where found in the eastern Amazon, Essequibo and Orinoco basins. They are rheophilic, typically found at rapids and mainly feed on Podostemaceae plants. Because of their habitat preference, they are threatened by the building of dams. They reach up to 35 cm (1.15 ft) in standard length, and the adult males have a double-lobed anal fin and several filamentous extensions on the dorsal fin.

== Species ==
There are three recognized species:

- Mylesinus paraschomburgkii Jégu, dos Santos & E. J. G. Ferreira, 1989
- Mylesinus paucisquamatus Jégu & dos Santos, 1988
- Mylesinus schomburgkii Valenciennes, 1850
