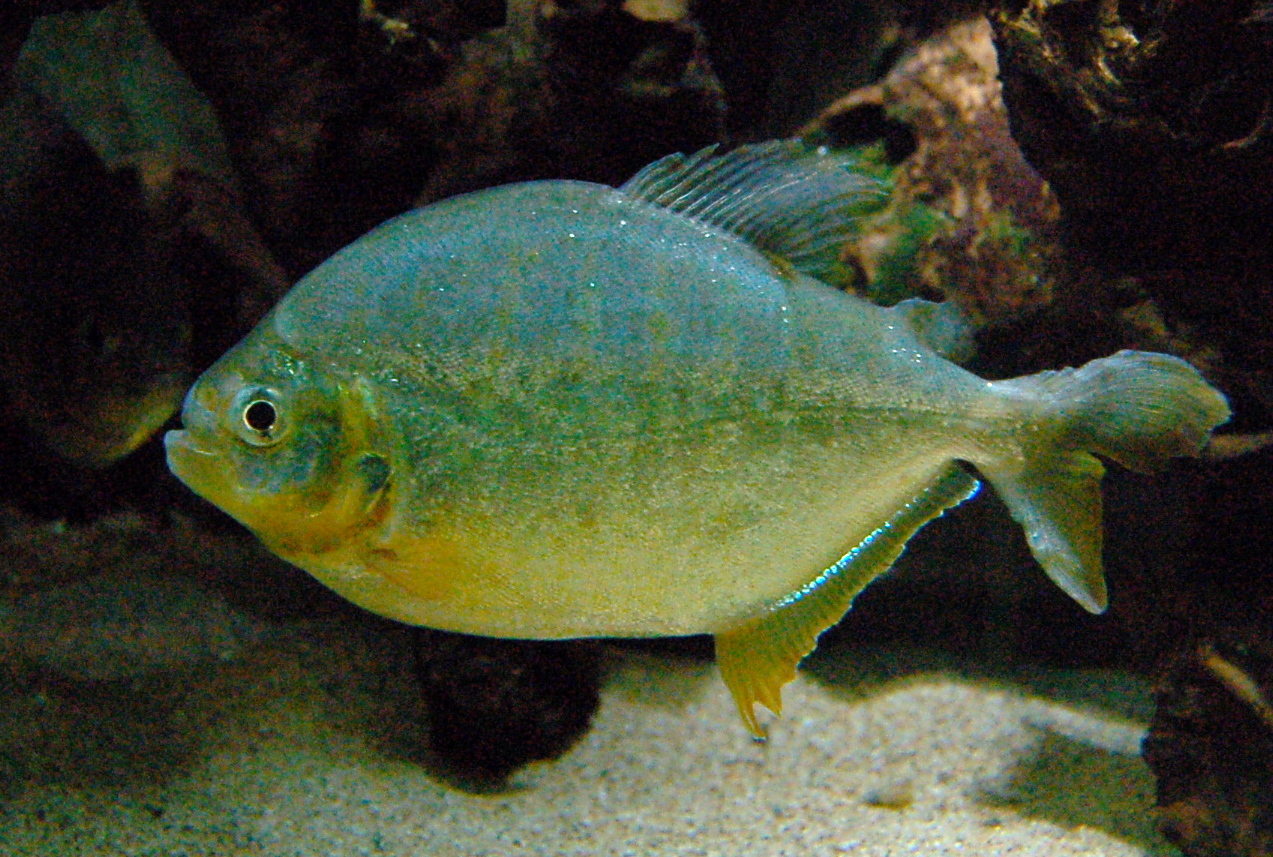

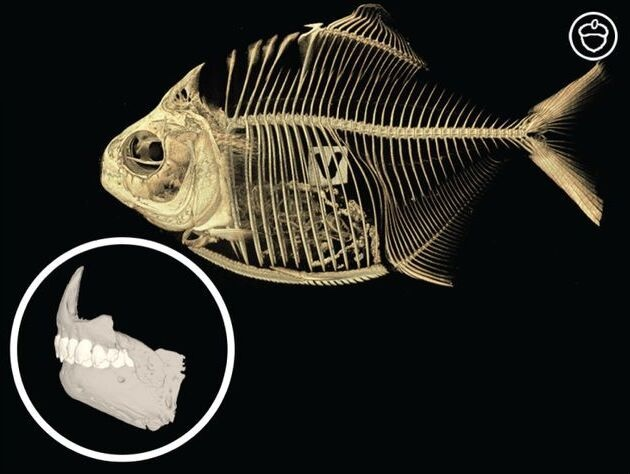

Conservation status
- Least Concern (IUCN 3.1)

Scientific classification
- Kingdom: Animalia
- Phylum: Chordata
- Class: Actinopterygii
- Division: Teleostei
- Order: Characiformes
- Family: Serrasalmidae
- Subfamily: Serrasalminae
- Genus: Pygopristis; J. P. Müller & Troschel, 1844
- Species: P. denticulata

Binomial name
- Pygopristis denticulata (Cuvier, 1819)

Synonyms
- Serrasalmus denticulatus Cuvier, 1819; Serrasalmus punctatus Jardine, 1841; Pygopristis fumarius J. Müller & Troschel, 1844; Pygopristis serrulatus Valenciennes, 1850; Serrasalmus serrulatus (Valenciennes, 1850)

= Pygopristis =

Species of fish

Pygopristis is a monospecific genus of freshwater ray-finned fishes belonging to the family Serrasalmidae, which includes the pacus, piranhas and related fishes. The only species in the genus is Pygopristis denticulata, also known as the lobetoothed piranha. This species is a rare South American characiform fish found in the Orinoco River basin, rivers of the northern and eastern Guiana Shield, and tributaries of the lower Amazon River. Like other piranhas, it is found in freshwater, with specimens of this species typically found in acidic clearwater or blackwater environments. Despite their ferocious reputation, many piranhas have broader diets; this species feeds on the scales of other fish as juveniles, but transitions to a broader diet of aquatic insects, small fish, and fruits as adults.

== Biology ==
P. denticulata grows to about 20 cm (7.9 in) in total length. It has 62 chromosomes.P. denticulata has pentacuspid teeth and a middle cusp that is usually only slightly larger than the other cusps. This is unlike other piranhas, which have tricuspid teeth with a larger middle cusp, making the teeth appear triangular.

== Taxonomy ==
Within the family Serrasalmidae, P. denticulata is more closely related to Catoprion than it is to the majority of species traditionally considered true piranhas.

== Gallery ==
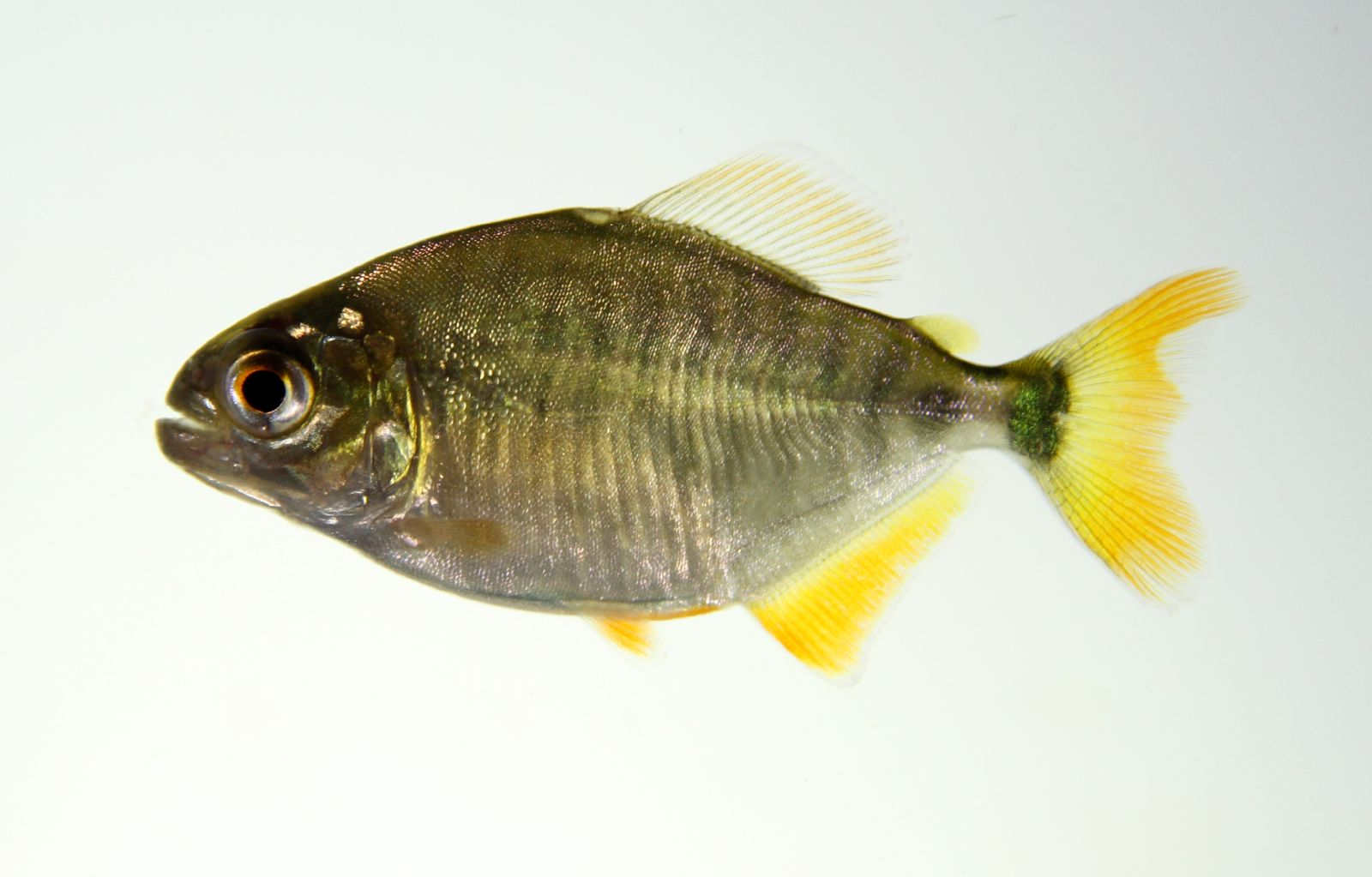
Juvenile

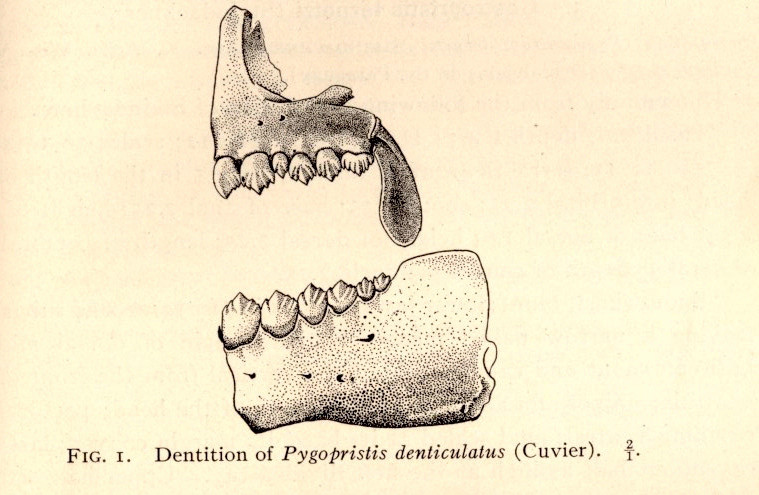
Dentition
