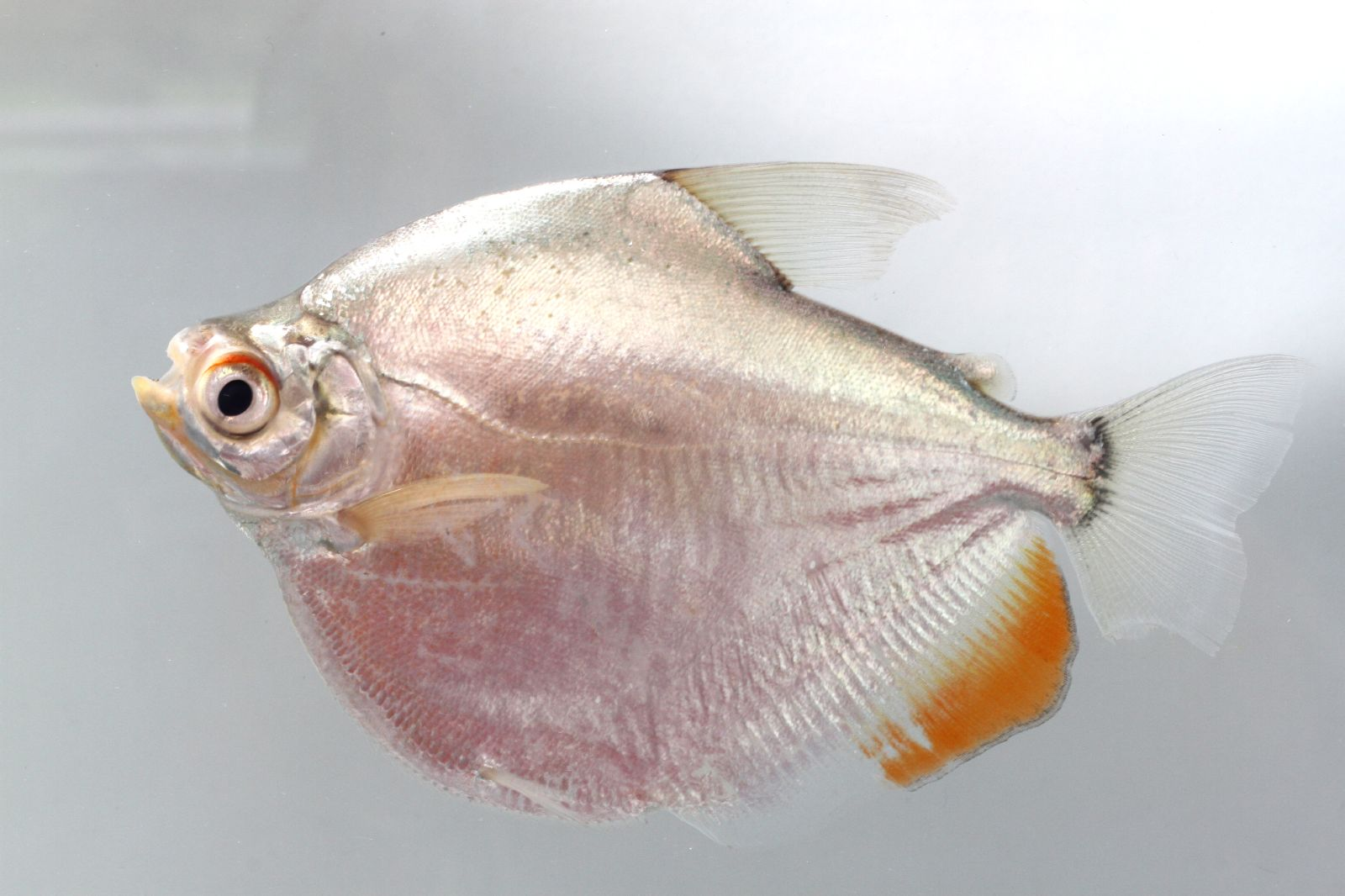
- Mylossoma aureum

Scientific classification
- Kingdom: Animalia
- Phylum: Chordata
- Class: Actinopterygii
- Order: Characiformes
- Family: Serrasalmidae
- Subfamily: Colossomatinae
- Genus: Mylossoma; C. H. Eigenmann & C. H. Kennedy, 1903

Type species
- Myletes albiscopus Cope, 1872

= Mylossoma =

Mylossoma Temporal range: Middle Miocene to present

Genus of fishes

Mylossoma is a genus of serrasalmids from tropical and subtropical South America, including the basins of the Amazon, Orinoco, Lake Maracaibo and Paraguay-Paraná. These common fish are found both in main river sections and floodplains. They support important fisheries and based on a review by IBAMA, they are the seventh most caught fish by weight in the Brazilian Amazon. They primarily feed on plant material such as seeds and fruits (to a lesser extent invertebrates), and in their ecology they generally resemble the larger tambaqui (Colossoma macropomum). Mylossoma reach up to 28.5 cm (11.2 in) in length and 1 kg (2.2 lb) in weight.

Fossil remains are known from the Middle Miocene-aged Pebas Formation of Peru.

== Species ==
There are currently 5 recognized species in this genus:

- Mylossoma acanthogaster (Valenciennes, 1850)
- Mylossoma albiscopum (Cope, 1872)
- Mylossoma aureum (Spix & Agassiz, 1829)
- Mylossoma duriventre (G. Cuvier, 1818)
- Mylossoma unimaculatum (Steindachner, 1908)
