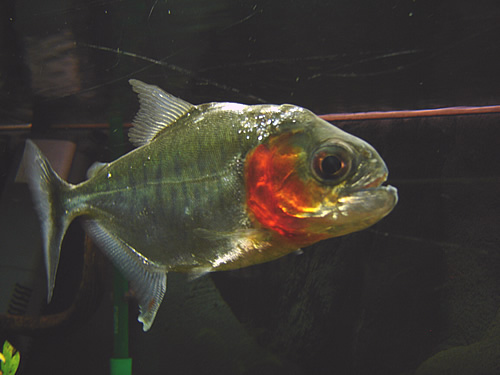
- Serrasalmus manueli

Scientific classification
- Kingdom: Animalia
- Phylum: Chordata
- Class: Actinopterygii
- Division: Teleostei
- Order: Characiformes
- Suborder: Characoidei
- Family: Serrasalmidae; Bleeker, 1859

Type genus
- Serrasalmus Lacépède, 1803

Genera
- See text

= Serrasalmidae =

Serrasalmidae Temporal range: Late Eocene to present Possible Maastrichtian occurrence

Family of fishes

The Serrasalmidae (serrasalmids) are a family of characiform fishes native to freshwater habitats of South America. They include more than 90 species. The name means "serrated salmon family", which refers to the serrated keel running along the belly of these fish. Fish classified as Serrasalmidae are also known by these common names: pacu, piranha, and silver dollar. These common names generally designate differing dental characteristics and feeding habits.

== Description ==
Serrasalmids are medium- to large-sized characiform bony fishes that reach about 1 m (3.3 ft) long, generally characterized by a deep, laterally compressed body with a series of midventral abdominal spines or scutes, and a long dorsal fin (over 16 rays). Most species also possess an anteriorly directed spine just before the dorsal fin extending from a supraneural bone; exceptions include members of the genera Colossoma, Piaractus, and Mylossoma.

Most serrasalmids have about 60 chromosomes, ranging from 54 to 62. Metynnis has 62 chromosomes, as does Catoprion, Pristobrycon striolatus, and Pygopristis.

== Evolution ==
=== Taxonomy ===
The Serrasalmidae were until, recently, classified as a subfamily of the Characidae, with their taxonomic relationships uncertain at the time. More recent studies have found them to belong to a wider clade of South American characoids, being most closely related to the Hemiodontidae. The Serrasalmidae are relatively well understood, and agreement is wide on the genera and species included.

The family is classified as follows:

- Family Serrasalmidae Bleeker, 1859
  - Subfamily Colossomatinae Kolmann et al., 2021 (lowland pacus)
    - Genus Colossoma Eigenmann & Kennedy, 1903
    - Genus Mylossoma Eigenmann & Kennedy, 1903
    - Genus Piaractus Eigenmann, 1903
  - Subfamily Myleinae C. H. Eigenmann, 1903 (upland pacus)
    - Genus Acnodon Eigenmann, 1903
    - Genus Mylesinus Valenciennes, 1850
    - Genus Myleus Müller & Troschel, 1844
    - Genus Myloplus Gill, 1896
    - Genus Ossubtus Jégu, 1992
    - Genus Paramyloplus Norman, 1929
    - Genus Prosomyleus Géry, 1972
    - Genus Tometes Valenciennes, 1850
    - Genus Utiaritichthys Miranda-Ribeiro, 1937
  - Subfamily Serrasalminae Bleeker, 1859 (piranhas)
    - Genus Catoprion Müller & Troschel, 1844
    - Genus †Megapiranha Cione et al. 2009 (fossil; Late Miocene)
    - Genus Metynnis Cope, 1878
    - Genus Pygocentrus Müller & Troschel, 1844
    - Genus Pygopristis Müller & Troschel, 1844
    - Genus Serrasalmus Lacépède, 1803 (=Pristobrycon Eigenmann, 1915)

=== Fossil record ===
The fossil record, particularly for piranhas, is relatively sparse. Most known fossils are from the Miocene. The earliest definitive serrasalmid fossil teeth are known from the Late Eocene-aged (~38 mya) sediments of the Santa Luca Formation in Bolivia. Teeth resembling those of pacus have been recovered from the late Maastrichtian-aged El Molino Formation, which could potentially suggest a Late Cretaceous occurrence for the family, but these teeth show significant differences from modern serrasalmids, and their assignment to the family is uncertain. Fossils of a living species of Colossoma from the Miocene have been described, suggesting a very conservative history for a specialized herbivorous fish. All serrasalmine genera had originated by the middle Miocene, with the possible exception of three of the four piranha genera (Pygocentrus, Pristobrycon, and Serrasalmus).

== Distribution ==
Serrasalmids inhabit all major and some minor Atlantic river systems in South America east of the Andes, but have been introduced to other areas. Species range from about 10°N latitude south to about 35°S latitude.

== Ecology ==
The diets of the various serrasalmid fishes include seeds, fruits, leaves, and various invertebrate and vertebrate prey, as well as fish flesh, scales, and fins. To emphasize the diversity of diets, authors commonly highlight the fruit- and leaf-eating pacus and the highly carnivorous piranhas. Most in the family other than piranhas are primarily herbivorous. In contrast, piranhas have been long believed to be strict carnivores. Many species change diets depending on age and resource availability.

The primarily carnivorous piranha group comprises the genera Catoprion, Pristobrycon, Pygocentrus, Pygopristis and Serrasalmus, but based on phylogeny also the mainly herbivorous (although with omnivorous tendencies) Metynnis. The remaining primarily herbivorous species can be divided into two groups based on ecology and, to some extent, phylogeny: Colossoma, Mylossoma and Piaractus are mainly found in relatively slow-moving waters, and feed extensively on fruits, nuts and seeds, playing an important role as seed dispersers. Mylesinus, Myleus, Ossubtus, Tometes and Utiaritichthys are found in fast-flowing sections of rivers, and mainly feed on aquatic plants, especially Podostemaceae. Myloplus mostly feed on plant material and some of its species are phylogenetically related with the previous group, but this genus includes species of both slow and fast-flowing waters.

== Relationship to humans ==
Many serrasalmids are in demand as aquarium ornamentals, and several pacus, such as Piaractus and Colossoma, are economically important to commercial fisheries and aquaculture.

Piranhas are generally less valued, although they are commonly consumed by subsistence fishers and frequently sold for food in local markets. A few piranha species occasionally appear in the aquarium trade, and, in recent decades, dried specimens have been marketed as tourist souvenirs. Piranhas occasionally bite and sometimes injure bathers and swimmers, but serious attacks are rare and the threat to humans has been exaggerated. However, piranhas are a considerable nuisance to commercial and sport fishers because they steal bait, mutilate catch, damage nets and other gear, and may bite when handled.
