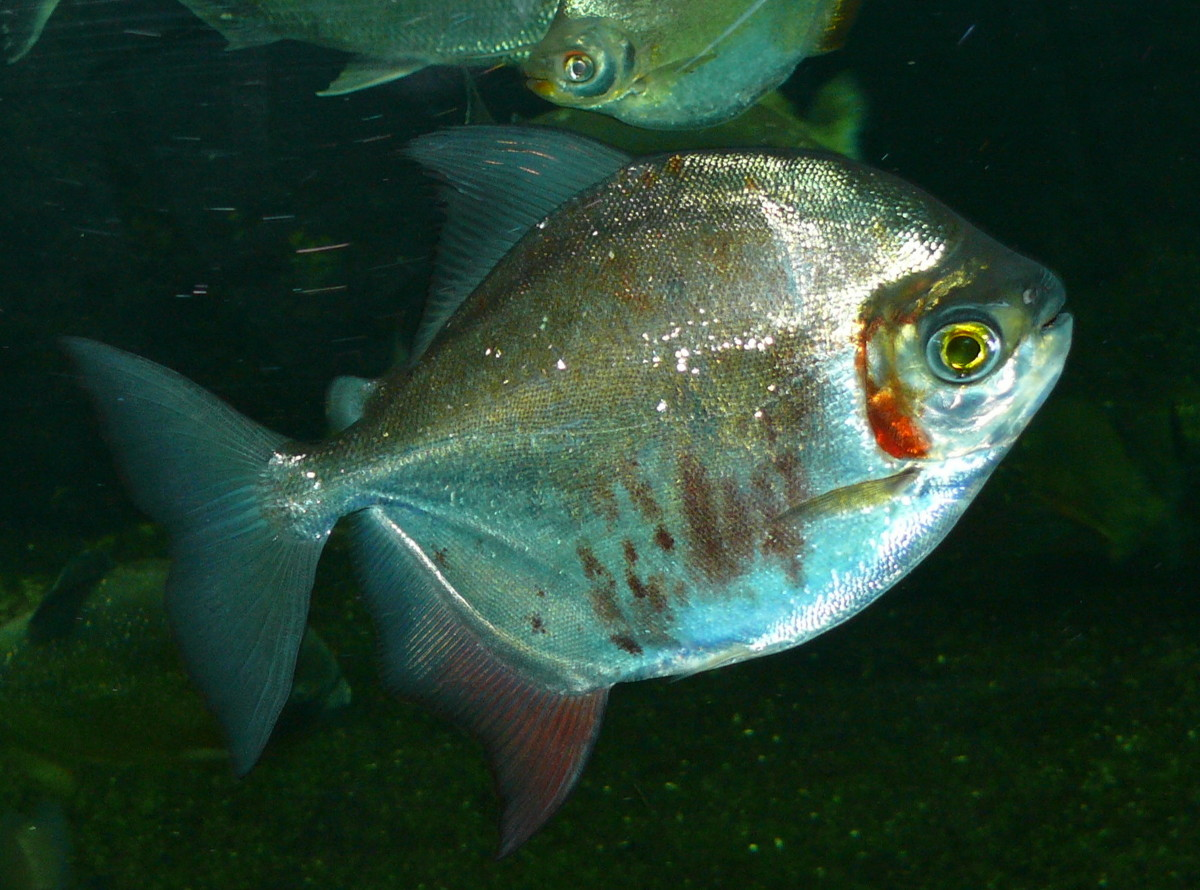
- Myleus sp.

Scientific classification
- Kingdom: Animalia
- Phylum: Chordata
- Class: Actinopterygii
- Order: Characiformes
- Family: Serrasalmidae
- Subfamily: Myleinae
- Genus: Myleus; J. P. Müller & Troschel, 1844

Type species
- Myleus setiger J. P. Müller & Troschel, 1844

= Myleus =

Genus of fishes

Myleus is a genus of serrasalmids from South America, where found in the Amazon, Orinoco and São Francisco basins, as well as the river basin of the Guiana Shield. They are found in rivers with moderately or fast-flowing water, including rapids. They are primarily herbivores, but also take some animal matter. Depending on the exact species, they reach up to 12–42 cm (0.4–1.4 ft) in standard length, and the adult males have a double-lobed anal fin and filamentous extensions on the dorsal fin. Their strong teeth means that larger individuals can inflict severe bites on humans.

== Species ==
There are currently 6 recognized species of Myleus:

- Myleus altipinnis (Valenciennes, 1850)
- Myleus knerii (Steindachner, 1881)
- Myleus micans (Lütken, 1875)
- Myleus pachyodus Andrade, Jégu, Buckup & Netto-Ferreira, 2018
- Myleus planquettei (Jégu, Keith & Le Bail, 2003)
- Myleus setiger J. P. Müller & Troschel, 1844
