= Ceratolacis =

Scientific classification
- Kingdom: Plantae
- Clade: Tracheophytes
- Clade: Angiosperms
- Clade: Eudicots
- Clade: Rosids
- Order: Malpighiales
- Family: Podostemaceae
- Genus: Ceratolacis (Tul.) Wedd.

Genus of flowering plants

Ceratolacis is a genus of flowering plants belonging to the family Podostemaceae.

Its native range is Brazil.

Species:

- Ceratolacis erythrolichen (Tul. & Wedd.) Wedd.
- Ceratolacis pedunculatum C.T.Philbrick, Novelo & Irgang
