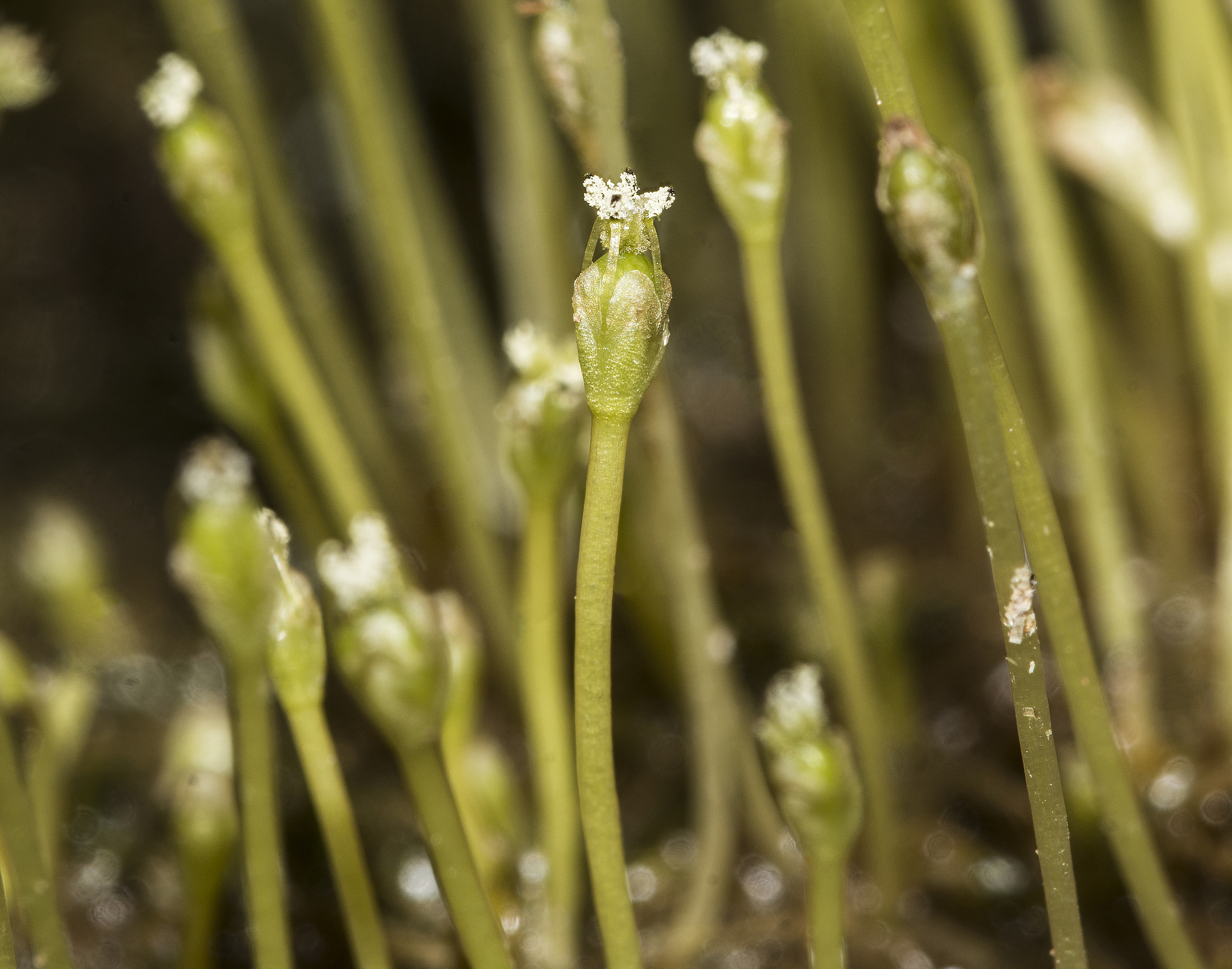
- Dalzellia ceylanica

Scientific classification
- Kingdom: Plantae
- Clade: Tracheophytes
- Clade: Angiosperms
- Clade: Eudicots
- Clade: Rosids
- Order: Malpighiales
- Family: Podostemaceae
- Subfamily: Tristichoideae
- Genus: Dalzellia; Wight (1852)

Species
- 10, see text

Synonyms
- Lawia Griff. ex Tul. (1849), nom. illeg.; Mnianthus Walp. (1852); Terniola Tul. (1852), nom. superfl.; Tulasnea Wight (1852)

= Dalzellia =

Genus of flowering plants

Dalzellia is a genus of flowering plants belonging to the family Podostemaceae.

Its native range is India and Sri Lanka, Indo-China (Thailand and Laos), and southeastern China.

Its genus name is in honour of Nicol Alexander Dalzell (1817–1878), a Scottish botanist. It was named in Icon. Pl. Ind. Orient. Vol.5 on page 34 in 1852.

== Species ==
Ten species are accepted.

- Dalzellia angustissima M.Kato
- Dalzellia attapeuensis Koi & M.Kato
- Dalzellia ceylanica (Gardner) Wight
- Dalzellia kailarsenii M.Kato
- Dalzellia microphylla Koi & M.Kato
- Dalzellia pseudoangustissima Koi & M.Kato
- Dalzellia ranongensis M.Kato
- Dalzellia sessilis (H.C.Chao) C.Cusset & G.Cusset
- Dalzellia sparsa Ampornpan, Werukamkul, M.Kato & Koi
- Dalzellia ubonensis M.Kato

=== Formerly placed here ===
- Indodalzellia gracilis (C.J.Mathew, Jäger-Zürn & Nileena) Koi & M.Kato (as Dalzellia gracilis C.J.Mathew, Jäger-Zürn & Nileena)
- Indotristicha ramosissima (Wight) P.Royen (as Dalzellia ramosissima Wight)
