= Torrenticola =

Torrenticola may refer to:

- Torrenticola (mite), a genus of arachnids in the family Torrenticolidae
- Torrenticola, a genus of flowering plants in the family Podostemaceae; synonym of Cladopus
