= Autana =

Autana may refer to:

- Cerro Autana, a mountain (tepui) of the Guiana Shield in Venezuela
- Autana River, a river in the middle Orinoco basin of Venezuela
- Autana Municipality, a municipality of Amazonas state of Venezuela, of which Isla Ratón is the administrative centre
- Autana, a genus of cellar spiders, now a junior synonym of Mesabolivar
- Autana, a monotypic genus of flowering plants
- Autana, a model of Toyota Land Cruiser
