= Ledermanniella keayi =

Conservation status
- Critically Endangered (IUCN 3.1)

Scientific classification
- Kingdom: Plantae
- Clade: Tracheophytes
- Clade: Angiosperms
- Clade: Eudicots
- Clade: Rosids
- Order: Malpighiales
- Family: Podostemaceae
- Genus: Ledermanniella
- Species: L. keayi

Binomial name
- Ledermanniella keayi (G.Taylor) C.Cusset

Species of flowering plant

Ledermanniella keayi is a species of plant in the family Podostemaceae. It is endemic to Cameroon. Its natural habitat is rivers. It is threatened by habitat loss.

It was first described in 1953 as Inversodicraea keayi by George Taylor, but the genus was revised to Ledermanniella by Colette Cusset in 1974
