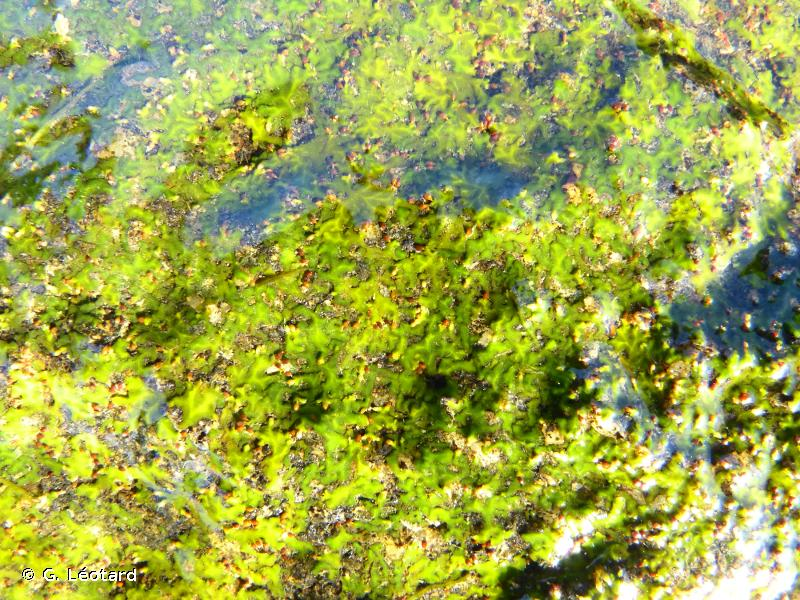
- Oserya perpusilla

Scientific classification
- Kingdom: Plantae
- Clade: Tracheophytes
- Clade: Angiosperms
- Clade: Eudicots
- Clade: Rosids
- Order: Malpighiales
- Family: Podostemaceae
- Genus: Oserya; Tul. & Wedd.

= Oserya =

Genus of flowering plant

Oserya is a genus of flowering plants belonging to the family Podostemaceae. Its native range is northern South America, and it is found in Bolivia, Brazil (north and west-central), French Guiana, Guyana, Suriname and Venezuela.

The genus name of Oserya is in honour of Alexandre Victor Eugène Hulot d'Osery (1819–1846), a French geologist and engineer.

== Taxonomy ==
It was first described and published in by Edmond Tulasne and Hugh Algernon Weddell in 1849. In 2011, The genus Noveloa was split from Oserya, and was made up of two Central American species: Oserya coulteriana and Oserya longiflora.

The following species are included in the genus according to Kew:

- Oserya biceps Tul. & Wedd.
- Oserya minima P.Royen
- Oserya perpusilla (Went) P.Royen
- Oserya pilgeri (Mildbr.) C.T.Philbrick & C.P.Bove
- Oserya sphaerocarpa Tul.
