= Zehnderia =

Scientific classification
- Kingdom: Plantae
- Clade: Tracheophytes
- Clade: Angiosperms
- Clade: Eudicots
- Clade: Rosids
- Order: Malpighiales
- Family: Podostemaceae
- Genus: Zehnderia; C.Cusset
- Species: Z. microgyna

Binomial name
- Zehnderia microgyna C.Cusset

Species of flowering plant

Zehnderia is a monotypic genus of flowering plants belonging to the family Podostemaceae. It only contains one known species, Zehnderia microgyna.

It is native to Cameroon. It is found growing near waterfalls.

== Description ==
It has crustose (crusty) roots and stems that are simple or branched, up to 1–3 cm (0–1 in) long. It has leaves that are ribbon-like, simple, 2–3 mm (0–0 in) long with stipules (small appendages at the bases of leaves). It has spathellas (a closed membranous sac which envelopes the immature flower) which is obovoid (ovoid with the broad end toward the apex), about 1.5 mm (0.059 in) long. The 0.7 mm long flowers, are inverted in unruptured spathella, which is arranged irregularly, either solitary or in clusters. The pedicels (flower stalk) are up to 1.5 cm (1 in) long when in fruit. It has 2 filiform (thread-like) tepals, which are 0.2-0.3 mm long, one each side of the base of andropodium. 2 (or rarely 3) stamens. The Anthers are about 0.7mm long. Pollen in monads (single individuals). The ovaries are 1 locular. The gynophore (a stalk supporting the gynoecium) is up to 8mm long. The seed capsules are globose (round in shape) 0.6-0.7 mm long. The valves are equal, each with 3 ribs. The stigmas are equal and linear, 0.7-0.8mm long.

It differs from Leiothylax (another Podostemaceae family genera) in having a ribbed capsule.

== Taxonomy ==
The genus name of Zehnderia is in honour of Alfons Zehnder (1920–1985), a Swiss teacher and botanist in Wettingen with a focus on algae. The Latin specific epithet of microgyna is a compound word, of micro meaning small and gyna from the Ancient Greek γυνή (gunḗ) meaning 'woman, female'. Both the genus and the species were first described and published in Fl. Cameroun Vol.30 on page 56 in 1987.
