= Castelnavia =

Scientific classification
- Kingdom: Plantae
- Clade: Tracheophytes
- Clade: Angiosperms
- Clade: Eudicots
- Clade: Rosids
- Order: Malpighiales
- Family: Podostemaceae
- Genus: Castelnavia; Tul. & Wedd.

Genus of flowering plants

Castelnavia is a genus of flowering plants belonging to the family Podostemaceae.

Its native range is Brazil.

Species:

- Castelnavia cuneifolia P.Royen
- Castelnavia fimbriata Tul. & Wedd.
- Castelnavia fluitans Tul. & Wedd.
- Castelnavia lindmaniana Warm.
- Castelnavia monandra Tul. & Wedd.
- Castelnavia multipartita Tul. & Wedd.
- Castelnavia noveloi C.T.Philbrick & C.P.Bove
- Castelnavia orthocarpa Tul. & Wedd.
- Castelnavia pendulosa (C.T.Philbrick & C.P.Bove) C.T.Philbrick & C.P.Bove
- Castelnavia princeps Tul. & Wedd.
- Castelnavia pusillina Tul. & Wedd.
- Castelnavia serpens Tul. & Wedd.
