= Paracladopus =

Scientific classification
- Kingdom: Plantae
- Clade: Tracheophytes
- Clade: Angiosperms
- Clade: Eudicots
- Clade: Rosids
- Order: Malpighiales
- Family: Podostemaceae
- Genus: Paracladopus; M.Kato (2006)

Species
- Paracladopus chantaburiensis Koi & M.Kato; Paracladopus chiangmaiensis M.Kato

Genus of flowering plants

Paracladopus is a genus of flowering plants in the family Podostemaceae. It includes two species native to Laos, Thailand, and Hainan. The genus is a sister to Cladopus.

== Species ==
Two species are accepted.

- Paracladopus chantaburiensis Koi & M.Kato – Chanthaburi Province of south-eastern Thailand
- Paracladopus chiangmaiensis M.Kato – Chiang Mai Province of northern Thailand, southern Laos, and Hainan
