= Paleodicraeia =

Scientific classification
- Kingdom: Plantae
- Clade: Tracheophytes
- Clade: Angiosperms
- Clade: Eudicots
- Clade: Rosids
- Order: Malpighiales
- Family: Podostemaceae
- Genus: Paleodicraeia; C.Cusset (1972 publ. 1973)
- Species: P. imbricata

Binomial name
- Paleodicraeia imbricata (Tul.) C.Cusset (1972 publ. 1973)

Synonyms
- Dicraeia imbricata Tul. (1849); Inversodicraea imbricata (Tul.) H.Perrier (1952)

Genus of plants

Paleodicraeia is a monotypic genus of flowering plants belonging to the family Podostemaceae. The only species is Paleodicraeia imbricata.

Its native range is Madagascar.
