= Polypleurum =

Scientific classification
- Kingdom: Plantae
- Clade: Tracheophytes
- Clade: Angiosperms
- Clade: Eudicots
- Clade: Rosids
- Order: Malpighiales
- Family: Podostemaceae
- Genus: Polypleurum (Tul.) Warm. (1901)

Species
- 19; see text

Synonyms
- Polypleurella Engl. (1927)

Genus of flowering plants

Polypleurum is a genus of flowering plants belonging to the family Podostemaceae.

Its native range is Tropical Asia.

== Species ==
19 species are accepted.

- Polypleurum chinense B.Hua Chen & Miao Zhang
- Polypleurum dichotomum (Gardner) J.B.Hall
- Polypleurum disciforme C.J.Mathew & Nileena
- Polypleurum elongatum (Gardner) J.B.Hall
- Polypleurum erectum M.Kato
- Polypleurum filifolium (Ramam. & J.Joseph) A.S.Rao & Hajra
- Polypleurum insulare M.Kato & Koi
- Polypleurum longicaule M.Kato
- Polypleurum longifolium M.Kato
- Polypleurum longistylosum M.Kato
- Polypleurum munnarense Nagendran & Arekal
- Polypleurum phuwuaense M.Kato
- Polypleurum pluricostatum Koi & M.Kato
- Polypleurum prachinburiense M.Kato & Koi
- Polypleurum prostratum C.J.Mathew & Nileena
- Polypleurum schmidtianum Warm.
- Polypleurum sisaketense M.Kato & Koi
- Polypleurum wallichii (R.Br. ex Griff.) Warm.
- Polypleurum wongprasertii M.Kato
