= Angolaea =

Scientific classification
- Kingdom: Plantae
- Clade: Tracheophytes
- Clade: Angiosperms
- Clade: Eudicots
- Clade: Rosids
- Order: Malpighiales
- Family: Podostemaceae
- Genus: Angolaea; Wedd. (1873)
- Species: A. fluitans

Binomial name
- Angolaea fluitans Wedd. (1873)

Genus of flowering plants

Angolaea fluitans is a species of flowering plant belonging to the family Podostemaceae. It is the sole species in genus Angolaea. It is an aquatic plant (helophyte) native to Angola and the Central African Republic.
