= Hanseniella =

Hanseniella may refer to:

- Hanseniella (myriapod), a genus of myriapods in the family Scutigerellidae
- Hanseniella (plant), a genus of plants in the family Podostemaceae
