= Laosia =

Laosia may refer to:

- Laosia (plant), a genus of plants in the family Podostemaceae
- Laosia, a genus of gastropods in the family Cyclophoridae, synonym of Laotia
- Laosia, a genus of beetles in the family Chrysomelidae, synonym of Laosaltica
