= Noveloa longifolia =

Scientific classification
- Kingdom: Plantae
- Clade: Tracheophytes
- Clade: Angiosperms
- Clade: Eudicots
- Clade: Rosids
- Order: Malpighiales
- Family: Podostemaceae
- Genus: Noveloa
- Species: N. longifolia

Binomial name
- Noveloa longifolia (Novelo & C.T.Philbrick) C.T.Philbrick

Synonyms
- Oserya longifolia Novelo & C.T.Philbrick

Species of plant

Noveloa longifolia is a species of flowering plant in the riverweed family Podostemaceae. It is native to river rapids in the Mexican states of Jalisco and Colima.
