= Noveloa =

Scientific classification
- Kingdom: Plantae
- Clade: Tracheophytes
- Clade: Angiosperms
- Clade: Eudicots
- Clade: Rosids
- Order: Malpighiales
- Family: Podostemaceae
- Genus: Noveloa; C.T.Philbrick

Species
- Noveloa coulteriana C.T.Philbrick; Noveloa longifolia C.T.Philbrick & Retana

Genus of flowering plants

Noveloa is a genus of aquatic flowering plants in the family Podostemaceae. Species of the genus are distributed across north and west Mexico in seasonally dry tropical areas, and plants are found in shallow, clear, fast-flowing rivers.

== Taxonomy ==
Noveloa was formally described in 2011 by C. Thomas Philbrick, and was named in honor of Alejandro Novelo Retana, an aquatic angiosperm researcher. It was split from the genus Oserya and is composed of two Central American species: Noveloa coulteriana and Noveloa longifolia.

=== Species ===
Noveloa coulteriana was originally described as Oserya coulteriana in 1849 by Edmond Tulasne and is the type species of the genus. Noveloa longifolia was originally described as Oserya longifolia in 1995 by Philbrick and Retana. It is found only in the states of Jalisco and Colima.

== Description ==
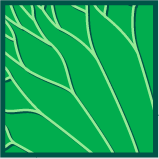
The veins of Noveloa leaves are dichotomous.

Noveloa shares most of its characteristics with Oserya, but varies in a few key ways. The leaf veins are dichotomous or subdichotomous, with all or most of them splitting in two. It also has between one and three stamens (as opposed to one), and its seed capsules have six ribs (as opposed to ten).

Species in the genus are annual or perennial plants and small herbs. They have flat roots that grow along the surface. The stems grow out sideways from the roots, with leaves arranged on opposite sides of the stem in an alternating pattern. The leaf stem has a circular or flat cross-section.

The flowers are bilaterally symmetrical and are hermaphroditic. Each flower is borne by one pedicel, and is covered in a sac-like structure with a club shape. The petals and sepals are indistinguishable, and there are 2–4 on a flower. There are 1–3 stamens per flower, which have anthers that are connected to the filament at their base. Each seed capsule has an average of 32 seeds, but there can be 0–85 at each extreme.

There are several ways to tell N. longifolia from N. coulteriana. The former is larger, with longer leaves but shorter petals. The leaf stem of N. longifolia is circular in cross-section and has visible spines, while in N. coulteriana it is flattened and does not have spines.

== Ecology ==
When N. coulteriana seeds are moistened, they secrete a sticky mucus substance before they germinate. They require rich red light to germinate, but are inhibited by far-red light. The seeds are incapable of becoming dormant; as such, they remain viable for less than six months. However, they do have a high rate of sprouting. This style of reproduction is different from other Mexican species of the family, like Marathrum foeniculaceum, M. plumosum, and Tristicha trifaria. Because of increasing pollution in the rivers, more of the light that the plants receive is far-red light, which could reduce germination of the species.
