= Lophogyne =

Scientific classification
- Kingdom: Plantae
- Clade: Tracheophytes
- Clade: Angiosperms
- Clade: Eudicots
- Clade: Rosids
- Order: Malpighiales
- Family: Podostemaceae
- Genus: Lophogyne; Tul.

Genus of plants

Lophogyne is a genus of flowering plants belonging to the family Podostemaceae.

Its native range is Northern South America to Brazil.

Species:

- Lophogyne aripuanensis (A.S.Tav.) C.T.Philbrick & C.P.Bove
- Lophogyne ceratophylla (Engl.) C.T.Philbrick & C.P.Bove
- Lophogyne divertens (Went) C.T.Philbrick & C.P.Bove
- Lophogyne fimbriata (P.Royen) C.T.Philbrick & C.P.Bove
- Lophogyne fimbrifolia (P.Royen) C.T.Philbrick & C.P.Bove
- Lophogyne goeldiana (A.S.Tav.) C.T.Philbrick & C.P.Bove
- Lophogyne isoetifolia (P.Royen) C.T.Philbrick & C.P.Bove
- Lophogyne lacunosa (Gardner) C.P.Bove & C.T.Philbrick
- Lophogyne paraensis (A.S.Tav.) C.T.Philbrick & C.P.Bove
- Lophogyne royenella C.P.Bove & C.T.Philbrick
- Lophogyne tridactylitifolia (Engl.) C.T.Philbrick & C.P.Bove
- Lophogyne varians (Engl.) C.T.Philbrick & C.P.Bove
