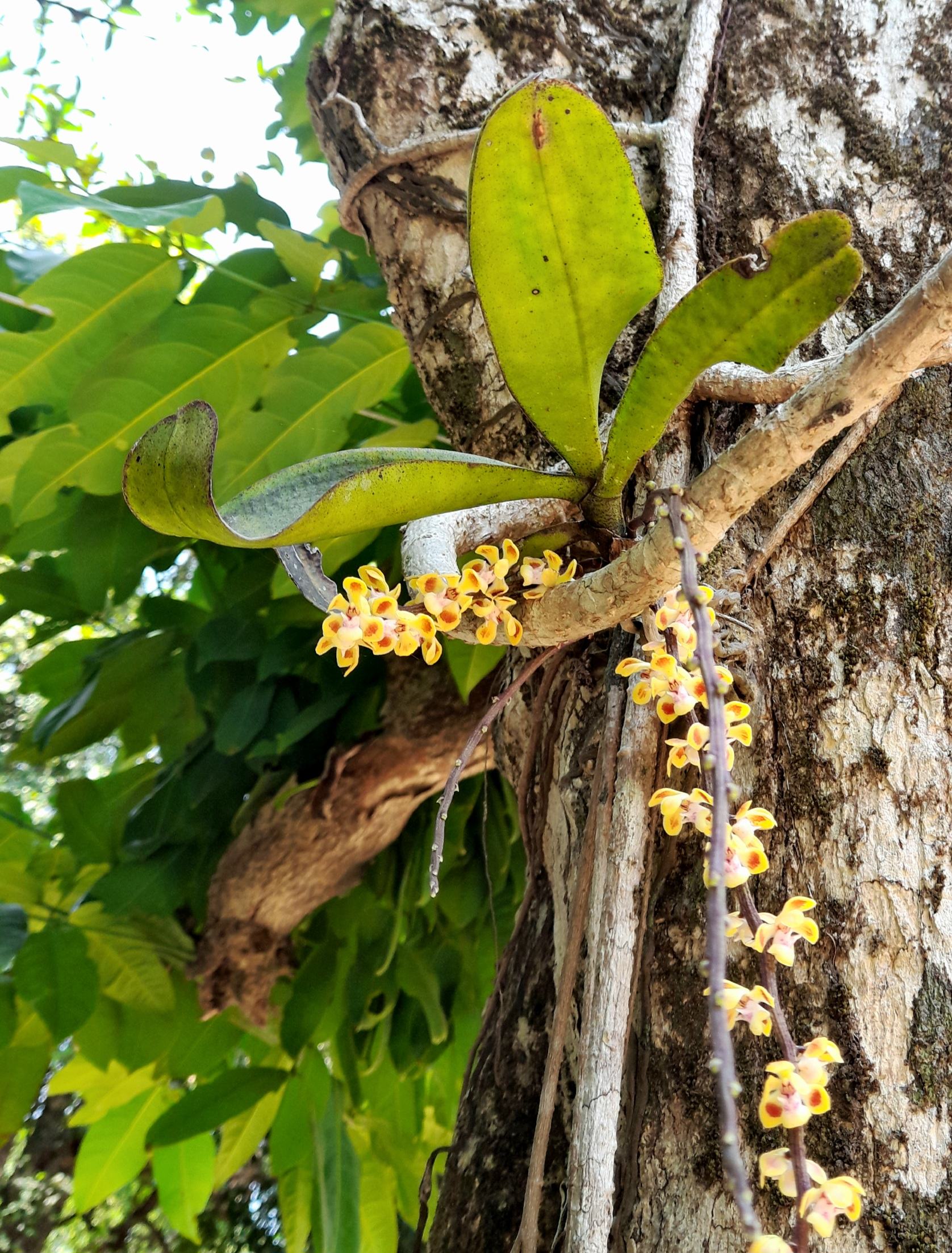

Conservation status
- Near Threatened (IUCN 3.1)

Scientific classification
- Kingdom: Plantae
- Clade: Tracheophytes
- Clade: Angiosperms
- Clade: Monocots
- Order: Asparagales
- Family: Orchidaceae
- Subfamily: Epidendroideae
- Genus: Smithsonia
- Species: S. maculata

Binomial name
- Smithsonia maculata (Dalzell) C.J.Saldanha

Synonyms
- Loxoma maculatum Garay Gastrochilus maculatus (Dalz.)

= Smithsonia maculata =

Species of orchid

Smithsonia maculata (commonly called spotted smithsonia) is a monopodial epiphytic orchid native to the Western Ghats.

Leaves are lanceolate and occur in groups of two or three with the more pointed ends at the base and have dimensions of 6 to 10 cm (2.4 to 3.9 in) long and 2 to 3 cm (0.79 to 1.18 in) wide. Flowers are seen in a drooping inflorescence .it has yellow color flower with bright orange-reddish spots on the sepals and horn like projections of side lobes of the labellum or lip with a pointy spur and trilobed .Flowering is seen mainly during mid-May to June.
