= Hubert Winkler =

German naturalist and botanist (1875–1941)

Hubert Winkler (13 February 1875 in Prenzlau – 10 June 1941 in Breslau) was a German botanist, who specialized in tropical flora research.

From 1895 he studied theology and botany at the University of Breslau, where in 1901/02 he worked as an assistant at the botanical garden. Afterwards, he worked at the Botanical Museum in Berlin and at the botanic garden in Victoria, Kamerun. In 1921 he became an associate professor of phytogeography at the University of Breslau, where in 1927 he attained a full professorship.

In 1905, botanist Adolf Engler published Winklerella, which is a genus of flowering plants from Cameroon, belonging to the family Podostemaceae. It was named in Hubert Winkler's honor.

In 1908 he conducted botanical studies in the Malay Peninsula and the Dutch East Indies, where he also collected rattan plants and seed for importation to German colonies. In 1910 he carried out botanical investigations in East Africa.

== Selected works ==
He was author of the volume on Betulaceae in Adolf Engler's Das Pflanzenreich and of the sections on Musaceae and Cannaceae in Engler and Prantl's Die Natürlichen Pflanzenfamilien. Other writings by Winkler include:

- Pflanzengeographische Studien über die Formation des Buchenwaldes, 1901 – Phytogeographical studies on the formation of beech forests.
- Beiträge zur Morphologie und Biologie tropischer Blüten und Früchte, 1906 – Contributions to the morphology and biology of tropical flowers and fruits.
- Eine akademische Studienfahrt nach Ostafrika (with Carl Zimmer, 1912) – An academic study excursion to East Africa.
- Botanisches Hilfsbuch für Pflanzer, Kolonialbeamte, Tropenkaufleute und Forschungsreisende, 1912 – Botanical guide for planters, colonial officers, tropical merchants and explorers.
- Entwicklungsgeschichte der Pflanzenwelt. Pflanzengeographie. Die Pflanzenwelt der Tropen, 1913 (with Walther Gothan, Robert Knud Friedrich Pilger, 1913) – Evolutionary history of the plant world / Plant geography / The plant world of the tropics.
