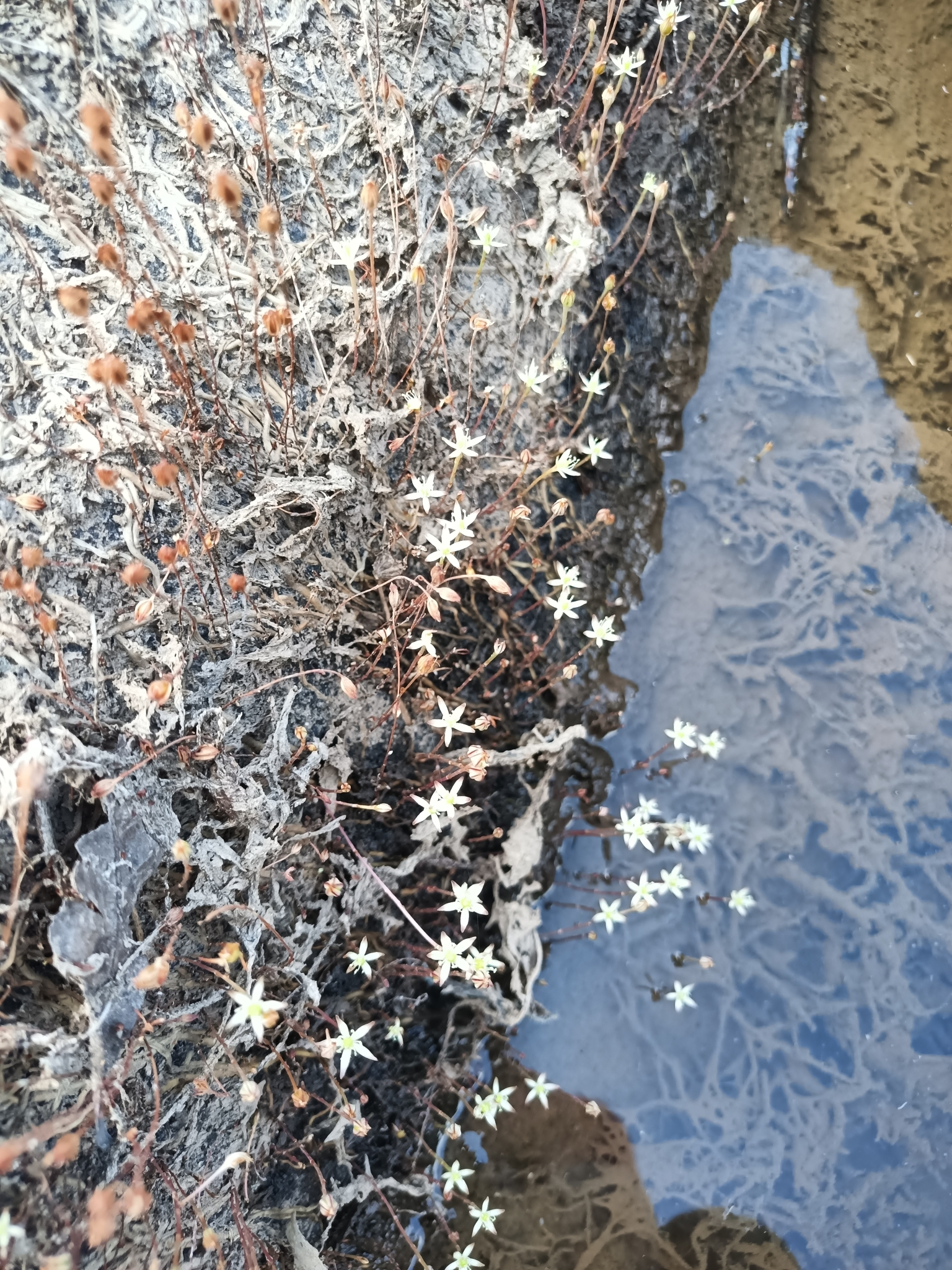

Scientific classification
- Kingdom: Plantae
- Clade: Tracheophytes
- Clade: Angiosperms
- Clade: Eudicots
- Clade: Rosids
- Order: Malpighiales
- Family: Podostemaceae
- Genus: Weddellina; Tul.
- Species: W. squamulosa

Binomial name
- Weddellina squamulosa Tul.

= Weddellina =

Species of flowering plant

Weddellina is a monotypic genus of flowering plants belonging to the family Podostemaceae. It only contains one known species, Weddellina squamulosa.

It is native to Brazil, Colombia, French Guiana, Guyana, Suriname and Venezuela in Southern America.

There 2 accepted forms;

- Weddellina squamulosa f. squamulosa
- Weddellina squamulosa f. uaupensis (Benth.) P.Royen

The genus name of Weddellina is in honour of Hugh Algernon Weddell (1819–1877), an English physician and botanist, specialising in South American flora. The Latin specific epithet of squamulosa means having small scales, derived from Latin squamula (meaning “small scales”). Both the genus and the species were first described and published in Ann. Sci. Nat., Bot., séries 3, Vol.11 on page 113 in 1849.

== Other sources ==
- Boggan, J. Funck, V. & Kelloff, C. (1997). Checklist of the Plants of the Guianas (Guyana, Surinam, Franch Guiana) ed. 2: 1–238. University of Guyana, Georgetown.
- Hokche, O., Berry, P.E. & Huber, O. (eds.) (2008). Nuevo Catálogo de la Flora Vascular de Venezuela: 1–859. Fundación Instituto Botánico de Venezuela.
- de Moura Júnior, E.G. & al. (2015). Updated checklist of aquatic macrophytes from Northern Brazil Acta Amazonica 45: 111–132.
