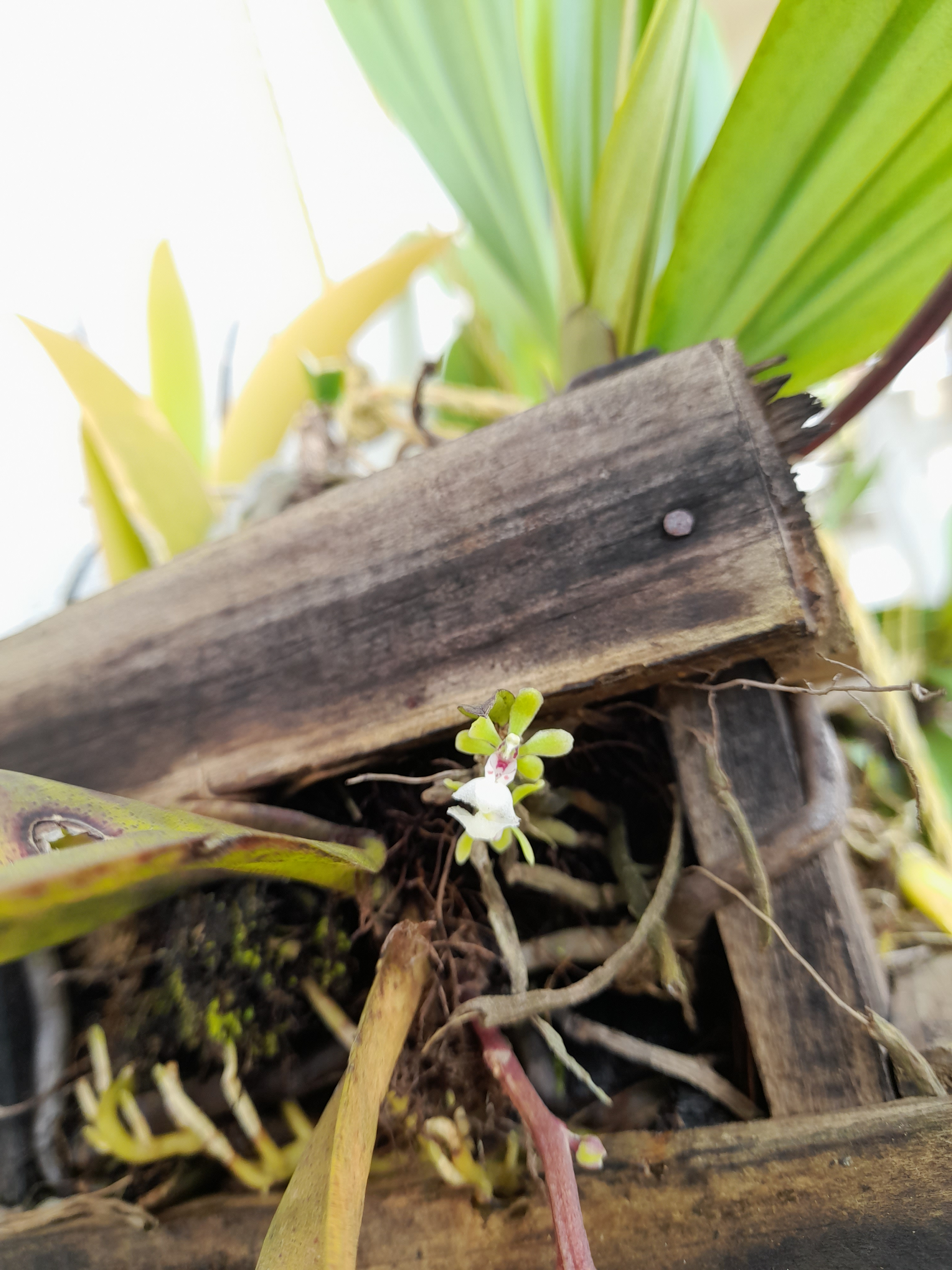
- smithsonia viridiflora in conservation

Scientific classification
- Kingdom: Plantae
- Clade: Tracheophytes
- Clade: Angiosperms
- Clade: Monocots
- Order: Asparagales
- Family: Orchidaceae
- Subfamily: Epidendroideae
- Genus: Smithsonia
- Species: S. viridiflora

Binomial name
- Smithsonia viridiflora (Dalzell) C.J.Saldanha

Synonyms
- Aerides dalzelliana; Sarcochilus dalzelliana; Micropera viridiflora

= Smithsonia viridiflora =

Species of orchid

Smithsonia viridiflora, commonly known as the green smithsonia, is an epiphytic orchid native to the Western Ghats of Karnataka and Maharashtra. It is 3–10 cm (1.2–3.9 in) long with light fluorescent green color petals and a distinguishable lip like other Smithsonia species.
