= Macropodiella pellucida =

Conservation status
- Endangered (IUCN 3.1)

Scientific classification
- Kingdom: Plantae
- Clade: Tracheophytes
- Clade: Angiosperms
- Clade: Eudicots
- Clade: Rosids
- Order: Malpighiales
- Family: Podostemaceae
- Genus: Macropodiella
- Species: M. pellucida

Binomial name
- Macropodiella pellucida (Engl.) C.Cusset

Synonyms
- Inversodicraea pellucida Engl.; Ledermanniella pellucida (Engl.) C.Cusset

Species of flowering plant

Macropodiella pellucida is a species of plant in the family Podostemaceae. It is endemic to Cameroon. Its natural habitats are subtropical or tropical moist lowland forests and rivers. It is threatened by habitat loss.
