= Hydrodiscus =

Conservation status
- Least Concern (IUCN 3.1)

Scientific classification
- Kingdom: Plantae
- Clade: Tracheophytes
- Clade: Angiosperms
- Clade: Eudicots
- Clade: Rosids
- Order: Malpighiales
- Family: Podostemaceae
- Genus: Hydrodiscus; Koi & M.Kato (2010)
- Species: H. koyamae

Binomial name
- Hydrodiscus koyamae (M.Kato & Fukuoka) Koi & M.Kato (2010)

Synonyms
- Diplobryum koyamae M.Kato & Fukuoka (2002)

Genus of flowering plants

Hydrodiscus koyamae is a species of flowering plant in the family Podostemaceae. It is the sole species in genus Hydrodiscus. It is an aquatic subshrub endemic to north-central Laos.

Hydrodiscus koyamae grows on rocks in seasonally-inundated stream rapids and waterfalls. It roots to rocks with a flattened cylindrical disk, from which many-branched shoots grow out to one meter in length.

It is known from only three locations in Phuu Khao Khouay National Park in Bolikhamsai Province of north-central Laos. The type specimen was collected in Tat Luek Nam Tok (Tad Leuk waterfall).

The species was first named Diplobryum koyamae in 2002. Its body plan is distinct from other species of Diplobryum, and in 2010 the species was placed in its own genus as Hydrodiscus koyamae.
