= Zeylanidium =

Scientific classification
- Kingdom: Plantae
- Clade: Embryophytes
- Clade: Tracheophytes
- Clade: Angiosperms
- Clade: Eudicots
- Clade: Rosids
- Order: Malpighiales
- Family: Podostemaceae
- Subfamily: Podostemoideae
- Genus: Zeylanidium (Tul.) Engl.

Species
- See text

Synonyms
- Hydrobryopsis Engl.

Genus of flowering plants

Zeylanidium are a genus of flowering plants in the riverweed family Podostemaceae, native to Sri Lanka, India, Myanmar and Thailand. They have caducous leaves and either crustose or ribbon‑shaped thalli.

== Species ==
Currently accepted species include:

- Zeylanidium barberi (Willis) C.Cusset → Possibly Podostemum barberi Willis
- Zeylanidium crustaceum M.Kato
- Zeylanidium johnsonii (Wight) Engl. (doubtful)
- Zeylanidium lichenoides (Kurz) Engl.
- Zeylanidium maheshwarii C.J.Mathew & Satheesh
- Zeylanidium manasiae R.Krishnan, P.Khanduri & R.Tandon
- Zeylanidium olivaceum (Gardner) Engl.
- Zeylanidium sessile (Willis) C.D.K.Cook & Rutish.
- Zeylanidium subulatum (Gardner) C.Cusset → Possibly Podostemum subulatum Gardner
- Zeylanidium tailichenoides M.Kato & Koi
