= Saxicolella marginalis =

Conservation status
- Critically Endangered (IUCN 3.1)

Scientific classification
- Kingdom: Plantae
- Clade: Tracheophytes
- Clade: Angiosperms
- Clade: Eudicots
- Clade: Rosids
- Order: Malpighiales
- Family: Podostemaceae
- Genus: Saxicolella
- Species: S. marginalis

Binomial name
- Saxicolella marginalis (G.Taylor) C.Cusset ex Cheek

Synonyms
- Butumia marginalis G.Taylor

Species of flowering plant

Saxicolella marginalis is a species of flowering plant in the family Podostemaceae. It is a hydroannual native to northwestern Cameroon and southeastern Nigeria. Its natural habitat is rivers.
