= Ledermanniella letouzeyi =

Conservation status
- Endangered (IUCN 3.1)

Scientific classification
- Kingdom: Plantae
- Clade: Tracheophytes
- Clade: Angiosperms
- Clade: Eudicots
- Clade: Rosids
- Order: Malpighiales
- Family: Podostemaceae
- Genus: Ledermanniella
- Species: L. letouzeyi

Binomial name
- Ledermanniella letouzeyi C.Cusset

Species of flowering plant

Ledermanniella letouzeyi is a species of plant in the family Podostemaceae. It is endemic to Cameroon. Its natural habitats are subtropical or tropical moist lowland forests and rivers. It is threatened by habitat loss.
