= Torrenticolidae =

Scientific classification
- Kingdom: Animalia
- Phylum: Arthropoda
- Subphylum: Chelicerata
- Class: Arachnida
- Order: Trombidiformes
- Superfamily: Lebertioidea
- Family: Torrenticolidae; Thor, 1902

Family of mites

Torrenticolidae is a family of torrent mites in the order Trombidiformes. There are about 5 genera and at least 20 described species in Torrenticolidae.

== Genera ==
- Monatractides
- Neoatractides
- Pseudotorrenticola
- Testudacarus Walter, 1928
- Torrenticola Piersig, 1896
