= Terniopsis =

Scientific classification
- Kingdom: Plantae
- Clade: Tracheophytes
- Clade: Angiosperms
- Clade: Eudicots
- Clade: Rosids
- Order: Malpighiales
- Family: Podostemaceae
- Subfamily: Tristichoideae
- Genus: Terniopsis; H.C.Chao (1948 publ. 1949)

Synonyms
- Malaccotristicha C.Cusset & G.Cusset (1988)

Genus of flowering plants

Terniopsis is a genus of flowering plants belonging to the family Podostemaceae.

Its native range is Thailand, Laos, southeastern China, and Hainan.

== Species ==
13 species are accepted.

- Terniopsis brevis M.Kato
- Terniopsis chanthaburiensis M.Kato & Koi
- Terniopsis daoyinensis Q.W.Lin, Gang Lu & Z.Y.Li
- Terniopsis filiformis Werukamkul, Ampornpan, Koi & M.Kato
- Terniopsis heterostaminata Werukamkul, Ampornpan, Koi & M.Kato
- Terniopsis microstigma Koi & M.Kato
- Terniopsis minor M.Kato & Koi
- Terniopsis ramosa M.Kato
- Terniopsis savannaketensis Koi & M.Kato
- Terniopsis sesadensis Koi & M.Kato
- Terniopsis ubonensis M.Kato
- Terniopsis vapyensis Koi & M.Kato
- Terniopsis yongtaiensis X.X.Su, Miao Zhang & B.Hua Chen
