= Wettsteiniola =

Scientific classification
- Kingdom: Plantae
- Clade: Tracheophytes
- Clade: Angiosperms
- Clade: Eudicots
- Clade: Rosids
- Order: Malpighiales
- Family: Podostemaceae
- Genus: Wettsteiniola; Suess.

Genus of flowering plants

Wettsteiniola is a genus of flowering plants belonging to the family Podostemaceae.

It is native to Brazil.

Known species:

- Wettsteiniola accorsii (Toledo) P.Royen
- Wettsteiniola apipensis Tur
- Wettsteiniola pinnata Suess.

The genus name of Wettsteiniola is in honour of Richard Wettstein (1863–1931), an Austrian botanist. It was first described and published in Repert. Spec. Nov. Regni Veg. Vol.39 on page 18 in 1935.
