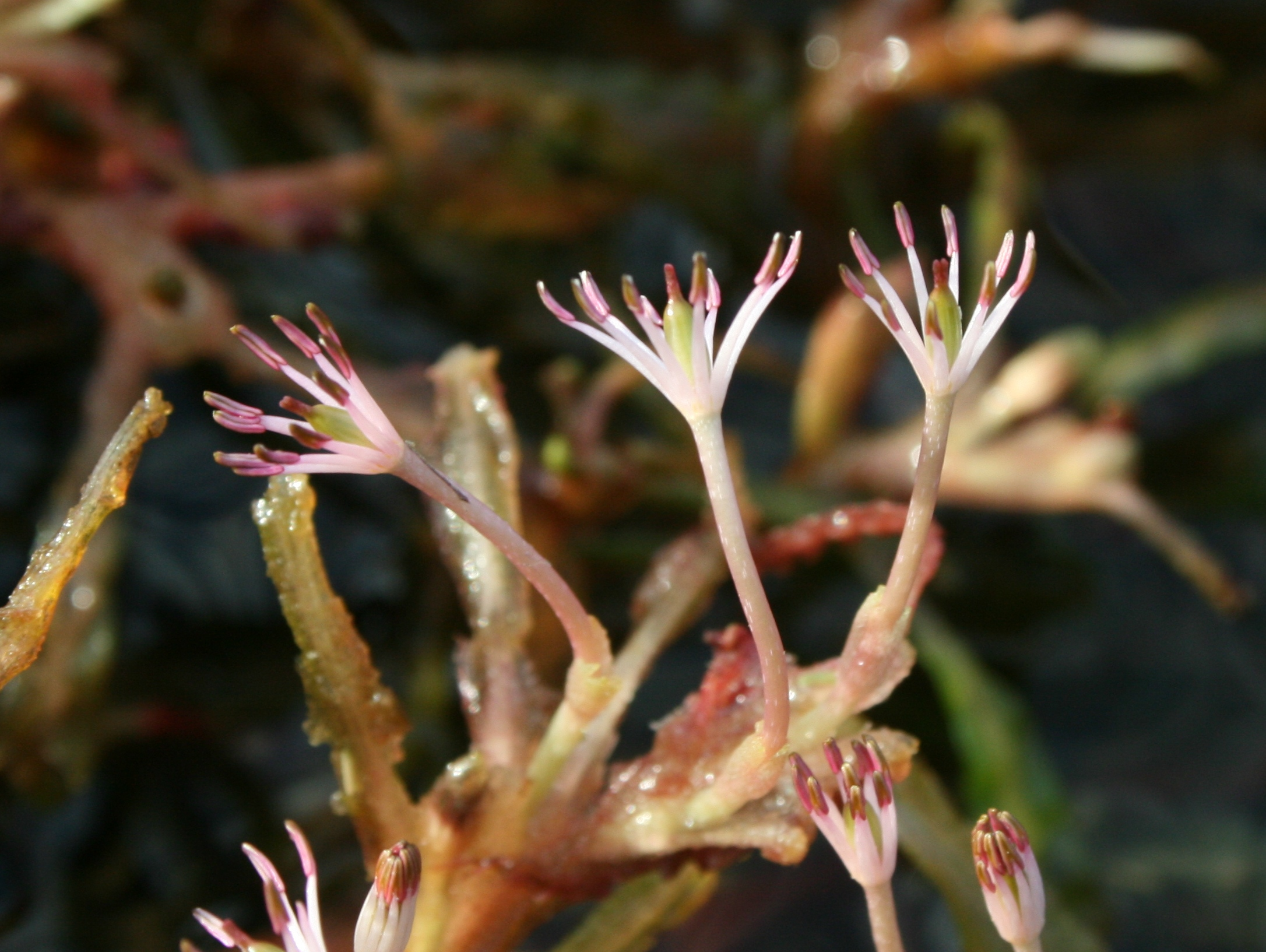
- Apinagia longifolia

Scientific classification
- Kingdom: Plantae
- Clade: Tracheophytes
- Clade: Angiosperms
- Clade: Eudicots
- Clade: Rosids
- Order: Malpighiales
- Family: Podostemaceae
- Genus: Apinagia; Tul.

= Apinagia =

Genus of flowering plants

Apinagia is a genus of flowering plants belonging to the family Podostemaceae.

Its native range is Southern Tropical America.

Species:

- Apinagia aripecuruensis P.Royen
- Apinagia arminensis P.Royen
- Apinagia batrachiifolia (Mildbr.) P.Royen
- Apinagia brejoagrestinensis A.S.Tav. & Sobral-Leite
- Apinagia brevicaulis Mildbr.
- Apinagia crispa P.Royen
- Apinagia digitata P.Royen
- Apinagia dissecta (Montagn.) Engl.
- Apinagia divaricata Tul. & Wedd.
- Apinagia flexuosa (Tul.) P.Royen
- Apinagia fluitans P.Royen
- Apinagia fucoides (Mart.) Tul.
- Apinagia gardneriana Tul.
- Apinagia glaziovii (Warm.) P.Royen
- Apinagia goejei Went
- Apinagia guairaensis Fiebrig
- Apinagia guyanensis (Pulle) P.Royen
- Apinagia hulkiana (Went) P.Royen
- Apinagia itanensis Schnell
- Apinagia kochii (Engl.) P.Royen
- Apinagia latifolia (K.I.Goebel) P.Royen
- Apinagia leptophylla (K.I.Goebel) P.Royen
- Apinagia longifolia (Tul.) P.Royen
- Apinagia marowynensis (Went) P.Royen
- Apinagia membranacea (Bong.) Tul.
- Apinagia multibranchiata (Matthiesen) P.Royen
- Apinagia petiolata Hollander
- Apinagia platystigma P.Royen
- Apinagia pusilla Tul.
- Apinagia richardiana (Tul.) P.Royen
- Apinagia ruppioides (Kunth) Tul.
- Apinagia spruceana (Wedd.) Engl.
- Apinagia staheliana (Went) P.Royen
- Apinagia surumuensis (Engl.) P.Royen
- Apinagia tenuifolia P.Royen
- Apinagia treslingiana (Went) P.Royen
- Apinagia versteegiana (Went) P.Royen
