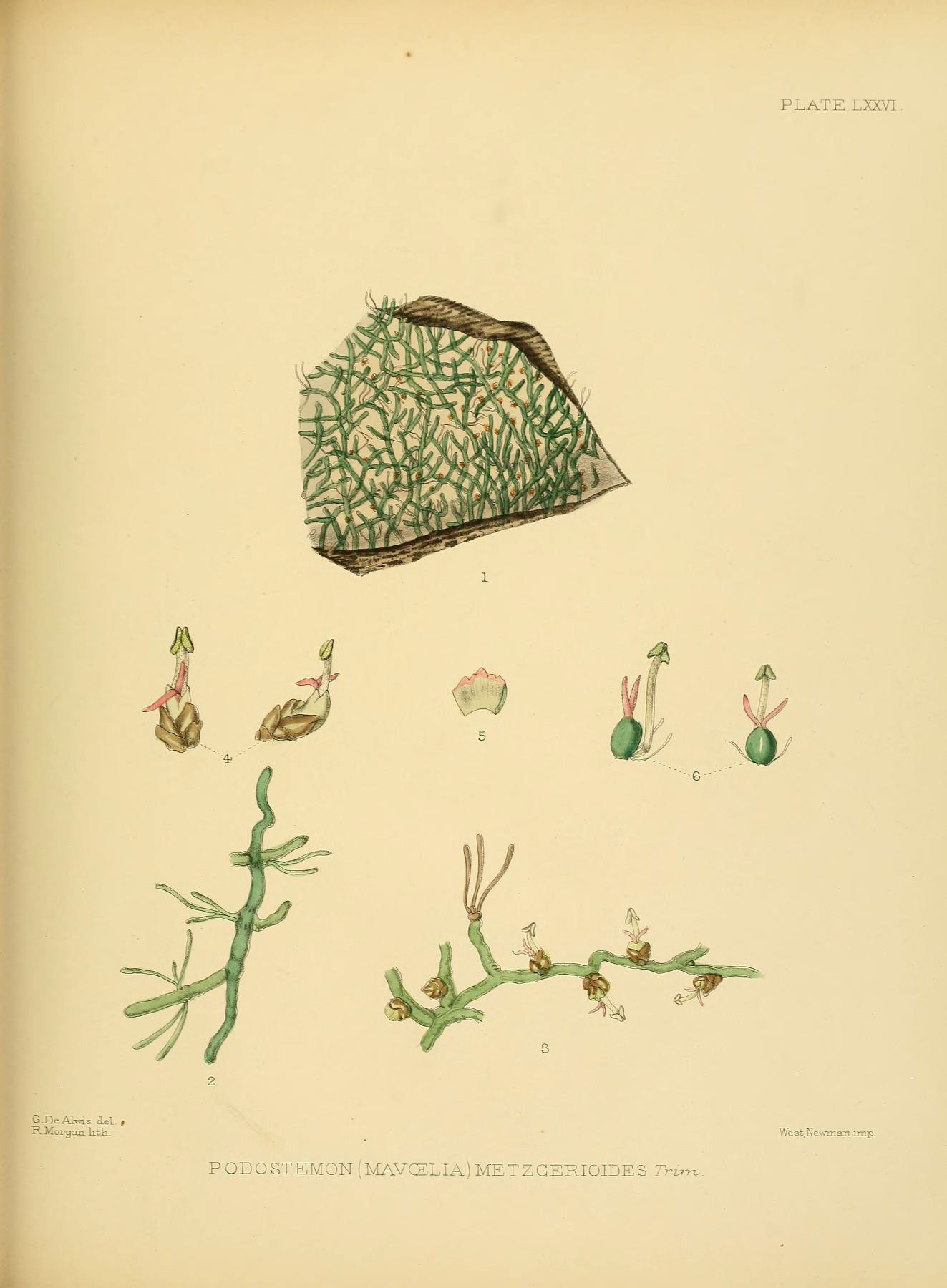
- Farmeria metzgerioides botanical illustration

Scientific classification
- Kingdom: Plantae
- Clade: Tracheophytes
- Clade: Angiosperms
- Clade: Eudicots
- Clade: Rosids
- Clade: Fabids
- Order: Malpighiales
- Family: Podostemaceae
- Genus: Farmeria; Willis ex Hook.f.

Species
- See text

Synonyms
- Maferria C.Cusset

= Farmeria =

Genus of Podostemaceae plants

Farmeria is a genus of flowering plants in the riverweed family Podostemaceae, native to Sri Lanka and India. They attach to rocks using holdfasts, and their flowers are protected by boat-shaped spathella until they emerge.

== Species ==
Currently accepted species include:

- Farmeria indica Willis
- Farmeria metzgerioides (Trimen) Willis ex Hook.f.
