= Letestuella =

Scientific classification
- Kingdom: Plantae
- Clade: Tracheophytes
- Clade: Angiosperms
- Clade: Eudicots
- Clade: Rosids
- Order: Malpighiales
- Family: Podostemaceae
- Genus: Letestuella; G.Taylor
- Species: L. tisserantii

Binomial name
- Letestuella tisserantii G.Taylor

Synonyms
- Letestuella chevalieri G.Taylor

Genus of plants

Letestuella is a monotypic genus of flowering plants belonging to the family Podostemaceae. The only species is Letestuella tisserantii G.Taylor

Its native range is western Tropical Africa to Namibia. It is also found in the countries of Angola, Benin, Cameroon, Central African Republic, Ivory Coast, Mali, Niger and Togo.

The genus name of Letestuella is in honour of Georges Marie Patrice Charles Le Testu (1877–1967), a French colonial administrator in tropical Africa and was later at a botanical garden in Caen. The Latin specific epithet of tisserantii refers to botanist Charles Tisserant, (1886-1962). Both genus and species were first described and published in Bull. Brit. Mus. (Nat. Hist.), Bot. Vol.1 on page 57 in 1953.
