= Sphaerothylax =

Scientific classification
- Kingdom: Plantae
- Clade: Tracheophytes
- Clade: Angiosperms
- Clade: Eudicots
- Clade: Rosids
- Order: Malpighiales
- Family: Podostemaceae
- Genus: Sphaerothylax; Bisch. ex C.Krauss (1844)

Synonyms
- Anastrophea Wedd. (1873); Isothylax Baill. (1890)

Genus of plants

Sphaerothylax is a genus of flowering plants belonging to the family Podostemaceae.

Its native range is Cameroon to Ethiopia and Southern Africa, Madagascar.

== Species ==
Four species are accepted.

- Sphaerothylax abyssinica (Wedd.) Warm.
- Sphaerothylax algiformis Bisch. ex C.Krauss
- Sphaerothylax bemarivensis H.Perrier
- Sphaerothylax sphaerocarpa (Engl.) G.Taylor
