= Lebbiea =

Conservation status
- Critically Endangered (IUCN 3.1)

Scientific classification
- Kingdom: Plantae
- Clade: Tracheophytes
- Clade: Angiosperms
- Clade: Eudicots
- Clade: Rosids
- Order: Malpighiales
- Family: Podostemaceae
- Genus: Lebbiea
- Species: L. grandiflora

Binomial name
- Lebbiea grandiflora Cheek 2018

Monotypic genus of plants

Lebbiea is a monotypic genus of plants within the family Podostemaceae, with Lebbiea grandiflora as its only species. It is a critically endangered species of rheophytic herb native to Sierra Leone and Guinea. It was discovered by, and named after, professor Aiah Lebbie in 2018.

== Description ==
Lebbiea is a small rheophytic herb growing on bare rocks submerged in flowing, well aerated clear water. The genus has a distinct flower morphology within Podostemaceae, and has a pillar-like haptera which completely elevates the horizontal root and the shoot above the substrate. The flowers are the largest of any African species of Podostemaceae, hence the species name L. grandiflora. Lebbiae thrives during the wet season, surviving the dry season only as seeds.

== Range and conservation ==
Lebbiea is only known from two sites, the fast-moving currents beneath Sewa Rapids in Sierra Leone and the Koukoutamba falls in Guinea. The Sewa Rapids is being adversely affected by silt from mining, and both sites are earmarked for hydroelectric projects. The extremely small range and the development projects caused the plant to be listed as critically endangered.
