= Endocaulos =

Scientific classification
- Kingdom: Plantae
- Clade: Tracheophytes
- Clade: Angiosperms
- Clade: Eudicots
- Clade: Rosids
- Order: Malpighiales
- Family: Podostemaceae
- Genus: Endocaulos; C.Cusset (1972 publ. 1973)
- Species: E. mangorense

Binomial name
- Endocaulos mangorense (H.Perrier) C.Cusset (1972 publ. 1973)

Synonyms
- Inversodicraea mangorensis (H.Perrier) H.Perrier (1952); Sphaerothylax mangorensis H.Perrier (1929)

Genus of plants

Endocaulos is a monotypic genus of flowering plants belonging to the family Podostemaceae. The only species is Endocaulos mangorense.

Its native range is Madagascar.
