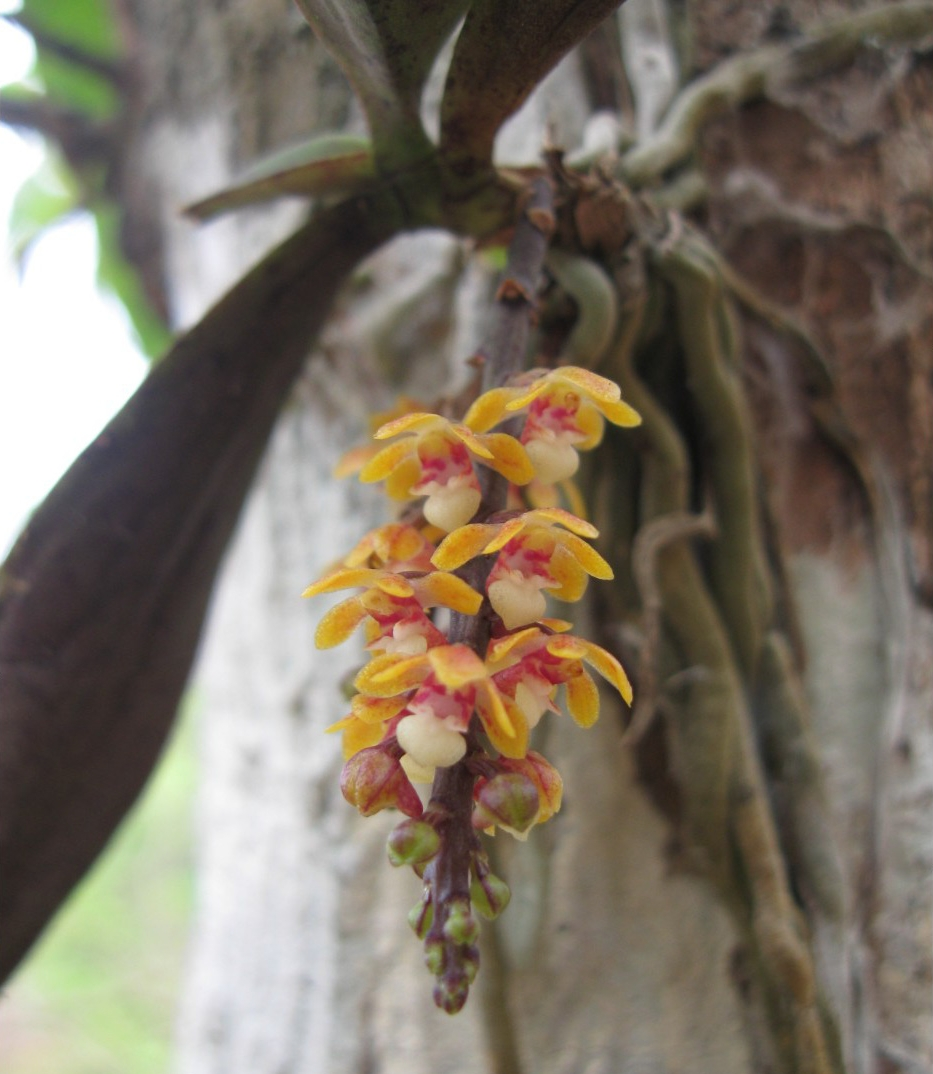

Scientific classification
- Kingdom: Plantae
- Clade: Tracheophytes
- Clade: Angiosperms
- Clade: Monocots
- Order: Asparagales
- Family: Orchidaceae
- Subfamily: Epidendroideae
- Genus: Smithsonia
- Species: S. straminea

Binomial name
- Smithsonia straminea C.J.Saldanha

Synonyms
- Loxoma straminea

= Smithsonia straminea =

Species of orchid

Smithsonia straminea, commonly known as the straw-colored smithsonia, is a small 4–9 cm (1.6–3.5 in) growing epiphytic orchid native to the Western Ghats of Karnataka, Maharashtra, and rarely Kerala in India.
