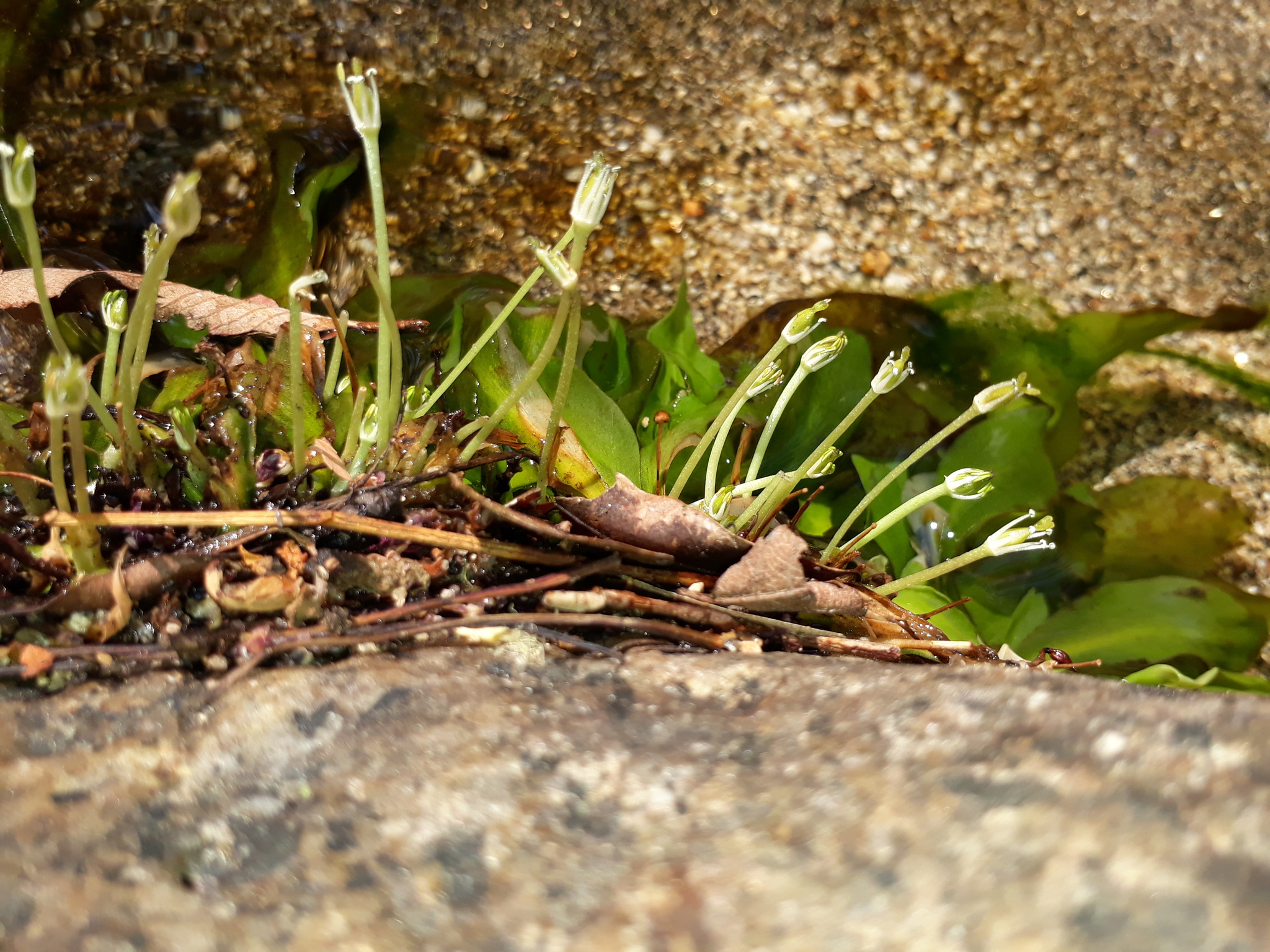
- Marathrum utile

Scientific classification
- Kingdom: Plantae
- Clade: Tracheophytes
- Clade: Angiosperms
- Clade: Eudicots
- Clade: Rosids
- Order: Malpighiales
- Family: Podostemaceae
- Genus: Marathrum; Bonpl. (1806)

Synonyms
- Vanroyenella Novelo & C.T.Philbrick (1993)

= Marathrum =

Genus of plants

Marathrum is a genus of flowering plants belonging to the family Podostemaceae.

Its native range is Mexico to tropical America.

== Description ==
Small to medium-sized stemless herbs known to be attached to roots in only a few species, the sterile plants often larger and coarser than the fertile, with an irregular, sometimes branched, adhesive base. Leaves either distichous or inserted along the margin of the thalloid base, repeatedly pinnate with all the pinnae alternate or slightly opposite, or entire with a few lobes along the margin; petiole sometimes fleshy, often dilated at the base. Flowers at first enclosed in a persistent, membranaceous spathe which splits irregularly at the tip, 1 to many, solitary or fascicled between the leaf-bases; pedicel scarcely enlarged at the tip in some species, in others abruptly enlarged; tepals 3–25 in a complete or incomplete whorl, inconspicuous, squamiform to filiform, inserted on the margin of the receptacle in species with enlarged pedicels, but sometimes inserted at different levels in species with normal or scarcely enlarged pedicels; stamens 2-25, in a complete or incomplete whorl (the latter unknown in Panamanian species), rarely united at the base, the filaments lanceolate, 3-angled at the base, sometimes branched, nerved, the anthers sagittate, introrse; pollen ellipsoidal to subglobose, 3-sulcate; ovary 2- celled, ellipsoidal, attenuate at the base, with 2 equal carpels, 8-ribbed; placenta of the same shape as the ovary, with many ovules; styles 2, filiform or cylindric, cohering at the base or very rarely free, often emarginate. Fruit with 2 equal, persistent, 5-ribbed valves.

== Species ==
12 species are accepted.

- Marathrum azarensis Tur
- Marathrum capillaceum (Pulle) P.Royen
- Marathrum cubanum C.Wright
- Marathrum foeniculaceum Bonpl.
- Marathrum pauciflorum Tul.
- Marathrum plumosum (Novelo & C.T.Philbrick) C.T.Philbrick & C.P.Bove
- Marathrum rubrum Novelo & C.T.Philbrick
- Marathrum schiedeanum Cham.
- Marathrum striatifolium P.Royen
- Marathrum tenue Liebm.
- Marathrum trichophorum P.Royen
- Marathrum utile Tul.
