= Djinga =

Scientific classification
- Kingdom: Plantae
- Clade: Tracheophytes
- Clade: Angiosperms
- Clade: Eudicots
- Clade: Rosids
- Order: Malpighiales
- Family: Podostemaceae
- Genus: Djinga; C.Cusset

Genus of flowering plants

Djinga is a genus of flowering plants belonging to the family Podostemaceae.

Its native range is Western Central Tropical Africa.

Species:

- Djinga cheekii Ghogue, Huber & Rutish.
- Djinga felicis C.Cusset
