= Cussetia =

Scientific classification
- Kingdom: Plantae
- Clade: Tracheophytes
- Clade: Angiosperms
- Clade: Eudicots
- Clade: Rosids
- Order: Malpighiales
- Family: Podostemaceae
- Subfamily: Tristichoideae
- Genus: Cussetia; M.Kato

Genus of flowering plants

Cussetia is a genus of flowering plants belonging to the family Podostemaceae.

Its native range is Indo-China.

Species:

- Cussetia carinata (Lecomte) M.Kato
- Cussetia diversifolia (Lecomte) M.Kato
