= Indotristicha =

Conservation status
- Least Concern (IUCN 3.1)

Scientific classification
- Kingdom: Plantae
- Clade: Tracheophytes
- Clade: Angiosperms
- Clade: Eudicots
- Clade: Rosids
- Order: Malpighiales
- Family: Podostemaceae
- Genus: Indotristicha; P.Royen (1959)
- Species: I. ramosissima

Binomial name
- Indotristicha ramosissima (Wight) P.Royen (1959)

Synonyms
- Dalzellia ramosissima Wight (1852); Lawia ramosissima (Wight) Kuntze (1891); Terniola ramosissima (Wight) Wedd. (1873); Tristicha ramosissima (Wight) Willis (1902); Tulasnea ramosissima Wight (1852)

Genus of plants

Indotristicha ramosissima is a species of flowering plant belonging to the family Podostemaceae. It is the sole species in genus Indotristicha.

== Distribution ==
It is an aquatic annual or perennial endemic to southwestern India.

It is widespread in rivers flowing from the Western Ghats in southwestern India, in the states of Karnataka, Kerala, Maharashtra and Tamil Nadu, and can be locally abundant.

== Species ==
The genus formerly contained a second species, Indotristicha tirunelveliana B.D.Sharma, Karthik. & B.V.Shetty. It was placed into its own genus as Paradalzellia tirunelveliana in 2022.
