= Cipoia =

Scientific classification
- Kingdom: Plantae
- Clade: Tracheophytes
- Clade: Angiosperms
- Clade: Eudicots
- Clade: Rosids
- Order: Malpighiales
- Family: Podostemaceae
- Genus: Cipoia; C.T.Philbrick, Novelo & Irgang

Genus of flowering plants

Cipoia is a genus of flowering plants belonging to the family Podostemaceae.

Its native range is Southeastern Brazil.

== Species ==
- Cipoia inserta C.T.Philbrick, Novelo & Irgang
- Cipoia ramosa C.P.Bove, C.T.Philbrick & Novelo
