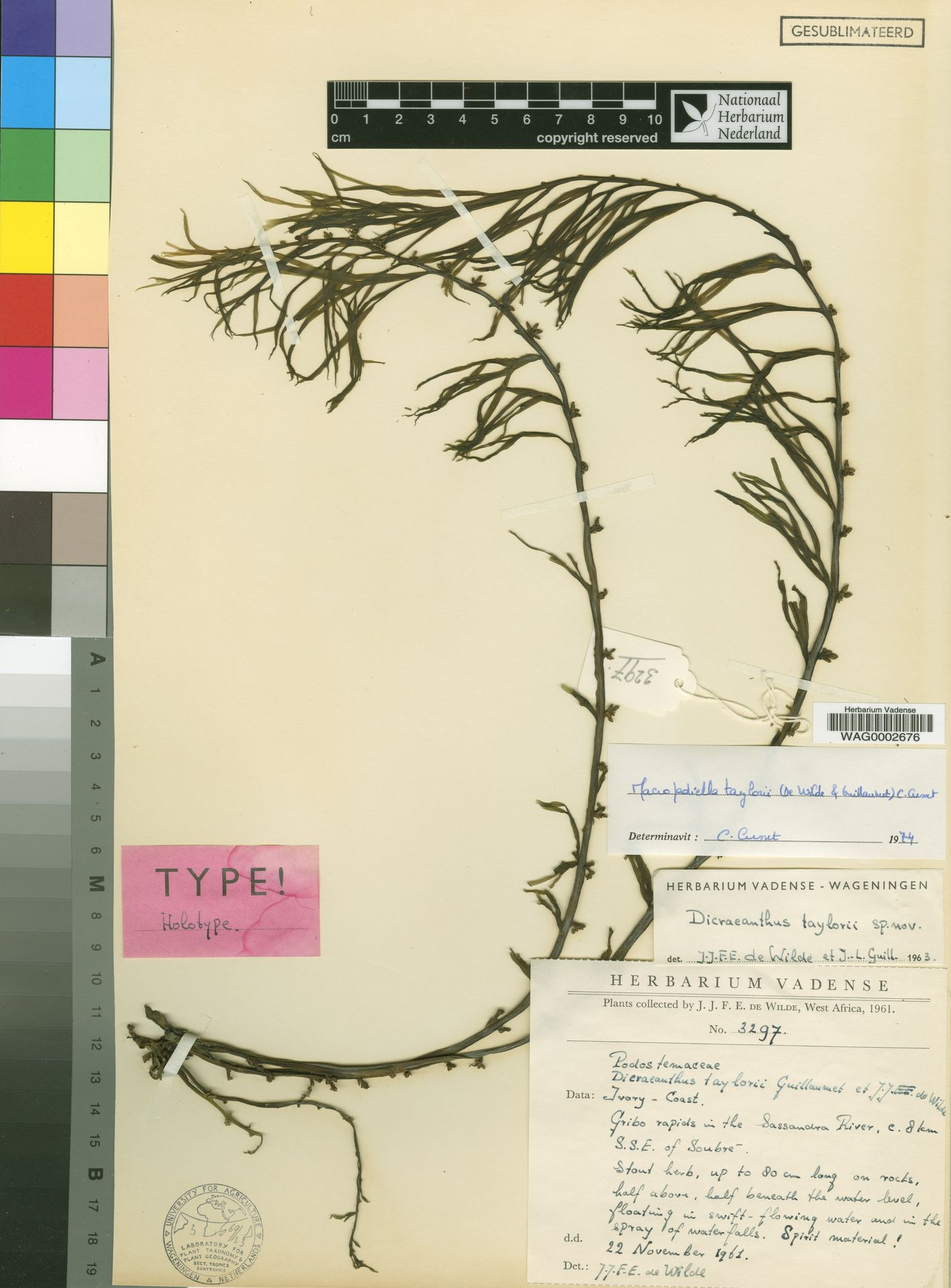

Scientific classification
- Kingdom: Plantae
- Clade: Tracheophytes
- Clade: Angiosperms
- Clade: Eudicots
- Clade: Rosids
- Order: Malpighiales
- Family: Podostemaceae
- Genus: Macropodiella; Engl. (1926)

Species
- 7; see text

= Macropodiella =

Genus of flowering plants

Macropodiella is a genus of flowering plants in the family Podostemaceae. It includes seven species native to west and west-central Africa, ranging from Guinea to Ivory Coast, and from Cameroon to Gabon.

These are aquatic herbs found in freshwater. The leaves are linear, threadlike, or scale-like. The flowers are solitary or in clusters, and each has two tepals.

== Species ==
Seven species are accepted.

- Macropodiella garrettii (C.H.Wright) C.Cusset
- Macropodiella hallaei C.Cusset
- Macropodiella heteromorpha (Baill.) C.Cusset
- Macropodiella macrothyrsa (G.Taylor) C.Cusset
- Macropodiella pellucida (Engl.) C.Cusset
- Macropodiella taylorii (J.J.de Wilde & Guillaumet) C.Cusset
- Macropodiella uoroensis Rial
