= Winklerella =

Conservation status
- Critically Endangered (IUCN 3.1)

Scientific classification
- Kingdom: Plantae
- Clade: Tracheophytes
- Clade: Angiosperms
- Clade: Eudicots
- Clade: Rosids
- Order: Malpighiales
- Family: Podostemaceae
- Genus: Winklerella; Engl.
- Species: W. dichotoma

Binomial name
- Winklerella dichotoma Engl.

Species of flowering plant

Winklerella is a monotypic genus of flowering plants belonging to the family Podostemaceae. It only contains one known species, Winklerella dichotoma.

It is native to Cameroon in Africa.

The genus name of Winklerella is in honour of Hubert Winkler (1875–1941), a German botanist, who specialized in tropical flora research. The Latin specific epithet of dichotoma is derived from dichotomus which means split in two; from dichotomous. Both the genus and the species were first described and published in Bot. Jahrb. Syst. Vol.38 on page 97 in 1905.
