= Ledermanniella =

Scientific classification
- Kingdom: Plantae
- Clade: Tracheophytes
- Clade: Angiosperms
- Clade: Eudicots
- Clade: Rosids
- Order: Malpighiales
- Family: Podostemaceae
- Genus: Ledermanniella; Engl. (1909)

Species
- 28; see text

Synonyms
- Monandriella Engl. (1926)

Genus of flowering plants

Ledermanniella is a genus of flowering plants in the family Podostemaceae. It includes 28 species all native to tropical Africa.

The genus name of Ledermanniella is in honour of Carl Ludwig Ledermann (1875-1958), who was a Swiss botanist and horticultural expert.

The genus was circumscribed by Heinrich Gustav Adolf Engler in Bot. Jahrb. Syst. vol.43 (Issue 4) on page 378 in 1909.

== Species ==
28 species are accepted.

- Ledermanniella aloides (Engl.) C.Cusset
- Ledermanniella batangensis (Engl.) C.Cusset
- Ledermanniella bifurcata (Engl.) C.Cusset
- Ledermanniella boloensis C.Cusset
- Ledermanniella bowlingii (J.B.Hall) C.Cusset
- Ledermanniella guineensis C.Cusset
- Ledermanniella jaegeri C.Cusset
- Ledermanniella keayi (G.Taylor) C.Cusset
- Ledermanniella letestui (Pellegr.) C.Cusset
- Ledermanniella letouzeyi C.Cusset
- Ledermanniella linearifolia Engl.
- Ledermanniella lunda Cheek
- Ledermanniella maturiniana Beentje
- Ledermanniella minutissima C.Cusset
- Ledermanniella monandra C.Cusset
- Ledermanniella musciformis (G.Taylor) C.Cusset
- Ledermanniella onanae Cheek
- Ledermanniella pollardiana Cheek & Ameka
- Ledermanniella prasina J.J.Schenk & D.W.Thomas
- Ledermanniella pusilla (Warm.) C.Cusset
- Ledermanniella ramosissima Hauman ex C.Cusset
- Ledermanniella raynaliorum C.Cusset
- Ledermanniella sanagaensis C.Cusset
- Ledermanniella schlechteri (Engl.) C.Cusset
- Ledermanniella tenuifolia (G.Taylor) C.Cusset
- Ledermanniella thalloidea (Engl.) C.Cusset
- Ledermanniella variabilis (G.Taylor) C.Cusset
- Ledermanniella yiben Cheek
