= Thelethylax =

Scientific classification
- Kingdom: Plantae
- Clade: Tracheophytes
- Clade: Angiosperms
- Clade: Eudicots
- Clade: Rosids
- Order: Malpighiales
- Family: Podostemaceae
- Genus: Thelethylax; C.Cusset

Genus of flowering plants

Thelethylax is a genus of flowering plants belonging to the family Podostemaceae.

Its native range is Madagascar.

Species:

- Thelethylax insolata (H.Perrier) Jäger-Zürn
- Thelethylax isalensis (H.Perrier) C.Cusset
- Thelethylax minutiflora (Tul.) C.Cusset
