= Thawatchaia =

Scientific classification
- Kingdom: Plantae
- Clade: Tracheophytes
- Clade: Angiosperms
- Clade: Eudicots
- Clade: Rosids
- Order: Malpighiales
- Family: Podostemaceae
- Genus: Thawatchaia; M.Kato, Koi & Y.Kita

Genus of flowering plants

Thawatchaia is a genus of flowering plants belonging to the family Podostemaceae.

The genus name of Thawatchaia is in honour of Thawatchai Santisuk (b. 1944), a Thai herbarium director in Bangkok, and also, Thawatchai Wongprasert (fl. 2000), a plant collector. It was first described and published in Acta Phytotax. Geobot. Vol.55 on page 66 in 2004.

It is native range to Thailand and Laos.

== Known species ==
Accepted by Kew:

- Thawatchaia laotica Koi & M.Kato
- Thawatchaia trilobata M.Kato, Koi & Y.Kita
