= Pohliella =

Scientific classification
- Kingdom: Plantae
- Clade: Tracheophytes
- Clade: Angiosperms
- Clade: Eudicots
- Clade: Rosids
- Order: Malpighiales
- Family: Podostemaceae
- Genus: Pohliella; Engl. (1926)

Species
- Pohliella amicorum (J.B.Hall) Cheek; Pohliella laciniata Engl.

Genus of flowering plants

Pohliella is a genus of flowering plants in the family Podostemaceae. It includes two species native to western and west-central tropical Africa.

- Pohliella amicorum (J.B.Hall) Cheek – Ivory Coast and Ghana
- Pohliella laciniata Engl. – Cameroon
