= Ctenobryum =

Scientific classification
- Kingdom: Plantae
- Clade: Tracheophytes
- Clade: Angiosperms
- Clade: Eudicots
- Clade: Rosids
- Order: Malpighiales
- Family: Podostemaceae
- Genus: Ctenobryum; Koi & M.Kato (2019)
- Species: C. mangkonense

Binomial name
- Ctenobryum mangkonense Koi & M.Kato (2019)

Genus of flowering plants

Ctenobryum makongense is a species of flowering plant belonging to the family Podostemaceae. It is the sole species in genus Ctenobryum. It is endemic to Laos.
