= Dicraeanthus =

Scientific classification
- Kingdom: Plantae
- Clade: Tracheophytes
- Clade: Angiosperms
- Clade: Eudicots
- Clade: Rosids
- Order: Malpighiales
- Family: Podostemaceae
- Genus: Dicraeanthus; Engl.

Genus of plants

Dicraeanthus is a genus of flowering plants belonging to the family Podostemaceae.

Its native range is Western and Western Central Tropical Africa.

Species:

- Dicraeanthus africanus Engl.
- Dicraeanthus ramosus H.Hess
- Dicraeanthus zehnderi H.Hess
