= Saxicolella =

Scientific classification
- Kingdom: Plantae
- Clade: Tracheophytes
- Clade: Angiosperms
- Clade: Eudicots
- Clade: Rosids
- Order: Malpighiales
- Family: Podostemaceae
- Genus: Saxicolella; Engl. (1926)

Species
- 8; see text

Synonyms
- Butumia G.Taylor (1953)

Genus of plants

Saxicolella is a genus of flowering plant in family Podostemaceae. It includes eight species native to west and west-central tropical Africa, ranging from Guinea to Angola.

== Species ==
Eight species are accepted.

- Saxicolella angola Cheek
- Saxicolella deniseae Cheek
- Saxicolella flabellata (G.Taylor) C.Cusset
- Saxicolella futa Cheek
- Saxicolella ijim Cheek
- Saxicolella marginalis (G. Taylor) C.Cusset ex Cheek
- Saxicolella nana Engl.
- Saxicolella submersa (J.B.Hall) C.D.K.Cook & Rutish.

== Etymology ==
Saxicolella comes from the Latin "saxum", meaning "a rock" or "stone", and "-cola", meaning "inhabitant" or "resident".
