= Diamantina lombardii =

Scientific classification
- Kingdom: Plantae
- Clade: Tracheophytes
- Clade: Angiosperms
- Clade: Eudicots
- Clade: Rosids
- Order: Malpighiales
- Family: Podostemaceae
- Genus: Diamantina; Novelo & C.T.Philbrick & Irgang
- Species: D. lombardii

Binomial name
- Diamantina lombardii Novelo, C.T.Philbrick & Irgang

Species of flowering plant

Diamantina lombardii is a species of flowering plant in the Podostemaceae and the only known member of the genus Diamantina. It was described in 2004.
