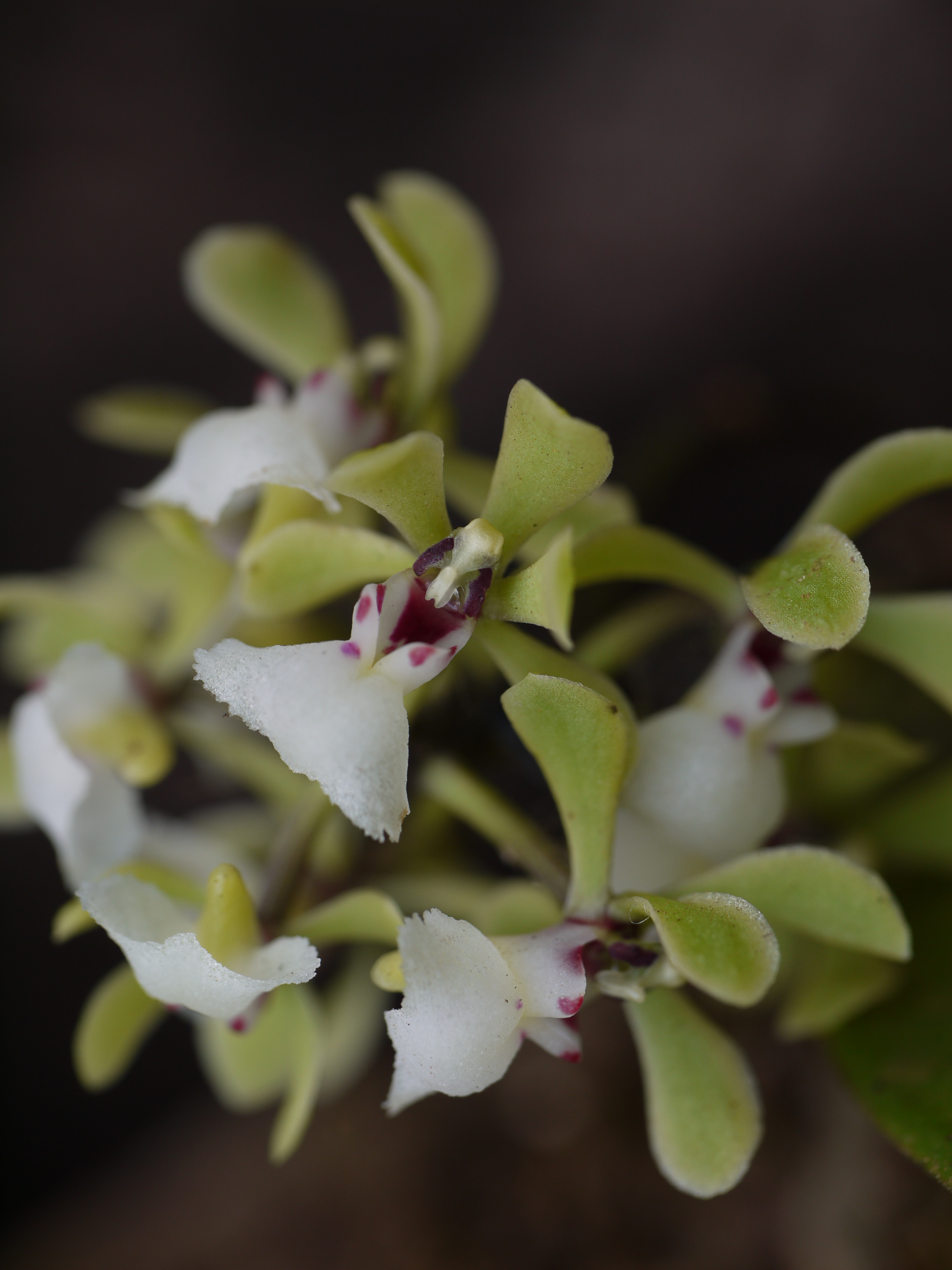
- Smithsonia viridiflora

Scientific classification
- Kingdom: Plantae
- Clade: Tracheophytes
- Clade: Angiosperms
- Clade: Monocots
- Order: Asparagales
- Family: Orchidaceae
- Subfamily: Epidendroideae
- Tribe: Vandeae
- Subtribe: Aeridinae
- Genus: Smithsonia; C.J.Saldanha

Synonyms
- Micropera Dalzell 1851, illegitimate homonym, not Lindl. 1832; Loxoma Garay 1972, illegitimate homonym, not R. Br. ex A. Cunn. 1837; Loxomorchis Rauschert

= Smithsonia =

Genus of orchids

Smithsonia is a genus of flowering plants from the orchid family, Orchidaceae. It contains three known species, all endemic to southern India.

- Smithsonia maculata (Dalzell) C.J.Saldanha - Kanara
- Smithsonia straminea C.J.Saldanha - southern India
- Smithsonia viridiflora (Dalzell) C.J.Saldanha - southern India

== See also ==
- List of Orchidaceae genera
