= Colette Cusset =

French botanist and botanical collector (1944 - )

Colette Cusset, born on 28 June 1944, is a French researcher and botanist. She specializes particularly in Podostemaceae found on the African continent, discovering and cataloging several species.

Her contributions to African botany led scientists to name a species of Podostemaceae in her honor in 2016.

== Biography ==
She was born in 1944. She obtained her doctorate at the end of her studies. In 1969, she was appointed as a research assistant at the National Museum of Natural History. Later, within this institution, Cusset was the first to digitize botanical data from the regions covered by her research, between 1985 and 1988.

She is partly known for having described two new genera of Podostemaceae, "Djinga" and "Zehnderia", and 18 new species, in addition to renaming 35 others. Her choices in reorganization and renaming subsequently opened new avenues for research.

== Legacy ==
Some of her work was described as "foundational" by other scientists. In 2016, a species of Podostemaceae from Ivory Coast was named in her honor by Ghanaian and British botanists Gabriel Ameka and Martin Cheek, "Macropodiella cussetiana".
