= Autana andersonii =

Scientific classification
- Kingdom: Plantae
- Clade: Tracheophytes
- Clade: Angiosperms
- Clade: Eudicots
- Clade: Rosids
- Order: Malpighiales
- Family: Podostemaceae
- Genus: Autana; C.T.Philbrick (2011)
- Species: A. andersonii

Binomial name
- Autana andersonii C.T.Philbrick (2011)

Species of flowering plant

Autana andersonii is a species of flowering plant in the family Podostemaceae. It is the sole species in genus Autana. It is an aquatic subshrub endemic to Venezuela.
