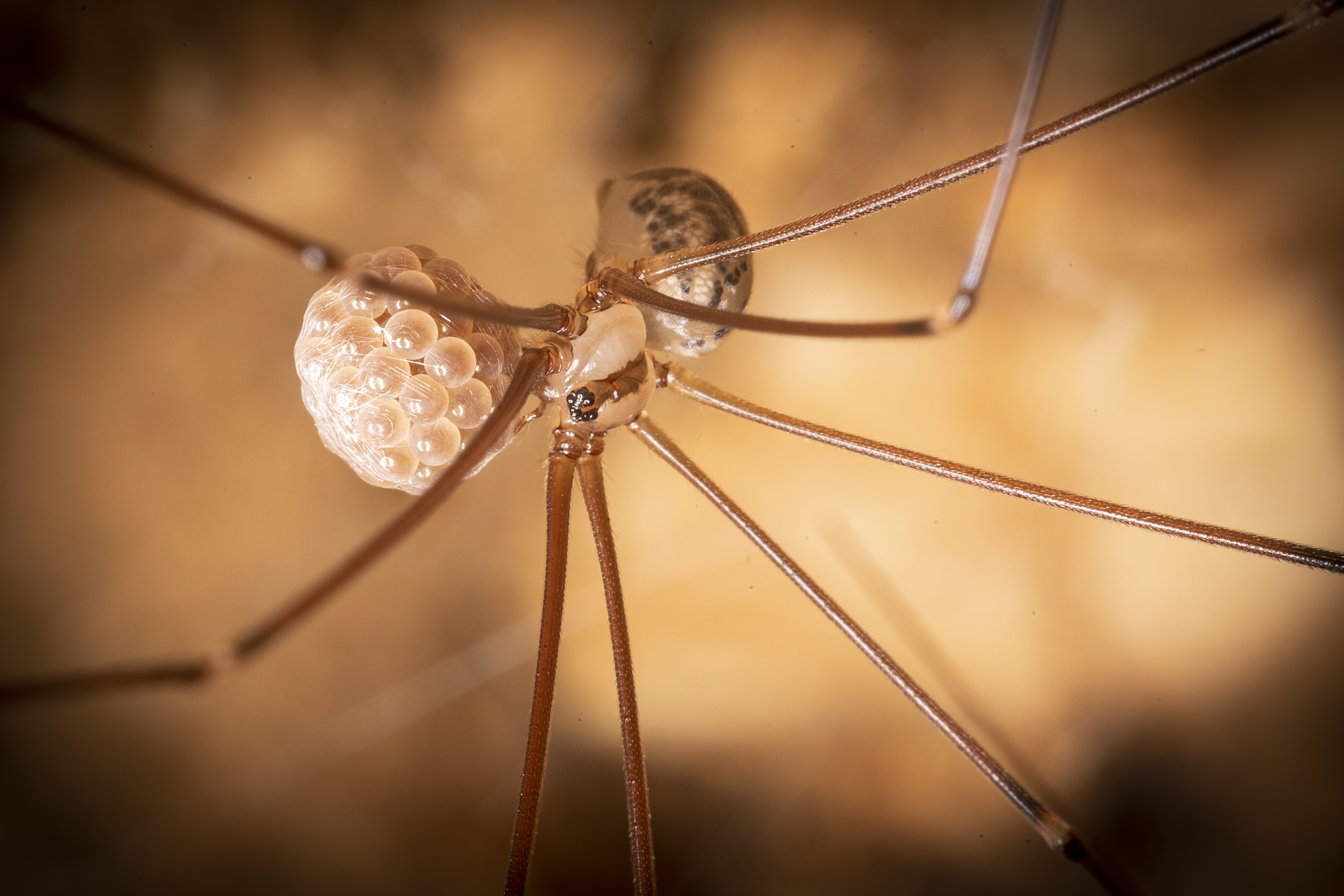
- Mesabolivar sp. female with eggsac
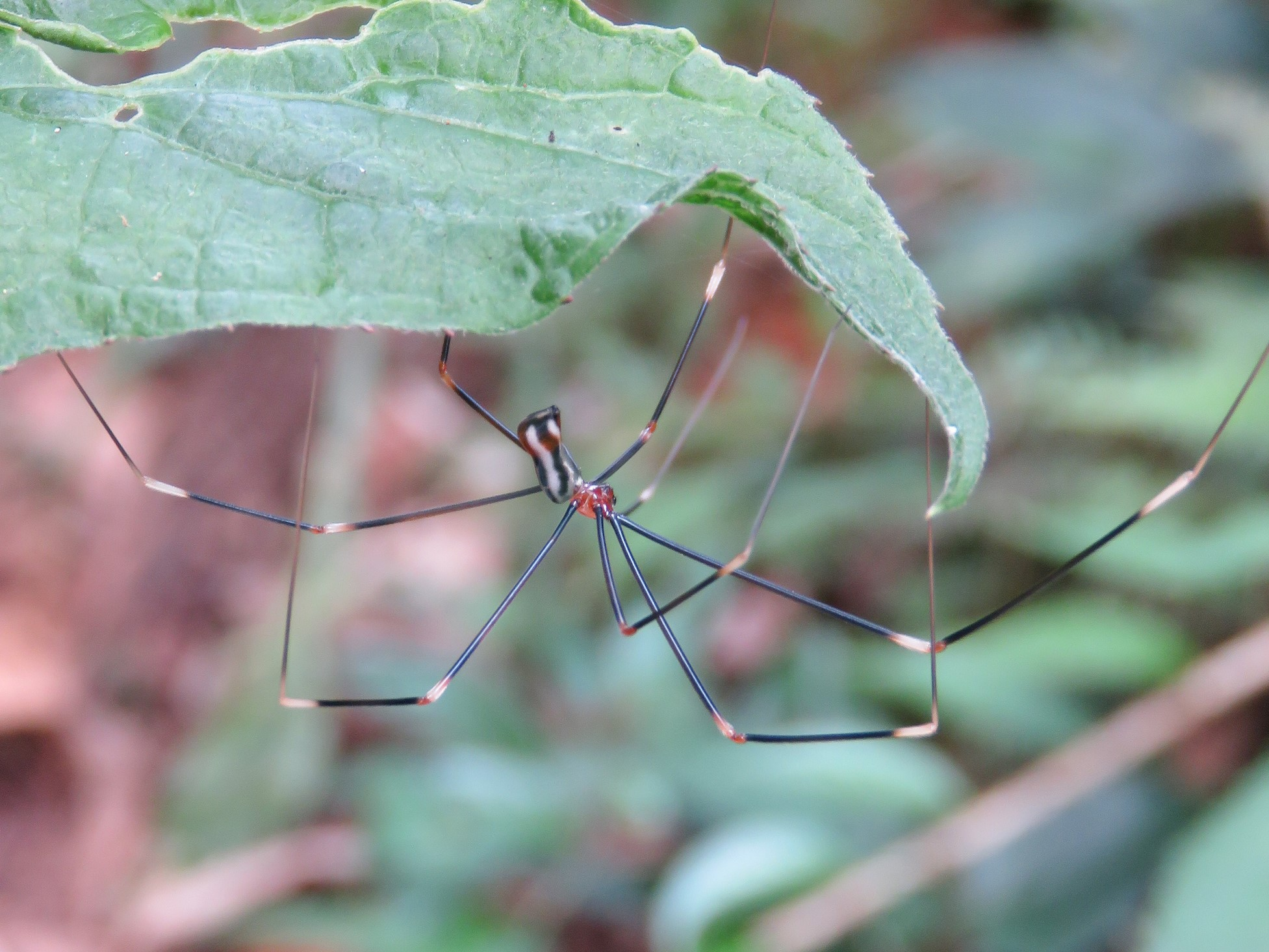
- Mesabolivar brasiliensis under a leaf

Scientific classification
- Kingdom: Animalia
- Phylum: Arthropoda
- Subphylum: Chelicerata
- Class: Arachnida
- Order: Araneae
- Infraorder: Araneomorphae
- Family: Pholcidae
- Genus: Mesabolivar; González-Sponga, 1998

Type species
- M. pseudoblechroscelis González-Sponga, 1998

Species
- 94, see text

Synonyms
- Autana González-Sponga, 2011; Caruaya González-Sponga, 2011; Kaliana Huber, 2000; Rioparaguanus González-Sponga, 2005; Teuia Huber, 2000

= Mesabolivar =

Genus of spiders

Mesabolivar is a genus of cellar spiders that was first described by M. A. González-Sponga in 1998.

== Species ==
As of June 2019 it contains ninety-four species, found only in South America and on Trinidad:

- M. acrensis Huber, 2018 – Brazil
- M. amadoi Huber, 2018 – Brazil
- M. amanaye Huber, 2018 – Brazil
- M. amazonicus Huber, 2018 – Brazil
- M. anseriformis (González-Sponga, 2011) – Venezuela
- M. argentinensis (Mello-Leitão, 1938) – Argentina
- M. aurantiacus (Mello-Leitão, 1930) – Northern South America
- M. azureus (Badcock, 1932) – Brazil
- M. baianus Huber, 2018 – Brazil
- M. banksi (Moenkhaus, 1898) – Brazil
- M. beckeri (Huber, 2000) – Brazil
- M. bico Huber, 2018 – Brazil
- M. bicuspis Huber, 2018 – Brazil
- M. bonita Huber, 2015 – Brazil
- M. borgesi Huber, 2018 – Argentina
- M. botocudo Huber, 2000 – Brazil
- M. brasiliensis (Moenkhaus, 1898) – Brazil
- M. buraquinho Huber, 2018 – Brazil
- M. caipora Huber, 2015 – Brazil
- M. camacan Huber, 2018 – Brazil
- M. camussi Machado, Yamamoto, Brescovit & Huber, 2007 – Brazil
- M. cantharus Machado, Yamamoto, Brescovit & Huber, 2007 – Brazil
- M. catarinensis Huber, 2018 – Brazil
- M. cavicelatus Machado, Brescovit, Candiani & Huber, 2007 – Brazil
- M. ceruleiventris (Mello-Leitão, 1916) – Brazil
- M. chapeco Huber, 2018 – Brazil, Argentina
- M. charrua Machado, Laborda, Simó & Brescovit, 2013 – Brazil, Uruguay
- M. claricae Huber, 2018 – Brazil
- M. constrictus Huber, 2018 – Brazil
- M. cuarassu Huber, Brescovit & Rheims, 2005 – Brazil
- M. cyaneomaculatus (Keyserling, 1891) – Brazil
- M. cyaneotaeniatus (Keyserling, 1891) – Brazil
- M. cyaneus (Taczanowski, 1874) – Venezuela, French Guiana, Guyana, Brazil
- M. delclaroi Machado & Brescovit, 2012 – Brazil
- M. difficilis (Mello-Leitão, 1918) – Brazil
- M. eberhardi Huber, 2000 – Trinidad, Colombia, Venezuela, Peru, Brazil
- M. embapua Machado, Brescovit & Francisco, 2007 – Brazil
- M. exlineae (Mello-Leitão, 1947) – Peru
- M. forceps Machado, Brescovit, Candiani & Huber, 2007 – Brazil
- M. gabettae Huber, 2015 – Brazil
- M. giupponii Huber, 2015 – Brazil
- M. globulosus (Nicolet, 1849) – Chile, Argentina
- M. goitaca Huber, 2015 – Brazil
- M. guapiara Huber, 2000 – Brazil
- M. guaycolec Huber, 2018 – Argentina
- M. huambisa Huber, 2000 – Peru, Ecuador
- M. huanuco Huber, 2000 – Peru
- M. huberi Machado, Brescovit & Francisco, 2007 – Brazil
- M. iguazu Huber, 2000 – Brazil, Argentina
- M. inmanis Huber, 2018 – Brazil
- M. inornatus Huber, 2015 – Brazil
- M. itajai Huber, 2018 – Brazil
- M. itapoa Huber, 2015 – Brazil
- M. jamari Huber, 2018 – Brazil
- M. junin Huber, 2000 – Peru
- M. kaingang Huber, 2018 – Brazil
- M. kathrinae Huber, 2015 – Brazil
- M. locono Huber, 2000 – Suriname, Guyana
- M. macushi Huber, 2018 – Venezuela
- M. madalena Huber, 2018 – Brazil
- M. mairyara Machado, Brescovit, Candiani & Huber, 2007 – Brazil
- M. maraba Huber, 2018 – Brazil
- M. maxacali Huber, 2000 – Brazil
- M. mimoso Huber, 2018 – Brazil
- M. monteverde Huber, 2015 – Brazil
- M. murici Huber, 2018 – Brazil
- M. nigridentis (Mello-Leitão, 1922) – Brazil
- M. niteroi Huber, 2018 – Brazil
- M. pallens Huber, 2018 – Brazil
- M. paraensis (Mello-Leitão, 1947) – Brazil
- M. pau Huber, 2015 – Brazil
- M. perezi Huber, 2015 – Brazil
- M. pseudoblechroscelis González-Sponga, 1998 (type) – Venezuela
- M. rudilapsi Machado, Brescovit & Francisco, 2007 – Brazil
- M. saci Huber, 2018 – Brazil
- M. sai Huber, 2015 – Brazil
- M. samatiaguassu Huber, Brescovit & Rheims, 2005 – Brazil
- M. sepitus Huber, 2018 – Brazil
- M. serrapelada Huber, 2018 – Brazil
- M. similis Huber, 2018 – Brazil
- M. simoni (Moenkhaus, 1898) – Brazil
- M. spinosus (González-Sponga, 2005) – Venezuela
- M. spinulosus (Mello-Leitão, 1939) – Brazil
- M. tabatinga Huber, 2018 – Peru, Brazil
- M. tamoio Huber, 2015 – Brazil
- M. tandilicus (Mello-Leitão, 1940) – Uruguay, Argentina
- M. tapajos Huber, 2018 – Brazil
- M. togatus (Keyserling, 1891) – Brazil
- M. turvo Huber, 2018 – Brazil
- M. unicornis Huber, 2015 – Brazil
- M. uruguayensis Machado, Laborda, Simó & Brescovit, 2013 – Brazil, Uruguay, Argentina
- M. xingu Huber, 2000 – Brazil
- M. yucuma Huber, 2018 – Brazil
- M. yuruani (Huber, 2000) – Venezuela

== See also ==
- List of Pholcidae species
