= Indodalzellia =

Scientific classification
- Kingdom: Plantae
- Clade: Tracheophytes
- Clade: Angiosperms
- Clade: Eudicots
- Clade: Rosids
- Order: Malpighiales
- Family: Podostemaceae
- Genus: Indodalzellia; Koi & M.Kato (2009)
- Species: I. gracilis

Binomial name
- Indodalzellia gracilis (C.J.Mathew, Jäger-Zürn & Nileena) Koi & M.Kato (2009)

Synonyms
- Dalzellia gracilis C.J.Mathew, Jäger-Zürn & Nileena (2001)

Genus of flowering plants

Indodalzellia gracilis is a species of flowering plant in the family Podostemaceae. It is the sole species in genus Indodalzellia. It is an aquatic subshrub native to Kerala state in southwestern India.

It was first described as Dalzellia gracilis in 2001. In 2009 it was placed in its own genus as Indodalzellia gracilis.
