= Torrenticola (mite) =

Scientific classification
- Domain: Eukaryota
- Kingdom: Animalia
- Phylum: Arthropoda
- Subphylum: Chelicerata
- Class: Arachnida
- Order: Trombidiformes
- Family: Torrenticolidae
- Genus: Torrenticola; Piersig, 1896

Genus of arachnids

Torrenticola is a genus of arachnids belonging to the family Torrenticolidae.

The genus has cosmopolitan distribution.

Species:

- Torrenticola acuticoxalis Viets
- Torrenticola affinis (Lundblad, 1941)
