= Leiothylax =

Scientific classification
- Kingdom: Plantae
- Clade: Tracheophytes
- Clade: Angiosperms
- Clade: Eudicots
- Clade: Rosids
- Order: Malpighiales
- Family: Podostemaceae
- Genus: Leiothylax; Warm. (1899)

Synonyms
- Leiocarpodicraea Engl. (1905)

Genus of plants

Leiothylax is a genus of flowering plants belonging to the family Podostemaceae.

Its native range is Cameroon to Tanzania and Angola.

Species:

- Leiothylax callewaertii G.Taylor ex C.Cusset
- Leiothylax drummondii C.Cusset
- Leiothylax quangensis (Engl.) Warm.
- Leiothylax warmingii (Engl.) Warm.
