= Paradalzellia =

Conservation status
- Near Threatened (IUCN 3.1)

Scientific classification
- Kingdom: Plantae
- Clade: Tracheophytes
- Clade: Angiosperms
- Clade: Eudicots
- Clade: Rosids
- Order: Malpighiales
- Family: Podostemaceae
- Genus: Paradalzellia; Koi, P.L.Uniyal & M.Kato (2022)
- Species: P. tirunelveliana

Binomial name
- Paradalzellia tirunelveliana (B.D.Sharma, Karthik. & B.V.Shetty) Koi, P.L.Uniyal & M.Kato (2022)

Synonyms
- Indotristicha tirunelveliana B.D.Sharma, Karthik. & B.V.Shetty (1974 publ. 1977)

Genus of flowering plants

Paradalzellia tirunelveliana is a species of flowering plant in the family Podostemaceae. It is the sole species in genus Paradalzellia. It is an aquatic perennial endemic to Tamil Nadu state in southern India.

The species is known from a single location in Kalakkad Mundanthurai Tiger Reserve in the Western Ghats range, in Thulukkanparai, Tirukkurungudi, Tirunelveli district, Tamil Nadu.

The species was first described as Indotristicha tirunelveliana in 1977. In 2022 it was placed in its own genus as Paradalzellia tirunelveliana.
