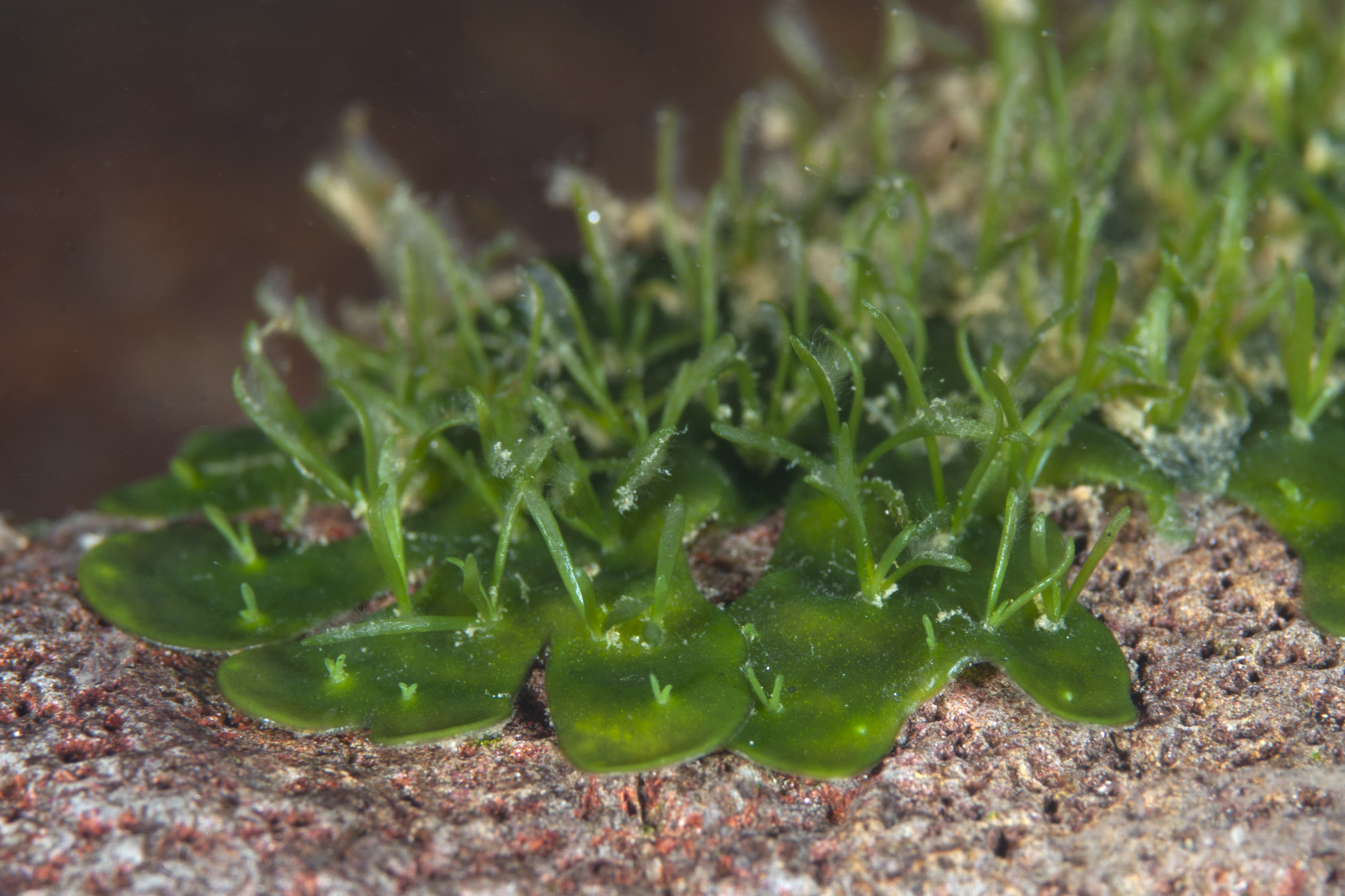
- Hydrobryum puncticulatum

Scientific classification
- Kingdom: Plantae
- Clade: Tracheophytes
- Clade: Angiosperms
- Clade: Eudicots
- Clade: Rosids
- Order: Malpighiales
- Family: Podostemaceae
- Genus: Hydrobryum; Endl. (1841)

Species
- 33; see text

Synonyms
- Diplobryum C.Cusset (1972); Euhydrobryum (Tul.) Koidz. (1931); Hydroanzia Koidz. (1935), nom. superfl.; Synstylis C.Cusset (1992)

= Hydrobryum =

Genus of plants

Hydrobryum is a genus of flowering plants belonging to the family Podostemaceae. It includes 33 species native to subtropical and tropical Asia, ranging from Nepal through the eastern Himalayas, Indo-China, and southern China to Japan.

== Species ==
33 species are accepted.

- Hydrobryum austrolaoticum Koi & M.Kato
- Hydrobryum bifoliatum C.Cusset
- Hydrobryum chiangmaiense Mak.Kato
- Hydrobryum chompuense Werukamkul, Ampornpan, M.Kato & Koi
- Hydrobryum clandestinum Koi & M.Kato
- Hydrobryum floribundum Koidz.
- Hydrobryum griffithii (Wall. ex Griff.) Tul.
- Hydrobryum hapteron Koi & M.Kato
- Hydrobryum japonicum Imamura
- Hydrobryum kaengsophense Mak.Kato
- Hydrobryum khaoyaiense Mak.Kato
- Hydrobryum koribanum Imamura ex Nakay. & Minamit.
- Hydrobryum loeicum Mak.Kato
- Hydrobryum luangnamtaense Koi & M.Kato
- Hydrobryum mandaengense Ampornpan, Werukamkul, M.Kato & Koi
- Hydrobryum micrantherum (P.Royen) C.D.K.Cook & Rutish.
- Hydrobryum minutale (C.Cusset) Koi & M.Kato
- Hydrobryum nakaiense Koi & M.Kato
- Hydrobryum phetchabunense M.Kato & Koi
- Hydrobryum phurueanum Werukamkul, Ampornpan, Koi & M.Kato
- Hydrobryum puncticulatum (Koidz.) M.Kato
- Hydrobryum ramosum (C.Cusset) Koi & M.Kato
- Hydrobryum somranii Mak.Kato
- Hydrobryum stellatum Koi & M.Kato
- Hydrobryum subcrustaceum Koi & M.Kato
- Hydrobryum subcylindricoides Koi & M.Kato
- Hydrobryum subcylindricum Koi & M.Kato
- Hydrobryum taeniatum Koi & M.Kato
- Hydrobryum takakioides Koi & M.Kato
- Hydrobryum tardhuangense Mak.Kato
- Hydrobryum varium Ampornpan, Werukamkul, Koi & M.Kato
- Hydrobryum verrucosum Koi & M.Kato
- Hydrobryum vientianense (M.Kato & Fukuoka) Koi & M.Kato
