= Hanseniella (plant) =

Scientific classification
- Kingdom: Plantae
- Clade: Tracheophytes
- Clade: Angiosperms
- Clade: Eudicots
- Clade: Rosids
- Order: Malpighiales
- Family: Podostemaceae
- Genus: Hanseniella; C.Cusset

Genus of plants

Hanseniella is a genus of flowering plants belonging to the family Podostemaceae.

Its native range is Thailand.

Species:

- Hanseniella heterophylla C.Cusset
- Hanseniella smitinandii Mak.Kato

The genus is named after Mr. Hansen who collected plants in Thailand. It was first described and published in Bull. Mus. Natl. Hist. Nat., B, Adansonia Vol.14 on page 36 in 1992.
