= Laosia ramosa =

Scientific classification
- Kingdom: Plantae
- Clade: Tracheophytes
- Clade: Angiosperms
- Clade: Eudicots
- Clade: Rosids
- Order: Malpighiales
- Family: Podostemaceae
- Genus: Laosia; Koi, Won & M.Kato (2019)
- Species: L. ramosa

Binomial name
- Laosia ramosa Koi, Won & M.Kato (2019)

Genus of plants

Laosia ramosa is a species of flowering plant belonging to the family Podostemaceae. It is the sole species in genus Laosia. It is endemic to Laos.
