= Nicol Alexander Dalzell =

Scottish botanist

FRSE Nicol Alexander Dalzell
- Born: 21 April 1817
- Died: 18 December 1877 (aged 60)
- Education: University of Edinburgh
- Scientific career
- Fields: Botany
- Author abbrev. (botany): Dalzell

Nicol (or Nicholas) Alexander Dalzell FRSE FLS (21 April 1817 – 18 December 1877) was a Scottish botanist. He was one of the first people to form the link between forest denudation and the impact of rainfall upon the wider countryside.

== Life ==
Born in Edinburgh, Scotland, his early education was at the High School in Edinburgh.

Dalzell studied divinity (rather than botany) at university, under Rev Thomas Chalmers, and received an M.A. at the University of Edinburgh in 1837. He served as the assistant commissioner of customs, salt and opium in Bombay, India in 1841. In 1862 he became conservator of forests in Bombay and superintendent of the Botanical Gardens in the Bombay Presidency. He published The Bombay Flora (1861), and other works on Indian botany, and retired in 1870.

In 1862 he was elected a fellow of the Royal Society of Edinburgh his proposer being John Hutton Balfour. He lost his savings in the collapse of the Bank of Hindostan, China, and Japan.

He retired in 1870 due to the ongoing effects of malaria and returned to Scotland.

He died at home in Williamfield House, Portobello, Edinburgh on 18 December 1877, leaving a widow (Emily Harriet Duthy) and six children, including Pulteney William Dalzell.

== Legacy ==
A number of plant species are named for him, such as the grass, Ischaemum dalzelli.

Also a genus of flowering plants, Dalzellia from China, was also named after him, in 1852.

== See also ==
- Category:Taxa named by Nicol Alexander Dalzell

== Bibliography ==
The standard author abbreviation Dalzell is used to indicate this person as the author when citing a botanical name.

- Nicol Alexander Dalzell; Alexander Gibson (1861). The Bombay Flora: Or, Short Descriptions of All the Indigenous Plants Hitherto Discovered in Or Near the Bombay Presidency : Together with a Supplement of Introduced and Naturalised Species. Education Society's Press.

== Sources ==
- This article incorporates text from a publication now in the public domain: "Dalzell, Nicol Alexander". Dictionary of National Biography. London: Smith, Elder & Co. 1885–1900.
