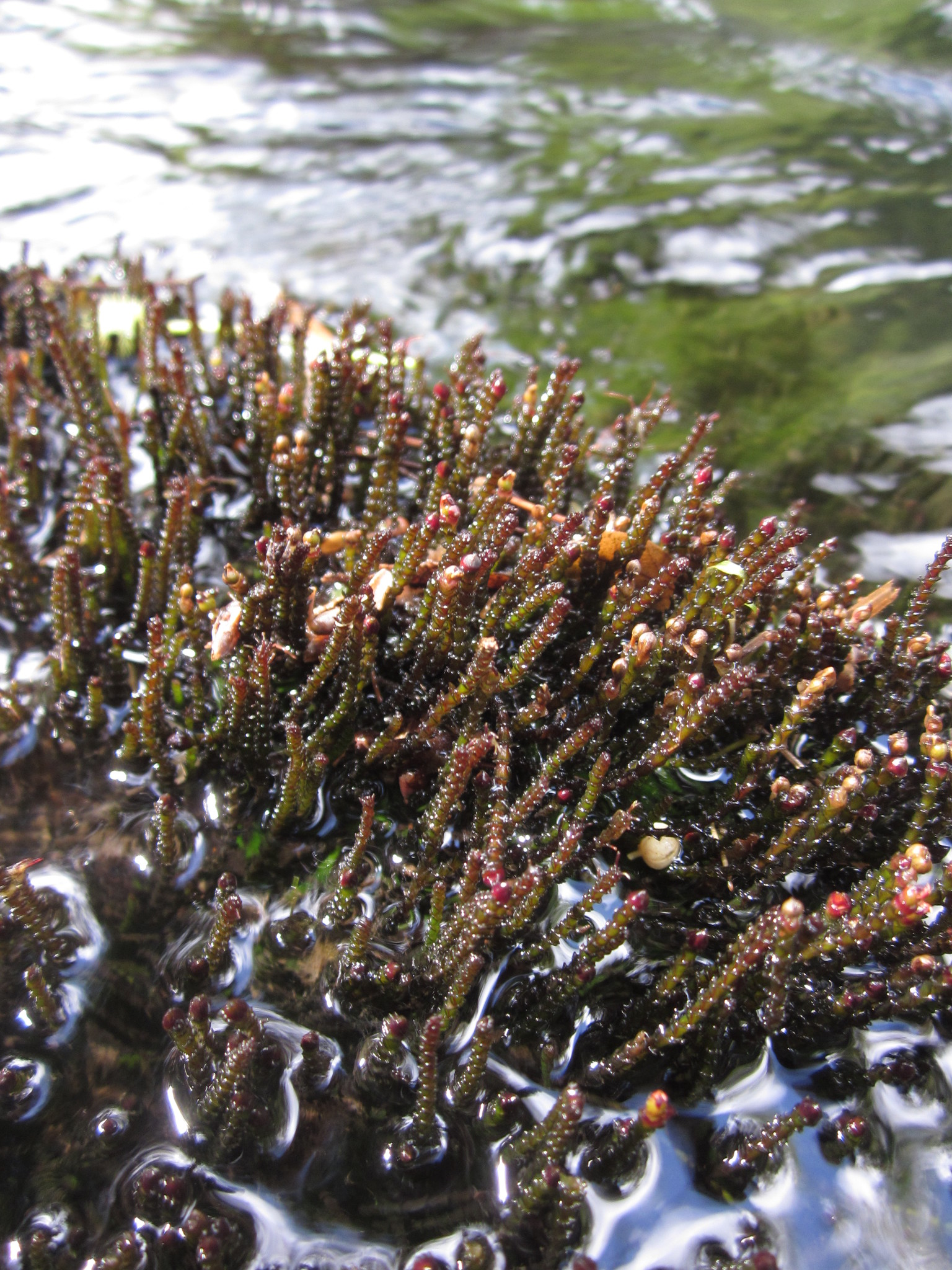
- Cladopus queenslandicus

Scientific classification
- Kingdom: Plantae
- Clade: Tracheophytes
- Clade: Angiosperms
- Clade: Eudicots
- Clade: Rosids
- Order: Malpighiales
- Family: Podostemaceae
- Genus: Cladopus; H.Möller (1899)

Synonyms
- Griffithella (Tul.) Warm. (1901); Hemidistichophyllum Koidz. (1928); Lawiella Koidz. (1928); Lecomtea Koidz. (1929); Torrenticola Domin (1925)

= Cladopus =

Genus of flowering plants

Cladopus is a genus of flowering plants belonging to the family Podostemaceae.

Its native range is from tropical and subtropical Asia to northern Queensland.

== Species ==
11 species are accepted.

- Cladopus austrosinensis Mak.Kato & Y.Kita
- Cladopus doianus (Koidz.) Kôriba
- Cladopus fallax C.Cusset
- Cladopus fukienensis (H.C.Chao) H.C.Chao
- Cladopus hookeriana (Tul.) C.Cusset
- Cladopus javanicus M.Kato & Hambali
- Cladopus nymanii H.Möller
- Cladopus pierrei (Lecomte) C.Cusset
- Cladopus queenslandicus (Domin) C.D.K.Cook & Rutish.
- Cladopus taiensis C.Cusset
- Cladopus yinggelingensis Q.W.Lin, Gang Lu & Z.Y.Li
