= Hugh Algernon Weddell =

Anglo-French botanist, physician and explorer (1819–1877)

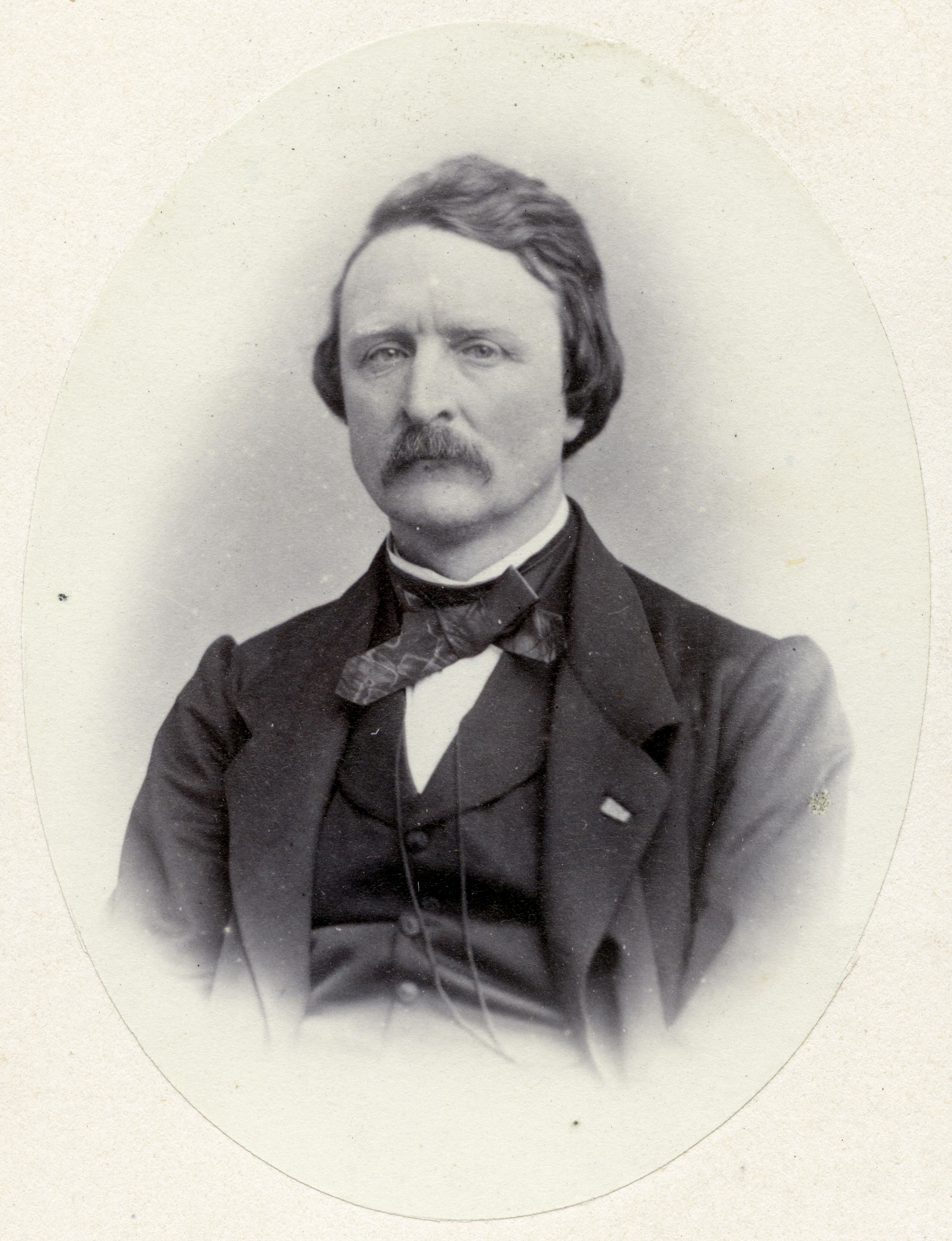
- Carte-de-visite
- Born: 22 June 1819; Painswick near Gloucester, England
- Died: 22 July 1877 (aged 58); Poitiers, France
- Education: Lycée Henri IV, Paris
- Spouse: Manuela Bolognesi
- Scientific career
- Fields: Physician, botanist, collector of specimens
- Institutions: Hôpital Cochin, Jardin des Plantes, Paris
- Author abbrev. (botany): Wedd.

Hugh Algernon Weddell (22 June 1819 – 22 July 1877) was an Anglo-French medical doctor and botanist, and specialised in South American flora after accompanying the botanist Castelnau on an expedition into the Andes from 1843 to 1848.

== Life and work ==
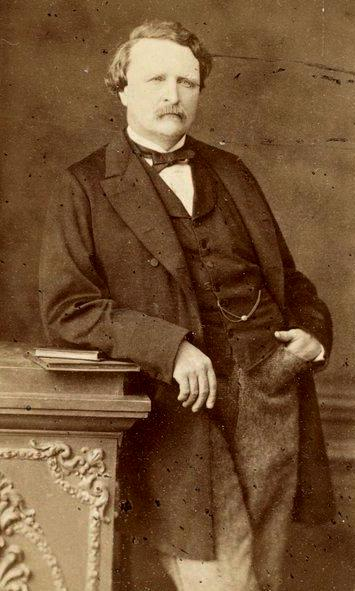

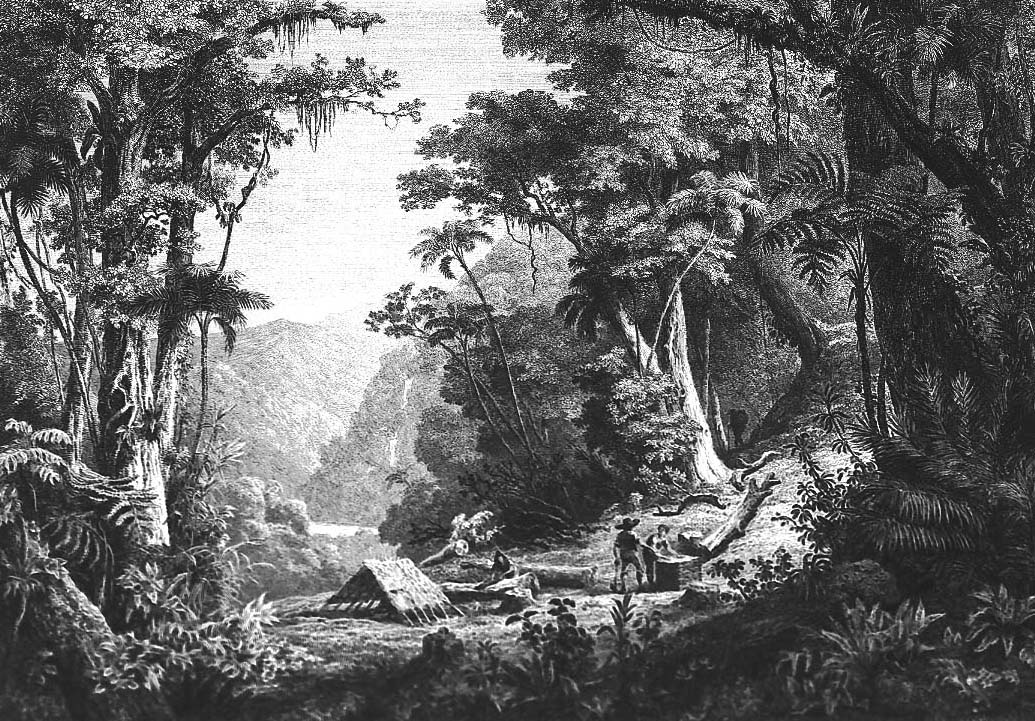
Vallée de San Juan del Oro by J. Denis in Histoire naturelle des quinquinas

Weddell was born at Birches House, Painswick near Gloucester, England. Commodore John Weddell was an ancestor while James Weddell was an uncle. He was raised in France after the family moved there and educated at Boulogne-sur-Mer and in Paris at the Lycée Henri IV, where he received a medical degree in 1841. He studied the medical uses of the Urticaceae. He had also studied botany and became a respected member of the French botanical fraternity. He worked with the pharmacist Pierre Jean Baptiste Chomel at the Hopital Cochin. While studying, he accompanied Adrien-Henri de Jussieu (1797–1853) on numerous botanizing expeditions and he became a collaborator with Ernest Cosson (1819–1889) and Jacques Germain de Saint-Pierre (1815–1882) in the preparation of Flore des environs de Paris (1845). In 1843, he was invited to join the expedition of François Louis de la Porte, comte de Castelnau to South America, and he explored and collected botanical specimens on that continent for five years.

In May 1845, Weddell left the expedition which was then in Paraguay, and proceeded on a solitary journey which would take him into Peru and Bolivia. Before leaving Paris, he had been particularly instructed by the Muséum national d'Histoire naturelle to undertake a thorough investigation of the Cinchona plant, or "fever bark" tree in its native habitat. Cinchona, the source of quinine, was of great commercial importance and Europeans had been investigating it for nearly two hundred years with the goal of cultivating it in regions far removed from the Andes mountains. Weddell explored a number of regions where the trees grew and identified no fewer than fifteen distinct species of the genus Cinchona (Rubiaceae). The seeds which he took back to Paris were germinated in the Jardin des Plantes, and the plants were used to establish Cinchona forests in Java and elsewhere in the East Indies. Weddell was interested in the effects of coca. He considered it a slow acting stimulant.

In 1847, he married Manuela Bolognesi, a resident of Arequipa. By March 1848, he had returned to Paris, leaving his wife in South America.

In Paris, Weddell was given the post of assistant naturalist at the museum. He held this office until 1853. Weddell made a second trip to South America in 1851. He returned to France and continued his medical practice in Bagnères-de-Bigorre and later at Poitiers where he died on 22 July 1877 while caring for his father.

== Honours ==
He is commemorated in the names of a number of organisms, including the dusky-headed parakeet, Aratinga weddellii (Deville, 1851), the fungal genus Weddellomyces, the Andean plant Diplostephium weddellii S.F.Blake (Compositae), the South American plant genus of Weddellina Tul., and the catfish Anadoras weddellii (Castelnau 1855). Weddell's work on cinchona which helped the Dutch led to his receiving an Order of the Netherlands Lion in 1855.

This botanist is denoted by the author abbreviation Wedd. when citing a botanical name.

== Publications ==
- Histoire naturelle des quinquinas (1849) – monograph describing the Cinchona plant
- Additions à la flore de l’Amérique du Sud (1850) – which gives the history of his first trip to South America.
- Voyage dans la Nord de la Bolivie (1853) – which describes his second trip to South America.
- Chloris andina: essai d’une flore de la region alpine des Cordillères de l’Amérique du Sud (two volumes) (1855–1861) – it constitutes the sixth part of Francis de Castelnau’s Expédition dans les parties centrals de l’Amérique du Sud (1850–1859).
