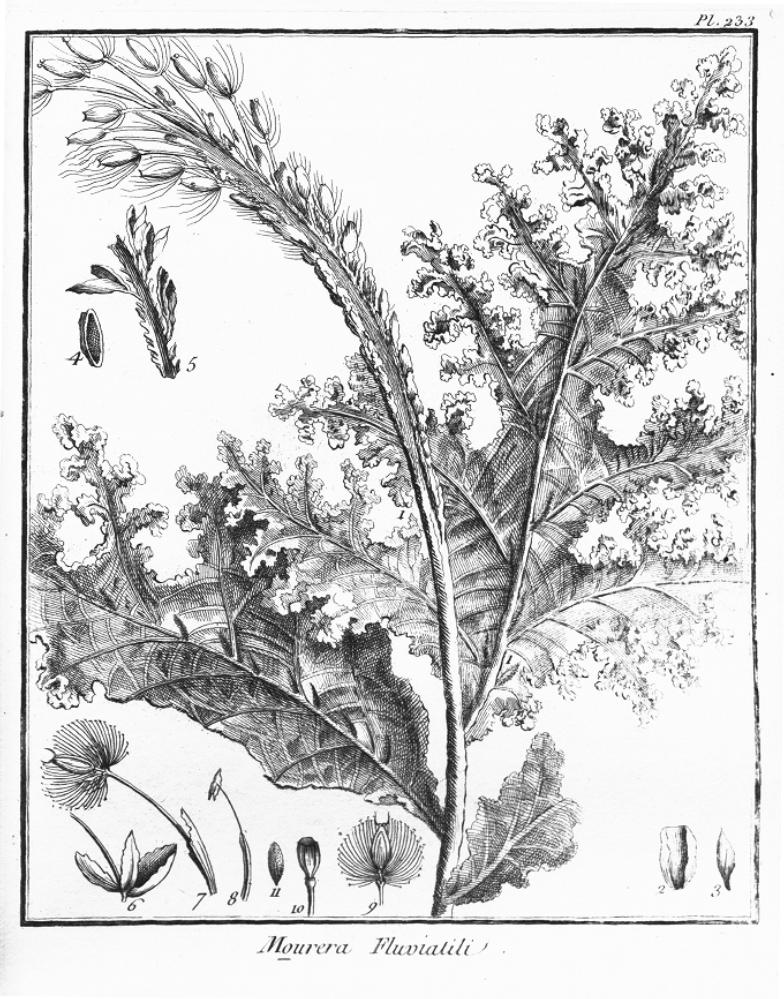
- Mourera fluviatilis

Scientific classification
- Kingdom: Plantae
- Clade: Tracheophytes
- Clade: Angiosperms
- Clade: Eudicots
- Clade: Rosids
- Order: Malpighiales
- Family: Podostemaceae; Rich. ex Kunth

Genera
- About 50; see text

= Podostemaceae =

Family of aquatic plants

Podostemaceae (riverweed family), a family in the order Malpighiales, comprise about 50 genera and c. 300 species of more or less thalloid aquatic herbs.

== Distribution and habitat ==
They are found mostly in tropical and subtropical areas worldwide. Many species are found in a very small geographic area, often even just a single river or waterfall. Because of their small range, many species are seriously threatened, especially from habitat loss (for example, due to dams flooding their habitat).

Riverweeds adhere to hard surfaces (generally rock) in rapids and waterfalls of rivers. They are submerged when water levels are high, but during the dry season they live a terrestrial existence, flowering at this time. Their root anatomy is specialized for the purpose of clinging to rocks, and in fact, details of the root structure are one of the ways of classifying riverweeds.

== Ecology ==
In many rivers, Podostemaceae are an important food source for a wide range of animals. For example, the tadpoles of the African goliath frog (world's largest frog) feed only on Dicraeia warmingii, and in South America several serrasalmid fish (Mylesinus, Ossubtus, Tometes and Utiaritichthys) mainly feed on Podostemaceae.

== Taxonomy ==
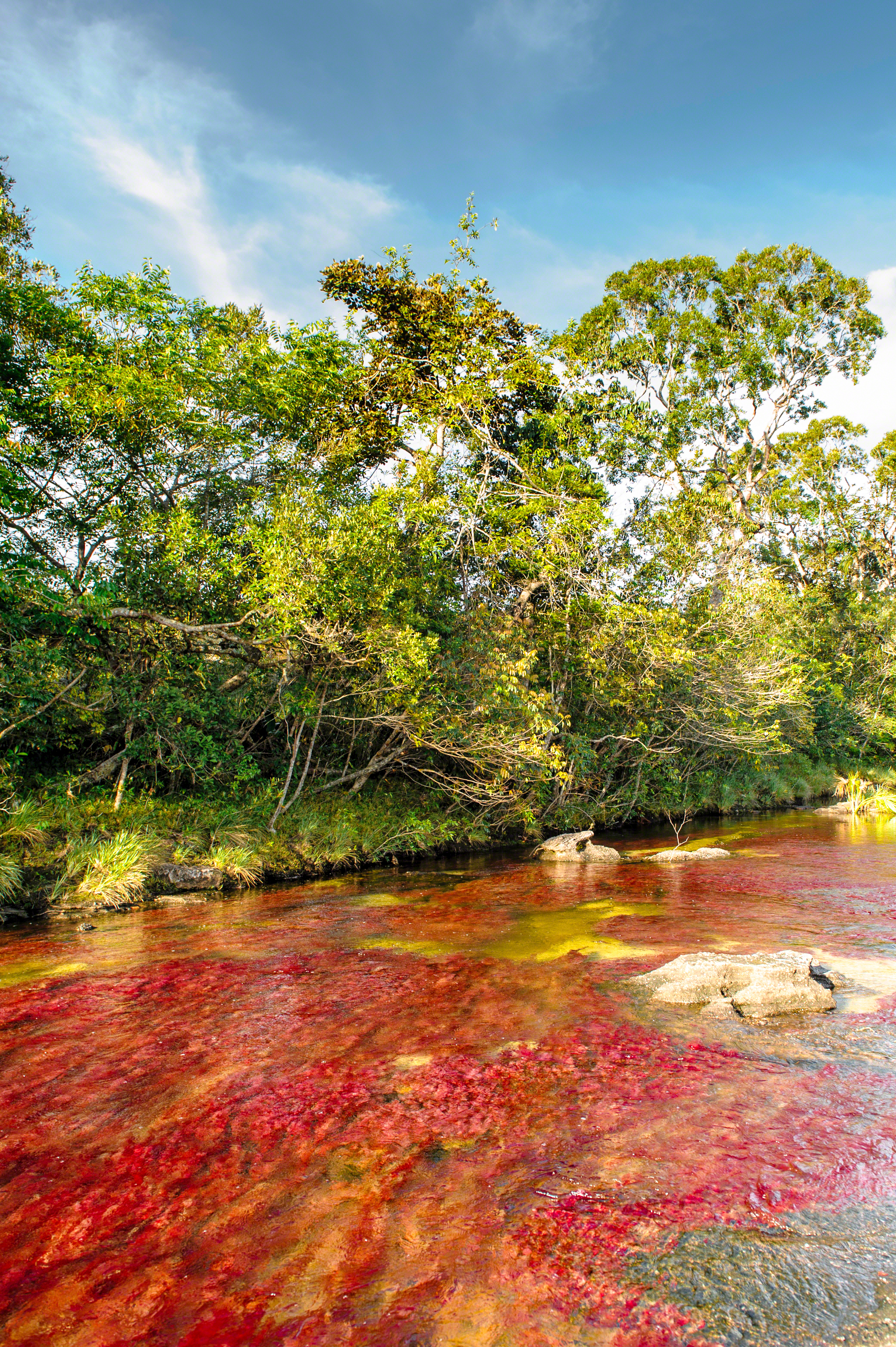
The Caño Cristales river in Colombia is famous for the bright red Rhyncholacis clavigera (syn. Macarenia clavigera), a species only found in Serranía de la Macarena

The Podostemaceae are related to the families Clusiaceae, Hypericaceae (the St. John's wort family, which is sometimes treated as a subfamily of Clusiaceae), and Bonnetiaceae. In the classification system of Dahlgren, Podostemaceae were placed as a single family in the Podostemales order, which was the only order in the superorder Podostemiflorae (also called Podostemanae).

The family is divided into three subfamilies, Podostemoideae, Tristichoideae, and Weddellinoideae. Tristichoideae is the most basally diverged, and is sister to the other two subfamilies.

=== Genera ===
52 genera are accepted.

- Angolaea Wedd.
- Apinagia Tul.
- Autana C.T.Philbrick
- Castelnavia Tul. & Wedd.
- Ceratolacis (Tul.) Wedd.
- Cipoia C.T.Philbrick, Novelo & Irgang
- Cladopus H.Möller
- Ctenobryum Koi & M.Kato
- Cussetia M.Kato
- Dalzellia Wight
- Diamantina Novelo, C.T.Philbrick & Irgang
- Dicraeanthus Engl.
- Djinga C.Cusset
- Endocaulos C.Cusset
- Farmeria Willis ex Hook.f.
- Hanseniella C.Cusset
- Hydrobryum Endl.
- Hydrodiscus Koi & M.Kato
- Indodalzellia Koi & M.Kato
- Indotristicha P.Royen
- Inversodicraea Engl. ex R.E.Fr.
- Laosia Koi, Won & M.Kato
- Lebbiea Cheek
- Ledermanniella Engl.
- Leiothylax Warm.
- Letestuella G.Taylor
- Lophogyne Tul.
- Macropodiella Engl.
- Marathrum Bonpl.
- Mourera Aubl.
- Noveloa C.T.Philbrick
- Oserya Tul. & Wedd.
- Paleodicraeia C.Cusset
- Paracladopus M.Kato
- Paradalzellia Koi, P.L.Uniyal & M.Kato
- Podostemum Michx.
- Pohliella Engl.
- Polypleurum (Tul.) Warm.
- Rhyncholacis Tul.
- Saxicolella Engl.
- Sphaerothylax Bisch. ex C.Krauss
- Stonesia G.Taylor
- Terniopsis H.C.Chao
- Thawatchaia M.Kato, Koi & Y.Kita
- Thelethylax C.Cusset
- Tristicha Thouars
- Weddellina Tul.
- Wettsteiniola Suess.
- Willisia Warm.
- Winklerella Engl.
- Zehnderia C.Cusset
- Zeylanidium (Tul.) Engl.

==== Moved to other families ====
- Hydrostachys from Madagascar. This genus seems to have relatively little in common with any other, and no affinity to the Podostemaceae except being aquatic; moved to its own family in the Cornales.

== See also ==
- Eugenius Warming, a botanist who studied the family
