= Edmond Tulasne =

French botanist and mycologist (1815–1885)

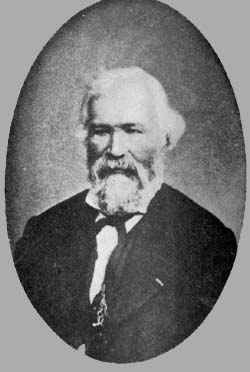
- Born: Louis René Étienne Tulasne; 12 September 1815; Azay-le-Rideau, France
- Died: 22 December 1885 (aged 70); Hyères, France
- Scientific career
- Fields: Botany; Mycology
- Author abbrev. (botany): Tul.

Louis René Étienne Tulasne, a.k.a. Edmond Tulasne (12 September 1815 – 22 December 1885) was a French botanist and mycologist born in Azay-le-Rideau.

He originally studied law at Poitiers, but his interest later turned to botany. As a young man he assisted botanist Auguste de Saint-Hilaire (1779–1853) with studies of Brazilian flora. From 1842 until 1872 he worked as a naturalist at the Muséum national d'histoire naturelle in Paris. In 1854 he succeeded Adrien-Henri de Jussieu (1797–1853) as a member of the Académie des sciences. He died in Hyères on 22 December 1885, age 70.

Tulasne's specialized study was the science of mycology. His microscopic investigation of fungi, particularly parasitic species, contributed much to the understanding on the complexities of their nature and development. He is credited with introducing the concept of "pleomorphy" in regard to fungi. Pleomorphy states that an individual fungus, growing in different substrates can have dramatically different forms. In 1853 he introduced his views on the reproduction cycle of Claviceps purpurea (ergot). Around this time he also developed an interest in lichens, and in 1852 Tulasne published an anatomical and morphological study of this group. It was in this work he introduced the term pycnidium to describe the asexual fruiting body found in many species of fungi.

A number of mycological species, as well as the genera Tulasneinia and Tulasnella (family Tulasnellaceae) are named after him. He is credited with providing classification taxa for the following genera: Crucibulum, Glomus, Sebacina, Terfezia, Tilletia and Hypomyces (the latter genus with Elias Magnus Fries).

He also produced some important works on flowering plants. For example, in 1855, he published two papers on the magnoliid family Monimiaceae, in which he included what are now the Lauralean families Siparunaceae and Atherospermataceae.

Tulasne published over 50 scientific articles during his career. Some of his best work was done in collaboration with his brother, Charles Tulasne (1816–1884), such as "Fungi hypogaei" (1851) and the three-volume "Selecta fungorum carpologia" (1861–65). The latter work is known for its superb detailed illustrations, being created by Charles Tulasne.

Many of his works were published under the Latinized name "Ludovicus-Renatus".

The standard author abbreviation Tul. is used to indicate this person as the author when citing a botanical name.

== See also ==
- Category:Taxa named by Edmond Tulasne
