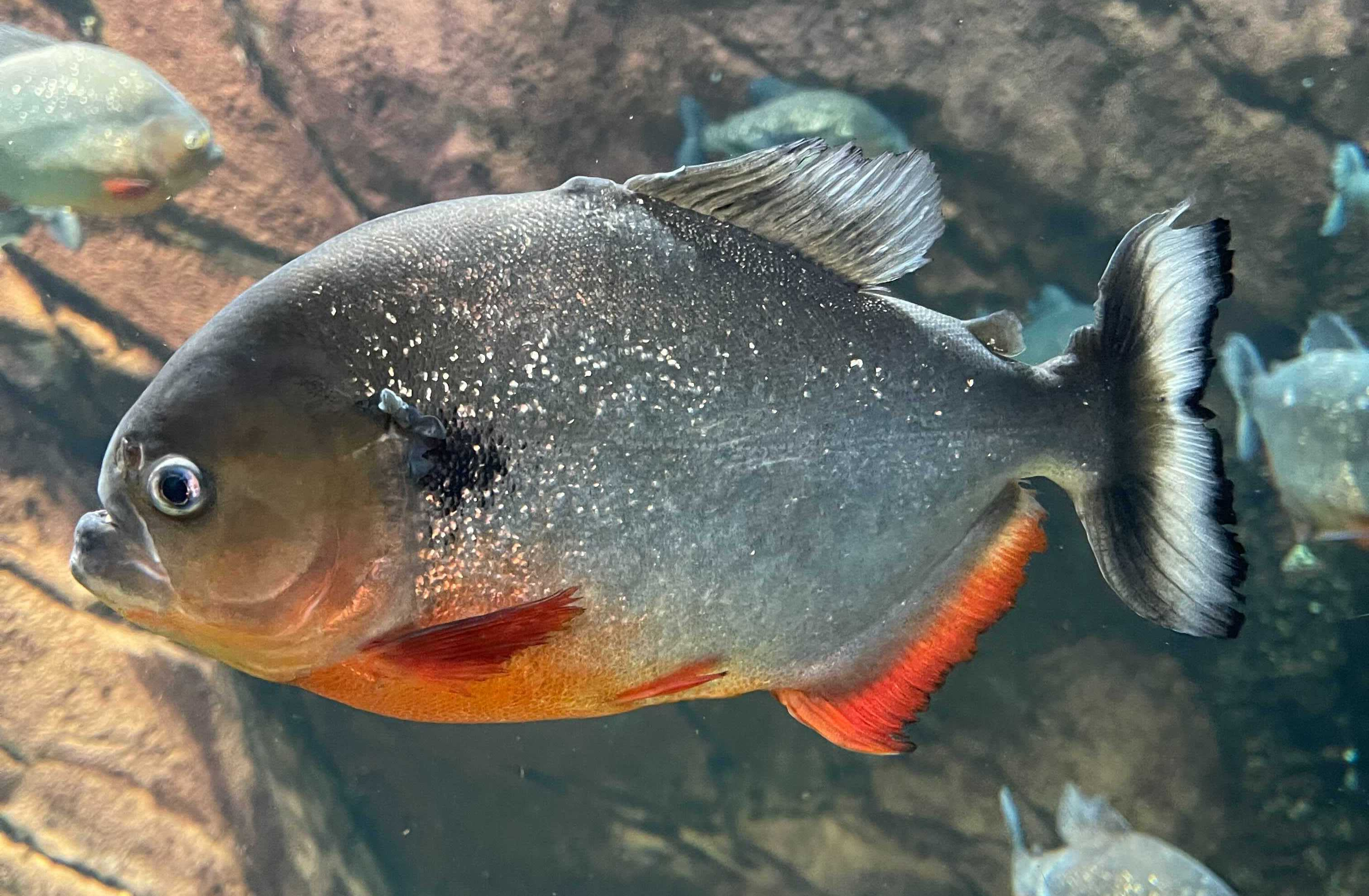

Conservation status
- Least Concern (IUCN 3.1)

Scientific classification
- Kingdom: Animalia
- Phylum: Chordata
- Class: Actinopterygii
- Division: Teleostei
- Order: Characiformes
- Family: Serrasalmidae
- Genus: Pygocentrus
- Species: P. cariba

Binomial name
- Pygocentrus cariba (Humboldt, 1821)

Synonyms
- Serrasalmo cariba Humboldt, 1821; Serrasalmus caribe Valenciennes, 1850; Serrasalmo (Pygocentrus) notatus Lütken, 1875; Pygocentrus notatus (Lütken, 1875); Pygocentrus stigmaterythraeus Fowler, 1911

= Pygocentrus cariba =

Species of fish

Pygocentrus cariba, the black spot piranha, is a species of freshwater ray-finned fish belonging to the family Serrasalmidae. Like other members of its family, the black spot piranha is native to northern South America, and is most commonly found in the Orinoco River Basin lowlands of Venezuela.

== Etymology ==
The black spot piranha belongs to the genus Pygocentrus, which is a combination of pygo-, which means "rump", and centrus, which means prickle; both parts are derived from Greek, and they refer to the serrated abdomen of these fishes. The specific name, cariba, is a local Venezuelan equivalent of the Brazilian word piranha.

== Taxonomy ==
The black spot piranha belongs to Serrasalmidae, which includes the pacus, piranhas and other related fish. Phylogenetically, the black spot piranha occupies the basalmost position in it genus, meaning that it is the sister to the clade consisting of the remaining (two) species of the genus: the red-bellied piranha (Pygocentrus nattereri) and the piraya piranha (Pygocentrus piraya).

== Description ==
Pygocentrus cariba at the Georgia Aquarium

The black spot piranha can reach a total length of 27.9 cm (11.0 in). The largest recorded weight of a black spot piranha was 560 g. This species is known for its powerful bite that can inflict serious damage on both humans and other fish. In the Colombian regions, this species is typically around 40 cm (16 in), while the ones living in Venezuela are commonly bigger, weighing up to 1kg and averaging around 48 cm (19 in) in length. Many larger adults form spots on the dorsal and side regions of the body that are often silver in color and the underside of the fish is bright orange. These fish also display a prominent dark blotch and have four supraneurals.

== Distribution and Habitat ==
Orinoco River Basin, habitat of the pygocentrus cariba

This species is most commonly found in the Orinoco River between the Orinoco and Delta regions; additionally, it can be found in areas of Colombia. In the lower regions of the great rivers and flood plains, this species is particularly abundant.

Adults mainly live in large rivers or lagoons while juveniles often reside in sediment filled shallow water, also known as shoals, or flooded regions. They are a freshwater species and prefer wetlands and inland waters. They typically live in waters ranging from 20-28°C with a pH between 4.0 and 7.0.

== Behavior ==
=== Diet ===
The black spot piranha is primarily a carnivorous species that feeds on a wide variety of fish, carrion, invertebrates, and other aquatic animals. Adults tend to eat smaller fish and vertebrates, while the juveniles eat shrimp, insects, and zooplankton. Some may even eat seeds, fruits, and leaves. Due to its control over the population of its prey, this species has been identified as a keystone species and plays a large role in the balance of the surrounding ecosystem.

=== Migration ===
This species is an altitudinal migrant, meaning that it moves short distances between low and high altitudes. This species has the highest population between the months of August and November.

Pygocentrus cariba color change during mating season

=== Reproduction ===
Peak reproductive time for black spot piranhas is between the months of May and June. During mating season, the colors of adult black spot piranha's fins turn a darker color. During this time, the red colors of the fish may disappear as well. This is a change that occurs in both the male and female piranhas. In some black spot piranhas, this change is permanent and remains even after mating season. In others the change is temporary, and their fins return to normal colors after mating season has ended.

== Conservation Status ==
As of 2020, the IUCN has assessed the black spot piranha as a Least Concern species. It is often used for sport fishing and often has ornamental uses (for example, it may be found in the aquarium trade of the United States). In certain areas, it is also dissected and used in the trade and jewelry markets. Despite this, the species has a stable population and is not currently at risk of extinction. Due to this, there are no conservation measures being taken.
