= Vroesenpark =

Community park in Rotterdam

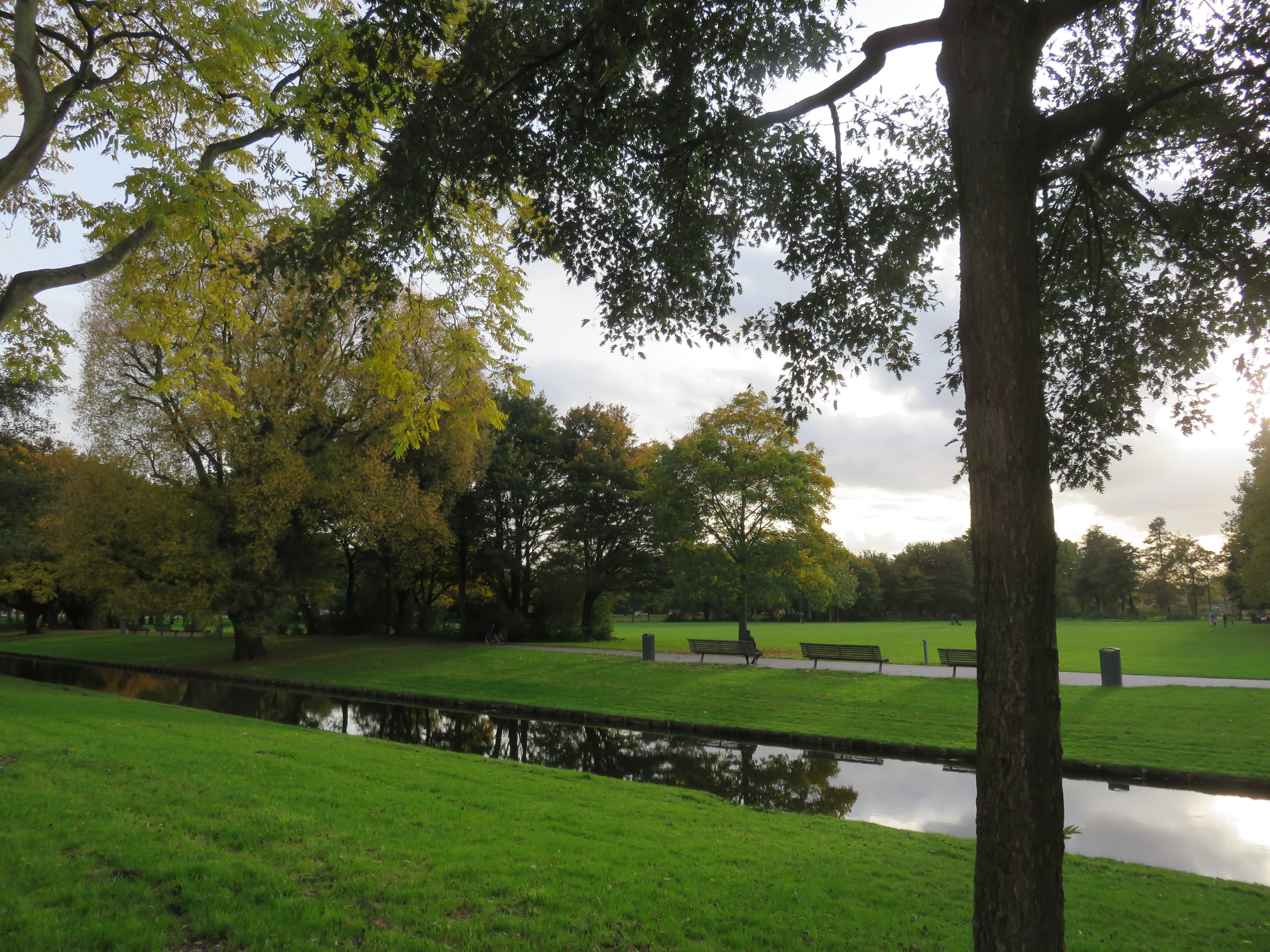
- Type: Community Park
- Location: Rotterdam-North, Rotterdam
- Coordinates: 51.929722°N 4.453333°E
- Area: 24.216327384 acres (9.800000000 ha)
- Status: Open
- Website: www.rotterdam.nl/vroesenpark

The Vroesenpark is a city park in Rotterdam-North.

== Details ==
The Vroesenpark was established in 1929 by city architect W.G. Witteveen. From 1940, the part of the park south of the Stadhoudersweg became part of Diergaarde Blijdorp. During the Dutch famine of 1944–1945, the rest of the park was cut down by residents.
