= Bergweg =

Coordinates: 51°56′8″N 4°28′35″E

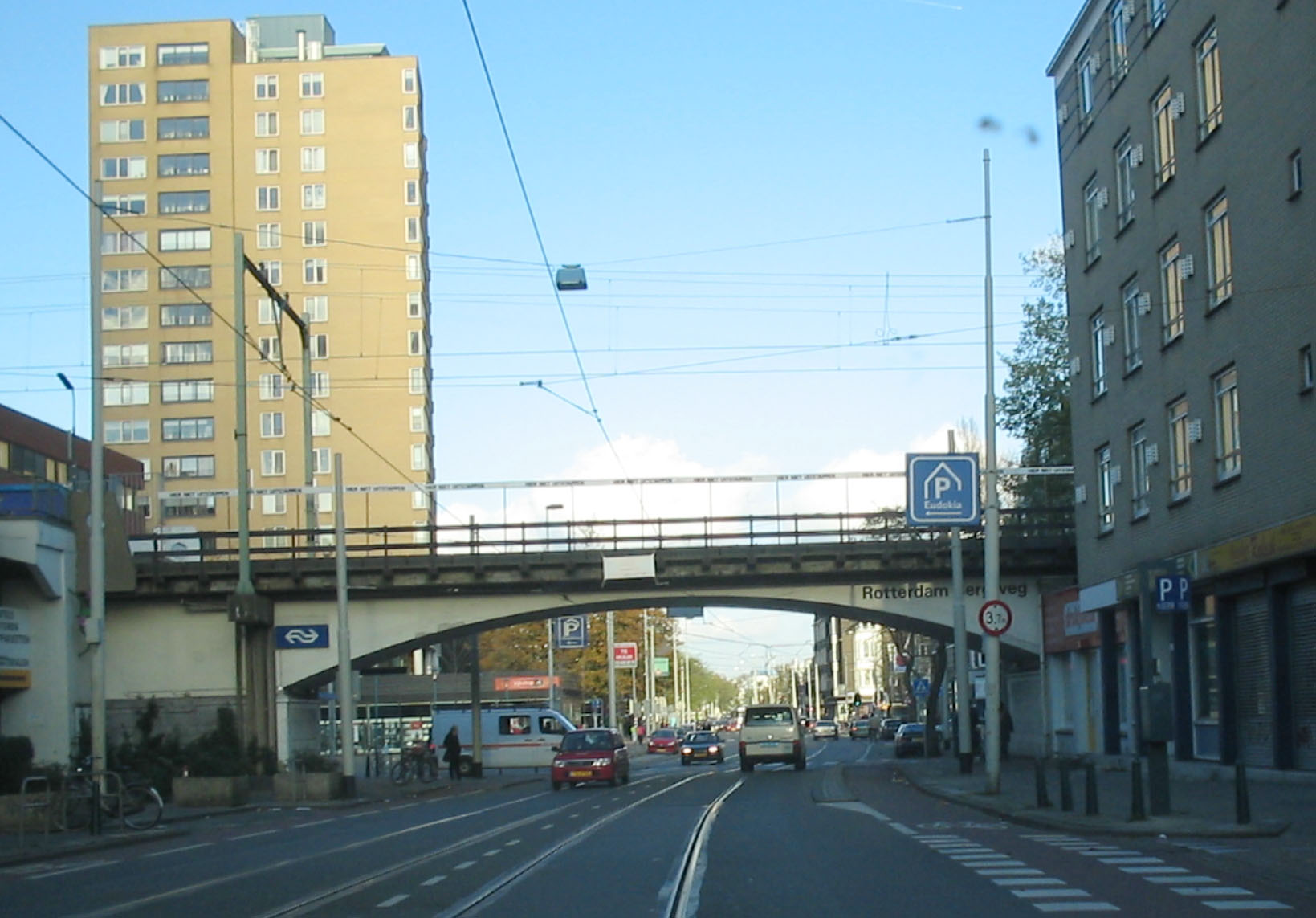
Bergweg, Rotterdam

Bergweg is a street in Rotterdam. It is the main street of Oude Noorden, running between Schiekade and Gordelweg. It connects Rotterdam with Bergschenhoek through Hillegersberg.

== History ==
Bergweg is one of the oldest streets in Rotterdam, dating back to the 12th century. It was called Blommersdijkscheweg and ran from where now Blijdorp is to Bergschenhoek. In 1897 it received the name Bergweg. In 1916 the old Bergweg was subdivided in parts that received a different name, including Walendorperweg, Bergweg, Straatweg, Dorpsstraat and Grindweg.

Bergweg was home to around a dozen Jewish families at the beginning of World War II who became victims of The Holocaust.

== Places of interest ==
The buildings mostly date from the early twentieth century. The Bergwegziekenhuis, a general hospital, was on Bergweg street as well as the Eudokia hospital for the chronically ill. These buildings were demolished at the end of the 20th century.

Cinema Victoria was on Bergweg street until 1971. The building was then used by Correct, a store for electronics. After years of abandonment, an apartment complex was built that gave the street a new look.

In the street lies the Rotterdam Noord railway station and the closed Bergweg railway station, turned foodmarket.
