= St Hildegard's Church, Rotterdam =

St Hildegard's Church
- Sint-Hildegardiskerk
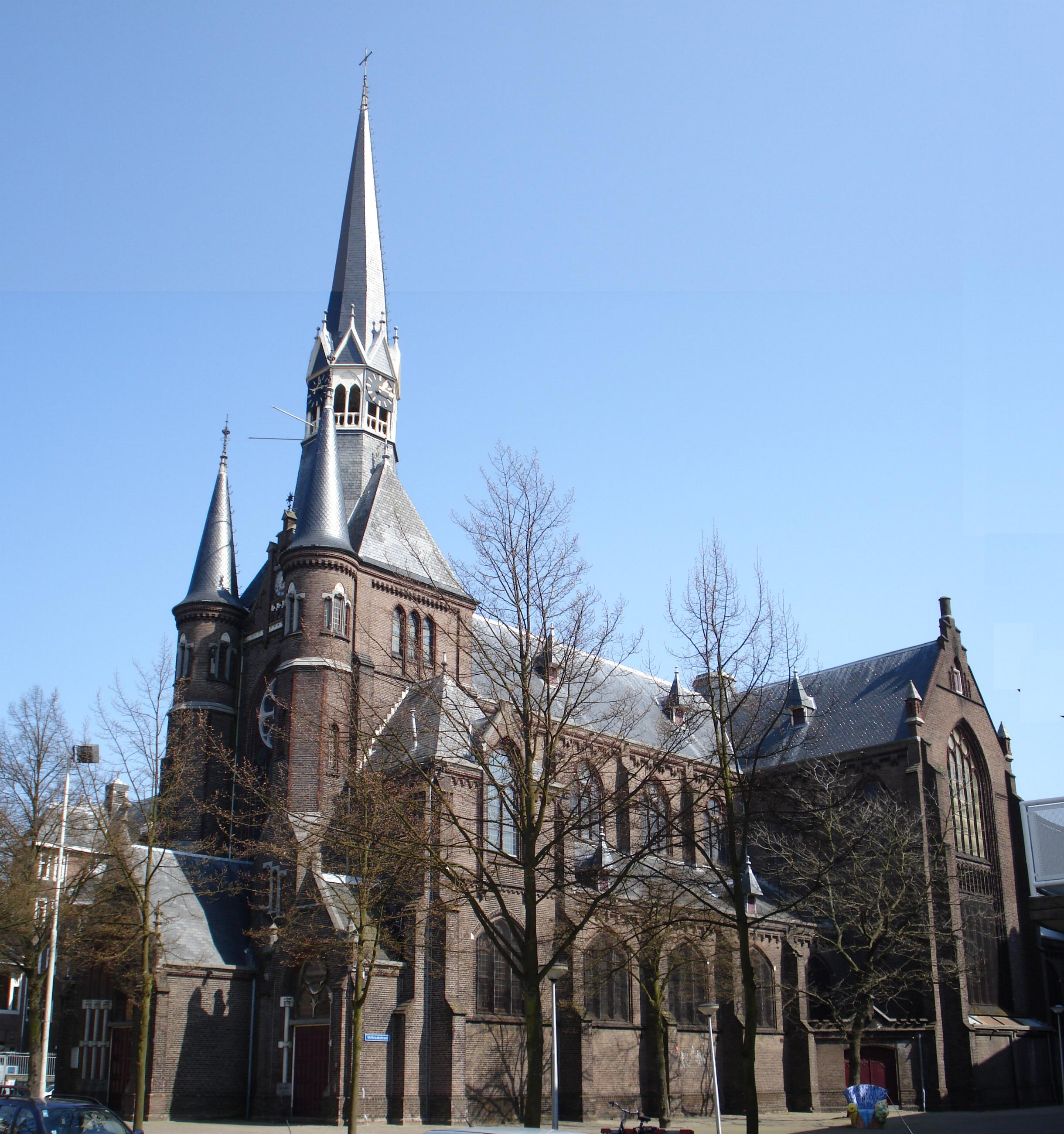
- The church in 2007
- St Hildegard's Church
- 51°56′16.92″N 4°28′57.25″E
- Location: Rotterdam, Netherlands
- Address: Hildegardisstraat 50, 3036 NX Rotterdam, Netherlands
- Denomination: Roman Catholic

History
- Dedication: Hildegard of Bingen

Architecture
- Architect: Evert Margry
- Style: Neo-Gothic
- Years built: 1891-1892

St Hildegard's Church (Dutch: Sint-Hildegardiskerk) is a Roman Catholic church in the Oude Noorden (in Hillegersberg, before the boundary changes of 1904) in Rotterdam, Netherlands.

The neo-Gothic cruciform church was built between 1890 and 1892 according to a design by the Rotterdam architect Evert Margry, one of the most important students of Pierre Cuyper. However, the church was completed by his brother Albert Margry and his colleague JM Snickers following his death in 1891. The church is dedicated to Saint Hildegard of Bingen. The original church consisted of the choir, a bay of the nave, and both transepts. Between 1904 and 1905, the church was enlarged by Margry and Snickers with a tower and four additional bays. The tower is quite similar to the tower of the Bonifatius Church in Zaandam from 1900.

The parish of Saints Hildegardis and Antonius used the church independently until 2008, before merging with two other Rotterdam parishes into the new parish of Saints Franciscus and Clara. The new parish now only uses the Hildegardis Church: the Church of the Holy Redeemer and Saint Barbara and the Church of the Holy Family were disposed of in 2008.

Together with the Sint-Lambertus Church in Kralingen, it is the last neo-Gothic church in Rotterdam still in use today. It is also a rijksmonument.
