= Zwartepoorte =

Zwartepoorte is a surname. Notable people with the surname include:

- Adrie Zwartepoorte (1917–1991), Dutch cyclist
- Henk Zwartepoorte (1949–2016), Dutch herpetologist
