= Olomouc Zoo =

Zoo in Olomouc, Czechia

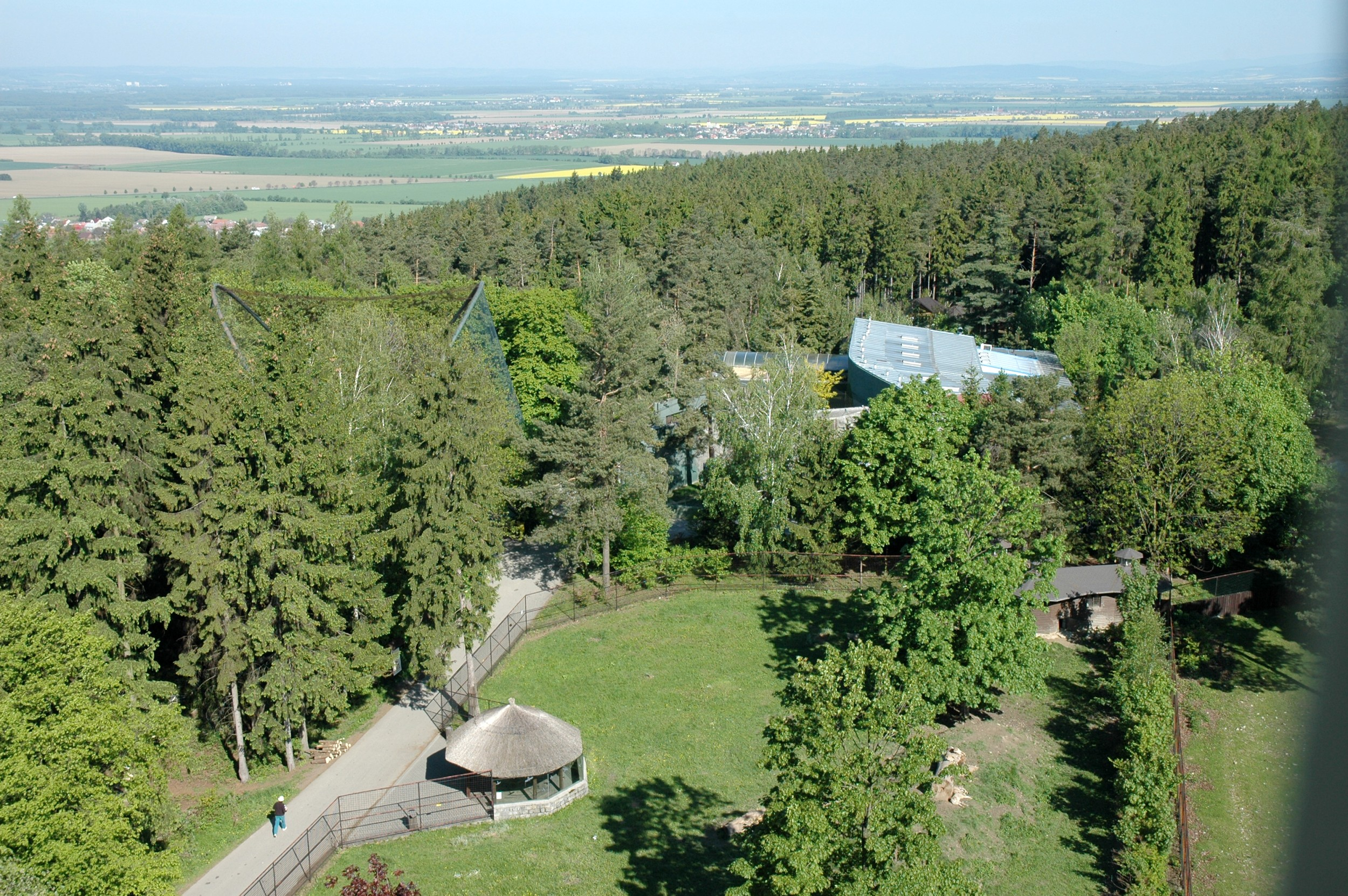
- Interactive map of Olomouc Zoo
- 49°38′02″N 17°20′33″E
- Date opened: 1956
- Location: Darwinova 29 779 00 Olomouc
- Land area: 42.5 hectares
- No. of animals: 1,861
- No. of species: 354
- Memberships: UCSZ, EAZA, EARAZA, WAZA, ESF
- Website: http://www.zoo-olomouc.cz/

Olomouc Zoo (Czech: Zoologická zahrada Olomouc) is a zoo in Olomouc-Svatý Kopeček in the Czech Republic.

Olomouc Zoo is one of the largest breeders of South African Gemsbok in Europe and the stud book keeper of the East Caucasian tur.
