= Oceanium =

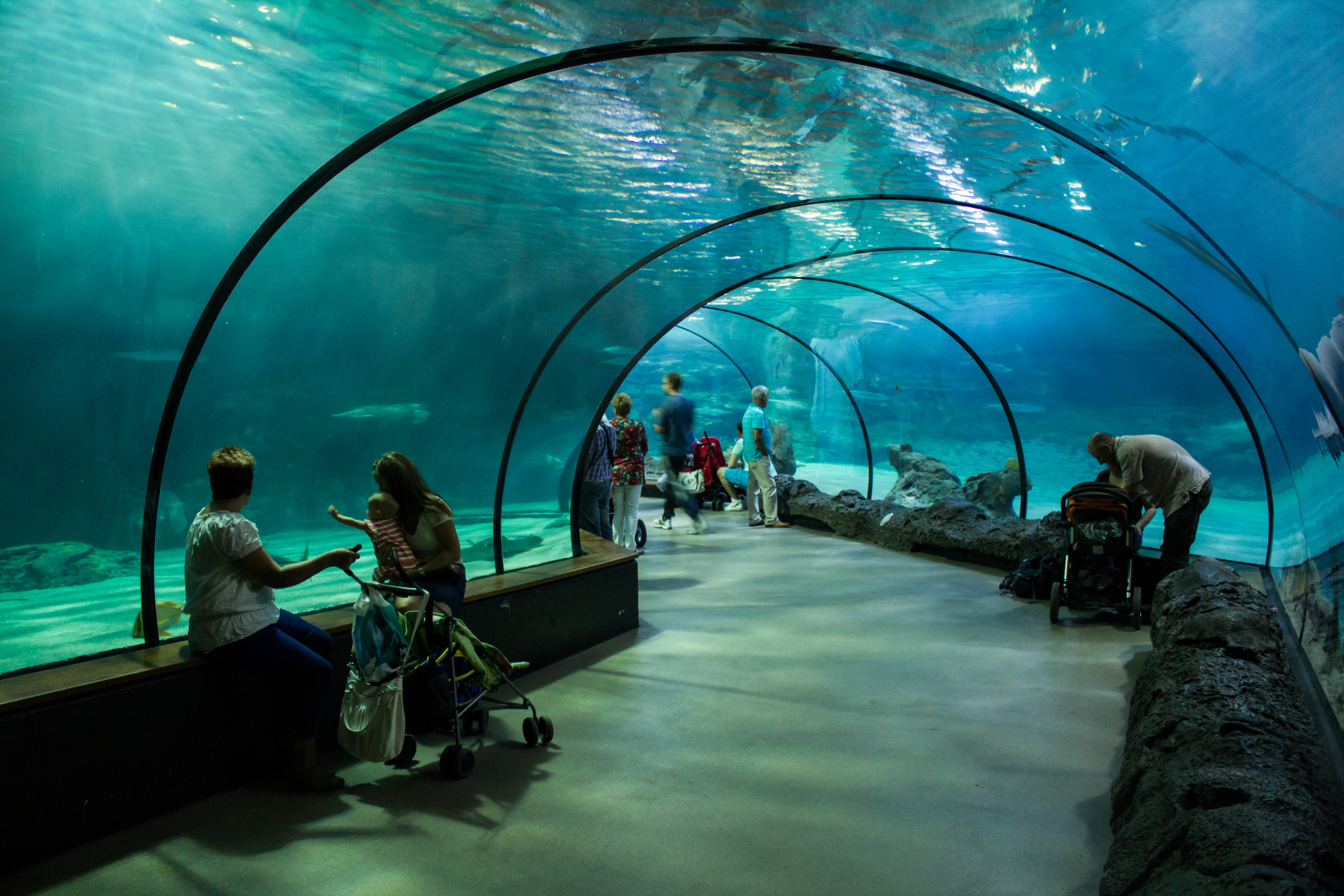
- Viewing tunnel at the aquarium, 2012
- Interactive map of Oceanium
- 51.9286°N 4.4454°E
- Date opened: 2001
- Location: Rotterdam, Netherlands
- Volume of largest tank: 3,375,000 L (742,000 imp gal; 892,000 US gal)
- Total volume of tanks: 8,000,000 L (1,800,000 imp gal; 2,100,000 US gal)
- Website: www.diergaardeblijdorp.nl?lang=EN

The Oceanium is a public aquarium that opened in 2001 in Diergaarde Blijdorp, a zoo in Rotterdam, Netherlands. The Oceanium lies in the expansion area of the zoo, which includes a new entrance and parking area, and was the biggest project to date for the zoo. The area around the Oceanium is home to projects depicting the Americas.

The Oceanium is also home to scientific research into the conservation of coral.

== Sunport ==
On the roof of the Oceanium is the largest solar power plant in the Netherlands within the built-up area. The plant has been given the name 'Sunport'. The 5000 square meter roof area of the Oceanium contains around 3400 black/grey colored solar panels, with a combined capacity of 510 kilowatt peak. The solar power station supplies approximately 325,000 kWh of electricity per year. Blijdorp immediately uses the electricity generated in the Oceanium itself, especially to cool the king penguins' enclosure. The solar power plant has cost nearly 3.9 million euros, including construction, maintenance and an educational program. The power station was officially opened by Ivo Opstelten, then mayor of Rotterdam.

== Seawater ==
All aquaria in the Oceanium contain clean seawater, in total that is more than eight million liters of water. Only 2 to 5% of the total is changed monthly, thanks to the 10 filters that keep the water clean with 22 different modules. This means that all the water in the shark tank (3375 m^{3}) can be completely filtered and pumped around in 160 minutes.

Blijdorp also receives water from a Maersk container ship that loads seawater into its ballast tanks near Newfoundland. In the Port of Rotterdam, the balance of the ship changes because containers are unloaded on the port side, so that the container ship has to discharge water. If the water quality is good, Blijdorp will have the opportunity to collect the water with an inland vessel that will transport it to the Oceanium.

== Animals (selection) ==
- Puffin
- Kittiwake
- Guillemot
- Eider
- European bass
- Gilt-head bream
- Homarus gammarus
- Nursehound
- Small-spotted catshark
- Starry smooth-hound
- Atlantic sturgeon
- European plaice
- Atlantic mackerel
- Asterias rubens
- Nurse shark
- Sandbar shark
- Blacktip shark
- Blacknose shark
- Green sea turtle
- Hawksbill sea turtle
- Great barracuda
- Hippocampus hippocampus
- Cownose ray
- Lookdown
- Elops saurus
- Longnose gar
- Red-bellied piranha
- King penguin
- Gentoo penguin
- Galápagos tortoise
- Common stingray
- Trisopterus luscus
- California sea lion
- California sheephead
- Beadlet anemone
