= European Studbook =

European Studbook may refer to:

- The European Studbook (ESB) of the European Association of Zoos and Aquaria (see also: the European Endangered Species Programme)
- The European Studbook Foundation: focused on reptile and amphibian

== See also ==
- Studbook (breed registry)
