= Agniesebuurt =

Coordinates: 51°55′46″N 4°28′36″E

- Neighborhood
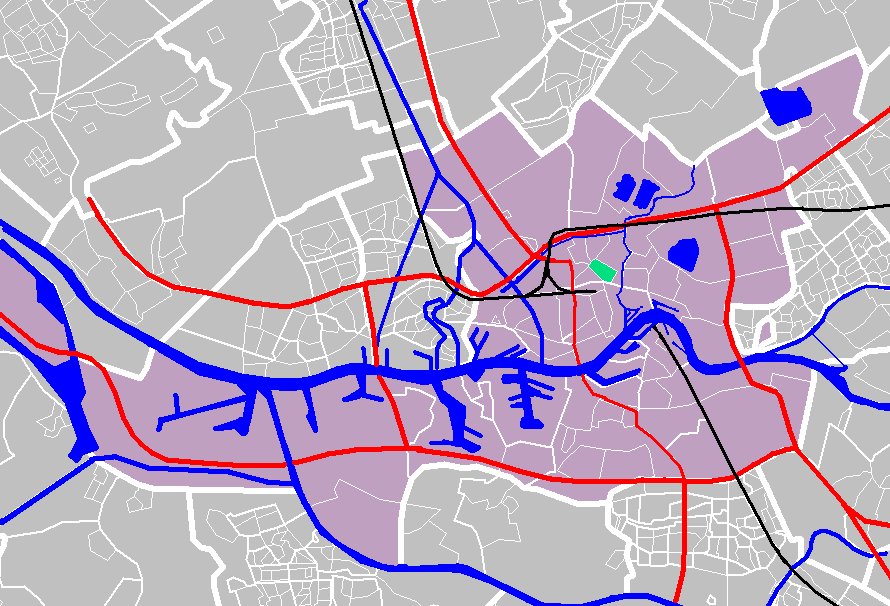
- Interactive map of Agniesebuurt
- Country: Netherlands
- Province: South Holland
- COROP: Rotterdam
- Borough: Noord

Area
  - Total: 0.96 sq mi (2.48 km^{2})

Population
  - Total: 4,171
- Time zone: UTC+1 (CET)

Agniesebuurt is a neighborhood in Rotterdam, Netherlands in Rotterdam-Noord.

Agniesebuurt is located next to Rotterdam Centraal station and the Coolsingel.
