= Blijdorp (district) =

Neighbourhood in the Netherlands

Coordinates: 51°55′49″N 4°27′29″E

- Neighbourhood
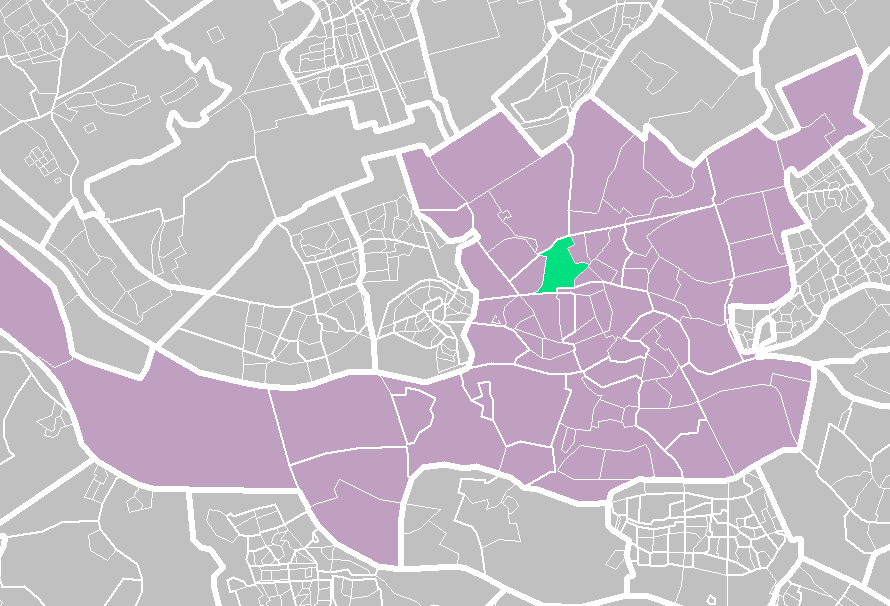
- Interactive map of Blijdorp
- Country: Netherlands
- Province: South Holland
- COROP: Rotterdam
- Borough: Noord
- Time zone: UTC+1 (CET)

Blijdorp (Dutch pronunciation: [ˈblɛidɔr(ə)p]) is a neighbourhood in northern Rotterdam and is part of the borough Noord. The neighbourhood has around 9500 inhabitants.

== Construction of the district ==
The construction of Blijdorp between 1931 and 1940 became possible after filling in the Rotterdamse Schie in the Blijdorpse polder, from which the district is named. The district is bounded by the Noorderhavenkade (the location of the Noorderhaven, filled in in 1940), the Noorderkanaal, the Schie-Schie kanaal and the railroad to Hook of Holland and Utrecht. Blijdorp borders the districts Bergpolder to the east and Provenierswijk to the south. Blijdorp is closely associated with the Rotterdam Zoo in the same district.

Blijdorp was not affected by the bombing of Rotterdam of May 14, 1940 though rubble from the city center was used to fill in certain areas in the district. After the bombardment many houseboats were built on the Noorderkanaal to meet the increased need for new houses.

== Special constructions ==
In 1954 a new synagogue was consecrated at the A.B.N. Davidsplein, named after the chief rabbi of Rotterdam Bernard Davids who died in Bergen-Belsen, 22 February 1945.

In the middle of the district is the monumental residential complex De Eendracht, designed by architect Jo van den Broek, which is included in the register of National Heritage Sites. Van den Broek designed the houses under the motto 'light, air and space'. The apartments had a day and night floor plan. Sliding doors with lots of glass in them and folding beds turned the master bedroom into a playroom and the older children's bedroom into a study. Because a house has two corridors, the toilet, bathroom and kitchen remained accessible to everyone in the nighttime situation without having to go through a bedroom. Between the living room and the kitchen was a passing service cabinet.

== Conservation area ==
Blijdorp has been nominated by the municipality Rotterdam for the status of conservation area.
