= Liskwartier =

Coordinates: 51°56′12″N 4°28′24″E

- Neighborhood of Rotterdam
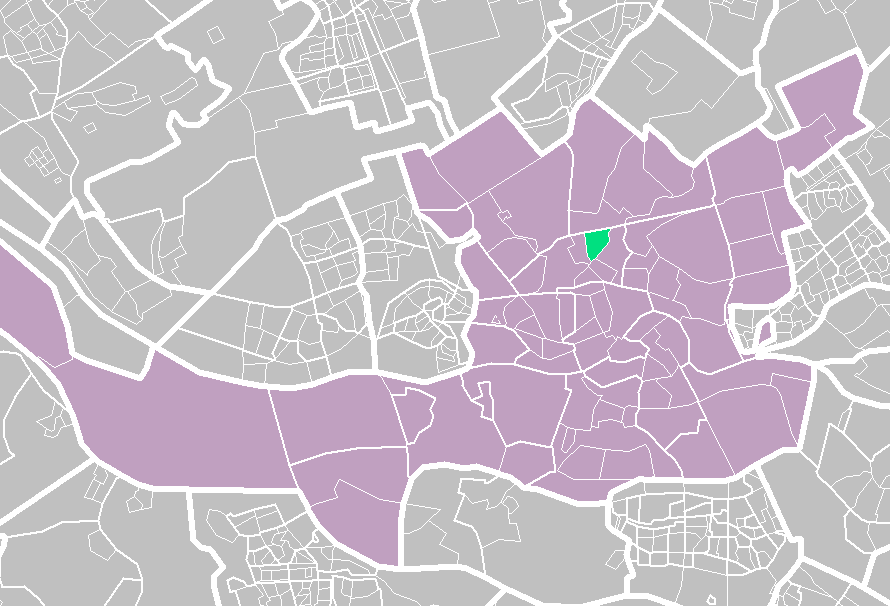
- Interactive map of Liskwartier
- Country: Netherlands
- Province: South Holland
- COROP: Rotterdam
- Borough: Noord
- Time zone: UTC+1 (CET)

Liskwartier is a neighborhood of Rotterdam, Netherlands.
