= Noord, Rotterdam =

Noord
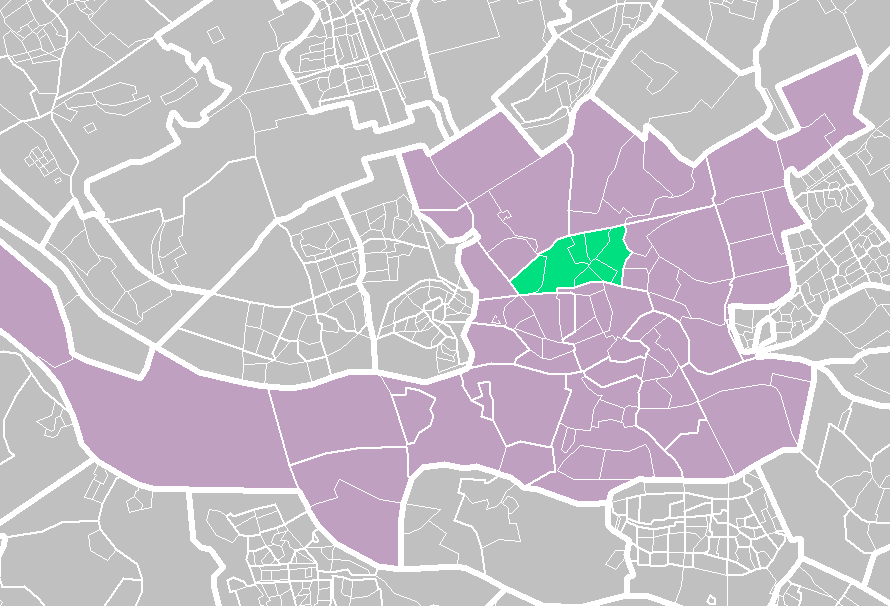
- Coordinates: 51.93°N 4.47°E
- Country: Netherlands
- Province: South Holland
- Municipality: Rotterdam

Population (2017)
  - Total: 51,796

Noord (English: Rotterdam-North) is a borough of Rotterdam. The municipal portion is formed by the Delfshavense Schie, the Highway 20 (A20), the Rotte and the rails. The borough had 51,796 inhabitants in 2017.

== Neighborhoods ==
The borough Noord consists of the neighborhoods:

- Liskwartier
- Oude Noorden
- Agniesebuurt
- Provenierswijk
- Blijdorp (with the same named zoo)
- Bergpolder

== Transport ==
Noord is served by three Rotterdam tram lines (Tram 4, 8, and 25), four bus lines (Bus 33, 38, 40, and 44), and Blijdorp RandstadRail station.

The Rotterdam Noord railway station is located on the northern border of the borough. Prior to 2006, the borough was also served by the Rotterdam Bergweg and Rotterdam Hofplein stations, both located on the Hofpleinlijn. The Hofpleinlijn was converted in 2006 to light rail with Rotterdam Bergweg closing the same year. Rotterdam Hofplein was closed in 2010 with the opening of the Blijdorp RandstadRail station which integrated the Rotterdam Metro with RandstadRail.
