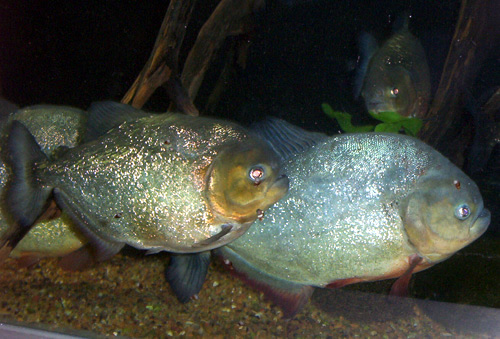

Scientific classification
- Kingdom: Animalia
- Phylum: Chordata
- Class: Actinopterygii
- Order: Characiformes
- Family: Serrasalmidae
- Subfamily: Serrasalminae
- Genus: Pygocentrus; J. P. Müller & Troschel, 1844

Type species
- Serrasalmus piraya G. Cuvier, 1819

Synonyms
- Gastropristis C. H. Eigenmann, 1915; Rooseveltiella C. H. Eigenmann, 1915; Taddyella H. von Ihering, 1928

= Pygocentrus =

Genus of fishes

Pygocentrus is a genus of freshwater ray-finned fishes belonging to the family Serrasalmidae, which includes the pacus, piranhas and related fishes. All species are native to tropical and subtropical South America. All the species are predatory, scavengers and may form large schools. The famous red-bellied piranha, Pygocentrus nattereri, is one of four species in the genus.

== Species ==
These are the currently recognized species in this genus:

- Pygocentrus cariba (Humboldt, 1821) (black spot piranha)
- Pygocentrus nattereri Kner, 1858 (red piranha, red-bellied piranha)
- Pygocentrus piraya (G. Cuvier, 1819) (San Francisco piranha)

Pygocentrus palometa Valenciennes, 1850 is regarded as a nomen dubium.
