= Bergpolder =

Coordinates: 51°56′08″N 4°27′59″E

- Neighborhood of Rotterdam
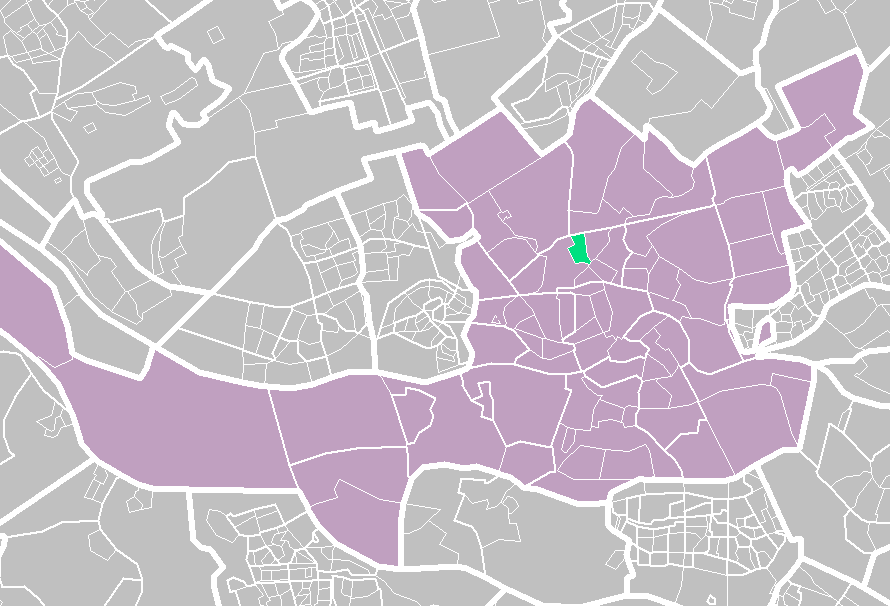
- Interactive map of Bergpolder
- Country: Netherlands
- Province: South Holland
- COROP: Rotterdam
- Borough: Noord

Area
  - Total: 1.22 sq mi (3.16 km^{2})

Population (2021)
  - Total: 8,205
- Time zone: UTC+1 (CET)

Bergpolder is a neighborhood of Rotterdam, Netherlands in Rotterdam-Noord. Since November 5, 2014, the district is part of the protected historic area "Rijksbeschermd gezicht Blijdorp/Bergpolder".

Bergpolder has 8,205 inhabitants (as of 2021) with a large number of different nationalities. The percentage of immigrants is 40%, of which two thirds were of non-Western origin. In 2007 the district was still named Vogelaarwijk. The WOZ (Real Estate Valuation Act) value of the homes has risen to €216,000 until 2020 and almost 60% of the residents now have a high level of education. The large size of the group of single-person households, students and starters is typical of Bergpolder. More than half of the residents are single.

Together with the Blijdorp, Bergpolder is a city district based on the expansion plan of Rotterdam from 1931 by engineer Willem Gerrit Witteveen in collaboration with architect Willem Kromhout. The neighborhood was laid out between 1930 and 1935 and named after the polder of the same name.

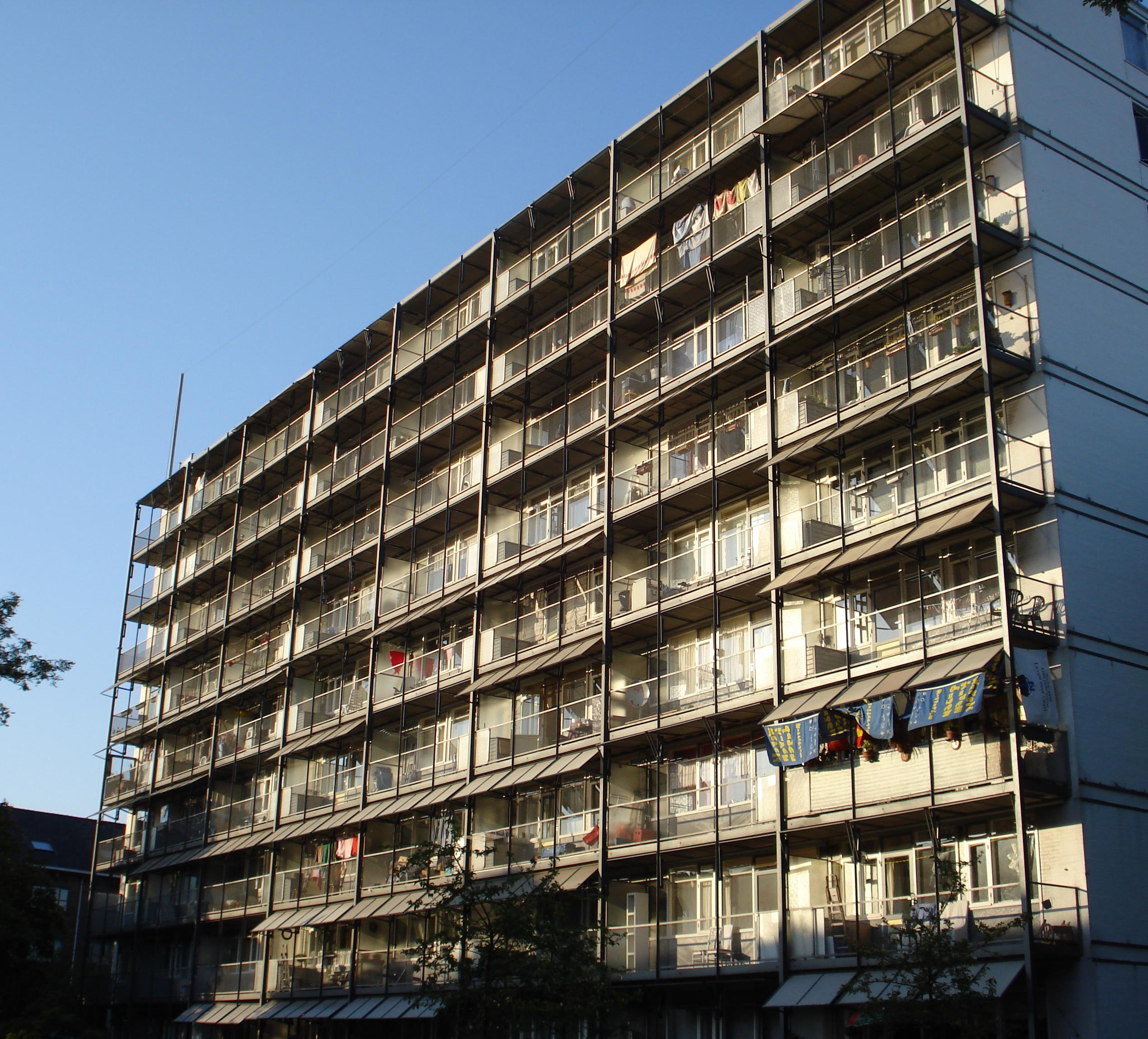
Bergpolderflat before renovation

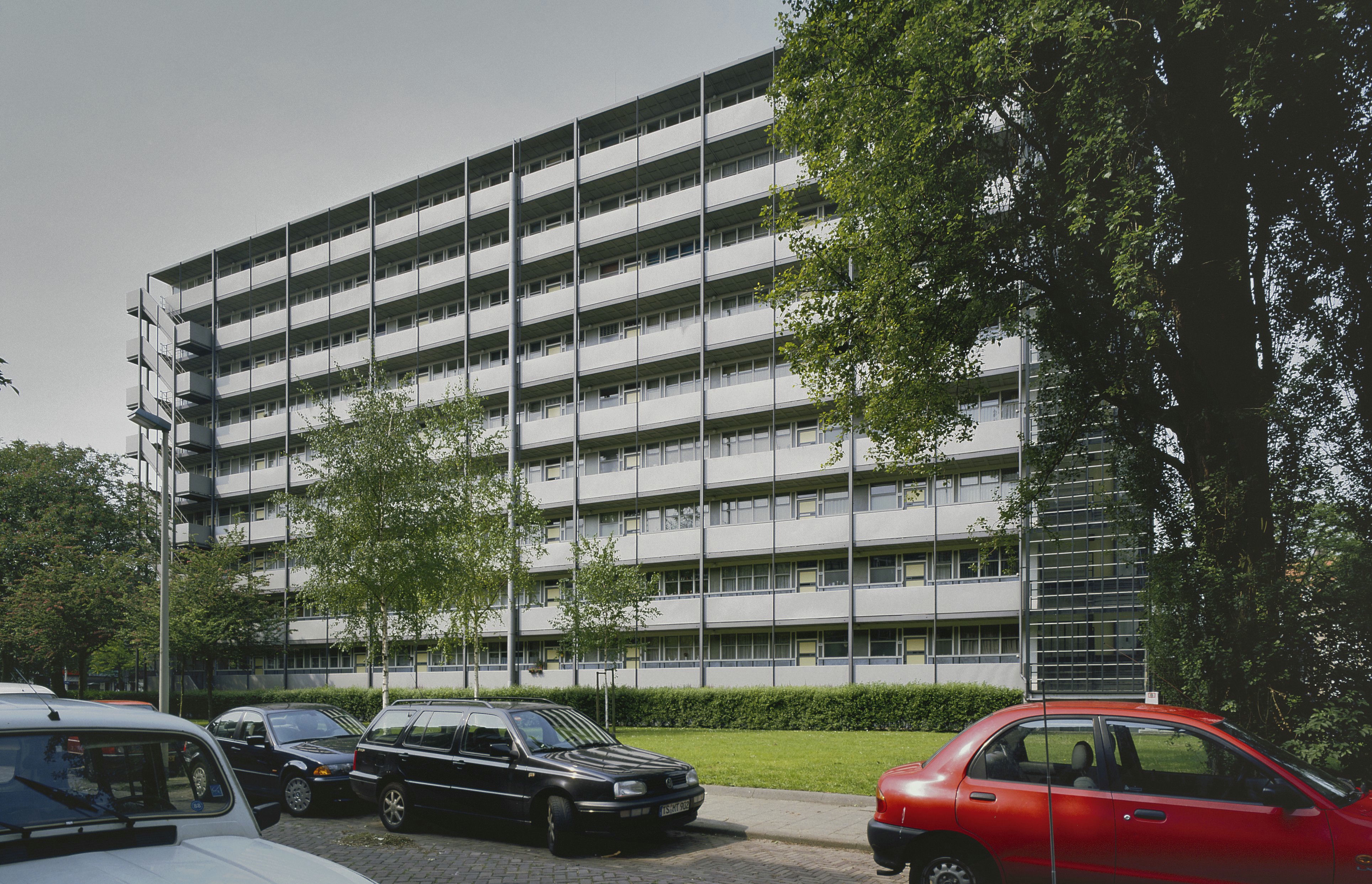
Bergpolderflat after renovation in 1993

The Bergpolderflat, the first gallery flat in the Netherlands built in 1933, now a national heritage site, is the main attraction of the neighborhood, together with the Sportfondsenbad Noord (swimming pool) on the Van Maanenstraat. The Sophia Kinderziekenhuis (Sophia Children's Hospital) (originally founded in 1863) was relocated in 1936 to the northern border of Bergpolder, near the Polderweg. The hospital moved to a new building as part of the Erasmus Medical Center in 1994.
