= Henk Zwartepoorte =

Dutch herpetologist (1949–2016)

- Born: 4 September 1949; Rotterdam, Netherlands
- Died: 28 October 2016 (aged 67); Litchfield National Park, Northern Territory, Australia
- Occupation: Herpetologist
- Employer: Diergaarde Blijdorp

Henk Zwartepoorte (4 September 1949 – 28 October 2016) was a Dutch herpetologist. During his career from the 1970s until 2014, he worked at Diergaarde Blijdorp in Rotterdam as zookeeper and later curator of the amphibians and reptiles. Zwartepoorte was highly involved in the breeding and conservation of reptiles, especially turtles. He helped in redistributing turtles that were impounded by authorities. Zwartepoorte served as President of the European Studbook Foundation from 2003 until 2016.

== Life and career ==
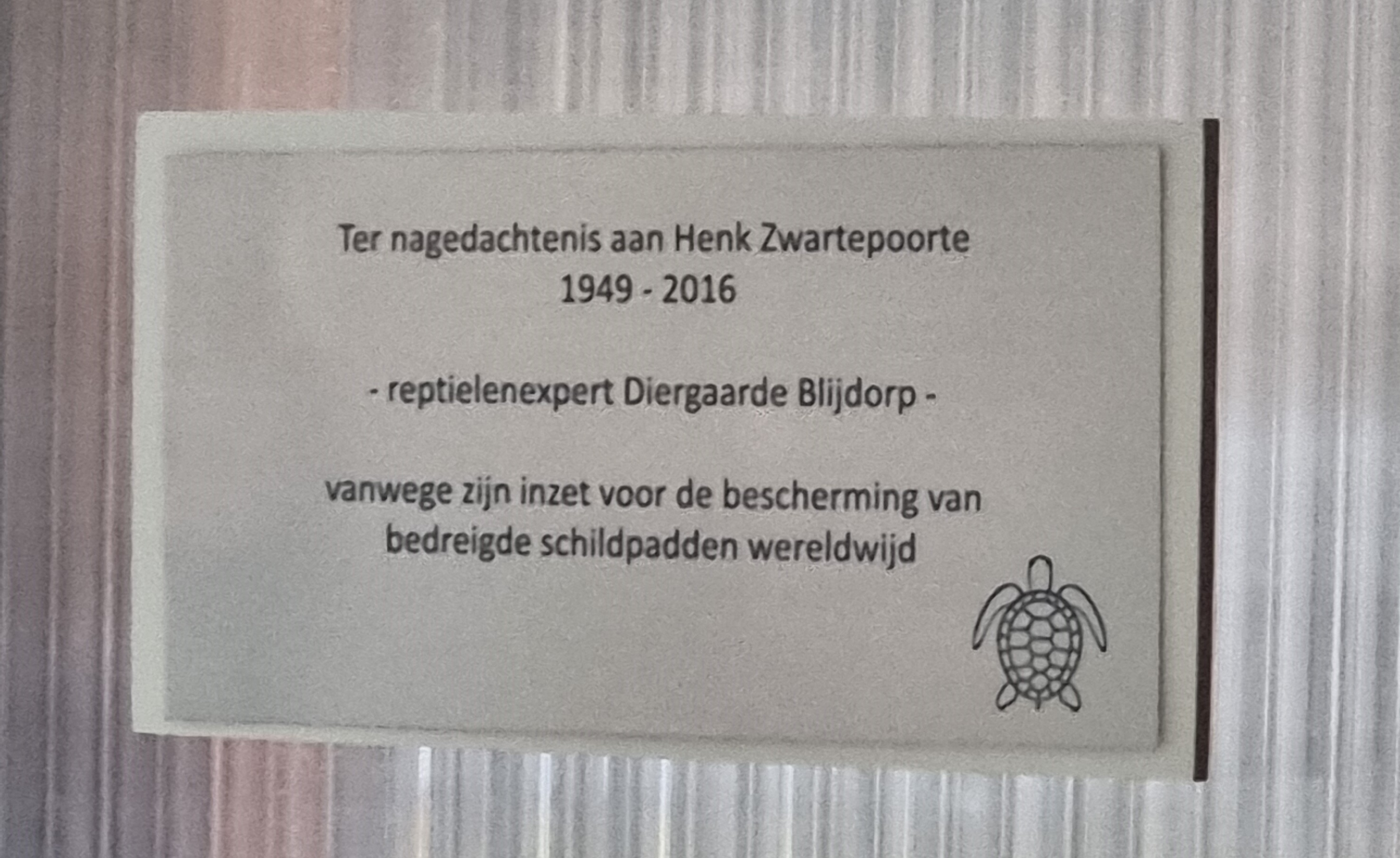
Plaque for Henk Zwartepoorte at the conservation centre, Oceanium, Blijdorp. Stating: "In memory of Henk Zwartepoorte 1949–2016 -herpetologist Blijdorp Zoo-for his efforts in the worldwide protection of endangered turtles"

Zwartepoorte was born on 4 September 1949 in Rotterdam. In the 1970s Zwartepoorte started working as a zookeeper at Blijdorp. After he started working in the reptiles department he became interested in turtles. Shortly afterwards he joined the Nederlands-Belgische Schildpadden Vereniging and subsequently became chairman. Zwartepoorte became known as one of the pioneers in the Dutch reptile scene, owning and breeding turtles, and in 2008 owned around 90 turtles. At Blijdorp Zwartepoorte set up large breeding facilities for endangered species. For one of the species being bred, the Cuvier's dwarf caiman, Zwartepoorte would quack to hatchlings still in the egg, indicating it was safe to emerge. In 2011 he managed to breed Komodo dragons at the zoo. As his last position in Blijdorp he was curator of reptiles and amphibians. After a critically endangered Kemp's ridley sea turtle beached in Westenschouwen in 2009, the turtle was nursed back to health in Blijdorp. Zwartepoorte and others wrote an article on the happening. Zwartepoorte retired from Blijdorp in 2014. In 2015, the breeding facilities he helped set up at Blijdorp, were closed in a reorganisation. Zwartepoorte then founded the Stichting ReHerp, a foundation for the breeding of highly endangered reptiles.

Zwartepoorte died on 28 October 2016 in Litchfield National Park, at the age of 67, shortly after arriving for holidays in Australia. He was cremated in Australia. He left a wife.

== Conservation ==
Zwartepoorte underheld a large network of connections in area of conservation, biology and turtle care. As part of his network he was long-time chairman of the Nederlands-Belgische Schildpadden Vereniging. Zwartepoorte also served as chairman of the Turtle Survival Alliance Europe and was a member of the reptilians and amphibians working group of the Platform Verantwoord Huisdierenbezit. Zwartepoorte was immersed in conservation projects worldwide. He also was involved in replacing turtles that were impounded by authorities around the world. After a large impoundment of around 10,000 turtles in China in December 2001 Zwartepoorte travelled to the region and ensured that approximately 1000 turtles were sent to the Netherlands, checked, treated and redistributed among zoos and private studbook keepers. In 2004, while commenting on a seizure of 112 radiated tortoises that were moved to Blijdorp Zwartepoorte noted that the demand for tortoises in China for both consumption as well as for ownership as luxury goods was on the rise. In 2008 he was involved for Blijdorp with efforts to save frog species after a call by the International Union for Conservation of Nature (IUCN) was made to American and European zoos to capture and breed wild populations. He travelled to the Durrell Wildlife Conservation Trust on Jersey to obtain training. In 2013, commenting on the popularity of the herpetologist Freek Vonk, he stated that animal shelters were full of abandoned reptiles.

The Dutch Studbook Foundation was started by Zwartepoorte in 1994. He subsequently encouraged breeding programmes in other countries, which led to the organisation of more studbooks. These actions culminated in the creation of the European Studbook Foundation (ESF) in 2003. Zwartepoorte became president and remained in this position until 1 January 2016. During his time in office he fostered closer relations with the European Association of Zoos and Aquaria and the ESF, culminating in a memorandum of understanding, which strengthened bonds between zoos and private owners of amphibians and reptiles. He also introduced the use of DNA research in breeding programmes. Within the ESF he was studbook keeper of eight species, including the Kleinmann's tortoise and Testudo graeca graeca in which he was especially interested. He was co-studbook keeper of another 10 species to give advice and help.

In 2017 he received the 5th Posthumous Award of the IUCN Species Survival Commission Tortoise and Freshwater Turtle Specialist Group for "His major lifelong contributions to the conservation and biology of turtles and tortoises, and in honor and appreciation of his leadership and commitment to Turtle Survival Alliance Europe and the Turtle Conservation Fund".
