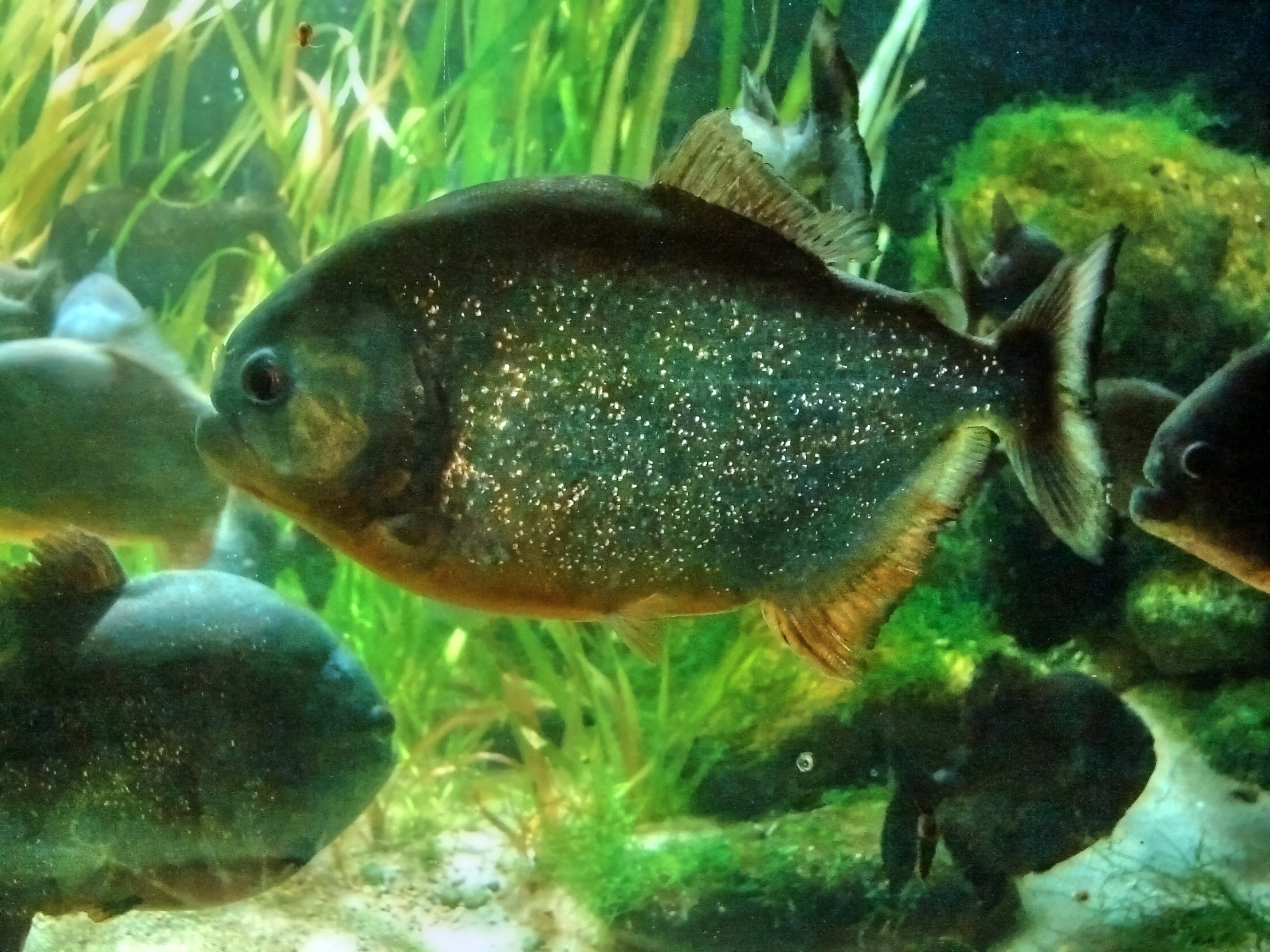

Conservation status
- Least Concern (IUCN 3.1)

Scientific classification
- Kingdom: Animalia
- Phylum: Chordata
- Class: Actinopterygii
- Order: Characiformes
- Family: Serrasalmidae
- Genus: Pygocentrus
- Species: P. piraya

Binomial name
- Pygocentrus piraya (Cuvier, 1819)

Synonyms
- Serrasalmus piraya Cuvier, 1819; Serrasalmo piranha Spix & Agassiz, 1829; Serrasalmo ferox Swainson, 1838

= Pygocentrus piraya =

Species of fish

Pygocentrus piraya, often called the piraya piranha or San Francisco piranha, and sometimes sold as the man-eating piranha, is a species of freshwater ray-finned fish belonging to the family Serrasalmidae, which includes the pacus, piranhas and related fishes. This fish is found in the São Francisco River basin in Brazil.

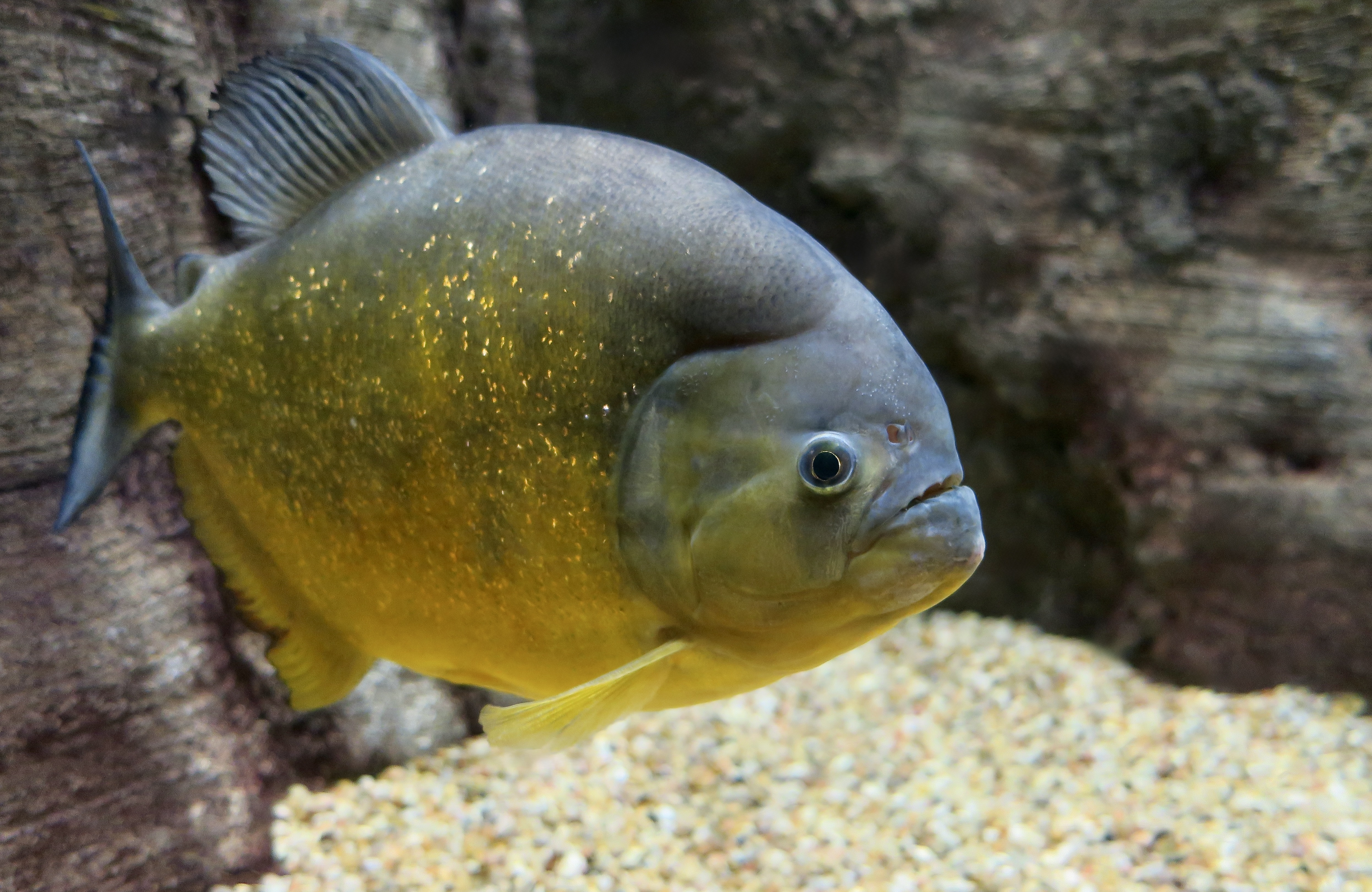
A São Francisco piranha at OdySea Aquarium.

== Description ==
It is one of the largest piranhas, reaching a maximum length of 50 cm in the wild, and is sometimes considered the most beautiful, with its orange to yellow belly coloration, silver eyes, and rayed fibrous adipose fin. Like most other piranhas, P. piraya is laterally compressed and roughly circular in profile, and bears a mouthful of very sharp teeth. The lower jaw is thick, strong, and protruding.

== Names ==
It is known by many vernacular names, such as Rio São Francisco piranha, black-tailed piranha, and king emperor piranha, and locally it is simply termed piraya.

== Diet ==
This fish is an omnivore, and has aggressive tendencies when hungry, stressed, or seeking live food. Like most in the Serrasalmidae family, piraya piranhas dental morphology has a major influence for their inclination toward piscivorous and herbivorous behavior. Members of this genus bear one row of sharp, triangular teeth with a strong lower jaw, which enable them to slice and mince prey with ease. This characteristic combined with its large size make it a danger to humans. Piranha attacks on humans are anecdotal for the most part. The piranha mostly prefers to eat small fish and insects, along with seeds and aquatic plant material. The pygocentrus piraya plays a key role in their ecosystem by regulating the population of other fish

== In captivity ==
The piraya is sometimes available as an aquarium fish. It is not generally bred in captivity, so aquarium pirayas are usually imported from South America and can be expensive. Any other fish sharing a tank with a piraya should be of the same or a similar piranha species. Other types of fish will be attacked and eaten.
