= Provenierswijk =

Coordinates: 51°55′38″N 4°28′07″E

- Neighborhood of Rotterdam
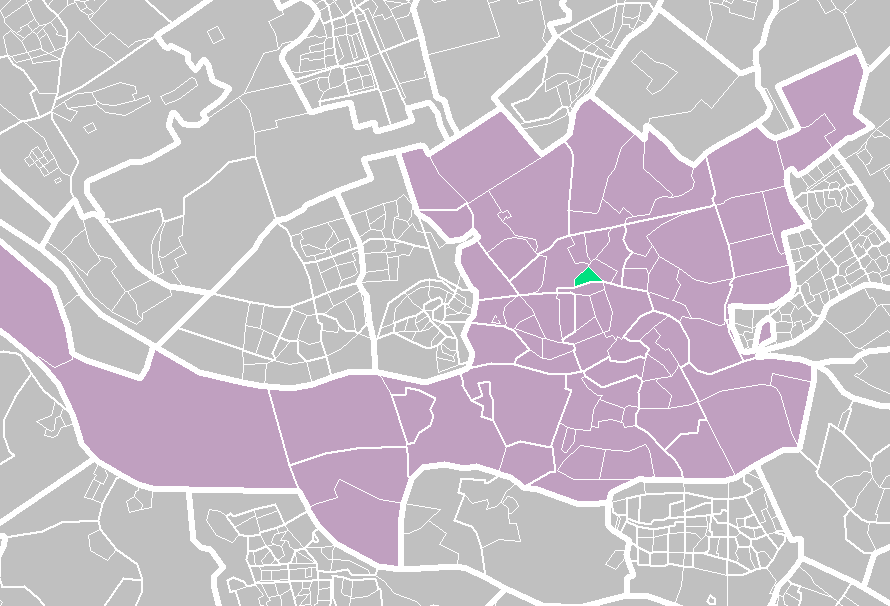
- Interactive map of Provenierswijk
- Country: Netherlands
- Province: South Holland
- COROP: Rotterdam
- Borough: Noord
- Time zone: UTC+1 (CET)

Provenierswijk is a neighborhood of Rotterdam, Netherlands.
