= Diergaarde Blijdorp =

Zoo in the northwestern Rotterdam, Nederlands

Diergaarde Blijdorp Rotterdam Zoo
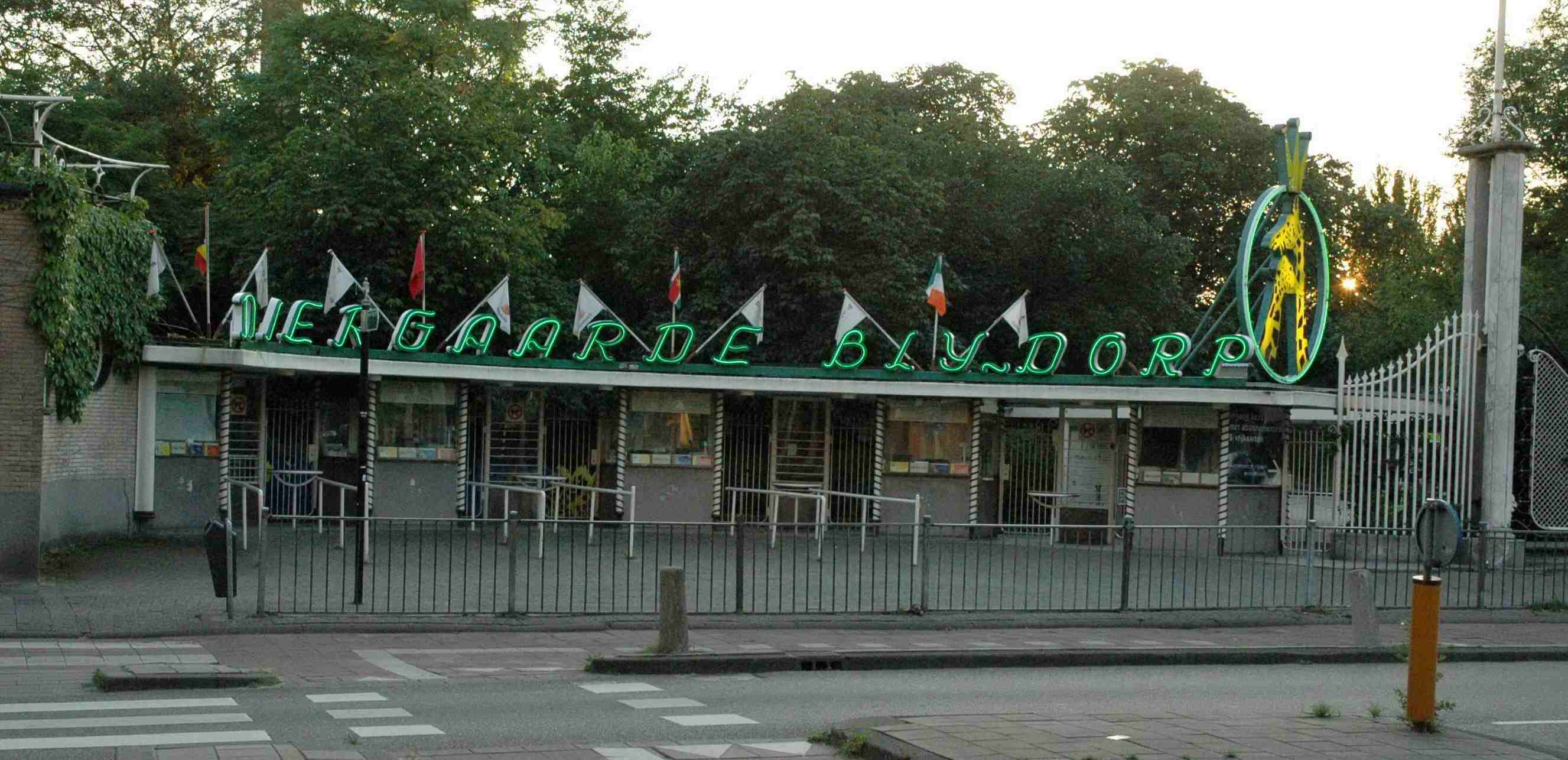
- Old entrance of the Diergaarde in Blijdorp
- Interactive map of Diergaarde Blijdorp; Rotterdam Zoo
- 51.9269605°N 4.4481325°E
- Date opened: May 18, 1857; 169 years ago
- Location: Blijdorp, Rotterdam, Netherlands
- Land area: Approx. 34 ha (84 acres)
- No. of animals: 16.671 (1 October 2023)
- No. of species: 562 (1 October 2023)
- Annual visitors: 1.5 million (20 December 2019)
- Memberships: NVD, EAZA, WAZA, IABES, SNP
- Website: diergaardeblijdorp.nl

Diergaarde Blijdorp (Dutch pronunciation: [ˈdiːrˌɣaːrdə ˈblɛidɔr(ə)p]; lit. 'Blijdorp Zoo'), officially Rotterdam Zoo, is a zoo located in the northwestern part of Rotterdam. It is one of the oldest zoos in the Netherlands, and has been operated by the Stichting Koninklijke Rotterdamse Diergaarde ("Royal Rotterdam Zoo Foundation"). Divided into several zoogeographic regions, the 34-hectare (84-acre) Blijdorp Zoo boasts 562 species. It also has a shop, multiple cafes, and an information centre.

The zoo is a member of the Dutch Zoo Federation and the European Association of Zoos and Aquaria. In 2007, it celebrated its 150th anniversary.

== History ==
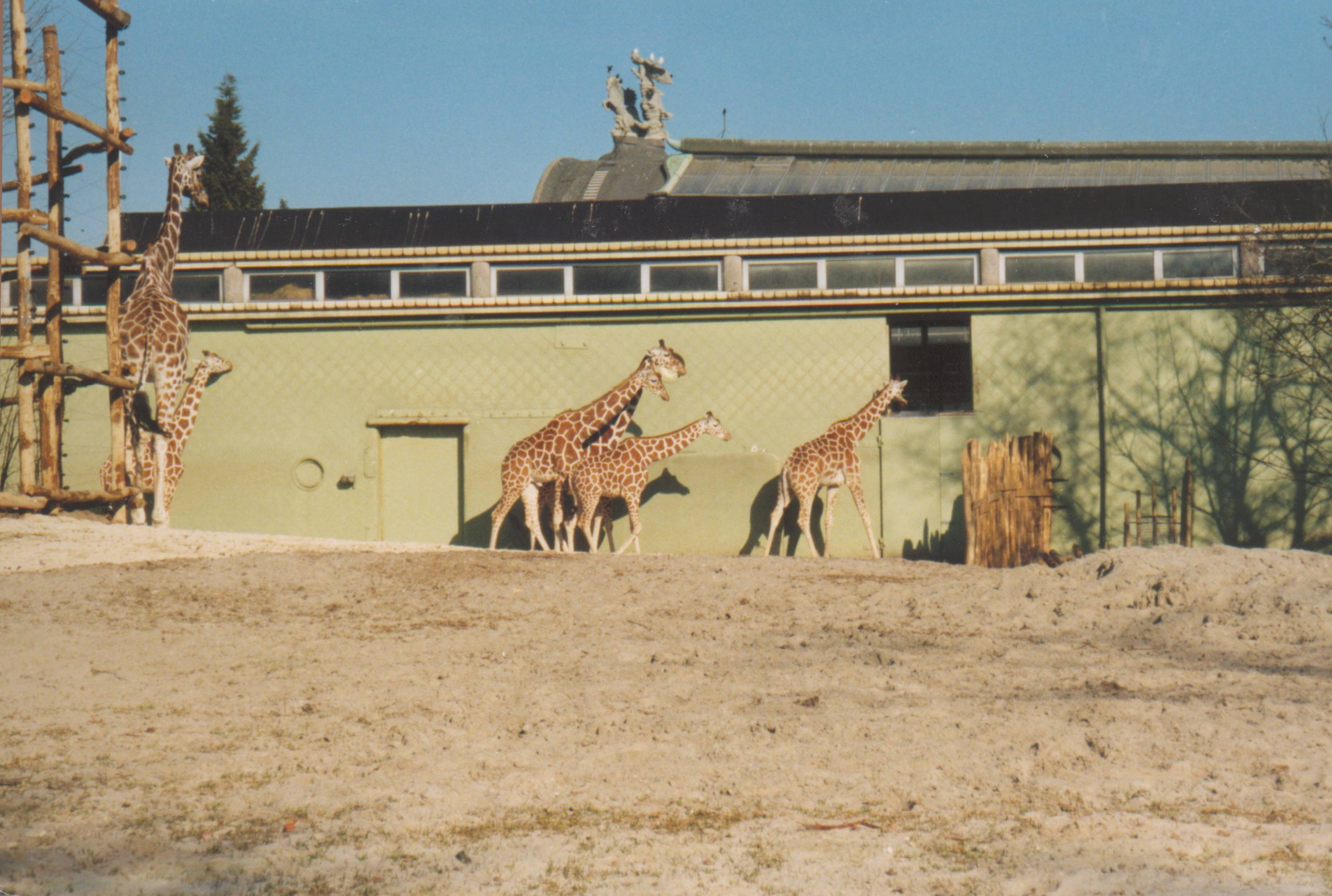
Giraffes and monumental building

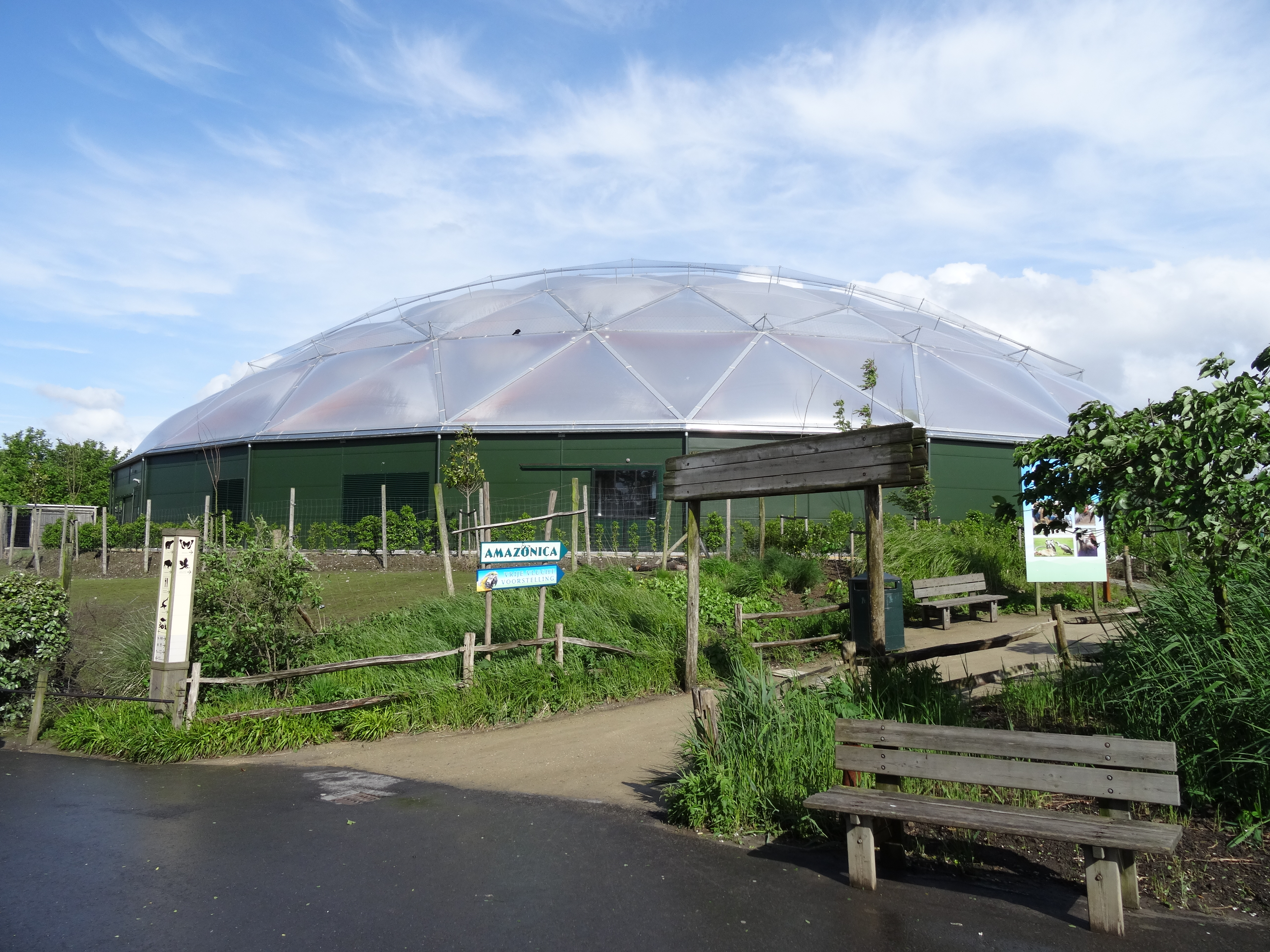
Amazonica, Diergaarde Blijdorp, Outside view

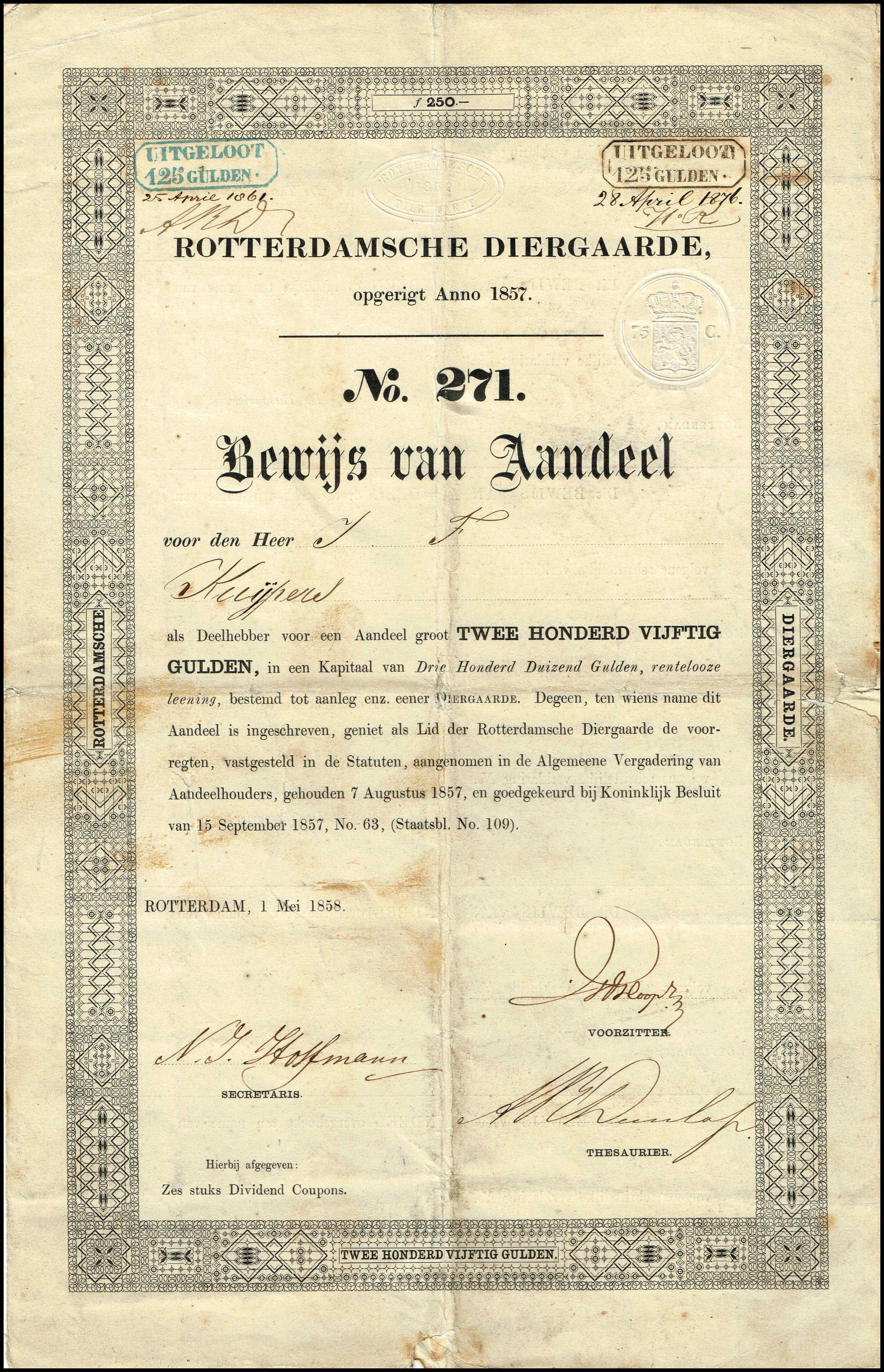
Share of the Rotterdamsche Diergaarde, issued 1 May 1858

In 1855, a garden was set up for pheasants and waterfowl in the center of Rotterdam, near the Kruiskade. It was a success and on May 18, 1857, the 'Rotterdamsche Diergaarde' was opened as a sequel. The first director was the animal trainer Henri Martin. The same year the 'Vereniging Rotterdamsche Diergaarde' was founded. In 1932 it was decided to reorganize the zoo. In 1937 it was decided to move the zoo to a new location. The zoo exchanged land with the municipality: the municipality received part of the old zoo for free, the rest they had to pay for. In exchange, the zoo became the owner of two-thirds of a new 13-hectare (32-acre) site in the Blijdorp district, while one-third of the new site had to be leased at one guilder. On October 26, 1938, the 'Vereniging' was dissolved, and the 'Rotterdamsche Diergaarde Foundation' was established. The Rotterdam Zoo moved to its new location prior to the bombing of Rotterdam in World War II, which destroyed most of the city centre. The original zoo had been heavily damaged in a bombing two days prior to the Blitz, but it had not been touched by the main bombardment on May 14, 1940. Some street names, such as Diergaardesingel (‘Zoo Lane’), still recall the old zoo. The new zoo at Blijdorp was rebuilt slightly to the north, where it opened to the public in its current location on December 7, 1940. The new zoo was designed by Dutch architect Sybold van Ravesteyn, who designed the central railway station of Rotterdam as well. In 2001, Blijdorp became almost twice as large when it opened a new western part, which includes the Oceanium aquarium. In 2007, the zoo was declared a rijksmonument.

In May 2007, the zoo appeared in the news when Bokito, Blijdorp's silverback gorilla, escaped from his enclosure and seriously injured a female visitor. Before the attack, the woman was a regular visitor of the zoo (on average 4 times per week) and claimed to have a special bond with Bokito, regularly touching the glass between her and the gorilla, making eye contact with him and smiling at him.

In October 2010, the city of Rotterdam decided to reduce its yearly funding of Blijdorp from nearly €4.5 million to about €0.8 million until 2015. The zoo and its supporters protested the decision, claiming it is unclear if the zoo can continue to operate with the reduced budget.

In March 2014, the zoo made headlines when a giraffe licked a former zoo cleaner whose last wish was to revisit the zoo, as he was dying of terminal brain cancer. The video went viral worldwide quickly.

In 2019, a conservation centre (Dutch:Natuurbehoudscentrum) was opened with the first animals being Lesser Antillean iguanas brought over from a plane from Sint Maarten with Dutch prime minister Mark Rutte.

== Breeding programs ==
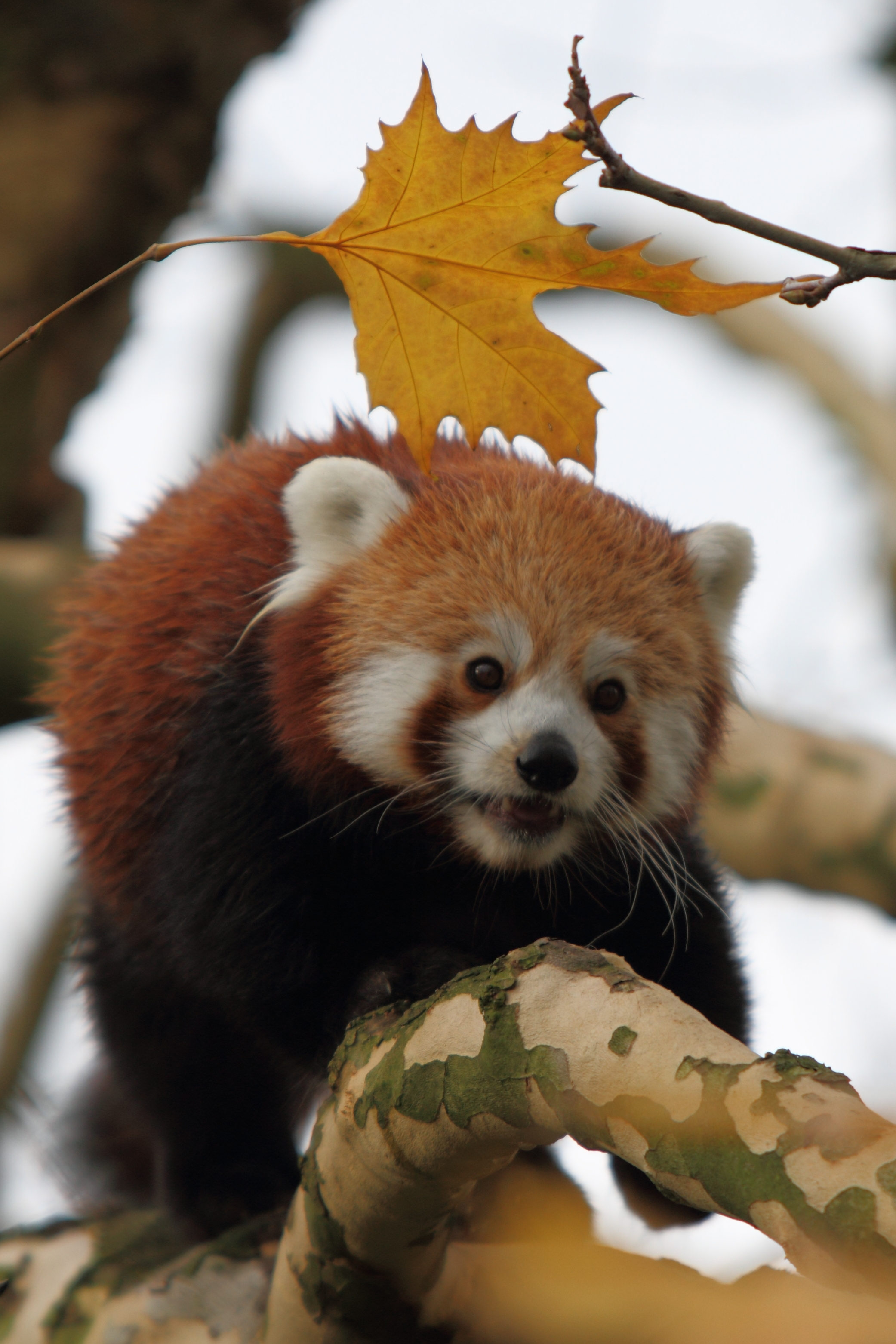
A red panda (Ailurus fulgens fulgens) in the zoo, which coordinates the international breeding program for this species

Diergaarde Blijdorp participates in about 70 breeding programs and studbooks, and coordinates a number of these, including the international breeding program for red pandas, EEPs for Asian elephant, Komodo dragon, red-crowned and Siberian crane, Visayan warty pig and Egyptian tortoise, and the ESB (European Studbook) for the crowned pigeons.

== Botanical garden ==
Blijdorp also houses a botanical garden and manages both the Dutch National Bromelia Collection and the Dutch National Primula Collection.

== Oceanium ==
The Oceanium is an aquarium that opened in the zoo in 2001. The Oceanium lies in the expansion area of the zoo, which includes a new entrance and parking area, and was the biggest project to date for the zoo. The area around the Oceanium was home to projects depicting the Americas. However since 2020, Blijdorp wanted to designate this area to tropical Africa.

== Animal list ==
=== Asia ===
Chinese Garden

- Tufted deer (Elaphodus cephalophus)
- François' langur (Trachypithecus francoisi)
- Eurasian otter (Lutra lutra)

The Amur

- Greater flamingo (Phoenicopterus roseus)
- White stork (Ciconia ciconia)
- Amur leopard (Panthera pardus orientalis)
- Northern hawk-owl (Surnia ulula)
- Dalmatian pelican (Pelecanus crispus)
- Great cormorant (Phalacrocorax carbo)

Malaysian Forest Edge & Asia House

- Visayan warty pig (Sus cebifrons)
- Visayan spotted deer (Cervus alfredi)
- Lion-tailed macaque (Macaca silenus)
- Fishing cat (Prionailurus viverrinus)
- Banteng (Bos javanicus)
- Blackbuck (Antilope cervicapra)
- Wreathed hornbill (Aceros undulatus)
- Indian eagle-owl (Bubo bengalensis)
- Bali myna (Leucopsar rothschildi)
- Crested partridge (Rollulus rouloul)
- Black-naped fruit dove (Ptilinopus melanospilus)
- Roti Island snake-necked turtle (Chelodina mccordi)
- Amboina box turtle (Cuora amboinensis)
- Komodo dragon (Varanus komodoensis)
- Indian cobra (Naja naja)

Asian Swamp

- White-naped crane (Grus vipio)
- Demoiselle crane (Anthropoides virgo)
- Sulawesi crested macaque (Macaca nigra)
- Little egret (Egretta garzetta)
- Black-headed ibis (Threskiornis melanocephalus)
- Painted stork (Mycteria leucocephala)
- Milky stork (Mycteria cinerea)
- Woolly-necked stork (Ciconia episcopus)
- Black-crowned night heron (Nycticorax nycticorax)
- Pied imperial pigeon (Ducula bicolor)
- Fulvous whistling duck (Dendrocygna bicolor)
- Green peafowl (Pavo muticus)

Mongolian Steppe

- Bactrian camel (Camelus bactrianus)
- Pallas's cat (Otocolobus manul)

Taman Indah

- Indian rhinoceros (Rhinoceros unicornis)
- Asian elephant (Elephas maximus)
- Indian python (Python molurus)
- Malayan tapir (Tapirus indicus)

Tiger Creek

- Sumatran tiger (Panthera tigris sondaica)

Other animals

- Red panda (Ailurus fulgens fulgens)

=== Europe ===
- Finnish forest reindeer (Rangifer tarandus fennicus)

=== Africa ===
Gorilla exhibit

- Western lowland gorilla (Gorilla gorilla gorilla)
- Black and rufous elephant shrew (Rhynchocyon petersi)

Congo

- Crested guinea fowl (Guttera pucherani)
- Guinea turaco (Tauraco persa)
- Okapi (Okapia johnstoni)
- Red river hog (Potamochoerus porcus)
- Eastern bongo (Tragelaphus eurycerus isaaci)
- Northern carmine bee-eater (Merops nubicus)
- Several other bird species

Savanna

- Reticulated giraffe (Giraffa camelopardalis reticulata)
- Chapman's zebra (Equus quagga chapmani)
- Greater kudu (Tragelaphus strepsiceros)
- Common ostrich (Struthio camelus)
- Marabou stork (Leptoptilos crumeniferus)
- Hamerkop (Scopus umbretta)
- Grey crowned crane (Balearica regulorum)
- White-backed vulture (Gyps africanus)
- Rüppell's vulture (Gyps rueppellii)
- White-headed vulture (Trigonoceps occipitalis)
- Hooded vulture (Necrosyrtes monachus)
- Spotted hyena (Crocuta crocuta)
- Serval (Leptailurus serval)
- Yellow mongoose (Cynictis penicillata)
- Black-headed weaver (Ploceus melanocephalus)

Crocodile river
(opened 2008)

- Nile crocodile (Crocodylus niloticus)
- West African slender-snouted crocodile (Crocodylus cataphractus)
- Sudan plated lizard (Broadleysaurus major)
- African spurred tortoise (Geochelone sulcata)
- Pancake tortoise (Malacochersus tornieri)
- Rock hyrax (Procavia capensis)

Others

- Western plantain-eater (Crinifer piscator)
- Superb starling (Lamprotornis superbus)
- Crowned lapwing (Vanellus coronatus)
- Pygmy hippopotamus (Hexaprotodon liberiensis)
- Black rhinoceros (Diceros bicornis)
- Mhorr gazelle (Nanger dama mhorr)
- Gelada (Theropithecus gelada)

=== Rivièrahal ===
- Toco toucan (Ramphastos toco)

=== South America ===
- Vicuña (Vicugna vicugna)
- Darwin's rhea (Rhea pennata)
- Southern pudu (Pudu puda)

=== North America ===
Prairie

- Plains bison (Bison bison bison)
- Black-tailed prairie dog (Cynomys ludovicianus)

Arctica

- Polar bear (Ursus maritimus)
- Arctic fox (Vulpes lagopus)
- Steller's sea eagle (Haliaeetus pelagicus)
- Raccoon (Procyon lotor)

=== Oceanium ===
Bass Rock

- Atlantic puffin (Fratercula arctica)
- Common guillemot (Uria aalge)
- Black-legged kittiwake (Rissa tridactyla)
- Common eider (Somateria mollissima)

North Sea

- European lobster (Homarus gammarus)
- Nursehound (Scyliorhinus stellaris)
- Small-spotted catshark (Scyliorhinus canicula)
- Blonde ray (Raja brachyura)
- Thornback ray (Raja clavata)
- Herring (Clupeus harengus)
- Atlantic mackerel (Scomber scombrus)
- Thicklip grey mullet (Chelon labrosus)
- Different species of wrasse

Atlantic Ocean

- Nurse shark (Ginglymostoma cirratum)
- Green sea turtle (Chelonia mydas)
- Hawksbill sea turtle (Eretmochelys imbricata)
- Southern stingray (Dasyatis americana)
- Great barracuda (Sphyraena barracuda)
- Atlantic tarpon (Megalops atlanticus)

Caribbean

- Green moray eel (Gymnothorax funebris)
- Scribbled filefish (Aluterus scriptus)
- Slender seahorse (Hippocampus reidi)

The Antilles

- Desmarest's hutia (Capromys pilorides)
- Plumed basilisk (Basiliscus plumifrons)
- Red-bellied piranha (Pygocentrus nattereri)
- Black pacu (Colossoma macropomum)
- Cuvier's dwarf caiman (Paleosuchus palpebrosus)
- Cownose ray (Rhinoptera bonasus)

Falklands

- King penguin (Aptenodytes patagonica)
- Gentoo penguin (Pygoscelis papua)

Galápagos

- Galapagos giant tortoise (Geochelone nigra)

Sea of Cortez

- Gila monster (Heloderma suspectum)
- Colorado River toad (Bufo alvarius)
- Fire salamander (Salamandra salamandra)
- Fish

=== Other animals ===
- Asiatic lion (Panthera leo persica)
- Meerkat (Suricata suricatta)
- Swamp wallaby (Wallabia bicolor)

== See also ==
- Henk Zwartepoorte
