= European Studbook Foundation =

The European Studbook Foundation is an initiative for promoting and maintaining studbooks of reptiles and amphibians in captivity.

Founded as O.O.S in 1997 in the Netherlands, it changed to ESF in 2003. Henk Zwartepoorte served as chairman from its inception in 2003 until 2016.

== Aims ==
1. Conservation of reptiles and amphibians in captivity, with emphasis on endangered species.
2. Management of European studbooks.
3. Management of genetically healthy breeding programmes.
4. Cooperation with re-introduction programmes.
5. Gathering, compiling and spreading of knowledge of husbandry and reproduction of reptiles and amphibians.
