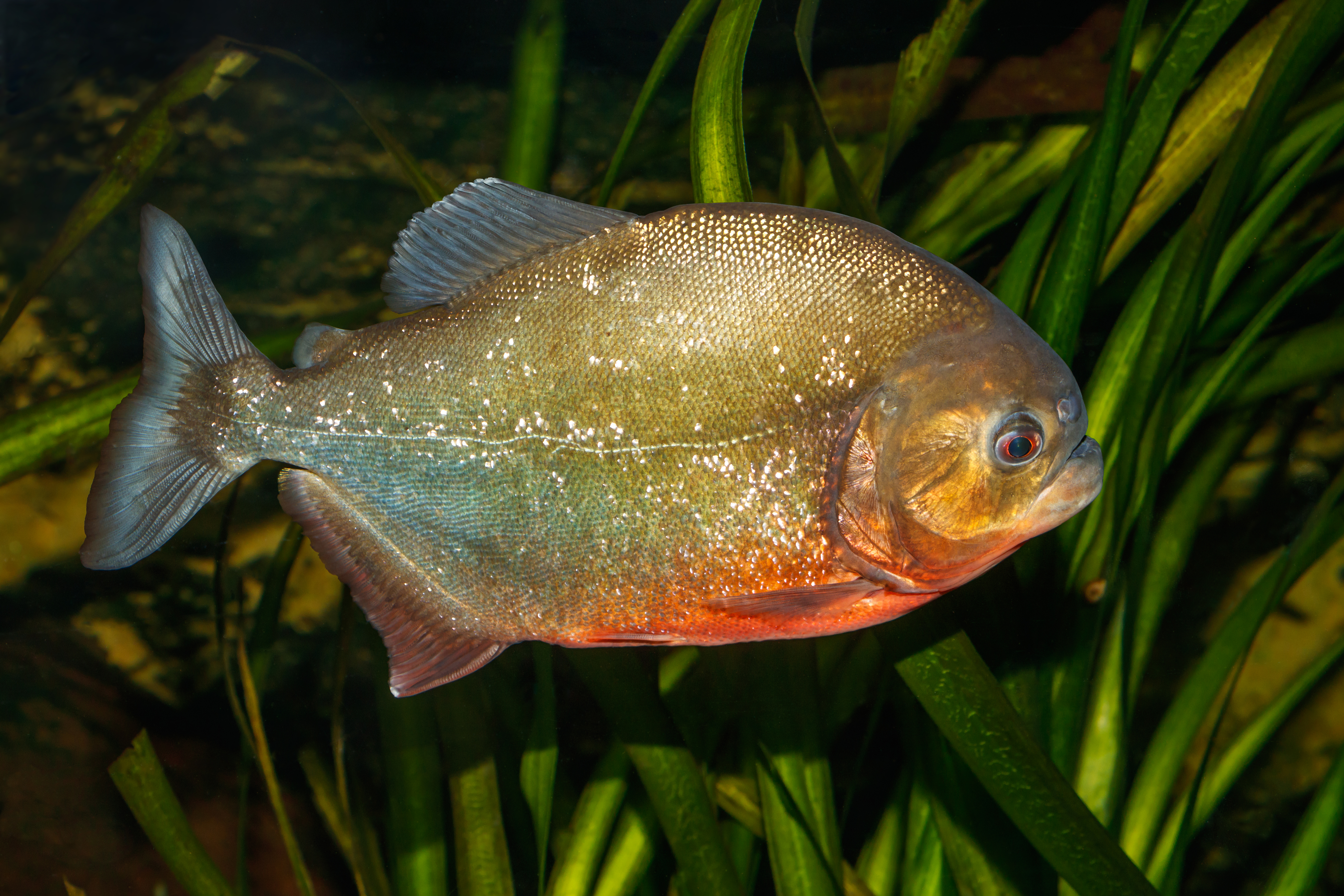
- Karlsruhe Zoo, Germany

Conservation status
- Least Concern (IUCN 3.1)

Scientific classification
- Kingdom: Animalia
- Phylum: Chordata
- Class: Actinopterygii
- Division: Teleostei
- Order: Characiformes
- Family: Serrasalmidae
- Genus: Pygocentrus
- Species: P. nattereri

Binomial name
- Pygocentrus nattereri (Kner, 1858)

Synonyms
- Serrasalmus nattereri (Kner, 1858); Pygocentrus altus Gill, 1870; Serrasalmo (Pygocentrus) ternetzi Steindachner, 1908; Serrasalmus ternetzi Steindachner 1908

= Red-bellied piranha =

Fish species native to South America

The red-bellied piranha, also known as the red piranha (Pygocentrus nattereri), is a species of freshwater ray-finned fish belonging to the family Serrasalmidae, which includes the pacus, piranhas and related fishes. The red-bellied piranha occurs in South America, found in the Amazon, Paraguay, Paraná and Essequibo basins, as well as coastal rivers of northeastern Brazil. This fish is locally abundant in its freshwater habitat.

They are carnivorous foragers and feed on insects, worms, crustaceans and fish. As opportunistic feeders, they will also take advantage of edible aquatic plants as well as any fruits, nuts or seeds that may fall into the waters. They are not a migratory species but do travel to seek out conditions conducive to breeding and spawning during periods of increased rainfall. Red-bellied piranhas often travel in shoals as a predatory defense but rarely exhibit group hunting behavior. Acoustic communication is common and is sometimes exhibited along with aggressive behaviors. They are a popular aquarium fish.

== Etymology ==
The fish's binomial name is named after Johann Natterer.

== Taxonomy and phylogeny ==
The red-bellied piranha belongs to the family Serrasalmidae, which is a group of medium to large-sized characids and includes other closely related omnivores such as pacus. They are characterized by deep, lateral compressed bodies and long dorsal fins. Within the family, red-bellied piranhas are classified in the genus Pygocentrus, which is distinguished by the unusual dentition and differing head width dimensions. The red-bellied piranha is often thought of as highly carnivorous, while most other fish that are not piranhas in the family are primarily herbivorous. However, the red-bellied piranha is actually omnivorous.

== Distribution and habitat ==
The red-bellied piranha is distributed widely throughout the South American continent and is found in the Neotropical rivers of Argentina, Brazil, Bolivia, Colombia, Ecuador, Guyana, Suriname, Paraguay, Peru, Uruguay, and Venezuela. They live in the warm freshwater drainages of several major rivers including the Amazon, Paraguay, Paraná, and Essequibo, as well as numerous smaller systems. They can live in waters that are between 15 and 35 °C (59–95 °F) but are able to survive temperatures as low as 10 °C (50 °F) for a period. They are mainly found in whitewater, but have also been recorded in blackwater and clearwater. The red-bellied piranha live in major rivers, streams, lakes (such as oxbows and artificial lakes formed by dams), floodplains, and flooded forests. They were introduced to China, probably by the aquarium trade. First detected in 1990 they have since become invasive in the country.

No piranha is found in the United States including this one. In 1998 a single specimen was found in a lake in a golf course in Simi Valley, Ventura County, California. California and Washington prohibit P. nattereri and encourage surveillance to prevent its introduction.

== Description ==
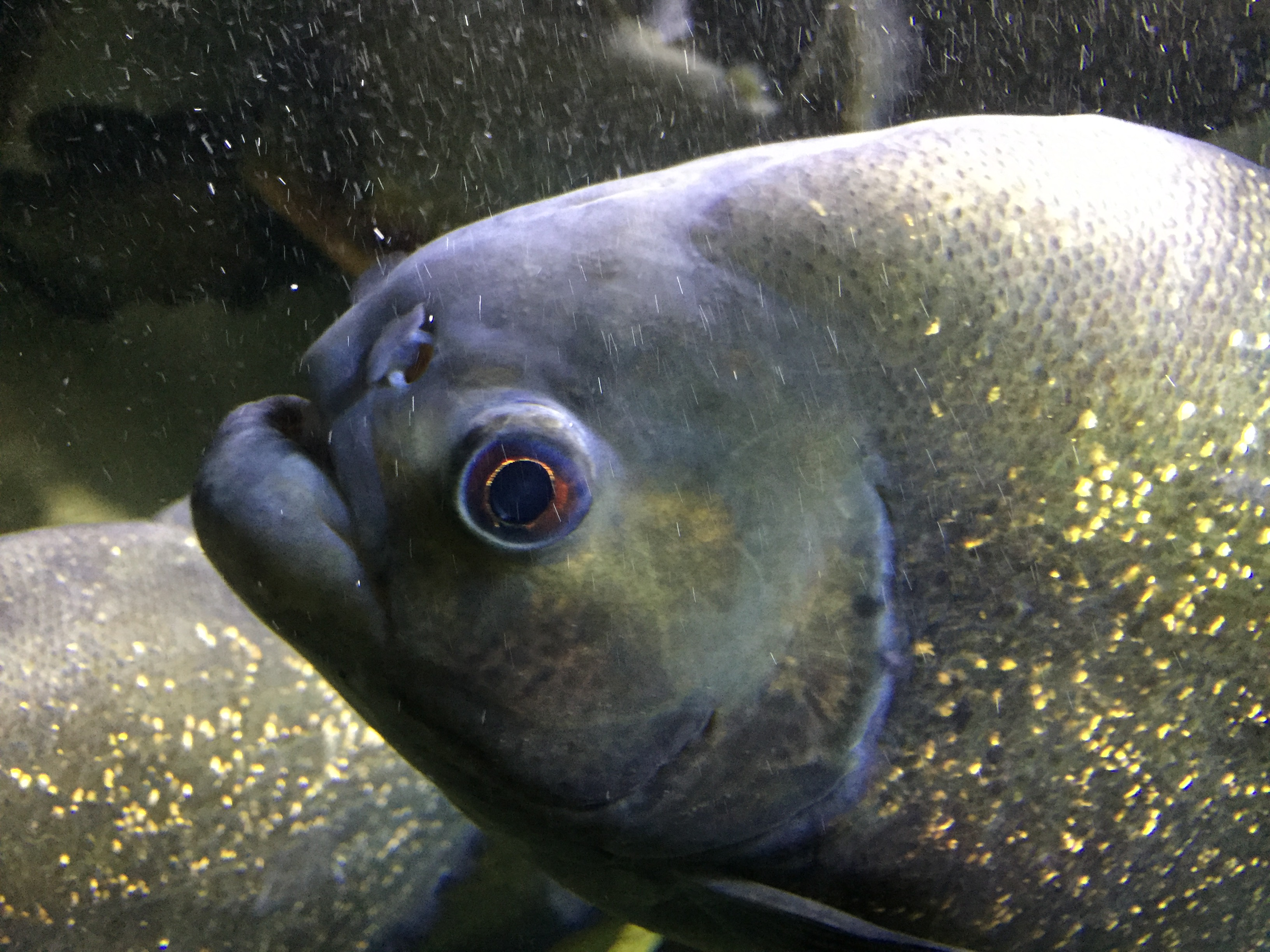
Pairi Daiza

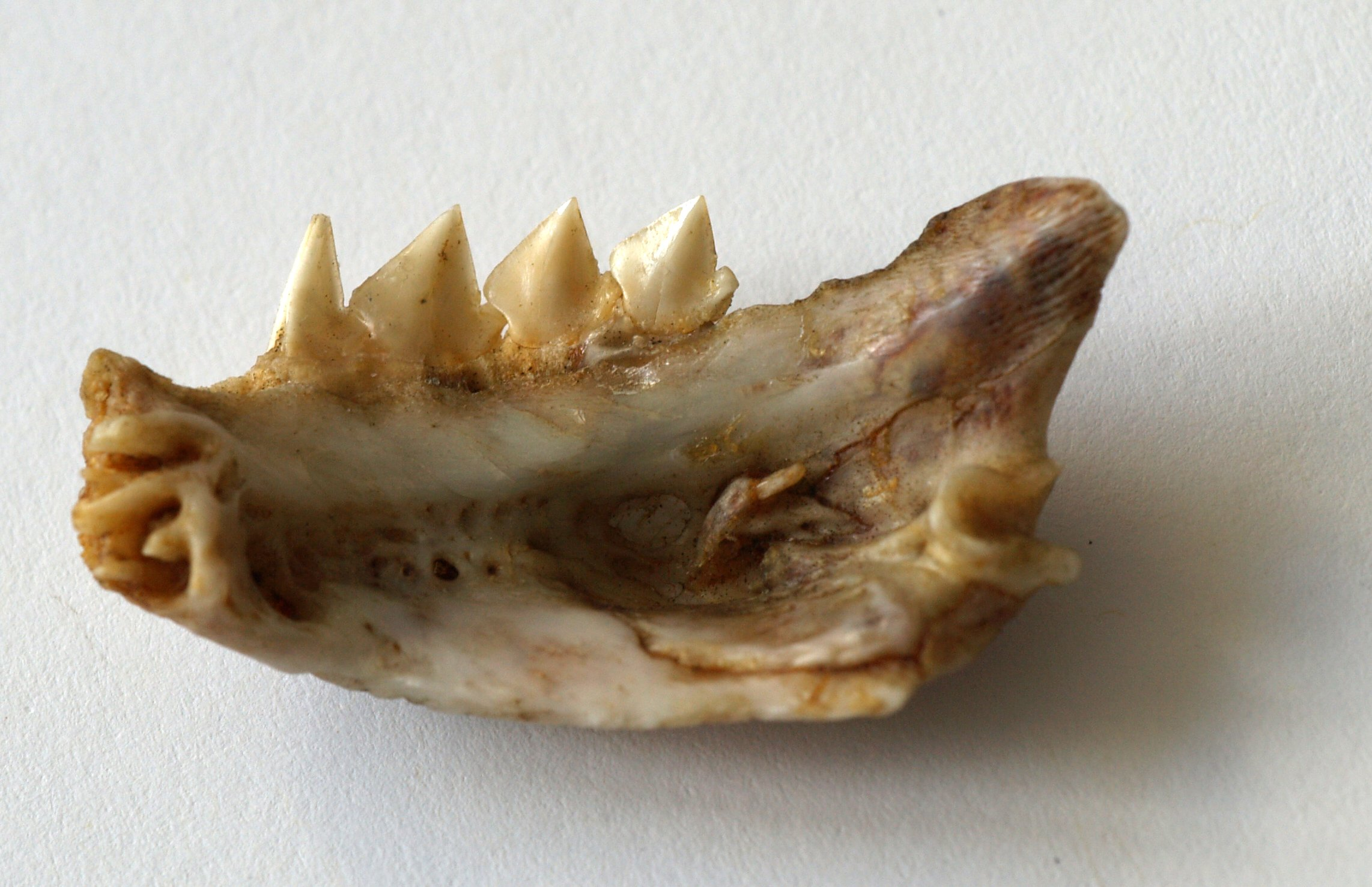
Jaw bone with razor-shape teeth in Cologne Zoo

The red-bellied piranha has a popular reputation as a ferocious predator, despite being primarily a scavenger. As their name suggests, red-bellied piranhas have a reddish tinge to the belly when fully grown, although juveniles are a silver color with darker spots. The species can reach up to 3.9 kg (8 lb 10 oz) in weight and 50 cm (20 in) in standard length but rarely surpass 35 cm (14 in). The rest of the body is often grey with silver-flecked scales. Sometimes, blackish spots appear behind the gills and the anal fin is usually black at the base. The pectoral and pelvic fins may vary from red to orange. Females can be distinguished from males by the slightly deeper red color of their bellies.

The red-bellied piranha is typically found in white water rivers, such as the Amazon River Basin, and in some streams and lakes. Sometimes, they may inhabit flooded forests such as those found in the Brazilian Amazon. They live in shoals but do not group hunt, although they may occasionally enter into feeding frenzies. In the case of a feeding frenzy, schools of piranha will converge on one large prey individual and eat it within minutes. These attacks are usually extremely rare and are due to provocation or starvation. Breeding occurs over a two-month period during the rainy season, but that can vary by area. Females will lay around 5,000 eggs on newly submerged vegetation in nests that are built by the males.

A significant amount of lore regarding the ferocity of the red-bellied piranha can be traced to President Theodore Roosevelt following the completion of the Roosevelt-Rondon Scientific Expedition. The former president returned with dramatic stories of an entire cow being devoured to the bones within a matter of a few minutes. This event was later found to be staged by local guides, eager to provide Roosevelt with a spectacle worthy of the journey. It later surfaced the fish had been corralled and starved for over a week, into a section of the river, into which the unfortunate cow was driven for the event. There is nothing to suggest Roosevelt was ever aware of this fact.

== Behavior ==
Rostock Zoo

Pygocentrus nattereri encompasses a larger geographic area than any other piranha species, covering much of the Neotropical region. When red-bellied piranhas are introduced to other parts of the American continent, there are usually negative consequences for the local fish fauna, partially due to its generally aggressive behavior. This aggressive behavior is sometimes marked by the acoustic sounds they produce.

The red-bellied piranha is not a migratory species but does search for conditions conducive to reproduction during seasons of increased rainfall. Red-bellied piranhas are omnivores and primarily foragers. They feed on insects, fish, plants, and organic debris. Bechara et al., 1996 finds P. nattereri is almost immune to gas bubble disease which is devastating to almost all fish in the same environment.

=== Diet and feeding behavior ===
The typical diet of red-bellied piranhas is omnivorous including fruit, leaves, insects, mollusks, carrion and fish. In packs up to hundreds, piranhas have been known to feed on animals as large as egrets or capybara. Despite the piranha's reputation as a dangerous carnivore, it is actually primarily a scavenger and forager, and will mainly eat plants and insects during the rainy season when food is abundant. They also tend to feed only on weak, injured, dying, or dead animals in the wild. Red-bellied piranhas do not stay in groups in order to pack-hunt for larger animals, but instead group for protection against predators.

Foraging methods vary throughout the different stages of a piranha's life. Smaller fish will search for food during the day, while larger fish will forage at dawn, in the late afternoon, and in the early evening. Throughout the day, the fish lurk in dark areas and ambush their prey. The piranha may also catch prey by hunting and chasing, where it will lie hidden in the vegetation until its prey swims by. The piranha will then capture its prey. When scavenging, the piranha will eat a wide variety of food, ranging from pieces of debris, insects, snails, fish fins, scales, and plants.

=== Reproduction ===
The breeding habits of piranhas in nature are mostly unknown, with most spawning research being done in aquariums. Piranhas are usually able to breed by the time they are one year old. Female piranhas will lay several thousand eggs near water plants, onto which the eggs stick. The males then fertilize the eggs. After just two to three days the eggs will hatch, and the juvenile piranhas will hide in the plants until they are large enough to defend themselves, at which point hiding from predators becomes lurking for prey.

Research on red-bellied piranha breeding behavior in nature has revealed certain behavioral patterns around nesting sites. Adult piranhas will swim side-by-side in small circles, sometimes with two individuals swimming in opposite directions while keeping their ventral surfaces close to one another. Although this may appear to be a courtship display, a closer look reveals that the adults are actually defending nesting sites. The nests are about 4 to 5 centimetres (1 1/2 to 2 in) deep, and are dug among water grasses, with the eggs attached to the grasses and plant stems.

This formation of mating pairs, nuptial swimming displays, and guarding of the nests shows that red-bellied piranhas exhibit parental care for the nest and the young. When left unattended, other fish, such as characids, may prey upon the eggs. Despite the defensive practice of circling the nests, red-bellied piranhas are often passive toward other fish that approach the nest. It is possible that the mere presence of the piranha, a natural predator, provides enough of a threat to prevent potential predators from approaching the nest.

Piranhas have two annual reproductive seasons; these seasons are tied to water level fluctuations, the flooding pulse, temperature, and other hydrological conditions. When individuals are ready to become sexually active, they will lose their red coloration and select habitats that are conducive to spawning, such as flooded marginal grasses and vegetation within lakes. This habitat selection is a clear distinction from non-reproductive individuals that prefer open water and under floating meadows.

=== Shoaling ===
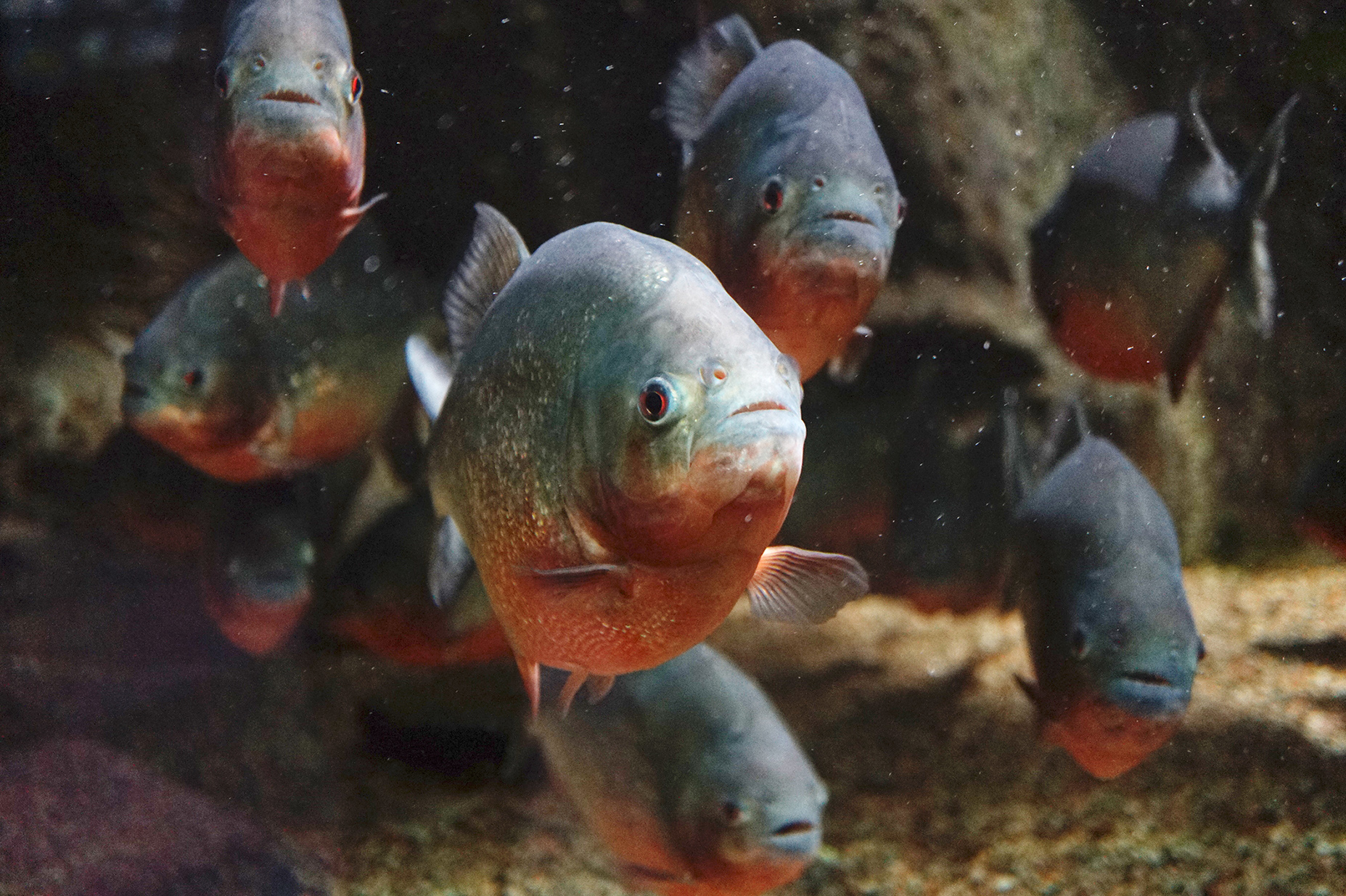
Särkänniemi Aquarium

Red-bellied piranhas often travel in shoals as a predatory defense, as well as for the offense. In studies that tested the piranhas' reactions to a simulated predator attack, resting opercular rates returned to normal more quickly among piranhas that were in shoals of eight rather than in shoals of two. Although it has been presumed that piranhas engage in pack-hunting behavior, no investigation shows that shoaling behavior among piranhas is used for cooperative hunting.

Most likely, this shoaling behavior is a defense against predation from larger animals such as dolphins, large piscivorous fish, caimans, and aquatic birds such as storks, herons, and anhingas. Piranhas will travel to their nesting sites in shoals in order to reduce the likelihood that any single individual will be attacked by a predator. Shoals of red-bellied piranha use the margins of flooded areas to build their nests.

=== Communication and signaling ===
Acoustic communication among red-bellied piranhas is exhibited along with aggressive behaviors, such as biting, chasing, conspecific confrontation, and fighting. The sounds created by piranhas are generated through rapid contractions of the sonic muscles and is associated with the swimbladder. The swimbladder may play an important role in sound production as a resonator. All of the observations made on sound production by red-bellied piranha have been when specimens were held by hand. When taken out of the water, the red-bellied piranha will emit a drumming-like sound, consisting of a low-frequency harmonic sound. However, research has shown the presence of three types of acoustic emissions that are associated with specific behaviors. Type one calls are made up of harmonic sounds, last approximately 140 milliseconds at 120 Hz, and are associated with frontal display behavior between two fish. Type two sounds last approximately 36 milliseconds at 40 Hz, and are associated with circling and fighting behavior related to food competition. Type three sounds are made up of a single pulse lasting just 3 milliseconds at 1740 Hz, and are highly associated with chasing behavior toward a conspecific individual. This same sound is also produced when an individual snaps its jaws to bite another individual.

Nearly all sounds produced by red-bellied piranhas are produced in the context of social interactions between individuals. The low, drumming sounds are typically produced during moderate attacks, while loud, threatened sounds are produced during more vigorous attacks.

== Conservation status ==
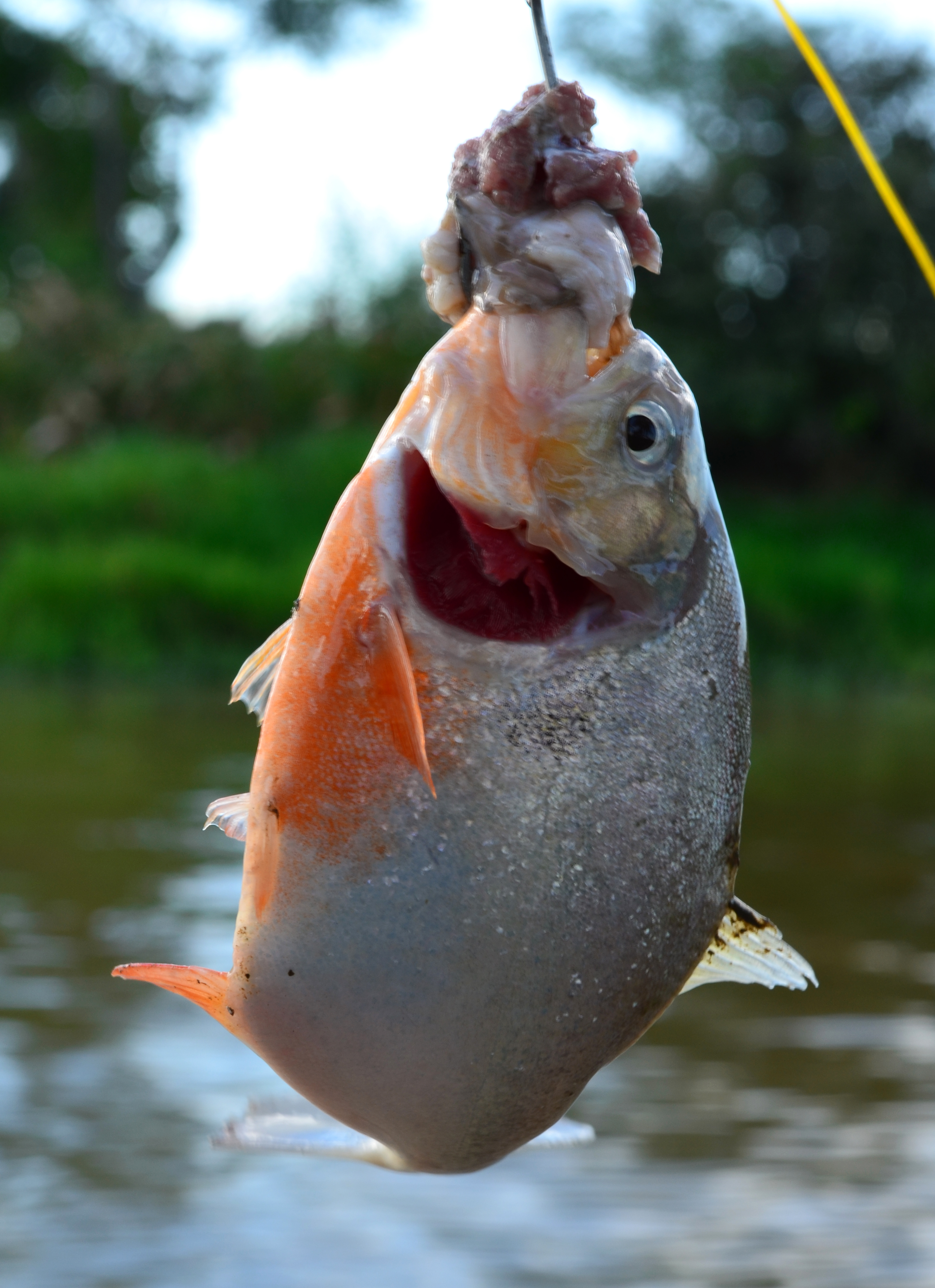

The red-bellied piranha is widespread and locally abundant. In some parts of its range, it is among the most common fish species. The collection and trade of the species to aquariums may locally present a low risk to the red-bellied piranha.

== In the media ==
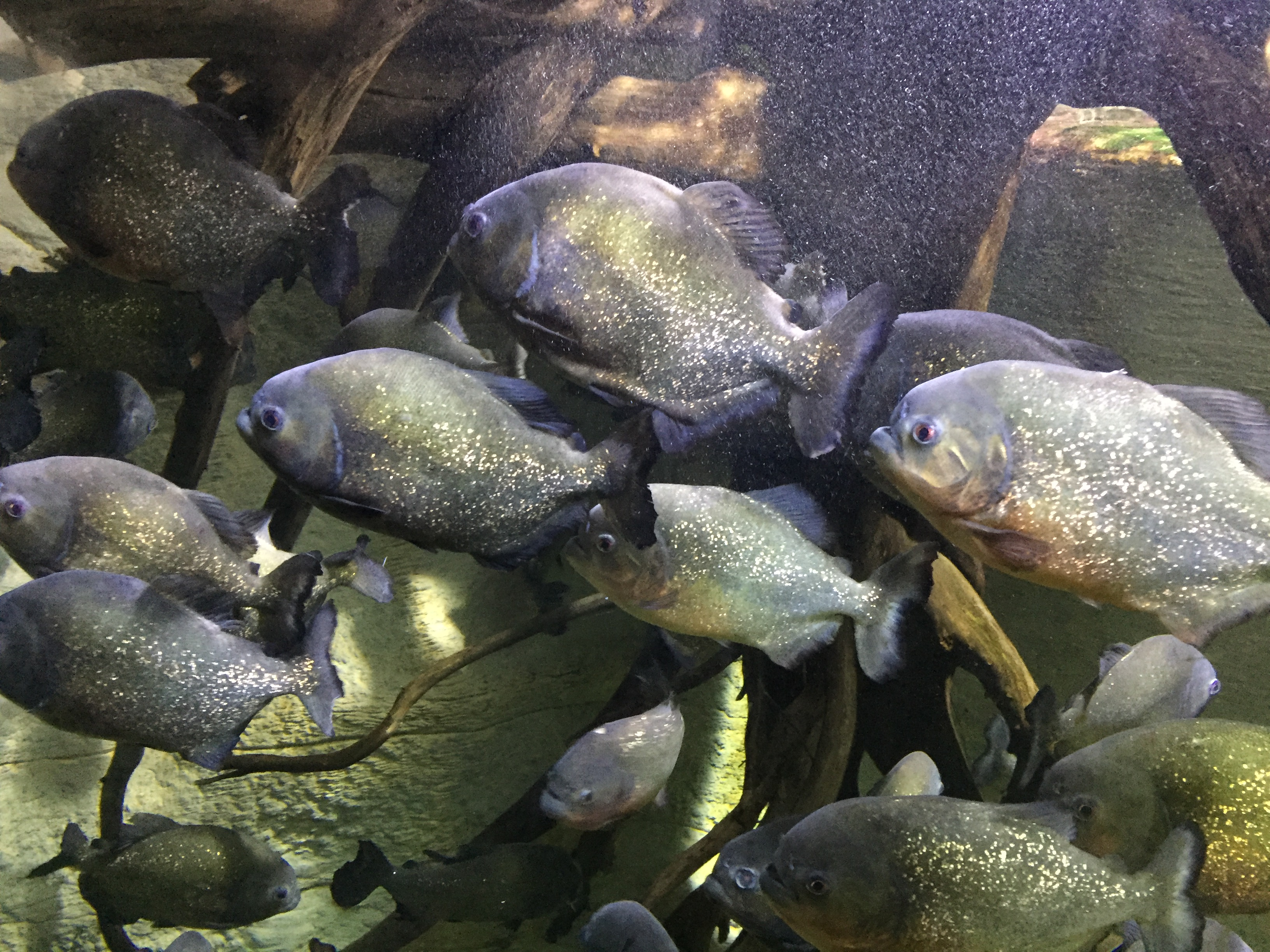
Pairi Daiza

Many myths surround this species. The 1978 film Piranha by Joe Dante shows these fish in a similar light to sharks in Jaws. Piranha was followed by a sequel, Piranha II: The Spawning, in 1982, and two remakes, one in 1995, and Piranha 3D in 2010, which also got a sequel of its own, Piranha 3DD. Films such as these, and stories of large schools of red-bellies attacking humans, fuel their exaggerated and erroneous reputation as being one of the most ferocious freshwater fish. In reality, they are generally timid scavengers, fulfilling a role similar to vultures on land. In Piranha 3D, a previously unknown piranha is discovered. Christopher Lloyd's character misidentifies a specimen of this monstrous new species as the familiar Pygocentrus nattereri.

== In aquariums ==
Red-bellied piranhas are sometimes kept as aquarium fish. They may be fed live, fresh, or frozen food, but they will not eat rotten meats. Their natural diet consists of live prey and dead animals or fish. Live feedings to captive piranhas can introduce diseases, and goldfish contain a growth-inhibiting hormone, which in turn will affect piranhas. Red-bellied piranhas, particularly when juvenile, will sometimes bite one another in the aquarium, normally on the fins, in behavior called 'fin nipping'. Those that have had their fins nipped will grow them back surprisingly rapidly. To maintain a piranha aquarium, it is important to keep the water quality up, as they are messy eaters, and this will dirty the water in the tank. Also, they need places to hide in dim light. Because in the wild they may not eat every day, those in captivity do not need to be fed daily, but when hungry, they can eat each other.
