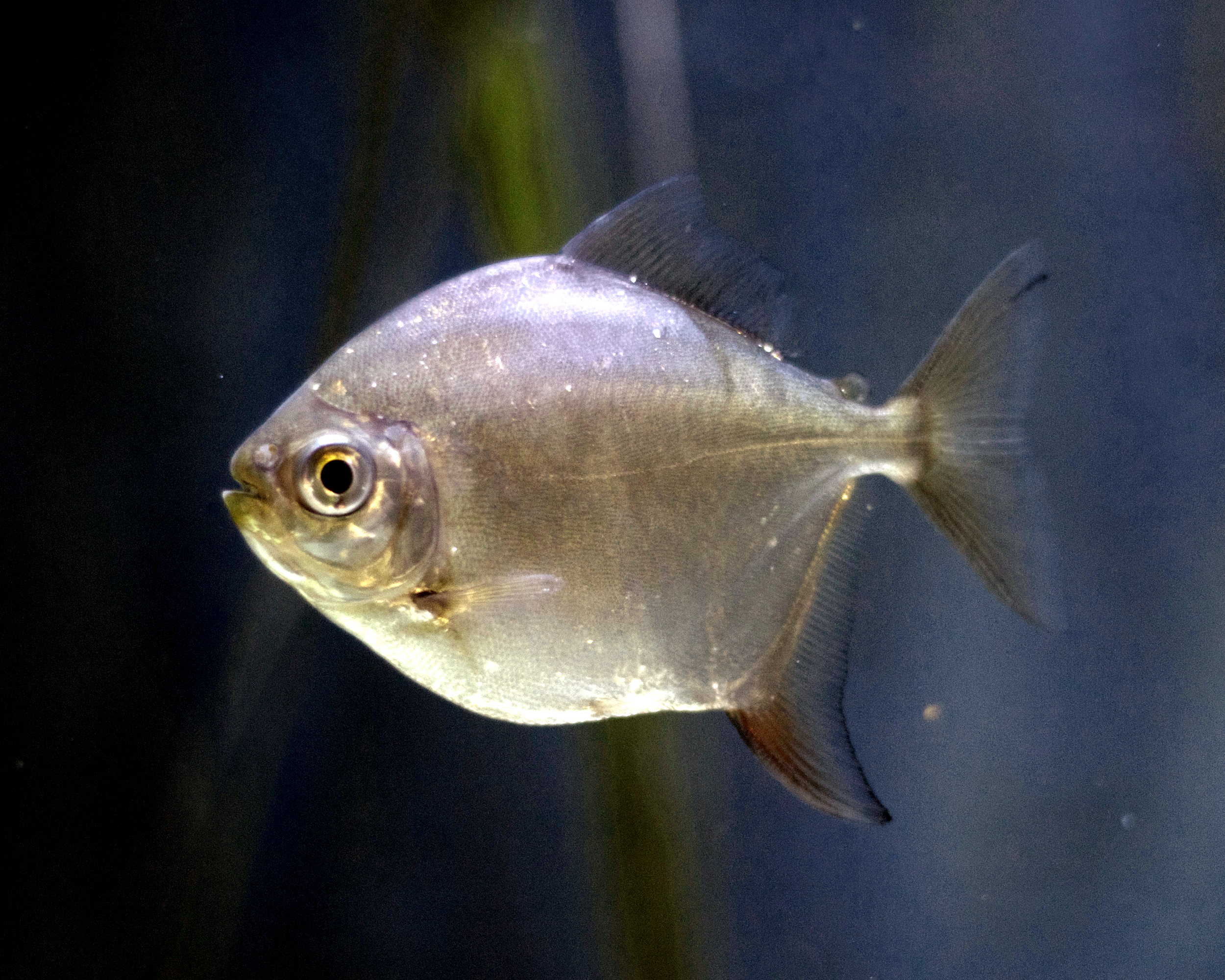

Scientific classification
- Kingdom: Animalia
- Phylum: Chordata
- Class: Actinopterygii
- Order: Characiformes
- Suborder: Characoidei
- Family: Serrasalmidae

Genera with silver dollar species
- Metynnis; Myleus; Mylesinus; Myloplus; Mylossoma; Tometes

= Silver dollar (fish) =

Common name for several species of fish

Silver dollar is a common name given to a number of species of fishes, mostly in the genus Metynnis, tropical fish belonging to the family Serrasalmidae which are closely related to piranha and pacu. Most commonly, the name refers to Metynnis argenteus. Native to South America, these somewhat round-shaped silver fish are popular with fish-keeping hobbyists.

The silver dollar is a peaceful schooling species that spends most of its time in the mid- to upper-level of the water. Its average lifespan is less than ten years but can live longer in captivity. A benthic spawner and egg scatterer, the adult fish will spawn around 2,000 eggs. This breeding occurs in soft, warm water in low light.

Silver dollars natively live in a tropical climate in the sides of weedy rivers. They prefer water with a pH of 5–7, a water hardness of up to 15 dGH, and an ideal temperature range of 24–28 °C (75–82 °F). Their diet is almost exclusively vegetarian and in captivity they will often eat all the plants in a tank. They will also eat worms and small insects.

== Fish compatibility ==
The silver dollar is listed as semi-aggressive but some silver dollars can be very mellow. These fish can be kept in community tanks with fish that can't fit in their mouths, and once fully grown, they can be kept with larger fish like oscars, pikes, and larger catfish.

== Breeding ==
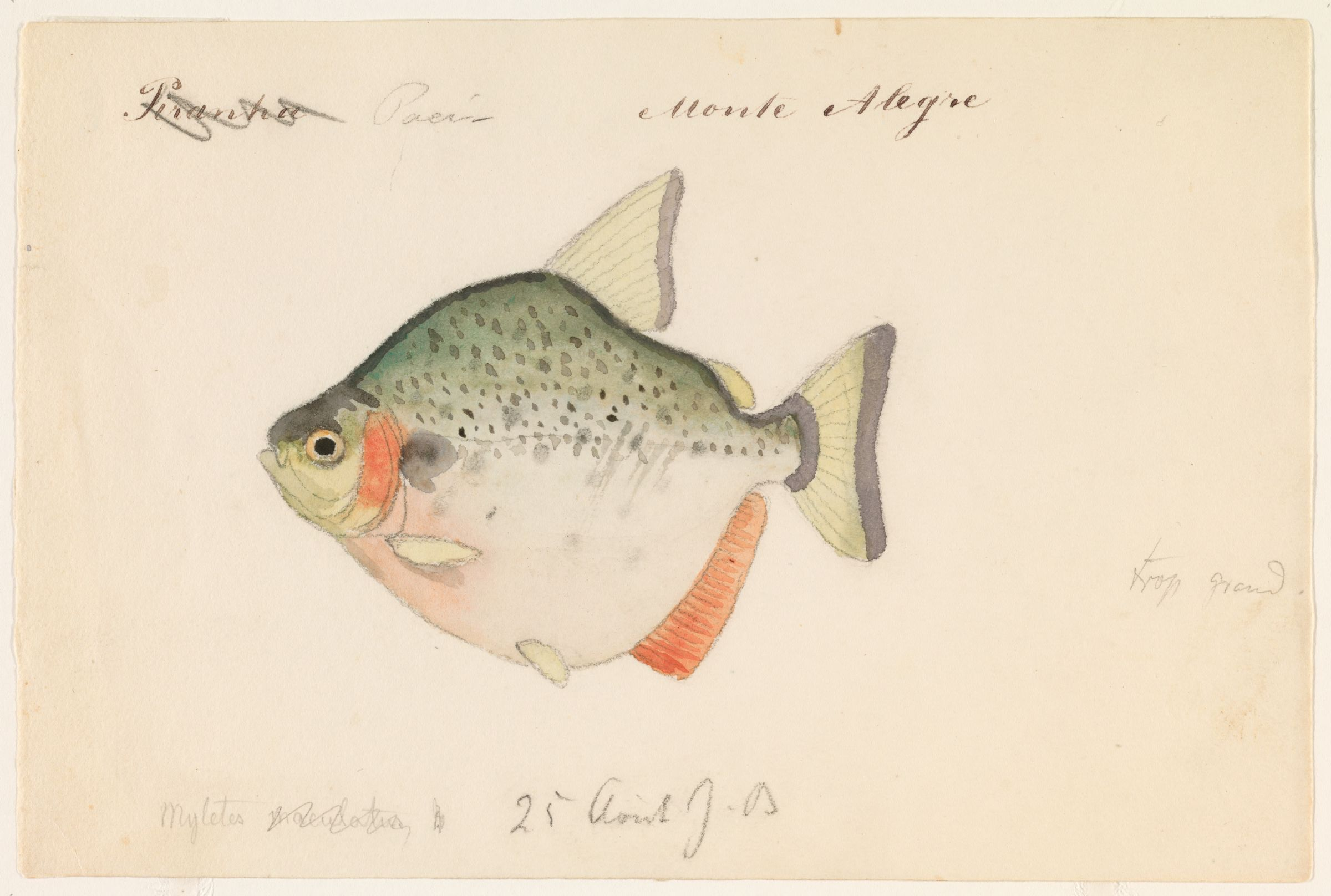
An 1865 watercolor painting of a silver dollar by Jacques Burkhardt.

The best way to acquire a breeding pair is to purchase a half dozen juvenile silver dollars and raise them together. The parents will not consume the eggs or fry, although other fish will, so when spawning them it is wise to place them in a separate tank. To facilitate spawning, make sure the water is soft (8 dgH or below) and warm (80 to 82 F), keep the lighting dim, and provide fine-leaved plants.

Eventually a pair will spawn, and the female will lay up to 2000 eggs. The eggs will fall to the bottom of the tank, where they will hatch in three days. After approximately a week, the fry will be free swimming and able to eat fine foods such as commercially prepared fry food, finely-crushed spirulina, or freshly-hatched brine shrimp.

== Silver dollar species ==
- Metynnis altidorsalis
- Metynnis argenteus (Silver dollar)
- Metynnis fasciatus (Striped silver dollar)
- Metynnis guaporensis
- Metynnis hypsauchen (Schreitmüller's silver dollar, Striped silver dollar)
- Metynnis lippincottianus (Spotted silver dollar)
- Metynnis luna (Red-spot silver dollar)
- Metynnis maculatus (Speckled silver dollar)
- Metynnis mola
- Metynnis otuquensis
- Myloplus rubripinnis (Red hook silver dollar)
- Myloplus schomburgkii (Black-barred silver dollar)
- Mylossoma duriventre (Silver mylossoma (Hard-bellied silver dollar)

Hard bellies are silvery and somewhat transparent; they are the most commonly encountered species.

== See also ==
- List of freshwater aquarium fish species
