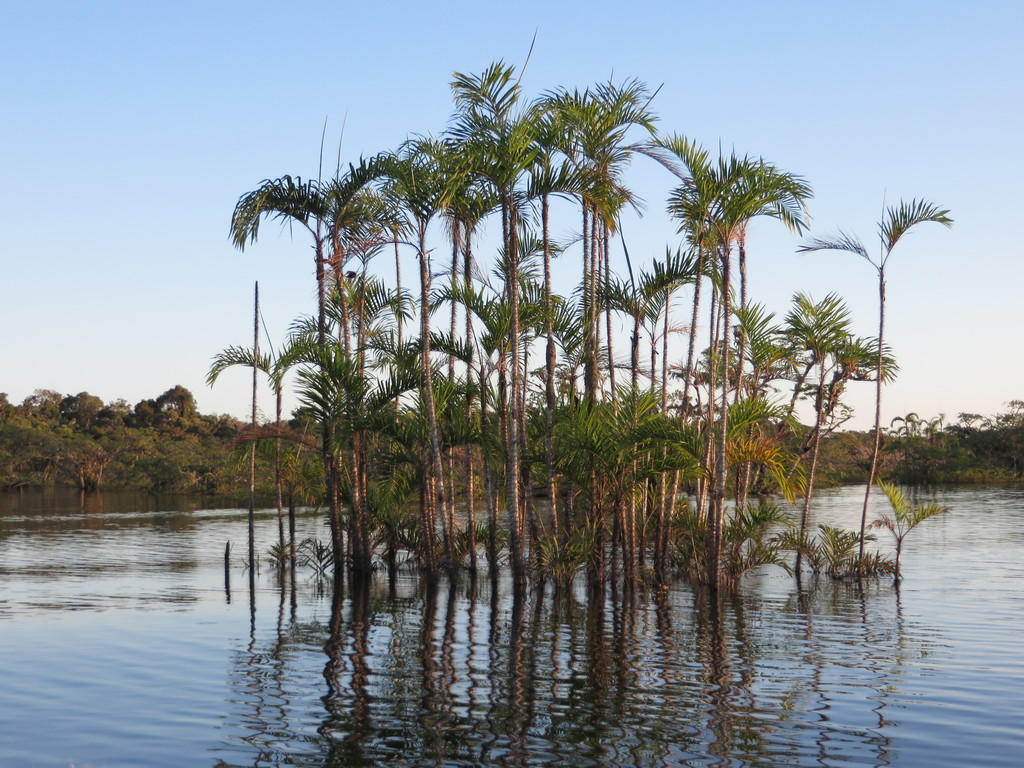

Conservation status
- Least Concern (IUCN 3.1)

Scientific classification
- Kingdom: Plantae
- Clade: Embryophytes
- Clade: Tracheophytes
- Clade: Spermatophytes
- Clade: Angiosperms
- Clade: Monocots
- Clade: Commelinids
- Order: Arecales
- Family: Arecaceae
- Genus: Bactris
- Species: B. riparia

Binomial name
- Bactris riparia Mart.

Synonyms
- Bactris inundata Mart.; Bactris littoralis Barb.Rodr.; Bactris longifrons Mart.

= Bactris riparia =

Species of flowering plant

Bactris riparia is a species of flowering plant in the family Arecaceae. The species is native to the rivers of South America.

Bactris riparia is a palm tree with compound leaves, a tube-shaped corolla, and orange, red, or green fruits. It is eaten by a variety of fish. The species was described in 1826, and is listed as of Least Concern by the International Union for Conservation of Nature.

== Taxonomy ==
Bactris riparia was described in 1826, by Carl Friedrich Philipp von Martius.

== Distribution ==
Bactris riparia is native to the wet tropical biome of Bolivia, (Beni, La Paz, Pando, and Santa Cruz), northern Brazil (Acre and Amazonas), Colombia (Amazonas), Ecuador (Sucumbíos), and Peru (Loreto and Ucayali).

The species is present in blackwater rivers, and is less common in whitewater rivers. It grows at the edges of streams, rivers, and lakes, The stems are often partially submerged by floods. The species is present at elevations of 120–300 metres (390–980 ft).

== Description ==
Bactris riparia is a palm tree up to 10 metres (33 ft) high. The stems have black and brown prickles up to 8 centimetres (3.1 in) long, and usually form large clumps.

The leaves are compound. The segments are irregularly clustered in groups of two to seven. There are thirty-three to sixty-two segments on each side. The leaf stems are 10–70 centimetres (0.33–2.30 ft) long.

The flower stems are spiny, curved, and 10–20 centimetres (3.9–7.9 in) long. The male flowers are 4–6 millimetres (0.16–0.24 in) long, and have six stamens. The female flowers are 4.5–6 millimetres (0.18–0.24 in) long. The calyx is 1–1.5 millimetres (0.039–0.059 in) long, and cup-shaped. The corolla is tube-shaped, and 4–5 millimetres (0.16–0.20 in) long. The sepals have 1–1.5 millimetres (0.039–0.059 in) long lobes. The petals are 3–5.5 millimetres (0.12–0.22 in) long.

The fruits are orange, red, or green, roughly spherical, and 1.5–2 centimetres (0.59–0.79 in) in diameter. The outer layer is smooth. The mesocarp is starchy. The endocarp is shaped like a spinning top and has numerous fibers.

== Ecology ==
Bactris riparia is eaten by a variety of fish, including Brycon amazonicus, Brycon falcatus, Brycon melanopterus, Myloplus asterias, Myloplus rubripinnis, Myloplus torquatus, Piaractus brachypomus, Piaractus mesopotamicus, Triportheus angulatus, and Triportheus culter.

== Uses ==
Bactris riparia is used for food.

== Conservation ==
In 2018, the IUCN assessed Bactris riparia as of Least Concern. It has a large population, and faces no major threats.
