= Black pacu =

Black pacu is a common name for several fishes and may refer to:

- Colossoma macropomum
- Myleus schomburgkii
- Piaractus brachypomus
