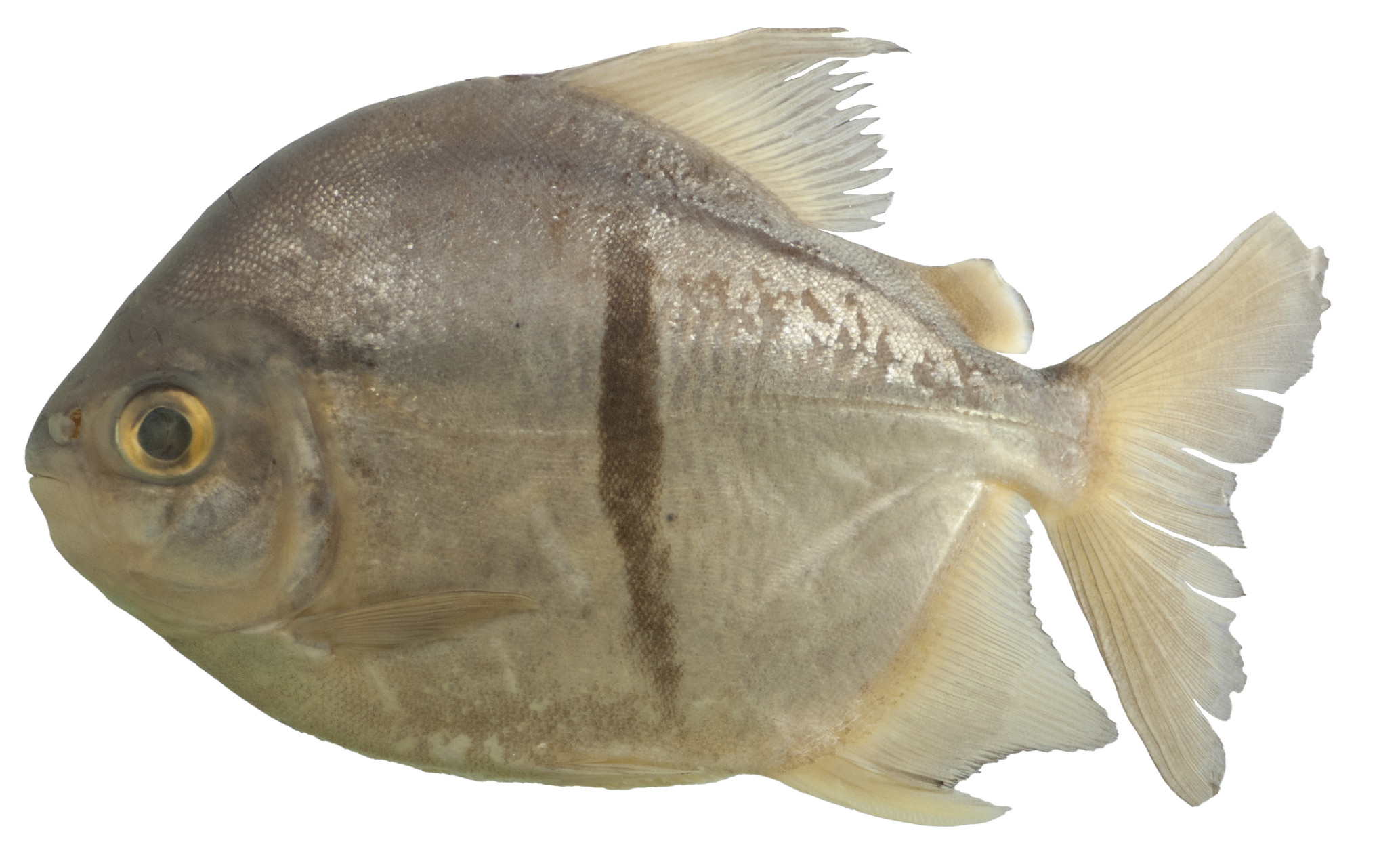

Scientific classification
- Kingdom: Animalia
- Phylum: Chordata
- Class: Actinopterygii
- Order: Characiformes
- Family: Serrasalmidae
- Genus: Myloplus
- Species: M. sauron

Binomial name
- Myloplus sauron Pereira, R. P. Ota, V. N. Machado, R. A. Collins, M. C. Andrade, Garcia-Ayala, Jégu, I. P. Farias & Hrbek, 2024

= Myloplus sauron =

Species of fish

Myloplus sauron is a freshwater species of ray-finned fish in the family Serrasalmidae. It is found in South America and restricted to the Xingu River. It was once included in Myloplus schomburgkii, but was split from that species in 2024 alongside Myloplus aylan.

== Etymology ==
The fish is named after Sauron, the main antagonist of the fantasy novel The Lord of the Rings. The naming of the fish is due to the vertical black band on the fish resembling the vertical-pupilled eye of Sauron.
