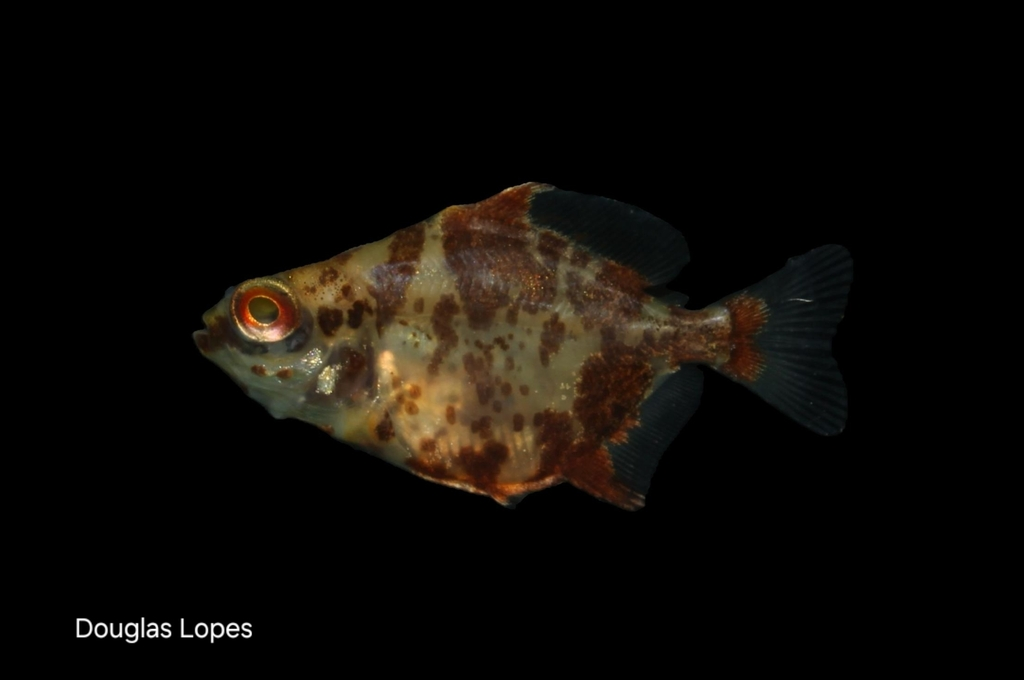

Conservation status
- Least Concern (IUCN 3.1)

Scientific classification
- Kingdom: Animalia
- Phylum: Chordata
- Class: Actinopterygii
- Order: Characiformes
- Family: Serrasalmidae
- Genus: Myloplus
- Species: M. levis

Binomial name
- Myloplus levis (C. H. Eigenmann & McAtee, 1907)

Synonyms
- Myleus levis Eigenmann & McAtee, 1907

= Myloplus levis =

Species of fish

Myloplus levis, the Moon pacu, is a species of freshwater ray-finned fish belonging to the family Serrasalmidae, which includes the pacus and piranhas. This fish is found in southern South America.

== Taxonomy ==
Myloplus levis was first formally described as Myleus levis in 1907 by the American ichthyologists Carl H. Eigenmann and Waldo Lee McAtee, with its type locality given as Bahía Negra in Paraguay. The genus Myloplus is classified in the subfamily Myleinae, of the family Serrasalmidae, which is classified in the suborder Characoidei of the order Characiformes.

== Etymology ==
Myloplus levis is classified within the genus Myloplus. This taxon was originally proposed as a subgenus of Myletes, this being a name which has been suppressed by the International Commission on Zoological Nomenclature as a synonym of Alestes. The proposer of this genus, Theodore Gill, did not explain its etymology. It may be a combination of mylo-, a reference to the disk-shaped body, and a prefix used for similarly-shaped fishes in the same family, with plus, which means "more", i.e., another Myleus-like genus. The specific name, levis, means "smooth", "polished" or "bald", an allusion Eigenmann and McAtee did not explain, nor is it obvious why they chose this name.

== Description ==
Myloplus levis has a maximum published standard length of 20 cm (7.9 in). It is dark brown in colour, lighter below the lateral line. The fins are translucent, apart from the dusky base of the dorsal fin and the black blotch on the margin of the anal fin.

== Distribution and habitat ==
Myloplus levis occurs in the Paraguay-Paraná River drainage system, in Brazil, Bolivia and Paraguay. Pacus in the genus Myloplus are typically found in calm water close to banks in the main channels and in the vicinity of rapids.
