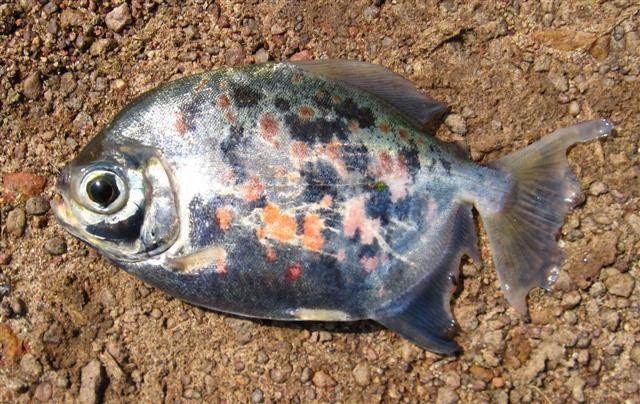
- Pará, Brazil

Conservation status
- Least Concern (IUCN 3.1)

Scientific classification
- Kingdom: Animalia
- Phylum: Chordata
- Class: Actinopterygii
- Order: Characiformes
- Family: Serrasalmidae
- Genus: Myloplus
- Species: M. asterias

Binomial name
- Myloplus asterias (J. P. Müller & Troschel, 1844)

Synonyms
- Myletes asterias J. P. Müller & Troschel, 1844; Myletes ellipticus Günther, 1864; Myleus gurupyensis Steindachner, 1911; Myloplus schulzei Ahl, 1938; Tomete maculatus Amaral Campos, 1944

= Myloplus asterias =

Species of fish

Myloplus asterias, the redgill pacu, is a species of freshwater ray-finned fish belonging to the family Serrasalmidae, which includes the pacus and piranhas. This fish is found in northern South America.

== Taxonomy ==
Myloplus asterias was first formally described as Myletes asterias in 1844 by the German zoologists Johannes Peter Müller and Franz Hermann Troschel, with its type locality given as the Essequibo River in Guyana. In 1896, Theodore Gill proposed the genus Myloplus, and in 1920 David Starr Jordan designated this taxon as the type species of this genus. The genus Myloplus is classified in the subfamily Myleinae, of the family Serrasalmidae, which is classified in the suborder Characoidei of the order Characiformes.

== Etymology ==
Myloplus asterias is the type species of the genus Myloplus. This taxon was originally proposed as a subgenus of Myletes, this being a name which has been suppressed by the International Commission on Zoological Nomenclature as a synonym of Alestes. The proposer of this genus, Theodore Gill, did not explain its etymology. It may be a combination of mylo-, a reference to the disk-shaped body, and a prefix used for similarly-shaped fishes in the same family, with plus, which means "more", i.e., another Myleus-like genus. The specific name, asterias, is a Greek word meaning a "starred fish" or "starred bird". What this referred to was not explained by Müller and Troschel, but it may be an allusion to the circular orange spots on the body of this fish.

== Description ==
Myloplus asterias has a maximum published total length of 25 cm (9.8 in). This species is often confused with M. rubripinnis but by can be distinguished by a number of characteristics of the neurocranial anatomy, connected to the reduced frontal bone. It also differs from M. rubripinnis by certain meristic and morphometric characters, and in having a wide, vertical black band on its eyes.

== Distribution and habitat ==
Myloplus asteriasis found in the Amazon basin, the Orinoco and the rivers of the northern and eastern Guiana Shield. Its range includes Bolivia, Brazil, Colombia, Ecuador, Guyana, Peru, Suriname and Venezuela. It is found in the main river channels in the vicinity of rapids and along banks where there is calm water.
