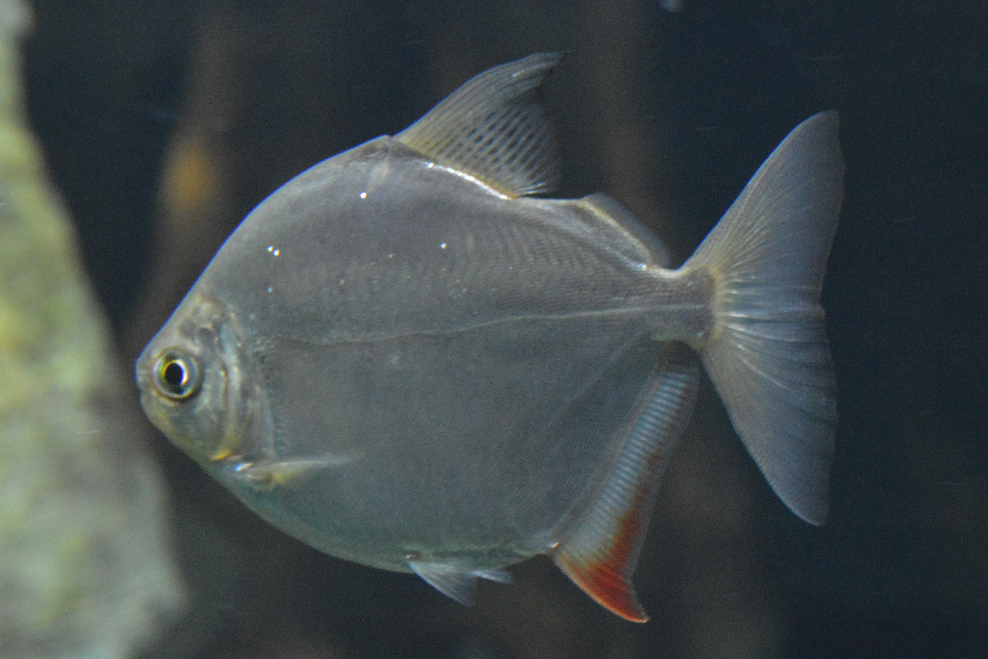
- Metynnis hypsauchen

Scientific classification
- Kingdom: Animalia
- Phylum: Chordata
- Class: Actinopterygii
- Division: Teleostei
- Order: Characiformes
- Family: Serrasalmidae
- Subfamily: Serrasalminae
- Genus: Metynnis; Cope, 1878

Type species
- Metynnis luna Cope, 1878

Synonyms
- Myleocollops C. H. Eigenmann, 1903; Sealeina Fowler, 1907

= Metynnis =

Genus of fishes

Metynnis is a genus of Serrasalmid fishes belonging to the subfamily Serrasalminae, the piranhas. They are native to tropical and subtropical South America. They are herbivorous or omnivorous, and inhabit a wide range of freshwater habitats, ranging from rivers and streams (both fast- and slow-flowing), to floodplains, flooded forests, lakes, pools and reservoirs. They generally reach 8–15 cm (3–6 in) in standard length, although a few species may reach up to 18 cm (7 in). The genus contains many of the species known as silver dollars in the aquarium trade.

== History of study ==
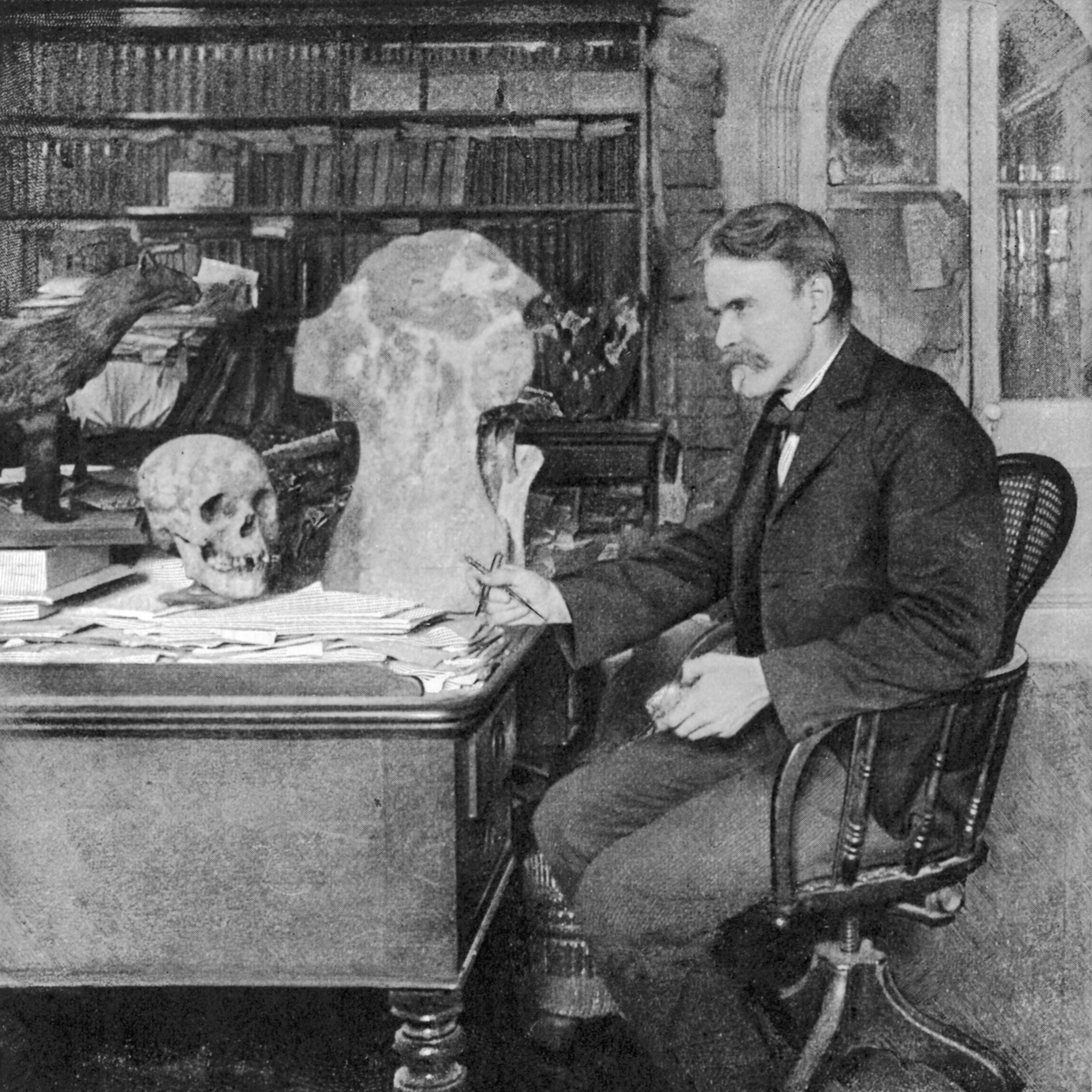
Edward Drinker Cope in his office during the 1870s.

The first species to be formally described was Metynnis luna in 1878 by the paleontologist and biologist, Edward Drinker Cope. The type specimen was collected and studied the year prior.

== Species ==
These are the currently recognized species in this genus as of 2025:

- Metynnis altidorsalis Ahl 1924
- Metynnis anisurus Ahl, 1924
- Metynnis argenteus Ahl, 1924
- Metynnis cuiaba Pavanelli, Ota & Petry, 2009
- Metynnis fasciatus Ahl, 1931
- Metynnis guaporensis C. H. Eigenmann, 1915
- Metynnis hypsauchen (Müller & Troschel, 1844)
- Metynnis lippincottianus (Cope, 1870)
- Metynnis longipinnis Zarske & Géry, 2008
- Metynnis luna Cope, 1878
- Metynnis maculatus (Kner, 1858)
- Metynnis melanogrammus Ota, Rapp Py-Daniel & Jégu, 2016
- Metynnis mola Eigenmann & Kennedy, 1903
- Metynnis orinocensis (Steindachner, 1908)
- Metynnis otuquensis Ahl, 1924
- Metynnis polystictus Zarske & Géry, 2008
