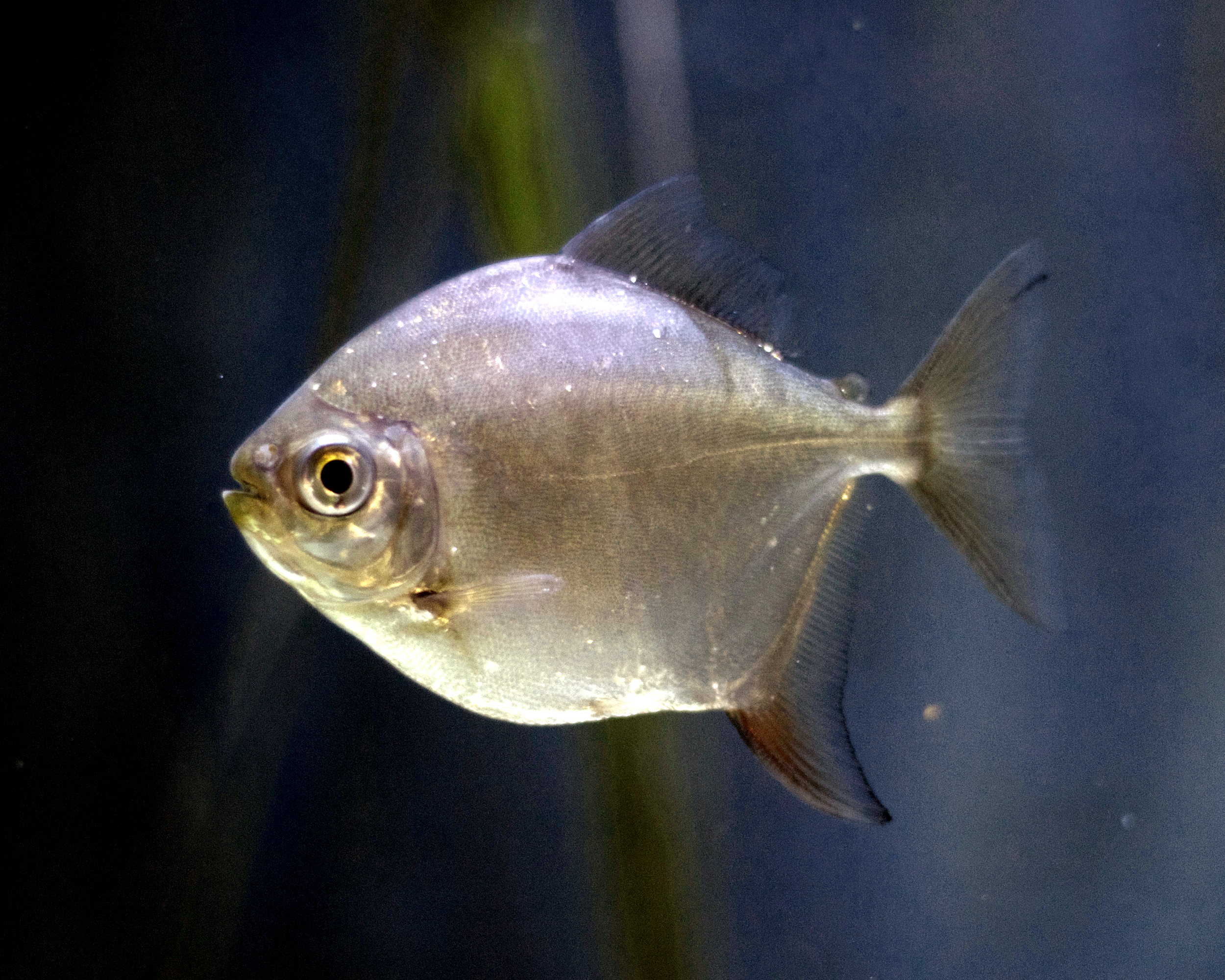

Conservation status
- Least Concern (IUCN 3.1)

Scientific classification
- Kingdom: Animalia
- Phylum: Chordata
- Class: Actinopterygii
- Order: Characiformes
- Family: Serrasalmidae
- Genus: Metynnis
- Species: M. argenteus

Binomial name
- Metynnis argenteus C. G. E. Ahl, 1923

Synonyms
- Metynnis eigenmanni Ahl, 1924

= Metynnis argenteus =

Species of fish

Metynnis argenteus is a species of freshwater ray-finned fishes belonging to the family Serrasalmidae, which includes the pacus, piranhas and related fishes. This fish is endemic to the Tapajós River Basin in Brazil. It is one of the species known in the aquarium trade as the "silver dollar". M. argenteus is generally considered the archetypal silver dollar, although it and the very similar M. hypsauchen frequently have been confused.

== Identification ==
Round-bodied and laterally compressed, under normal conditions M. argenteus is a uniform silver colour, sometimes showing vague red colouration in the fins and around the throat. Commonly seen for sale as juveniles at around two inches long, they are peaceful shoalers. Fully grown females in captivity can reach a length of between five and six inches while males tend to be marginally smaller. In good condition, females tend to be fuller in the belly than males, while males develop marginally longer fins as they grow older. During courtship and breeding, males develop two large, very prominent black spots, one above the other, just behind the base of the pectoral fins, the red colouration of the fins deepens and contrasting black borders appear. Some male specimens may also display other dark marbling on the flanks. Females display little, if any, variation in colour during courtship and breeding.

== Behaviour in aquaria ==
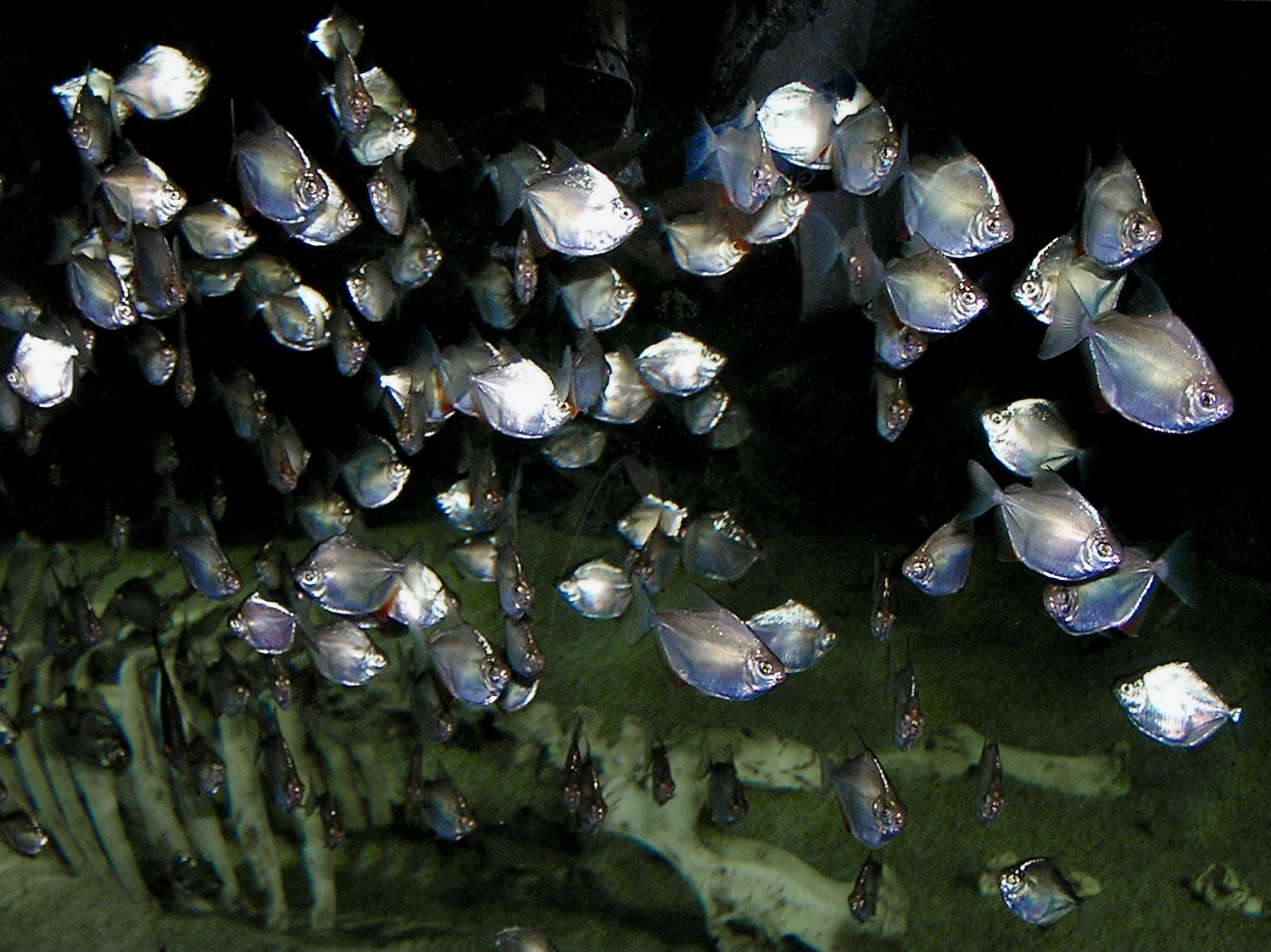
A large school of M. argenteus

A very peaceful shoaling species, M. argenteus can be skittish and timid if left without any kind of shelter, and if kept in isolation they tend to become reclusive. Kept in a shoal, given plenty of room to move and provided with cover behind which they can hide if they feel threatened, they do very well indeed. Contrary to popular myth they are not overly demanding with regard to water quality, though they do best in warm, clear, well-aerated, mobile and well-filtered water. They are peaceful enough to be trusted with much smaller fish than themselves, and robust enough to cope in the company of much larger fish.

=== Diet ===
Metynnis argenteus, like all other known Metynnis, are mainly herbivores, but also take animal matter. They will readily and eagerly accept dried flake food as well as live and frozen foods like bloodworm, shelled shrimps, rinsed tuna, daphnia and brine shrimp. Their diet should be varied to keep them in good condition. They will nibble at sliced cucumber and show considerable interest in shelled peas and carrots, boiled potato and small chunks of fresh and tinned fruit. They will hack at live plants all day long to the extent that aquarists routinely forego live plants in a tank containing silver dollars and resort to decorating with plastic plants instead.

=== Spawning ===
In most cases, sexual maturity sets in when M. argenteus grow to around four inches long, though this remains variable. Among a given shoal, the males tend to become active before the females and spend a period of time sparring while the females look on. When the females do eventually become sexually active, courtship and spawning in a healthy shoal kept under optimum conditions often become a daily activity. M. argenteus are prolific, group-spawning egg scatterers which show little if any interest in their own young. They scatter eggs among fine-leaved plants as well as directly on to the substrate during a characteristic, side-by-side, shimmying courtship ritual. It is a common practice among breeders to put a layer of marbles on the bottom of the tank if breeding is desired in a community tank. The idea is that the eggs fall between the gaps in the marbles where they can develop in peace: other fish can't get to them during that vulnerable period and when the fry do eventually rise they are equipped with a chance of dodging predators.
