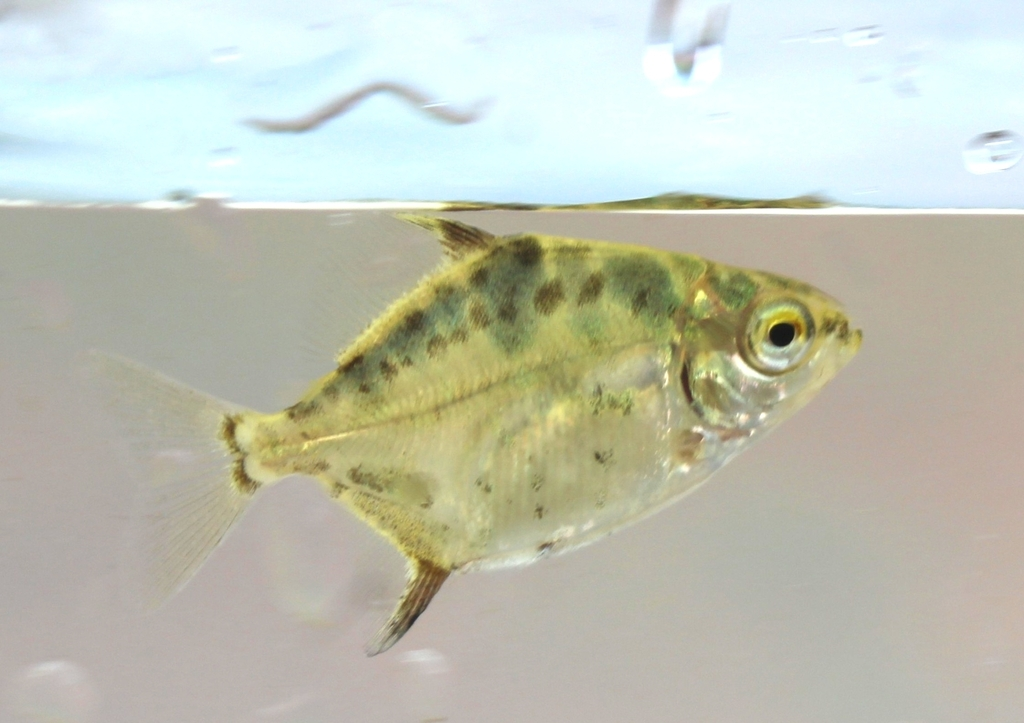

Conservation status
- Near Threatened (IUCN 3.1)

Scientific classification
- Kingdom: Animalia
- Phylum: Chordata
- Class: Actinopterygii
- Order: Characiformes
- Family: Serrasalmidae
- Genus: Myloplus
- Species: M. tiete

Binomial name
- Myloplus tiete (C. H. Eigenmann & A. A. Norris, 1900)

Synonyms
- Myletes tiete Eigenmann & Norris, 1900; Myleus tiete (Eigenmann & Norris, 1900)

= Myloplus tiete =

Tiete Pacu

Species of fish

Myloplus tiete, the tiete pacu, is a medium to large omnivorous fish of the family Serrasalmidae from South America, where it is found in the Paraguay-Paraná River basin. It can grow to a length of 16.3 cm (6.4 in).
