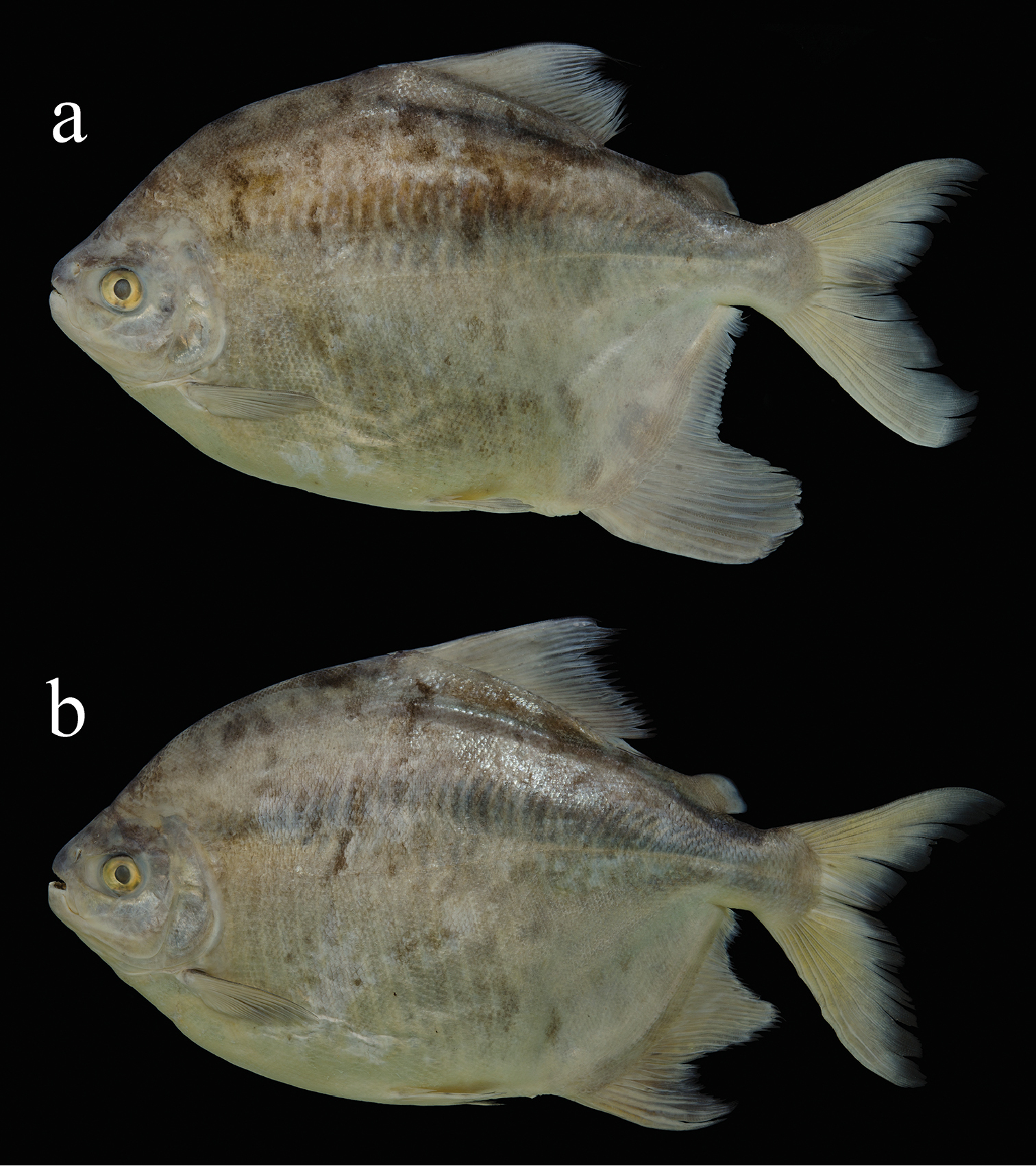
- Myloplus zorroi female (holotype) and male (paratype)

Scientific classification
- Kingdom: Animalia
- Phylum: Chordata
- Class: Actinopterygii
- Order: Characiformes
- Family: Serrasalmidae
- Genus: Myloplus
- Species: M. zorroi

Binomial name
- Myloplus zorroi M. C. Andrade, Jégu & Giarrizzo, 2016

= Myloplus zorroi =

Species of fish

Myloplus zorroi is a medium to large omnivorous fish of the family Serrasalmidae from Brazil.

== Etymology ==
The fish is named in honor of Mauricio Camargo-Zorro, a researcher at the Instituto Federal de Educação, Ciência e Tecnologia in São Paulo.
