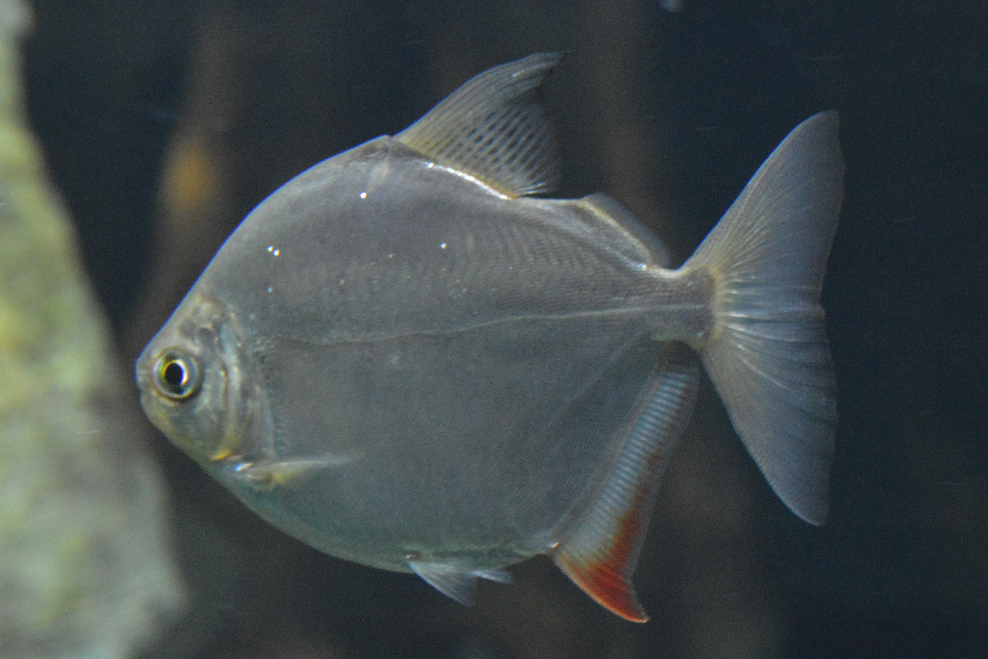

Conservation status
- Least Concern (IUCN 3.1)

Scientific classification
- Kingdom: Animalia
- Phylum: Chordata
- Class: Actinopterygii
- Order: Characiformes
- Family: Serrasalmidae
- Genus: Metynnis
- Species: M. hypsauchen

Binomial name
- Metynnis hypsauchen (J. P. Müller & Troschel, 1844)

Synonyms
- Myletes hypsauchen J. P. Müller & Troschel, 1844; Metynnis calichromus schreitmuelleri Ahl, 1922; Metynnis calichromus Ahl, 1924; Metynnis ehrhardti Ahl, 1927

= Metynnis hypsauchen =

Species of fish

Metynnis hypsauchen is a species of freshwater ray-finned fishes belonging to the family Serrasalmidae, which includes the pacus, piranhas and related fishes. This fish is found in Amazon and Paraguay River basins, as well as rivers of the Guiana Shield. It is one of the fish known as the "silver dollar" in the aquarium trade. It has frequently been confused with the very similar M. argenteus. It reaches a length of 15 cm (5.9 in).

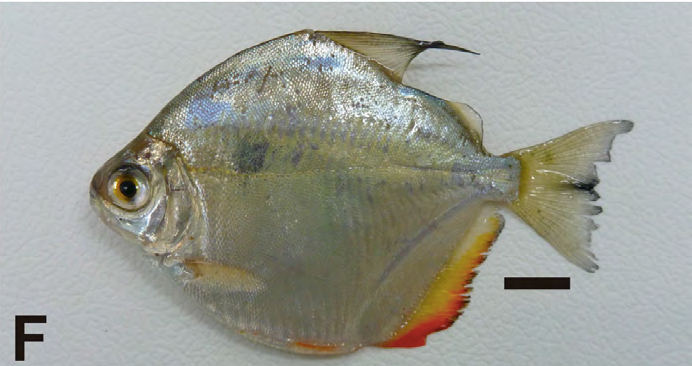
Tocantins, Brazil, scale bar = 1 cm
