= Myloplus lobatus =

Conservation status
- Least Concern (IUCN 3.1)

Scientific classification
- Kingdom: Animalia
- Phylum: Chordata
- Class: Actinopterygii
- Order: Characiformes
- Family: Serrasalmidae
- Genus: Myloplus
- Species: M. lobatus

Binomial name
- Myloplus lobatus (Valenciennes 1850)

Synonyms
- Myletes lobatus Valenciennes, 1850; Myleus lobatus (Valenciennes, 1850); Myletes discoideus Kner, 1860; Myletes parma Günther, 1864

Species of fish

Myloplus lobatus is a medium to large omnivorous fish of the family Serrasalmidae from South America, where it is found in the Amazon and Orinoco River basins. It can grow to a length of 24 cm (9.4 in).
