= Myloplus lucienae =

Scientific classification
- Kingdom: Animalia
- Phylum: Chordata
- Class: Actinopterygii
- Order: Characiformes
- Family: Serrasalmidae
- Genus: Myloplus
- Species: M. lucienae

Binomial name
- Myloplus lucienae M. C. Andrade, Ota, Bastos & Jégu, 2016

Species of fish

Myloplus lucienae is a medium to large omnivorous fish of the family Serrasalmidae from Brazil. It can grow to a length of 33.8 cm (13.3 in).

== Etymology ==
The fish is named in honor of Luciene Maria Kassar Borges, in recognition for her attempt in a 1986 Ph.D. dissertation to organize the knowledge of the herbivorous Serrasalmidae from the Rio Negro basin.
