= Myloplus torquatus =

Conservation status
- Least Concern (IUCN 3.1)

Scientific classification
- Kingdom: Animalia
- Phylum: Chordata
- Class: Actinopterygii
- Order: Characiformes
- Family: Serrasalmidae
- Genus: Myloplus
- Species: M. torquatus

Binomial name
- Myloplus torquatus (Kner, 1858)

Synonyms
- Myletes torquatus Kner, 1858; Myleus torquatus (Kner, 1858)

Species of fish

Myloplus torquatus, orangefin pacu, is a medium to large omnivorous fish of the family Serrasalmidae from South America, where it is found in the Amazon, the Rio Negro and the Orinoco basins. They are also one of the fish referred to as "silver dollars".

These fish are capable of delivering serious bites to humans.
