= Myloplus tumukumak =

Scientific classification
- Kingdom: Animalia
- Phylum: Chordata
- Class: Actinopterygii
- Order: Characiformes
- Family: Serrasalmidae
- Genus: Myloplus
- Species: M. tumukumak

Binomial name
- Myloplus tumukumak M. C. Andrade, Jégu & Gama, 2018

Species of fish

Myloplus tumukumak is a medium to large omnivorous fish of the family Serrasalmidae from the Tumucumaque Mountain Range, in Brazil and French Guiana.
