= Myloplus nigrolineatus =

Scientific classification
- Kingdom: Animalia
- Phylum: Chordata
- Class: Actinopterygii
- Order: Characiformes
- Family: Serrasalmidae
- Genus: Myloplus
- Species: M. nigrolineatus

Binomial name
- Myloplus nigrolineatus R. P. Ota, V. N. Machado, M. C. Andrade, R. A. Collins, I. P. Farias & Hrbek, 2020

Species of fish

Myloplus nigrolineatus is a species of freshwater fish in the serrasalmid family (family Serrasalmidae) of order Characiformes. It is native to the Amazon River basin in South America.

== Description ==
Like other members of the serrasalmid family, Myloplus nigrolineatus is characterized by a deep, elliptical, and laterally compressed body, giving it a shape reminiscent of an elongated disc. The body ranges from 146 to 238 mm (5.7 to 9.4 in) in length and 59 to 71 mm (2.3 to 2.8 in) in depth. It has a slightly upturned, terminal mouth with two rows of molar-like teeth. Behind this main row of teeth is a pair of conical cutting teeth with a sharp surface on the front edge. The cycloid scales are tiny and numerous, and the scales along the lateral line are black colored due to high concentrations of black chromatophores. Overall color ranges from silver to lead-grey with scattered orange blotching. Breeding males will also display bright orange to red patches around the gill plates, pectoral fins, and on the anterior lobe of the anal fin. Breeding females show irregular orange and dark grey blotches scattered on flanks. A stout spine precedes the dorsal fin, and the forked caudal fin has equal sized lobes.

== Taxonomy ==
=== Classification ===
Myloplus nigrolineatus is primarily distinguished from its cogeners by the black row of lateral line scales for which it is named. The intensity of this coloration can vary depending on which river within the Amazon basin a population occupies. Additional morphological characteristics that differentiate M. nigrolineatus from other members of its genus include the presence of 25 to 29 branched rays in the dorsal fin, and a greater number of lateral line scales (98-120 vs. fewer than 98 in other species).

=== Etymology ===
The generic name Myloplus comes from the Greek word mylos meaning grey mullet, and ploos meaning movement of a serpent. The specific name nigrolineatus, and references the Latin word nigro meaning black, and lineatus meaning lined, and is derived from the dark colored lateral line characteristic of the species.

== Distribution and habitat ==
Myloplus nigrolineatus is widely distributed throughout the Amazon basin, where it inhabits slow-flowing backwaters and lakes. Specimens have been recorded from the Aripuanã, Água Boa do Univini, Nhamundá, Tapajós, Tocantins, Jutaí, Maués-Açu, and Uatumã rivers, as well as Pauapixuna lake (Juruá River), Tapauá lake (Purus River), Serpa lake (Amazon River), Tracajá lake, and the Negro river basin.

Despite the broad geographic range, this species is restricted to two specific habitat types. It requires either clear waters with very low levels of suspended sediments, or low ph and low sediment load blackwater habitats.

== Diet ==
This species is herbivorous, feeding mainly on aquatic plants.
