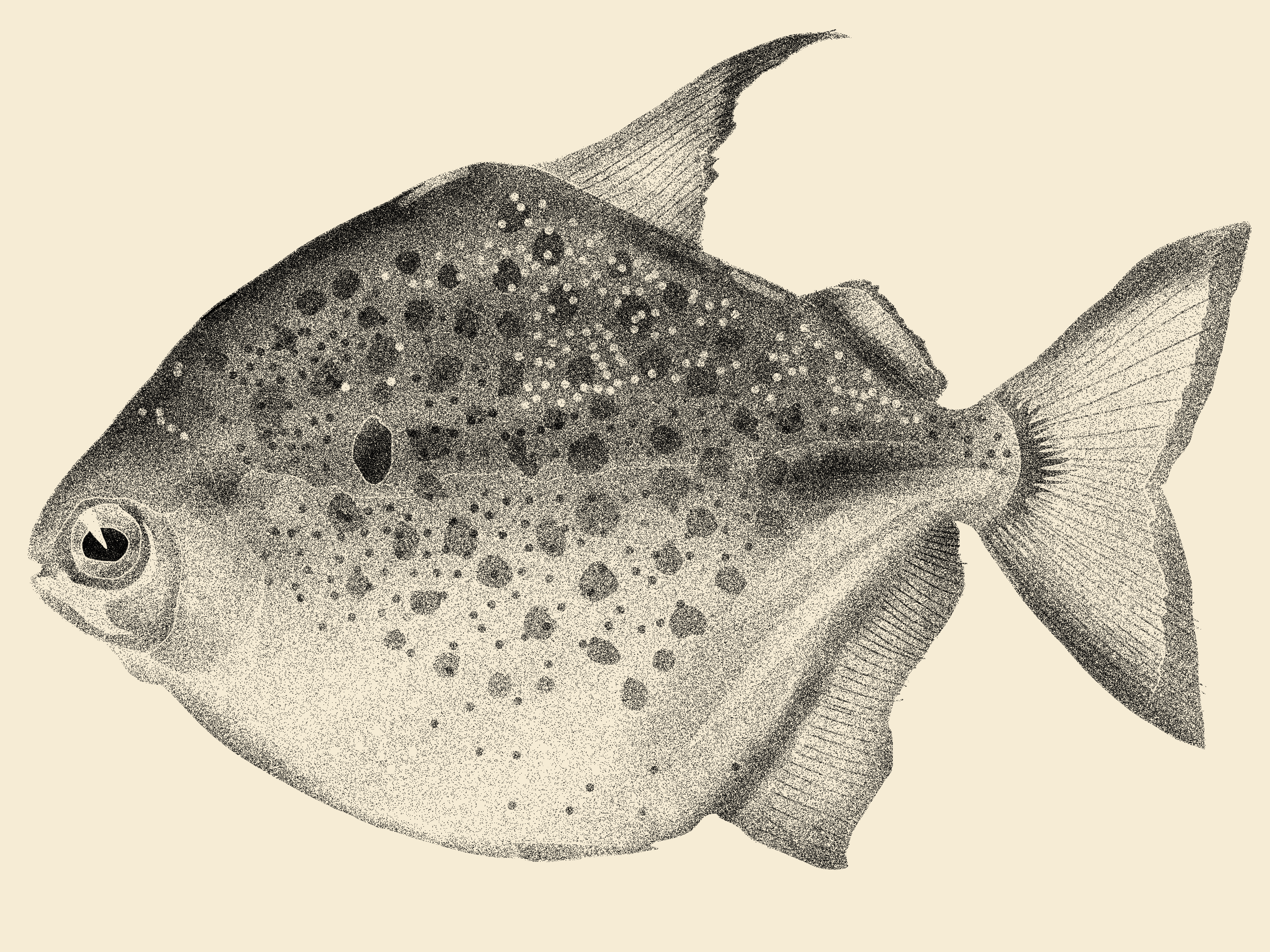

Conservation status
- Least Concern (IUCN 3.1)

Scientific classification
- Kingdom: Animalia
- Phylum: Chordata
- Class: Actinopterygii
- Order: Characiformes
- Family: Serrasalmidae
- Genus: Metynnis
- Species: M. maculatus

Binomial name
- Metynnis maculatus (Kner, 1858)
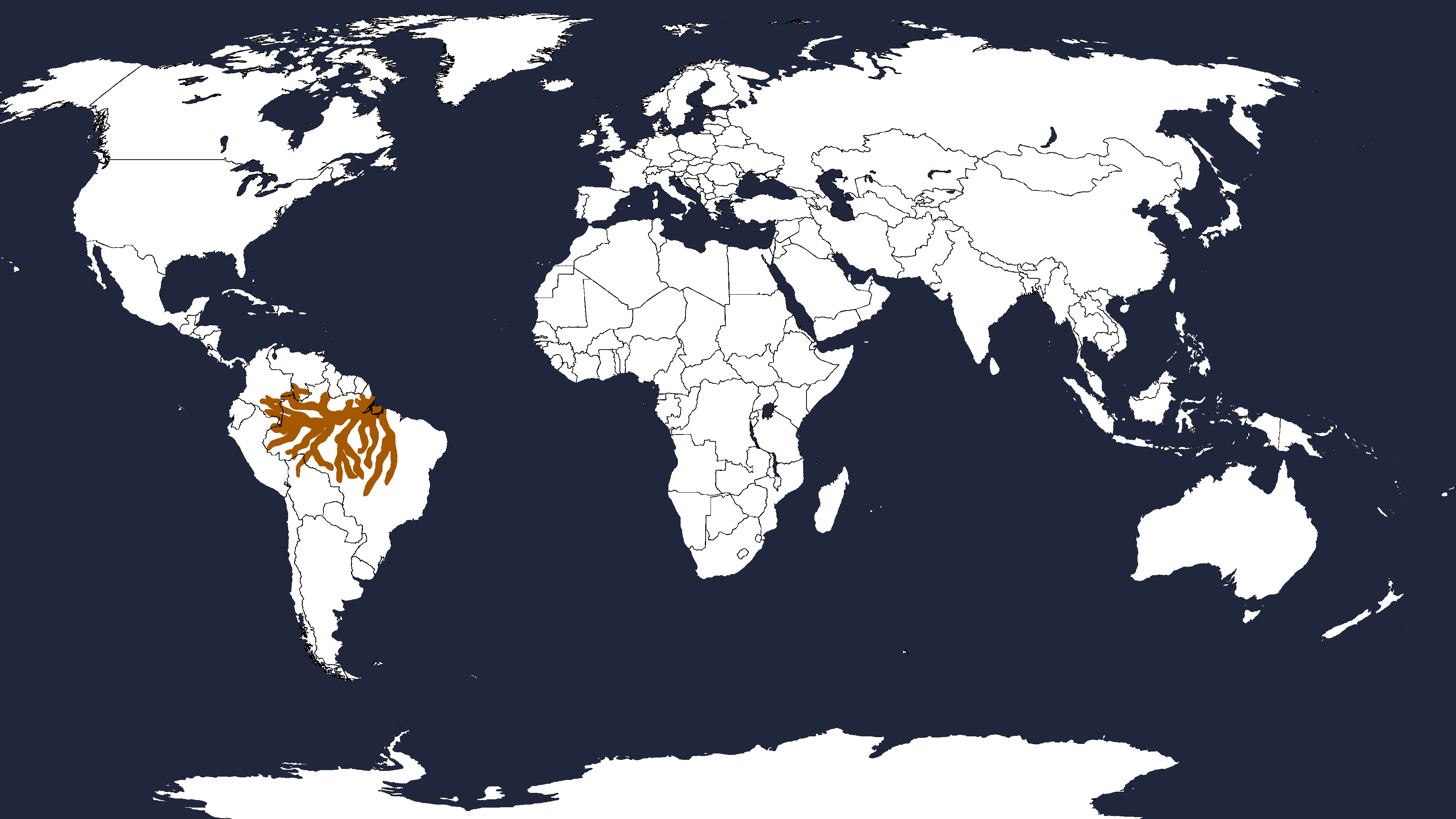

Synonyms
- Myletes maculatus Kner, 1858

= Metynnis maculatus =

Species of fish

Metynnis maculatus, the spotted metynnis, is a species of freshwater ray-finned fishes belonging to the family Serrasalmidae, which includes the pacus, piranhas and related fishes. This fish is found in Argentina and Brazil, and possibly in Bolivia, Paraguay, and Peru. It is one of the species of fish known in the aquarium trade as the "silver dollar".
