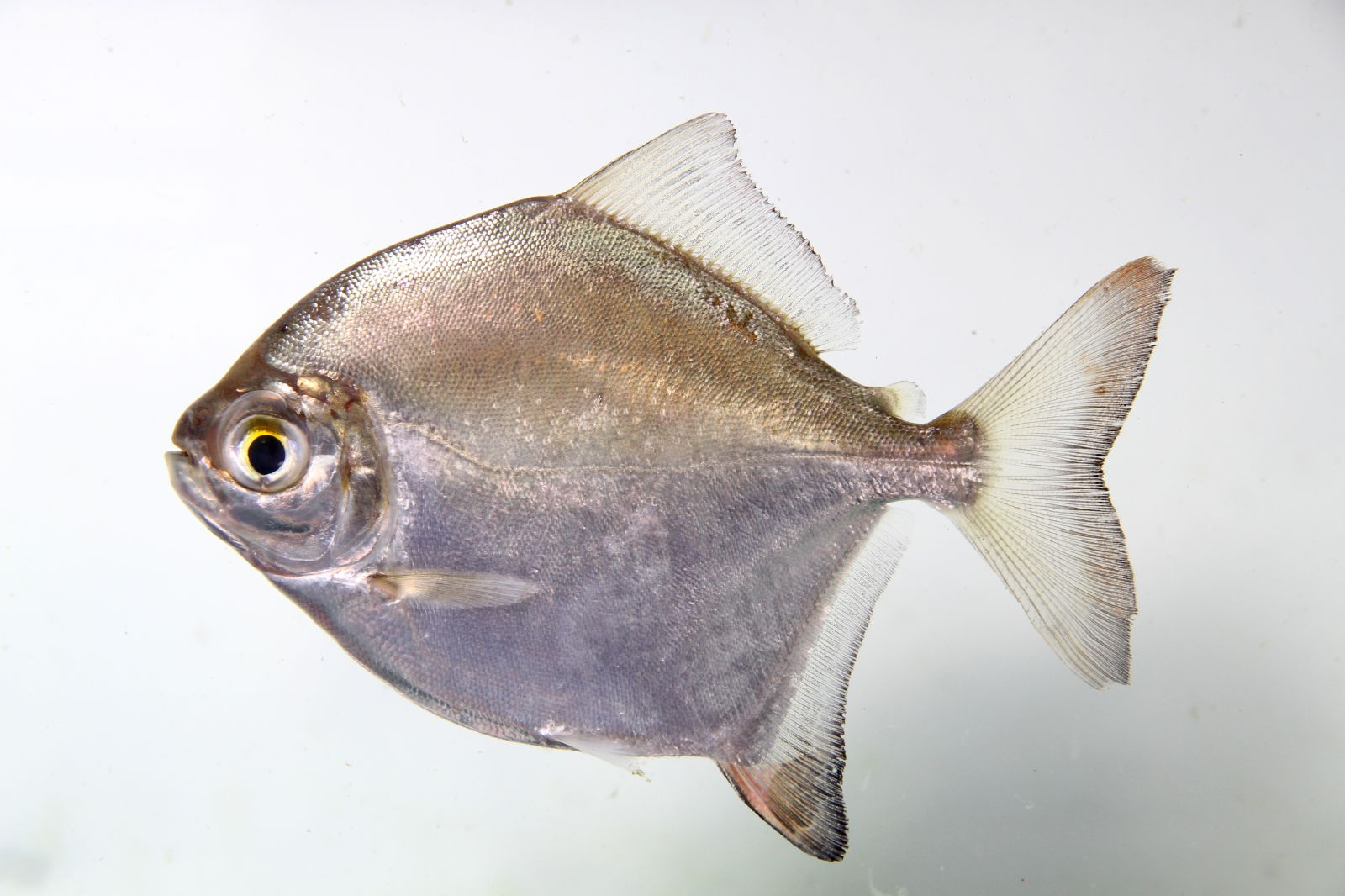
- Myloplus rubripinnis

Scientific classification
- Kingdom: Animalia
- Phylum: Chordata
- Class: Actinopterygii
- Order: Characiformes
- Family: Serrasalmidae
- Subfamily: Myleinae
- Genus: Myloplus; T. N. Gill, 1896

Type species
- Myletes asterias J. P. Müller & Troschel, 1844

Synonyms
- Orthomyleus C. H. Eigenmann, 1903

= Myloplus =

Genus of fishes

Myloplus is a genus of freshwater fish in the family Serrasalmidae found in tropical and subtropical South America, where they inhabit rivers and streams (both slow and fast-flowing). They are primarily herbivores, but also take some animal matter. Depending on the exact species, they reach up to 16–56 cm (0.5–1.8 ft) in standard length. Adult males have a double-lobed anal fin and filamentous extensions on the dorsal fin, and both sexes (but especially males) can be brightly colored when breeding.

== Species ==
Myloplus contains the following species:

- Myloplus animacula Soares, Andrade & Lucinda, 2023
- Myloplus arnoldi C. G. E. Ahl, 1936
- Myloplus asterias (J. P. Müller & Troschel, 1844)
- Myloplus aylan Pereira, R. P. Ota, V. N. Machado, R. A. Collins, M. C. Andrade, Garcia-Ayala, Jégu, I. P. Farias & Hrbek, 2024
- Myloplus levis (C. H. Eigenmann & McAtee, 1907)
- Myloplus lobatus (Valenciennes, 1850)
- Myloplus lucienae Andrade, Ota, Bastos & Jégu, 2016
- Myloplus nigrolineatus Ota, Machado, Andrade, Collins, Farias & Hrbek, 2020 (Blackline myleus)
- Myloplus rubripinnis (J. P. Müller & Troschel, 1844) (Redhook myleus)
- Myloplus sauron Pereira, Ota, Machado, Collins, Ândrade, Garcia-Ayala, Jégu, Farias & Hrbek, 2024
- Myloplus schomburgkii (Jardine, 1841) (Disk tetra)
- Myloplus tiete (C. H. Eigenmann & A. A. Norris, 1900)
- Myloplus torquatus (Kner, 1858)
- Myloplus tumukumak Andrade, Jégu & Gama, 2018
- Myloplus zorroi Andrade, Jégu & Giarrizzo, 2016
