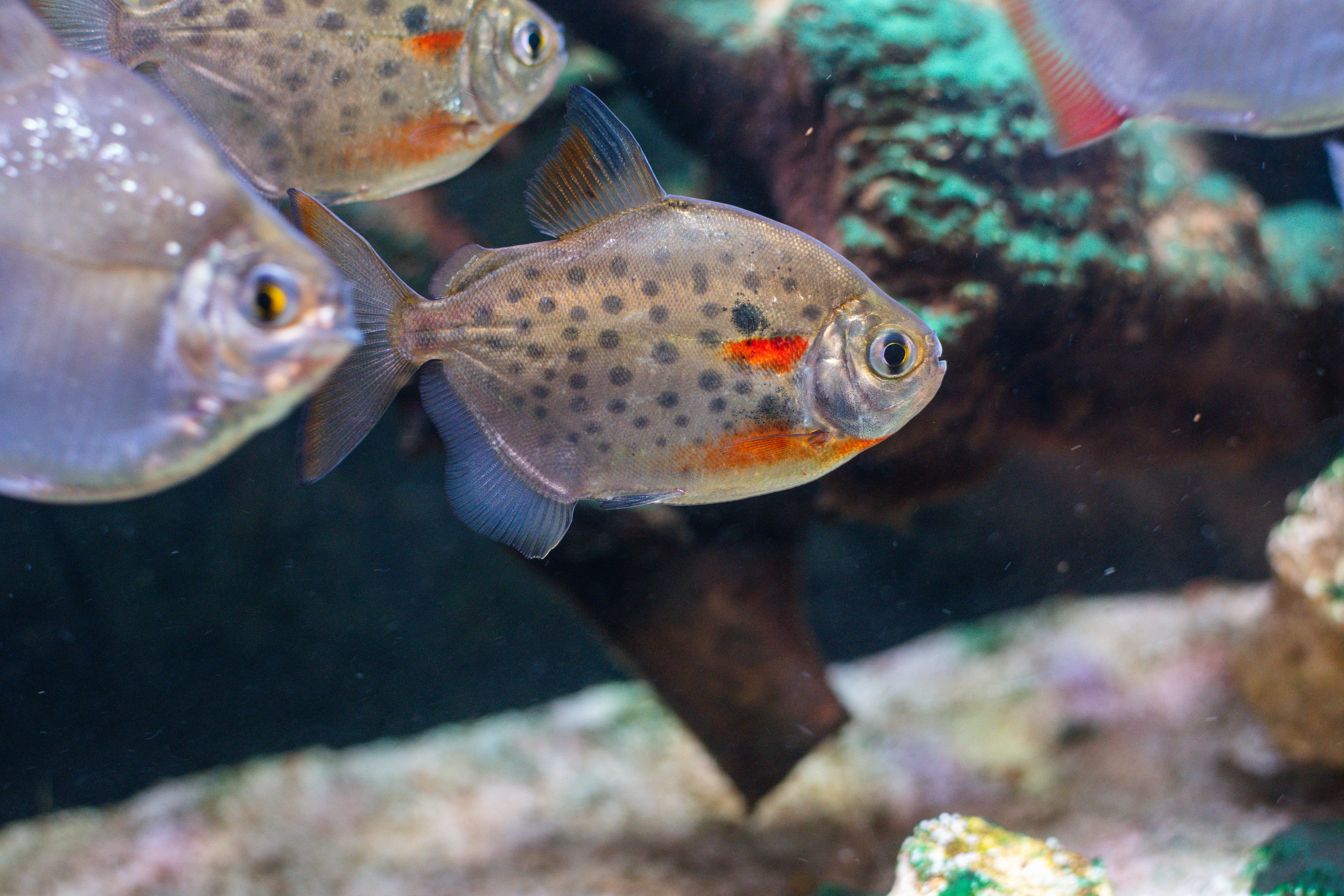
- A male spotted silver dollar showing mating colouration

Conservation status
- Least Concern (IUCN 3.1)

Scientific classification
- Kingdom: Animalia
- Phylum: Chordata
- Class: Actinopterygii
- Order: Characiformes
- Family: Serrasalmidae
- Genus: Metynnis
- Species: M. lippincottianus

Binomial name
- Metynnis lippincottianus (Cope, 1870)

Synonyms
- Myletes lippinocottianus Cope, 1870; Metynnis goeldi C. H. Eigenmann, 1903; Myletes (Myleus) orbicularis Steindachner, 1908; Metynnis roosevelti C. H. Eigenmann, 1915; Metynnis seitzi Ahl, 1924; Matynnis heinrothi Ahl, 1924; Metynnis snethlageae Ahl, 1924; Metynnis dungerni Ahl, 1924

= Metynnis lippincottianus =

Species of fish

Metynnis lippincottianus, commonly known as the spotted silver dollar, is a species of freshwater ray-finned fishes belonging to the family Serrasalmidae, which includes the pacus, piranhas and related fishes. This fish is found in the Brazilian Amazon and multiple rivers of French Guiana. An average M. lippincottianus can grow to a length of 13 cm.

The fish is named in honor of Cope's friend, James S. Lippincott (1819–1885), who made contributions to Meteorology, Agriculture and other studies.
