= Waldo Lee McAtee =

American ecologist and ornithologist

- Born: 21 January 1883; Jalapa, Indiana, USA
- Died: January 7, 1962 (aged 78); Chapel Hill, North Carolina, USA
- Education: Indiana University Bloomington
- Known for: founding editor of Wildlife Review and Journal of Wildlife Management
- Awards: honorary Doctor of Science degree, Indiana University
- Scientific career
- Fields: Ornithology

Waldo Lee McAtee (21 January 1883 – 7 January 1962) was an American ecologist and ornithologist. He wrote extensively about the feeding habits of birds and mammals and described over 460 new species of insects.

== Early life and education ==
Waldo Lee McAtee was born on January 21, 1883, in Jalapa, Indiana. McAtee was a student at Indiana University Bloomington from 1900 to 1906, majoring in Biology and Zoology. He earned his Bachelor of Arts (A.B.) in 1904 and his Master of Arts (A.M.) in 1906. McAtee was a very active student at Indiana University Bloomington. He served as curator for the Indiana University Bloomington Zoological Museum, where his duties included classifying specimens. When professors were absent, McAtee was often called upon to teach science classes such as Embryology. He was also an active participant in Indiana University. athletic events, particularly football games. McAtee served as a yell leader over a group called the "Howling Hundred", where he rallied students to attend games and even wrote fight songs to taunt the opposing team. During his studies, McAtee spent a summer working in Washington, D.C. rearranging a collection of North American and Mexican bird specimens. This summer job introduced McAtee to members of the United States Department of Agriculture, who offered him a position while he was still an undergraduate.

== Career ==
McAtee served his professional career from 1904 to 1947 with the Bureau of Biological Survey of the US Department of Agriculture, and later in the successor agency, the United States Fish and Wildlife Service. He studied birds and their feeding habits. McAtee helped develop the Division of Food Habits Research within the Bureau of Biological Survey and served as its first director. Along with this duty, he served as the editor of the technical publications of the Biological Survey team. In 1935, McAtee created an abstracting service for scientific publications which was called "Wildlife Review". He served as the editor for Wildlife Review from 1935 to 1947.This publication is now known as the Wildlife & Ecology Studies Worldwide indexes. He contributed to over 750 publications. During World War II, McAtee edited all the publications of the Fish and Wildlife Service.

McAtee was instrumental in the creation of The Wildlife Society, a scientific and educational association based in Washington, D.C. dedicated to the promotion of wildlife management. He also played a role in the establishment of the Journal of Wildlife Management, serving as its first editor. McAtee active in the American Ornithologists' Union where he served as treasurer for many years. He was a fellow of the American Association for the Advancement of Science. McAtee served as a technical advisor on the Scientific Consulting Board for "Nature Magazine", a publication of the American Nature Association.

McAtee was the author of over 1000 papers on topics from ornithology to botany. He wrote approximately 750 publications concerning the food of birds. McAtee also wrote about the natural history of the District of Columbia. His work helped him gain worldwide acclaim as a biologist and ornithologist. McAtee's research was also influential in helping to establish many of the nation's bird protection laws.

In addition to his scientific interests, McAtee was interested in folklore and poetry. He researched folk speech and folk remedies of the settlers of Indiana and published some papers on his research. McAtee published a collection of his poetry in a pamphlet entitled "Verses".

== Retirement and death ==
McAtee retired in 1947 and lived in Chapel Hill, North Carolina until he died from stomach cancer on January 7, 1962, at the age of 78.

== Honors and awards ==
McAtee received numerous honors and awards throughout his career. He received the Distinguished Service Award from the U.S. Department of the Interior for his scientific accomplishments. In 1938, McAtee was named one of the 130 zoologists to be "starred" in the magazine "American Men of Science", having been voted by his colleagues as an outstanding scientist in the field. He was elected as a Fellow of the American Ornithologists' Union. In June 1961, McAtee received an Honorary Doctor of Science degree from his alma mater Indiana University.

== See also ==
- Cattle egret
- Category:Taxa named by Waldo Lee McAtee
