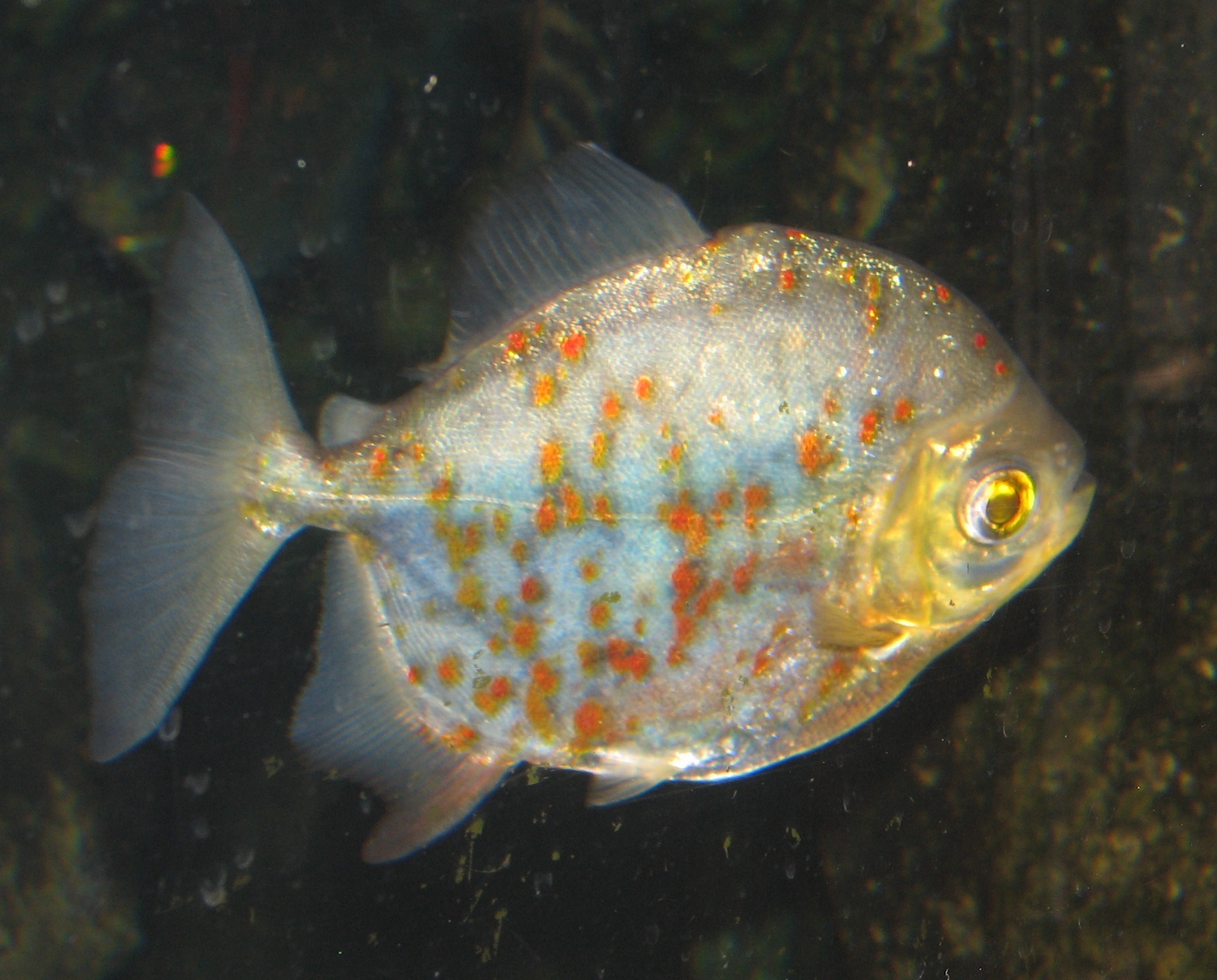

Conservation status
- Least Concern (IUCN 3.1)

Scientific classification
- Kingdom: Animalia
- Phylum: Chordata
- Class: Actinopterygii
- Order: Characiformes
- Family: Serrasalmidae
- Genus: Myloplus
- Species: M. rubripinnis

Binomial name
- Myloplus rubripinnis (Müller & Troschel, 1844)

Synonyms
- Myletes rubripinnis Müller & Troschel, 1844; Myleus rubripinnis (Müller & Troschel, 1844); Myletes luna Valenciennes, 1850

= Redhook myleus =

Species of fish

The redhook myleus or redhook silver dollar (Myloplus rubripinnis) is a medium-sized omnivorous fish in the family Serrasalmidae. It is from South America, where it is found in the Amazon and Orinoco basins, as well as rivers of the Guiana Shield. This species schools often and is peaceful; despite that, it is capable of delivering serious bites to humans.

== Etymology ==
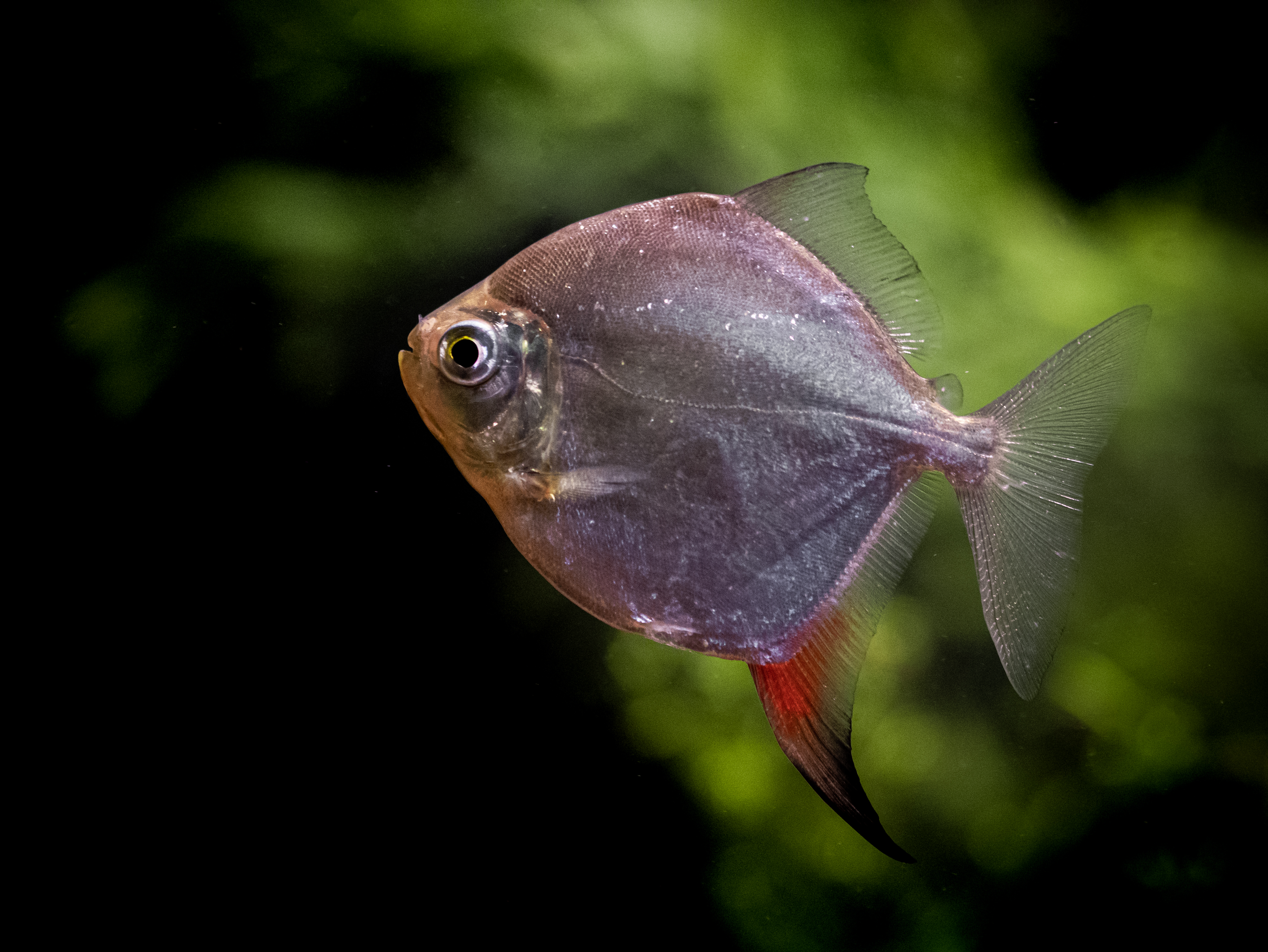
A redhook myleus. Note the anal fin characteristic of their name.

Both the term "redhook" in the common name and the specific epithet are references to the fact that the anal fin of this fish is (largely) red.
