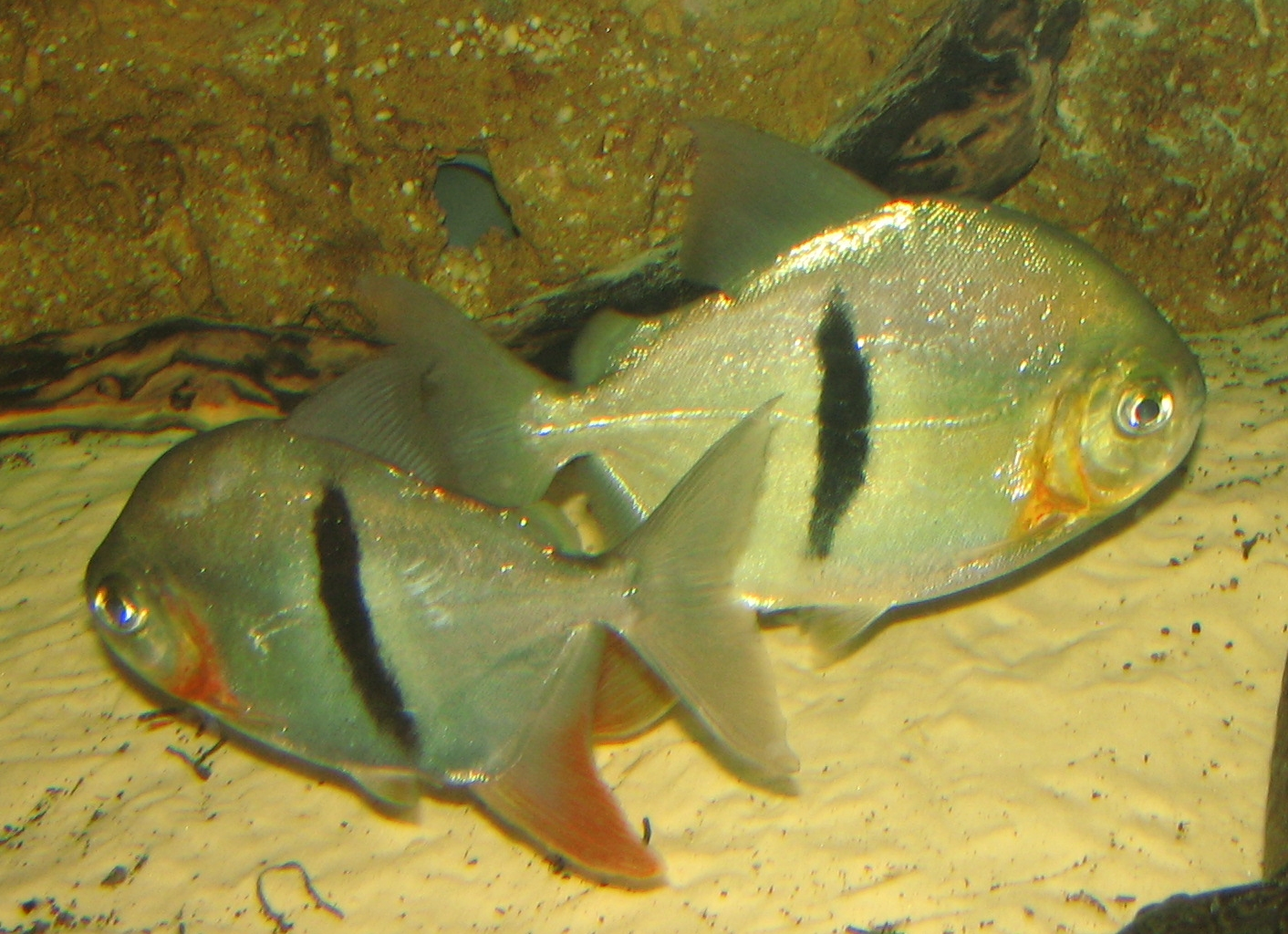

Scientific classification
- Kingdom: Animalia
- Phylum: Chordata
- Class: Actinopterygii
- Order: Characiformes
- Family: Serrasalmidae
- Genus: Myloplus
- Species: M. schomburgkii

Binomial name
- Myloplus schomburgkii (Jardine, 1841)

Synonyms
- Tetragonopterus schomburgkii Jardine, 1841; Myleus schomburgkii (Jardine 1841); Myletes schomburgkii Valenciennes, 1850; Myletes palometa Valenciennes, 1850

= Myloplus schomburgkii =

Species of fish

Myloplus schomburgkii, also known as the disk tetra, disk pacu, black-ear pacu, black-band myleus or black-barred myleus, is a species of serrasalmid with a black bar on its side. This species is found in the middle and lower Amazon River basin, Nanay River, upper Orinoco River basin in Brazil, Peru, Venezuela and possibly in Suriname.

== Etymology ==
The fish is named in honor of explorer Robert Hermann Schomburgk (1804–1865), who provided notes and illustration to the describer, upon which the description is based, as no type specimen is known.

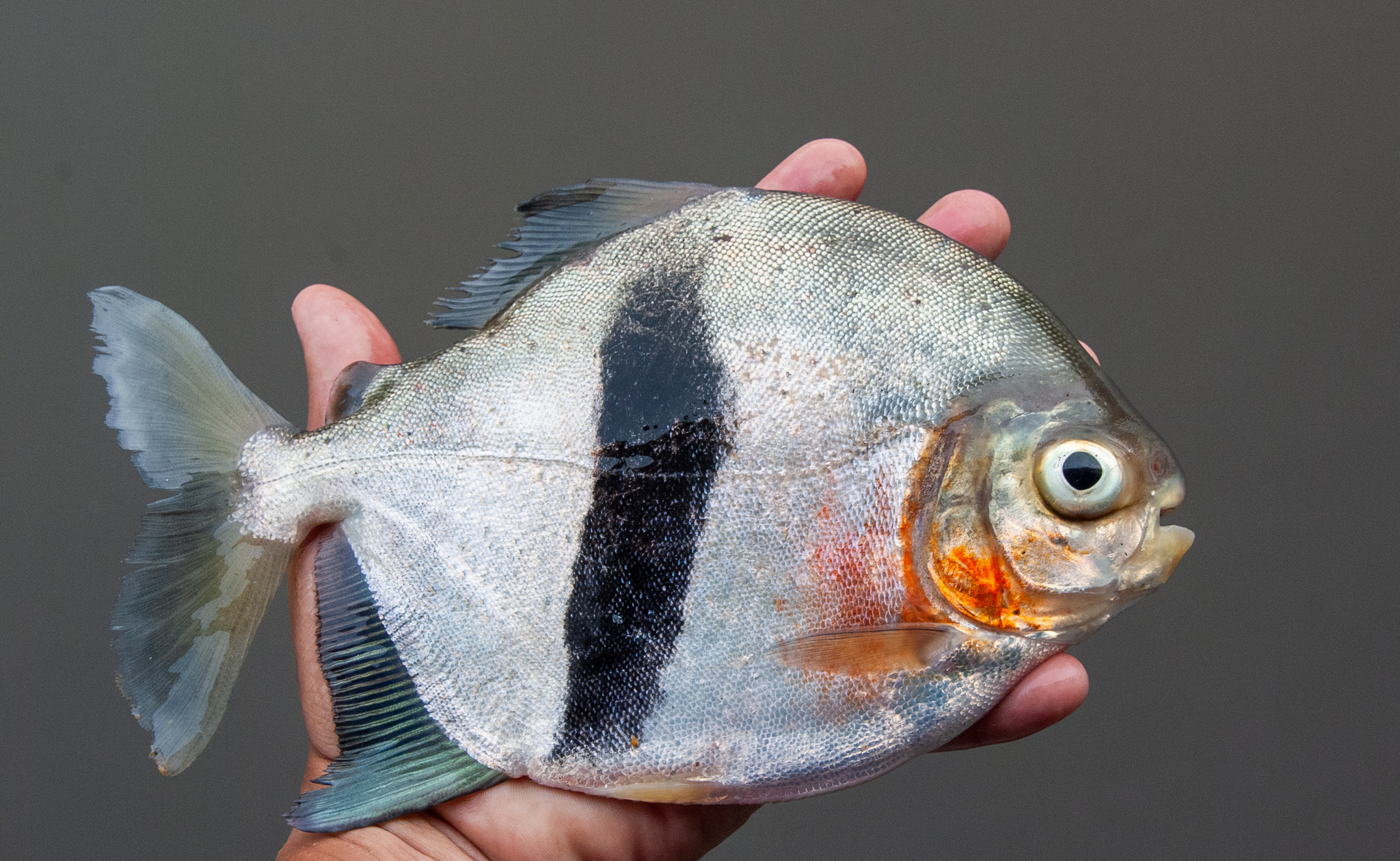
Amazonas, Brazil

== In the aquarium ==
This fish is of minor importance as a food fish in addition to its use as an aquarium fish. In an aquarium, the disk tetra grows to 40 cm (16 in). It prefers a pH of 5.0 to 7.0 and a temperature of 23 to 27 °C (73 to 81 °F). They are related to pacus and piranhas. They primarily eat fruits, small fish, crustaceans, clams and snails. This fish is capable of delivering serious bites.
