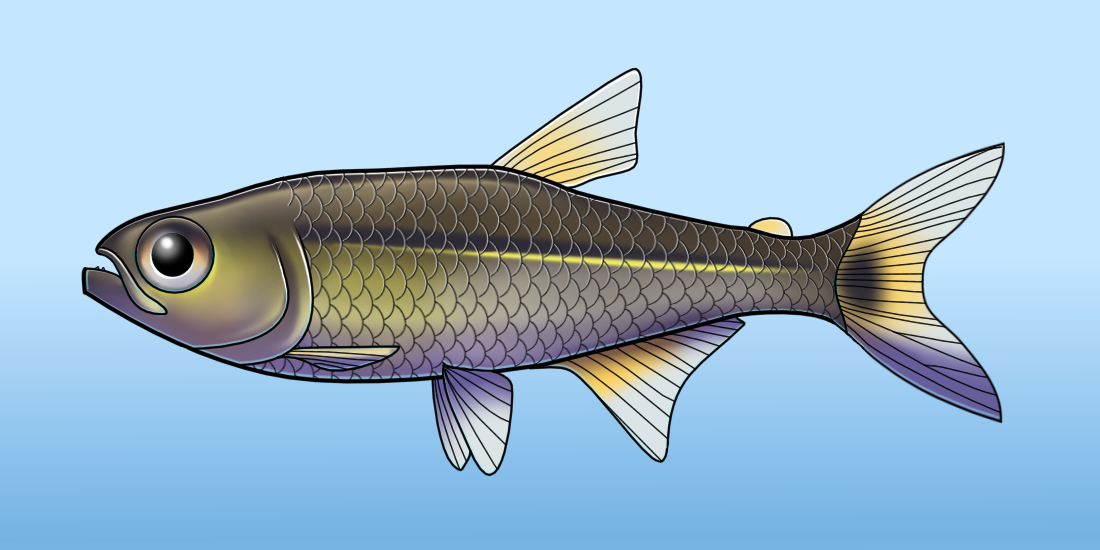

Conservation status
- Least Concern (IUCN 3.1)

Scientific classification
- Kingdom: Animalia
- Phylum: Chordata
- Class: Actinopterygii
- Order: Characiformes
- Family: Acestrorhamphidae
- Genus: Parapristella
- Species: P. aubynei

Binomial name
- Parapristella aubynei (C. H. Eigenmann, 1909)

Synonyms
- Pristella aubynei C.H. Eigenmann, 1909

= Parapristella aubynei =

Species of fish

Parapristella aubynei is a species of freshwater ray-finned fish belonging to the family Acestrorhamphidae, the American characins. This fish is found in South America where it occurs in the coastal drainages of Guyana, and in the Essequibo River.
