= Parapristella georgiae =

Conservation status
- Least Concern (IUCN 3.1)

Scientific classification
- Kingdom: Animalia
- Phylum: Chordata
- Class: Actinopterygii
- Order: Characiformes
- Family: Acestrorhamphidae
- Genus: Parapristella
- Species: P. georgiae

Binomial name
- Parapristella georgiae Géry, 1964

Species of fish

Parapristella georgiae is a species of freshwater ray-finned fish belonging to the family Acestrorhamphidae, the American characins. This fish is found in South America where it occurs in the Orinioco and Rio Negro drainages in Brazil, Colombia and Venezuela.
