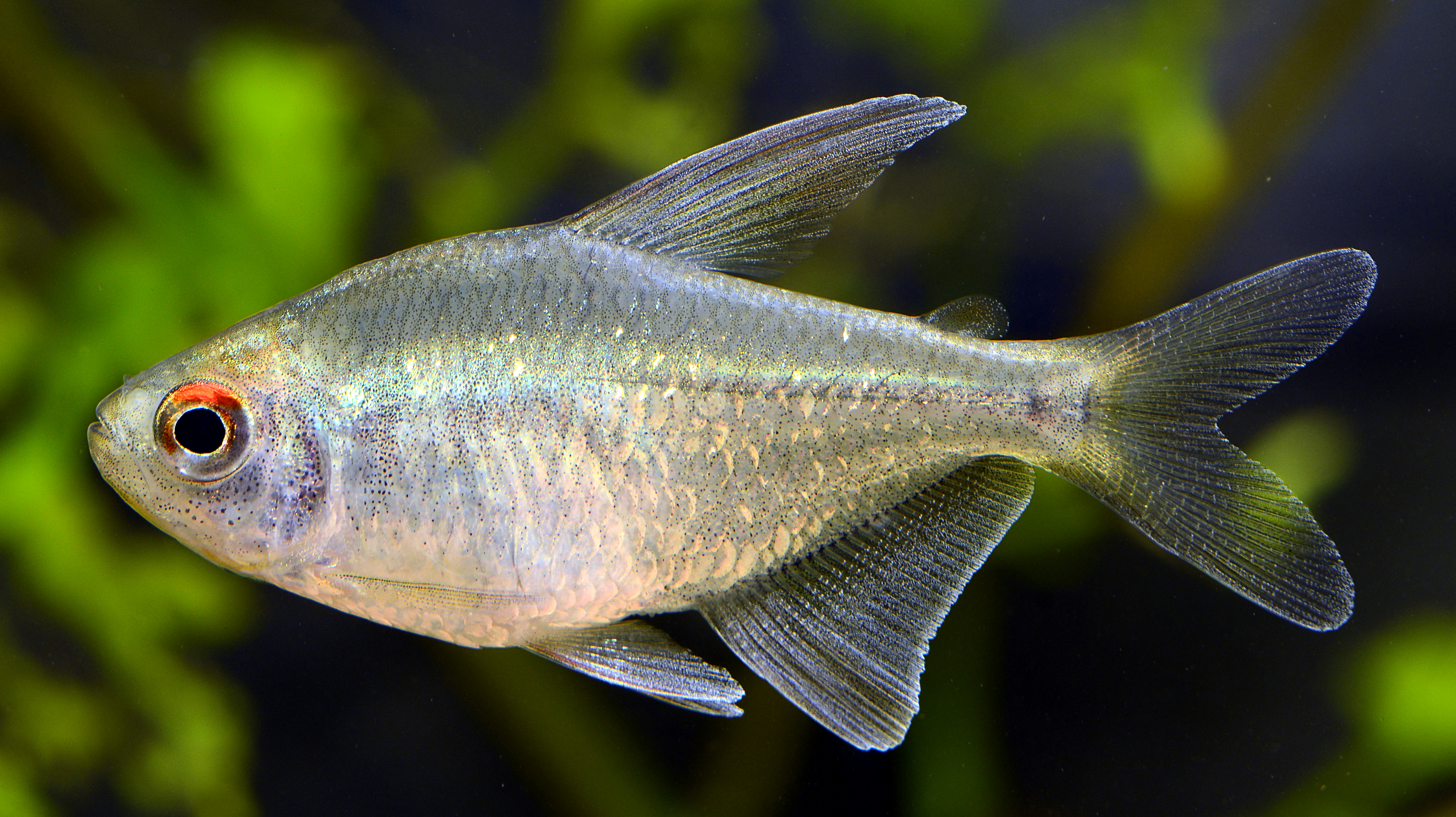

Conservation status
- Endangered (IUCN 3.1)

Scientific classification
- Kingdom: Animalia
- Phylum: Chordata
- Class: Actinopterygii
- Division: Teleostei
- Order: Characiformes
- Family: Acestrorhamphidae
- Subfamily: Megalamphodinae
- Genus: Makunaima
- Species: M. pittieri

Binomial name
- Makunaima pittieri (C. H. Eigenmann, 1920)

Synonyms
- Moenkhausia pittieri Eigenmann, 1920

= Diamond tetra =

Species of fish

The diamond tetra (Makunaima pittieri) is a species freshwater ray-finned fish belonging to the family Acestrorhamphidae, the American tetras. This species is found in and around Lake Valencia in Venezuela.

== Taxonomy ==
The diamond tetra was first formally described as Moenkhausia pittieri in 1920 by the German-born American Carl H. Eigenmann, with its type locality given as "Concejo, Río Tiquirito, Venezuela". This species is now classified in the genus Makunaima, which was proposed by Guillermo Enrique Terán, Mauricio F. Benítez and Juan Marcos Mirande in 2020. In 1935, Ernst Ahl described a new species which he named Opisthanodus haerteli and for which he gave a type locality of the Para River in Brazil. However, this was an error, as the holotype was an aquarium import. This taxon has been regraded as a synonym of Moenkhausia pittieri. If this synonymy is correct, then Opisthanodus is the senior synonym of Makunaima. However, Opisthanodus haerteli and Opisthanodus are both now regarded as nomina dubia. The genus Makunaima is classified within the subfamily Megalamphodinae, the red tetras, of the American tetra family Acestrorhamphidae within the suborder Characoidei of the order Characiformes.

== Etymology ==
The diamond tetra is classified within the genus Makunaima, this name being that of a creation god in the mythology of a number of Amazonian tribes. Makunaima created the animals and a great tree which gave rise to all the food plants. The specific name was not explained by Eigenmann but most likely honours the Swiss-born geographer and botanist Henri François Pittier, a Venezualan resident who collected some specimens for Eigenmann.

== Description ==
A male diamond tetra in a planted aquarium

Male diamond tetras tend to be larger than the females, and have a greater number of the reflective scales that the common name of this species refer to. As these fishes mature their pelvic, dorsal and anal fins become elongated, developing a violet sheen in males and being translucent in females. This species has a maximum standard length of 6.0 cm (2.4 in).

== Distribution and habitat ==
Diamond tetras are endemic to the northern area of Venezuela, where they are only found in Lake Valencia, located between the states of Carabobo and Aragua, and its tributaries. They inhabit slow moving streams with abundant vegetation and leaf litter. These fish are threatened by urban growth, which destroys and pollutes their habitat. The species has seemingly disappeared completely from Lake Valencia, where they were collected initially. In 2009, the Venezuelan underwater photographer Ivan Mikolji was able to find and photograph a population of this fish in a stream near Lake Valencia.

== Utilisation ==
The diamond tetra is bred for export in the aquarium trade.
