= Ramirezella =

Ramirezella may refer to:

- Ramirezella (fish), a genus of fishes in the family Acestrorhamphidae
- Ramirezella (foramiinfera), a genus of protists in the family Spirocyclinidae
- Ramirezella (plant), a genus of plants in the family Fabaceae
