= Priocharax nanus =

Conservation status
- Least Concern (IUCN 3.1)

Scientific classification
- Kingdom: Animalia
- Phylum: Chordata
- Class: Actinopterygii
- Order: Characiformes
- Family: Acestrorhamphidae
- Genus: Priocharax
- Species: P. nanus

Binomial name
- Priocharax nanus (Toledo-Piza, Mattox & Britz, 2014)

Species of fish

Priocharax nanus is a minute species of freshwater ray-finned fish belonging to the family Acestrorhamphidae, the American characins. This fish is found in the Rio Negro, Brazil. The species, which has a skeleton of cartilage, is almost completely transparent. It grows to a maximum length of 15.6 millimeters.
