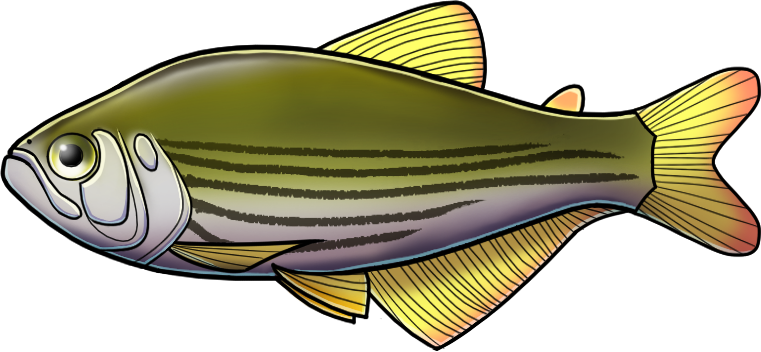
- illustration

Conservation status
- Least Concern (IUCN 3.1)

Scientific classification
- Kingdom: Animalia
- Phylum: Chordata
- Class: Actinopterygii
- Order: Characiformes
- Family: Acestrorhamphidae
- Genus: Hollandichthys
- Species: H. multifasciatus

Binomial name
- Hollandichthys multifasciatus (C. H. Eigenmann & A. A. Norris, 1900)

Synonyms
- Tetragonopterus multifasciatus C. H. Eigenmann & A. A. Norris, 1900; Pseudochalceus perstriatus A. Miranda-Ribeiro, 1908; Pseudochalceus affinis Steindachner, 1908

= Hollandichthys multifasciatus =

Species of fish

Hollandichthys multifasciatus, the lined golden tetra, is a species of freshwater ray-finned fish belonging to the family Acestrorhamphidae, the American characins. This species is found in tropical South America. It inhabits coastal rivers of southern Brazil, where it occurs from the state of Rio de Janeiro to the state of Rio Grande do Sul. Although there are claimed records from Uruguay, these are likely erroneous.

This species can reach 9.6 cm (3.8 in) in standard length. It has been reported to feed on insects (both aquatic and terrestrial), decapods, oligochaetes, spiders, and plant material.
