= Priocharax varii =

Scientific classification
- Kingdom: Animalia
- Phylum: Chordata
- Class: Actinopterygii
- Order: Characiformes
- Family: Acestrorhamphidae
- Genus: Priocharax
- Species: P. varii

Binomial name
- Priocharax varii Mattox, Souza, Toledo-Piza, Britz & Oliveira, 2020

Species of fish

Priocharax varii is a species of freshwater ray-finned fish belonging to the family Acestrorhamphidae, the American characins. This fish is found in Brazil.

== Etymology ==
The fish is named in honor of the American ichthyologist Richard P. Vari.
