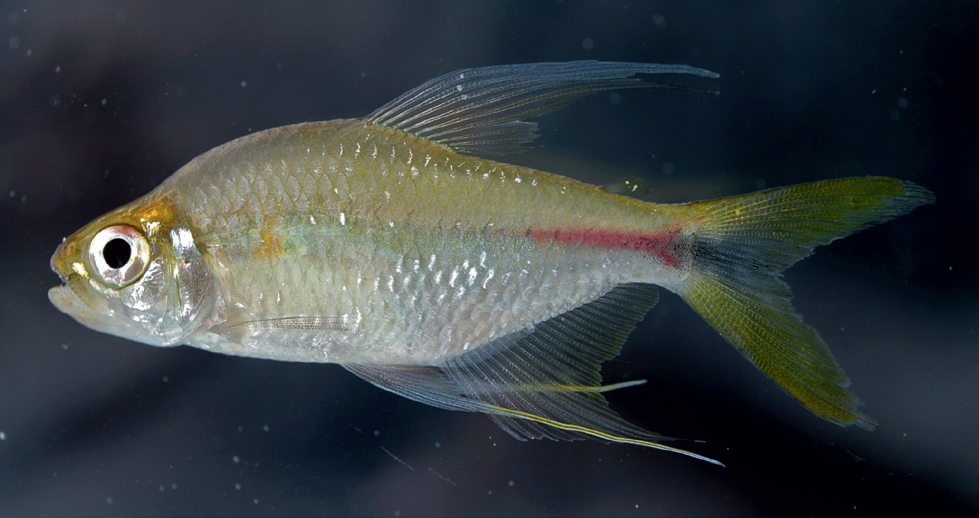

Conservation status
- Least Concern (IUCN 3.1)

Scientific classification
- Kingdom: Animalia
- Phylum: Chordata
- Class: Actinopterygii
- Order: Characiformes
- Family: Acestrorhamphidae
- Genus: Nematocharax
- Species: N. venustus

Binomial name
- Nematocharax venustus S. H. Weitzman, Menezes & Britski, 1986

Synonyms
- Nematocharax costai Bragança, Barbosa & Mattos, 2013

= Nematocharax venustus =

Species of fish

Nematocharax venustus is a species of freshwater ray-finned fish belonging to the family Acestrorhamphidae, the American characins. This species is endemic to Brazil, where it is found in the Jequitinhonha River basin. The males of this species can reach a length of 5.1 centimetres (2.0 in) SL while the females only grow to 3.5 centimetres (1.4 in) SL.
