= Priocharax pygmaeus =

Conservation status
- Least Concern (IUCN 3.1)

Scientific classification
- Kingdom: Animalia
- Phylum: Chordata
- Class: Actinopterygii
- Order: Characiformes
- Family: Acestrorhamphidae
- Genus: Priocharax
- Species: P. pygmaeus

Binomial name
- Priocharax pygmaeus S. H. Weitzman & Vari, 1987

Species of fish

Priocharax pygmaeus is a minute species of freshwater ray-finned fish belonging to the family Acestrorhamphidae, the American characins. This fish is found in the Upper Amazon River basin in Colombia. It has also been recorded from the Río Ucayali basin in Peru. The species, which has a skeleton of cartilage, is almost completely transparent.

== Size ==
This species reaches a length of 1.7 cm (0.67 in).

== Etymology ==
The fish's name is Latin for "dwarfish".

== Biology ==
Priocharax pygmaeus inhabits rainforest streams that are shaded or partially shaded. The bottom of the streams are clay with a lot of leaf litter, and submerged plants are not present.
