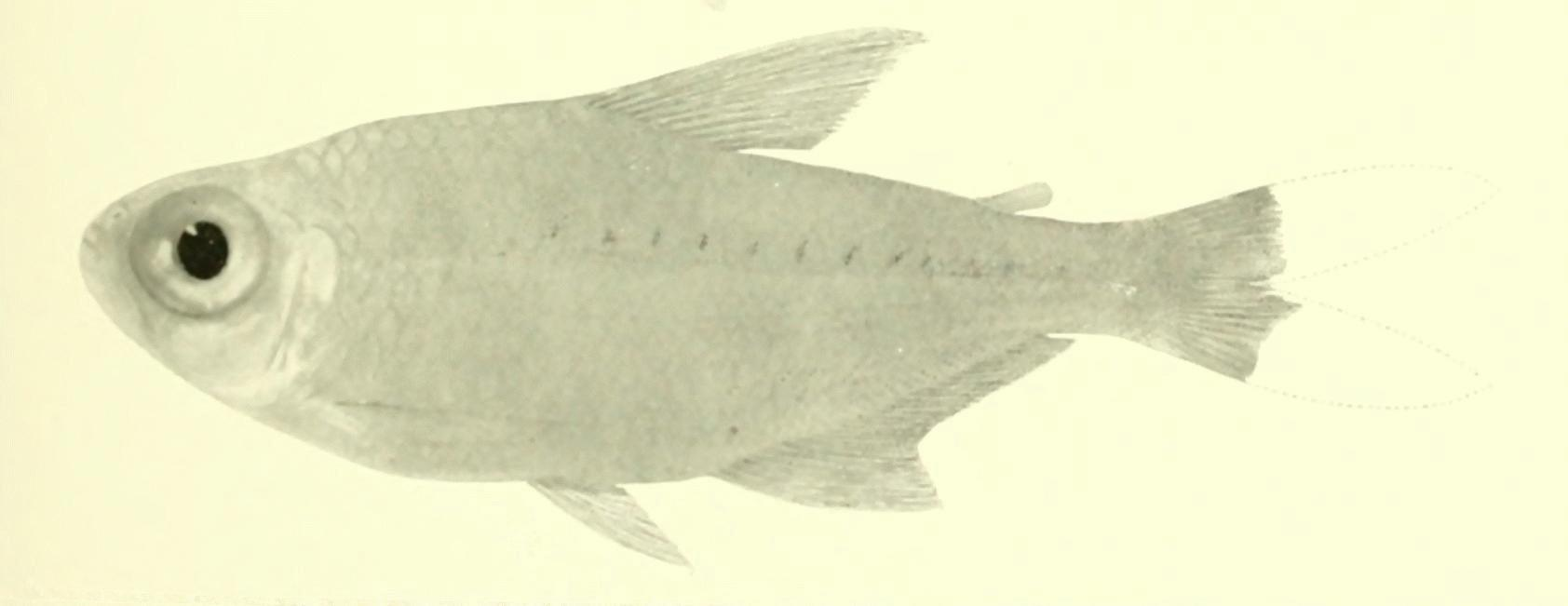

Conservation status
- Least Concern (IUCN 3.1)

Scientific classification
- Kingdom: Animalia
- Phylum: Chordata
- Class: Actinopterygii
- Order: Characiformes
- Family: Acestrorhamphidae
- Subfamily: Megalamphodinae
- Genus: Makunaima
- Species: M. guaporensis

Binomial name
- Makunaima guaporensis (C. H. Eigenmann, 1911)

Synonyms
- Astyanax guaporensis C.H. Eigenmann 1911

= Makunaima guaporensis =

Species of fish

Makunaima guaporensis is a species of freshwater ray-finned fish belonging to the family Acestrorhamphidae, the American tetras. This species is endemic to the Rio Madeira drainage system in Bolivia and Brazil. M. guaporensis was first formally described as Astyanax guaporensis in 1911 by the German-born American ichthyologist Carl H. Eigenmann, with its type locality given as the Rio Guaporé at Maciel, Brazil. In 2020, it was designated as the type species of the new genus Makunaima by the Argentine ichthyologists Guillermo Enrique Terán, Mauricio F. Benítez and Juan Marcos Mirande. Makunaima is classified within the subfamily Megalamphodinae, the red tetras, of the American tetra family Acestrorhamphidae within the suborder Characoidei of the order Characiformes.
