= Priocharax robbiei =

Scientific classification
- Kingdom: Animalia
- Phylum: Chordata
- Class: Actinopterygii
- Order: Characiformes
- Family: Acestrorhamphidae
- Genus: Priocharax
- Species: P. robbiei

Binomial name
- Priocharax robbiei Silva Lopez, Souza, Reia, Mantuaneli, Morales, F. C. T. Lima, de Oliveira & Mattox, 2025

Species of fish

Priocharax robbiei is a minute species of fish native to the Rio Purus and Solimões Draina, Brazil. The species, which has a skeleton of cartilage, is almost completely transparent.

== Size ==
This species reaches a length of 1.6 cm (0.63 in).

== Etymology ==
The fish is named in honor of Roberto "Robbie" Taliaferro Mattox Jr., who was the father of Mattox, who died while his son was in the field collecting fish and when the type series was found.
