= Priocharax phasma =

Scientific classification
- Kingdom: Animalia
- Phylum: Chordata
- Class: Actinopterygii
- Order: Characiformes
- Family: Acestrorhamphidae
- Genus: Priocharax
- Species: P. phasma

Binomial name
- Priocharax phasma Mattox, F. C. T. Lima, Britz, Souza & Oliveira, 2024

Species of fish

Priocharax phasma is a minute species of freshwater ray-finned fish belonging to the family Acestrorhamphidae, the American characins. This fish is found in Brazil.

== Size ==
This species reaches a length of 1.4 cm (0.55 in).

== Etymology ==
The fish's name means "phásma" in Greek, φάσμα, which is a ghost or a specter, referring to its almost completely transparent appearance, resembling that of a ghost.
