= Nematocharax varii =

Scientific classification
- Kingdom: Animalia
- Phylum: Chordata
- Class: Actinopterygii
- Order: Characiformes
- Family: Acestrorhamphidae
- Genus: Nematocharax
- Species: N. varii

Binomial name
- Nematocharax varii Barreto, Silva, Batalha‐Filho, Affonso & Zanata, 2018

Species of fishes

Nematocharax varii is a species of freshwater ray-finned fish belonging to the family Acestrorhamphidae, the American characins. It is endemic to Brazil, where it is found in the Upper De Contas River basin. The specific name honours Richard P. Vari.
