= Priocharax britzi =

Scientific classification
- Kingdom: Animalia
- Phylum: Chordata
- Class: Actinopterygii
- Order: Characiformes
- Family: Acestrorhamphidae
- Genus: Priocharax
- Species: P. britzi

Binomial name
- Priocharax britzi Mattox, Souza, Toledo-Piza & Oliveira, 2021

Species of fish

Priocharax britzi is a minute species of freshwater ray-finned fish belonging to the family Acestrorhamphidae, the American characins. This fish is found in the Rio Negro, Brazil. The species, which has a skeleton of cartilage, is almost completely transparent.

== Size ==
This species reaches a length of 1.4 cm (0.55 in).

== Etymology ==
The fish is named in honor of Ralf Britz, Natural History Museum (London), who described two species in the genus Priocharax.
