= Priocharax marupiara =

Conservation status
- Data Deficient (IUCN 3.1)

Scientific classification
- Kingdom: Animalia
- Phylum: Chordata
- Class: Actinopterygii
- Order: Characiformes
- Family: Acestrorhamphidae
- Genus: Priocharax
- Species: P. marupiara

Binomial name
- Priocharax marupiara Mattox, Britz, Souza, A.L.S. Casas, F. C. T. Lima & Oliveira, 2023

Species of fish

Priocharax marupiara is a minute species of freshwater ray-finned fish belonging to the family Acestrorhamphidae, the American characins. This fish is found in Brazil.

== Size ==
This species reaches a length of 1.7 cm (0.67 in).

== Etymology ==
The fish's name means, in the Nheengatu native common language, "luck" or "lucky in fishing", and in life in general.
