= Priocharax ariel =

Conservation status
- Least Concern (IUCN 3.1)

Scientific classification
- Kingdom: Animalia
- Phylum: Chordata
- Class: Actinopterygii
- Order: Characiformes
- Family: Acestrorhamphidae
- Genus: Priocharax
- Species: P. ariel

Binomial name
- Priocharax ariel S. H. Weitzman & Vari, 1987

Species of fish

Priocharax ariel is a species of freshwater ray-finned fish belonging to the family Acestrorhamphidae, the American characins. This fish is found in the Rio Negro, Rio Madeira and Orinoco river basins in Brazil, Colombia and Venezuela.
