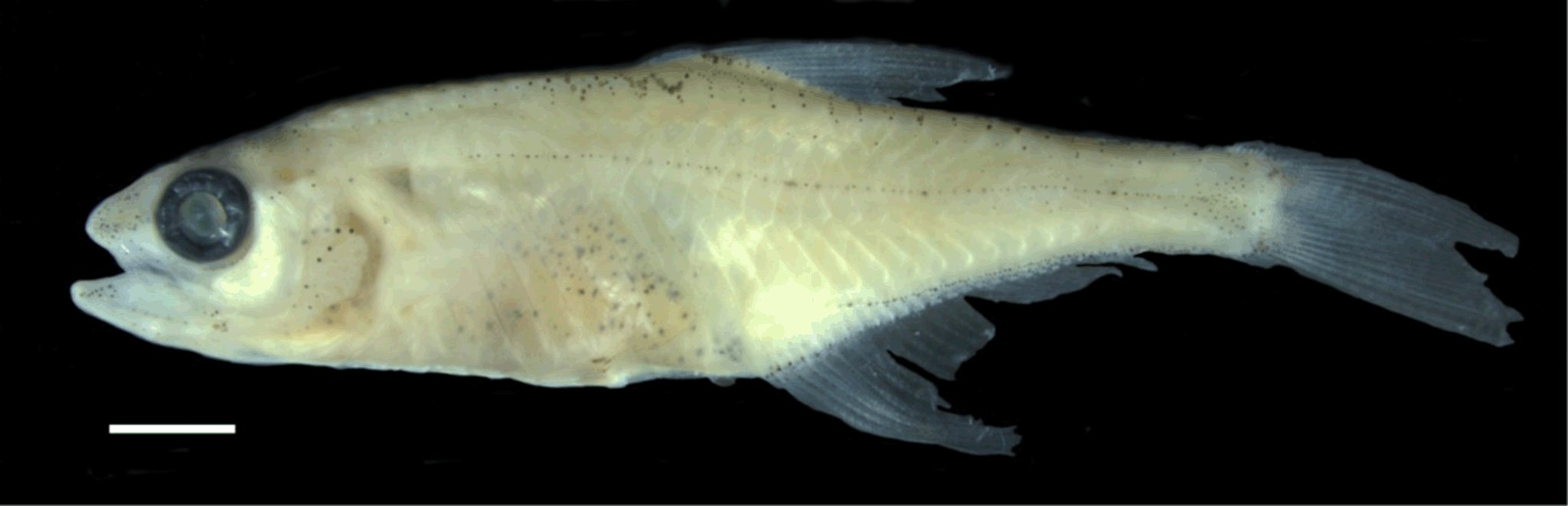

Scientific classification
- Kingdom: Animalia
- Phylum: Chordata
- Class: Actinopterygii
- Order: Characiformes
- Family: Acestrorhamphidae
- Genus: Priocharax
- Species: P. rex

Binomial name
- Priocharax rex Mattox, Acosta-Santos, Bogotá-Gregory, Agudelo, F. C. T. Lima, 2025

= Priocharax rex =

Species of ray-finned fish

Priocharax rex is a minute species of freshwater ray-finned fish belonging to the family Acestrorhamphidae, the American characins. This fish is considered to be found exclusively in the middle part of the Putumayo River basin in Colombia.

== Size ==
This species reaches a length of 2.07 cm (0.81 in).

== Etymology ==
The fish's name means "king" in Latin, referring to its size as the largest fish of the genus Priocharax.

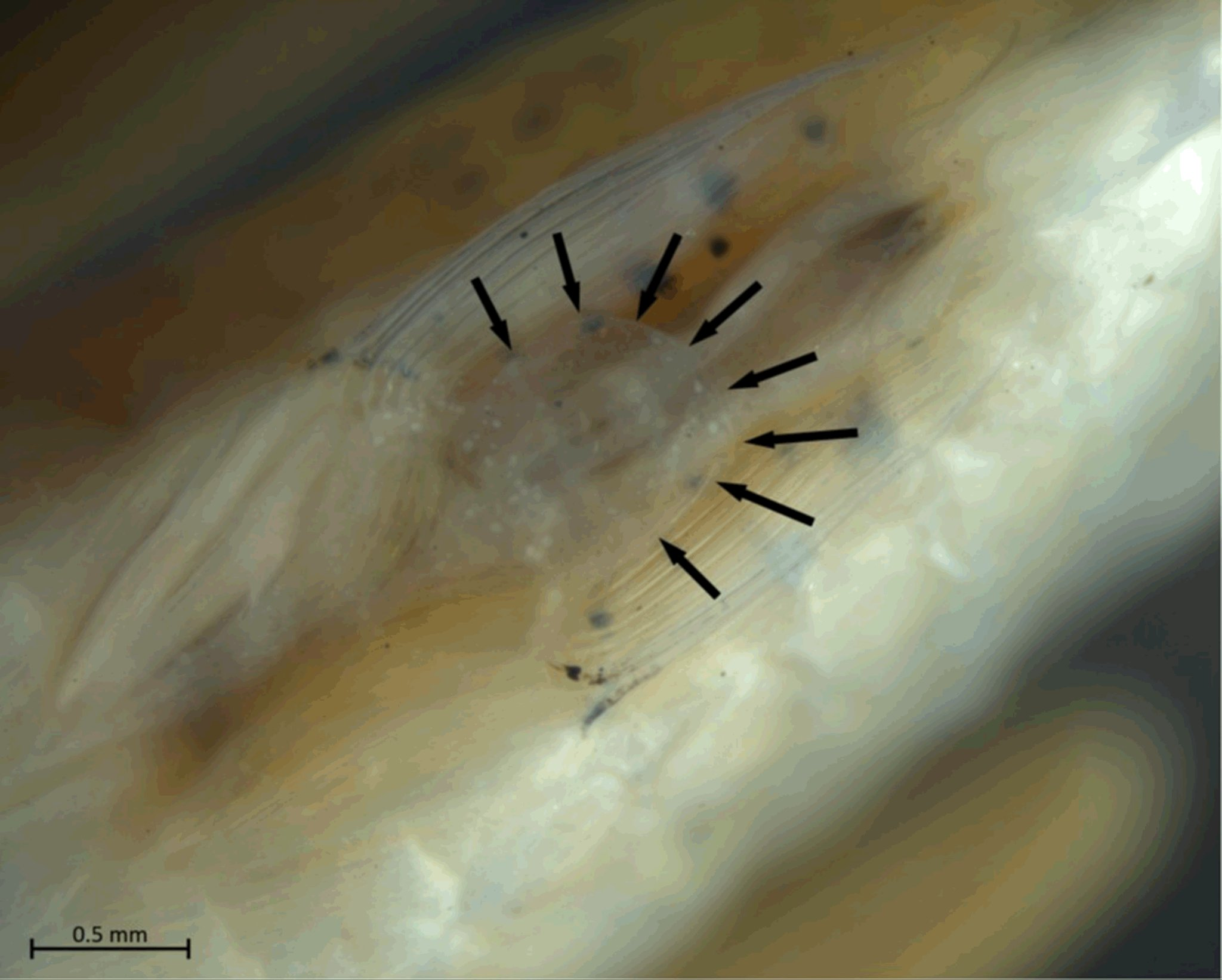
Skin flap

== Biology ==
Priocharax rex is distinguishable by a round flap of skin between contralateral pelvic fins.
