= Priocharax piagassu =

Scientific classification
- Kingdom: Animalia
- Phylum: Chordata
- Class: Actinopterygii
- Order: Characiformes
- Family: Acestrorhamphidae
- Genus: Priocharax
- Species: P. piagassu

Binomial name
- Priocharax piagassu Silva Lopez, Souza, Reia, Mantuaneli, Morales, F. C. T. Lima, de Oliveira & Mattox, 2025

Species of fish

Priocharax piagassu is a minute species of fish native to the Rio Purus and Solimões Draina, Brazil. The species, which has a skeleton of cartilage, is almost completely transparent.

== Size ==
This species reaches a length of 1.4 cm (0.55 in).

== Etymology ==
The fish's name comes from Nheengatu, an Indigenous language in Amazonas, Brazil, in which pid means "heart" and wa'su means "big," i.e., the "big heart", which is the region in the middle of the Amazon basin where the type specimens were collected.
