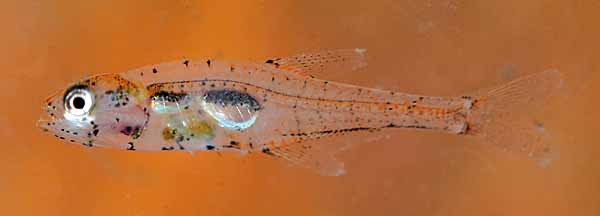
- Priocharax conwayi

Scientific classification
- Kingdom: Animalia
- Phylum: Chordata
- Class: Actinopterygii
- Order: Characiformes
- Family: Acestrorhamphidae
- Subfamily: Tyttobryconinae; Mattox & Melo, 2024

Type genus
- Tyttobrycon Géry, 1973

Genera
- See text

= Tyttobryconinae =

Subfamily of fishes

Tyttobryconinae is a subfamily of freshwater ray-finned fishes belonging to the family Acestrorhamphidae, the American characins. The fishes in this subfamily are found in South America.

== Genera ==
Tyttobryconinae contains the following genera:

- Priocharax Weitzman & Vari, 1987
- Tucanoichthys Géry & Römer, 1997
- Tyttobrycon Géry, 1973
