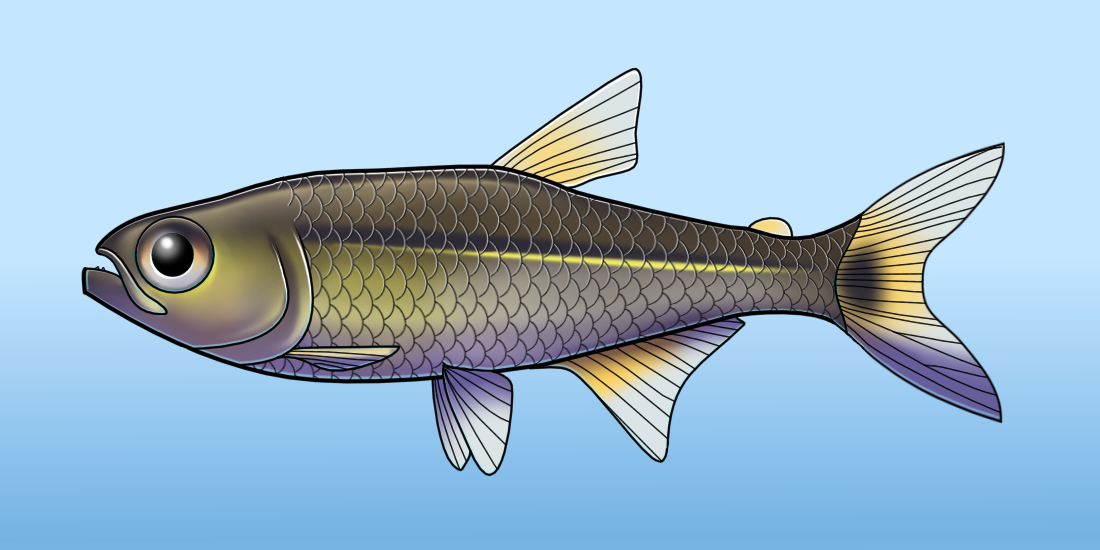
- Parapristella aubynei

Scientific classification
- Kingdom: Animalia
- Phylum: Chordata
- Class: Actinopterygii
- Order: Characiformes
- Family: Acestrorhamphidae
- Subfamily: Thayeriinae
- Genus: Parapristella; Géry, 1964

Type species
- Pristella aubynei C. H. Eigenmann, 1909

= Parapristella =

Genus of fishes

Parapristella is a genus of freshwater ray-finned fishes belonging to the family Acestrorhamphidae, the American characins. The fishes in this genus are found in northern South America.

== Species ==
Parapristella contains the following valid species:

- Parapristella aubynei (C. H. Eigenmann, 1909)
- Parapristella georgiae Géry, 1964
