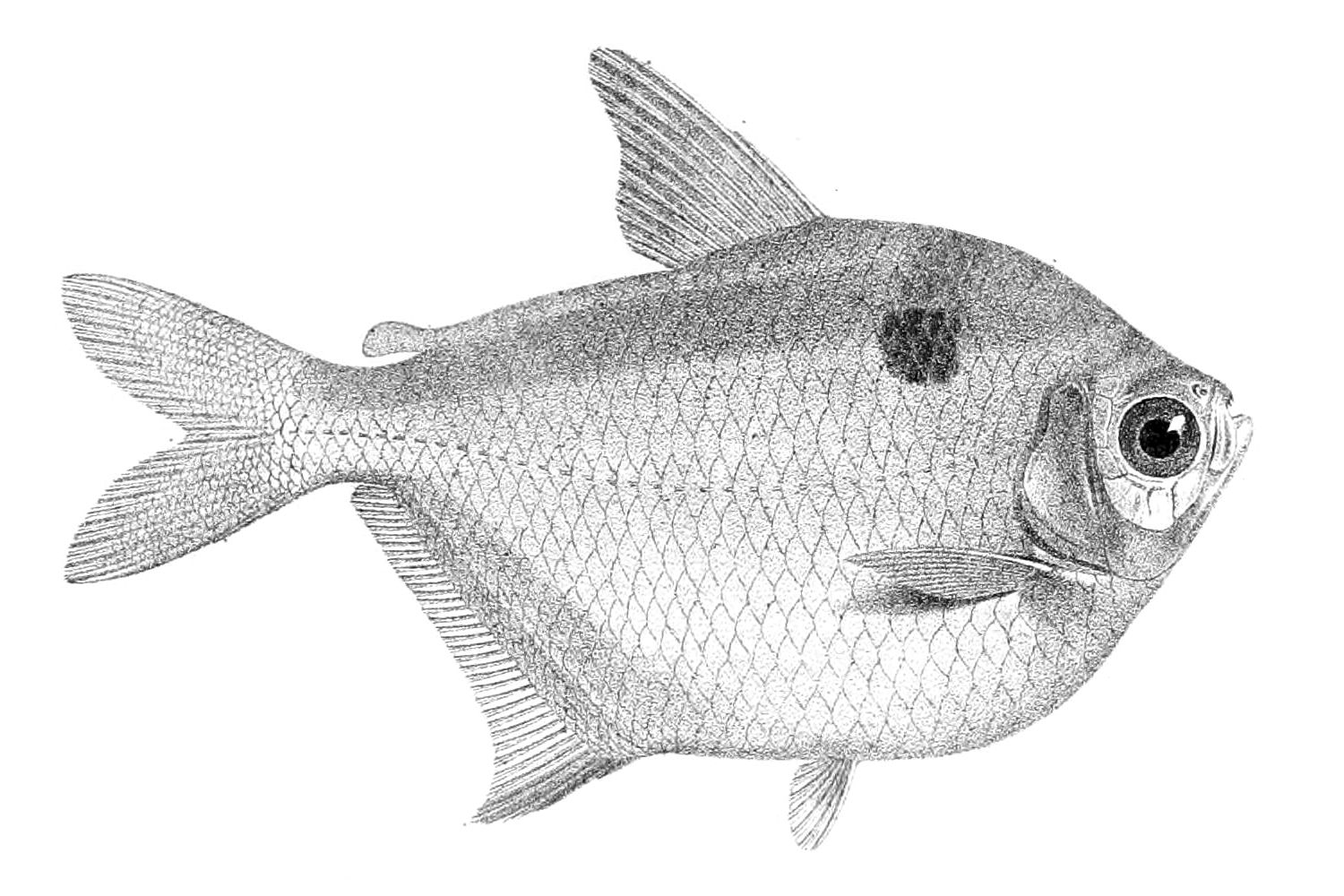
- Illustration from 1876

Conservation status
- Least Concern (IUCN 3.1)

Scientific classification
- Kingdom: Animalia
- Phylum: Chordata
- Class: Actinopterygii
- Order: Characiformes
- Family: Acestrorhamphidae
- Subfamily: Stichonodontinae
- Genus: Stichonodon; C. H. Eigenmann, 1903
- Species: S. insignis

Binomial name
- Stichonodon insignis (Steindachner, 1876)

Synonyms
- Luetkenia insignis Steindachner, 1876

= Stichonodon =

Species of fish

Stichonodon is a monospecific genus of freshwater ray-finned fish belonging to the family Acestrorhamphidae, the American characins. The only species in the genus is Stichonodon insignis, a fish which is endemic to the Amazon basin in Brazil. This species has a maximum total length of 8.0 cm (3.1 in).

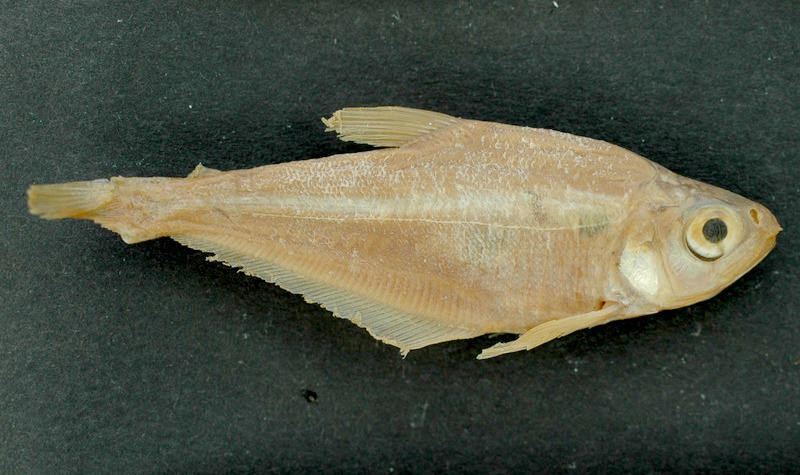
Wet specimen of a juvenile, showing the more slender form
