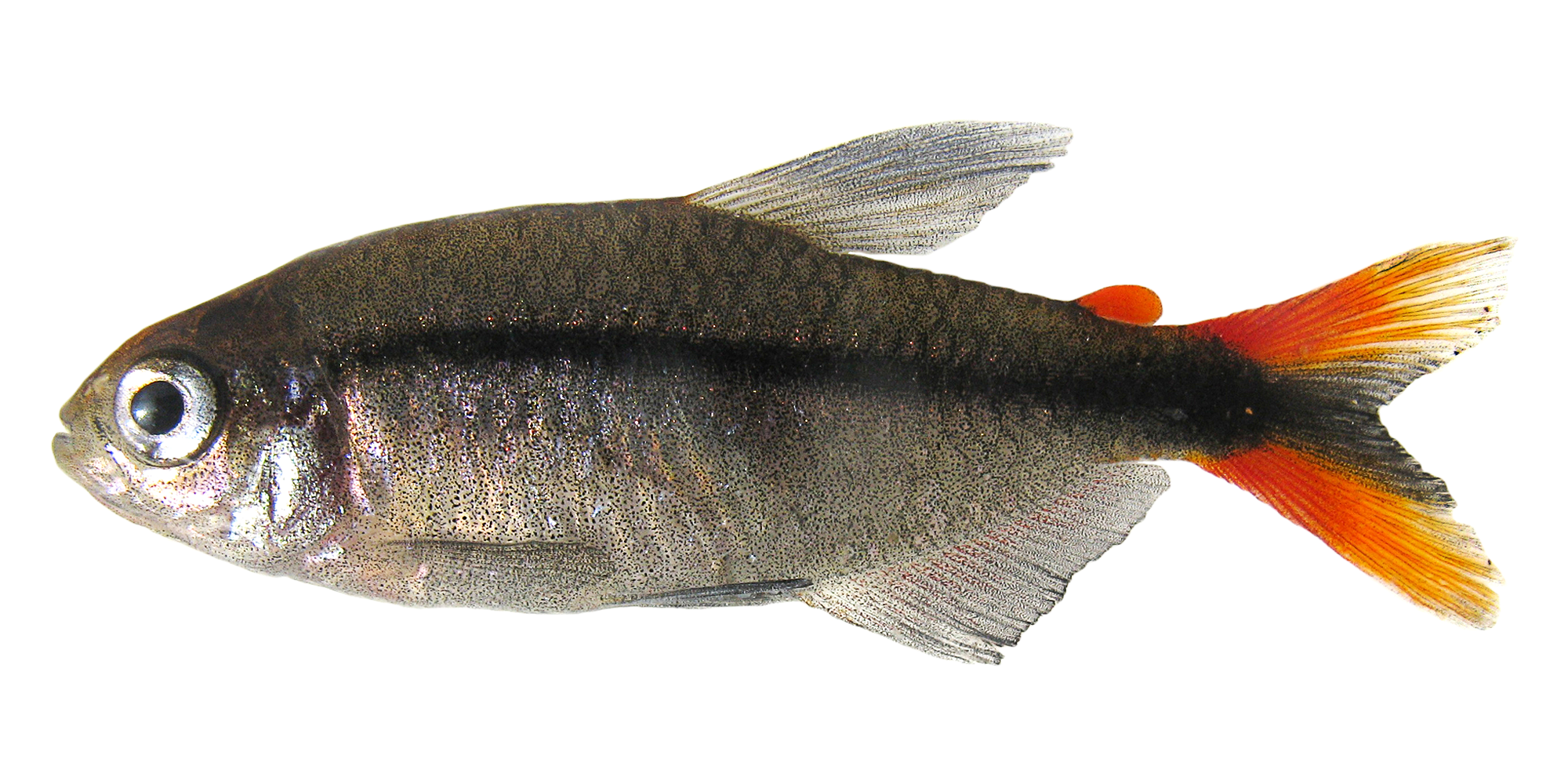

Scientific classification
- Kingdom: Animalia
- Phylum: Chordata
- Class: Actinopterygii
- Order: Characiformes
- Family: Acestrorhamphidae
- Subfamily: Hyphessobryconinae
- Genus: Erythrocharax; Netto-Ferreira, Birindelli, Sousa, Mariguela & C. de Oliveira, 2013
- Species: E. altipinnis

Binomial name
- Erythrocharax altipinnis Netto-Ferreira, Birindelli, Sousa, Mariguela & C. de Oliveira, 2013

= Erythrocharax =

Species of fish

Erythrocharax is a monospecific genus of freshwater ray-finned fish belonging to the family Acestrorhamphidae, the American characins. The only species in the genus is Erythrocharax altipinnis, a characin known only from Pará, Brazil, where it has been found in a small river. This species grows to 2.62 cm (1.03 in) in standard length.

== Etymology ==
The generic epithet is derived from the Greek erythrus (red) plus charax (a typical suffix for members of this family) in reference to the color of the caudal fin and the adipose fin of live specimens. The specific epithet is derived from the Latin alti (long) and pinnis (fin), a reference to the males' long dorsal fin rays.
