= Grundulinae =

Scientific classification
- Kingdom: Animalia
- Phylum: Chordata
- Class: Actinopterygii
- Order: Characiformes
- Family: Acestrorhamphidae
- Subfamily: Grundulinae; Fowler, 1958

Type genus
- Grundulus Valenciennes, 1846

Genera
- See text

Subfamily of fishes

Grundulinae is a subfamily of freshwater ray-finned fishes belonging to the family Acestrorhamphidae, the American tetras. The fishes in this subfamily are found in western South America.

== Genera ==
Grundulinae contains the following genera:

- Astyanacinus C. H. Eigenmann 1907
- Grundulus Valenciennes, 1846
