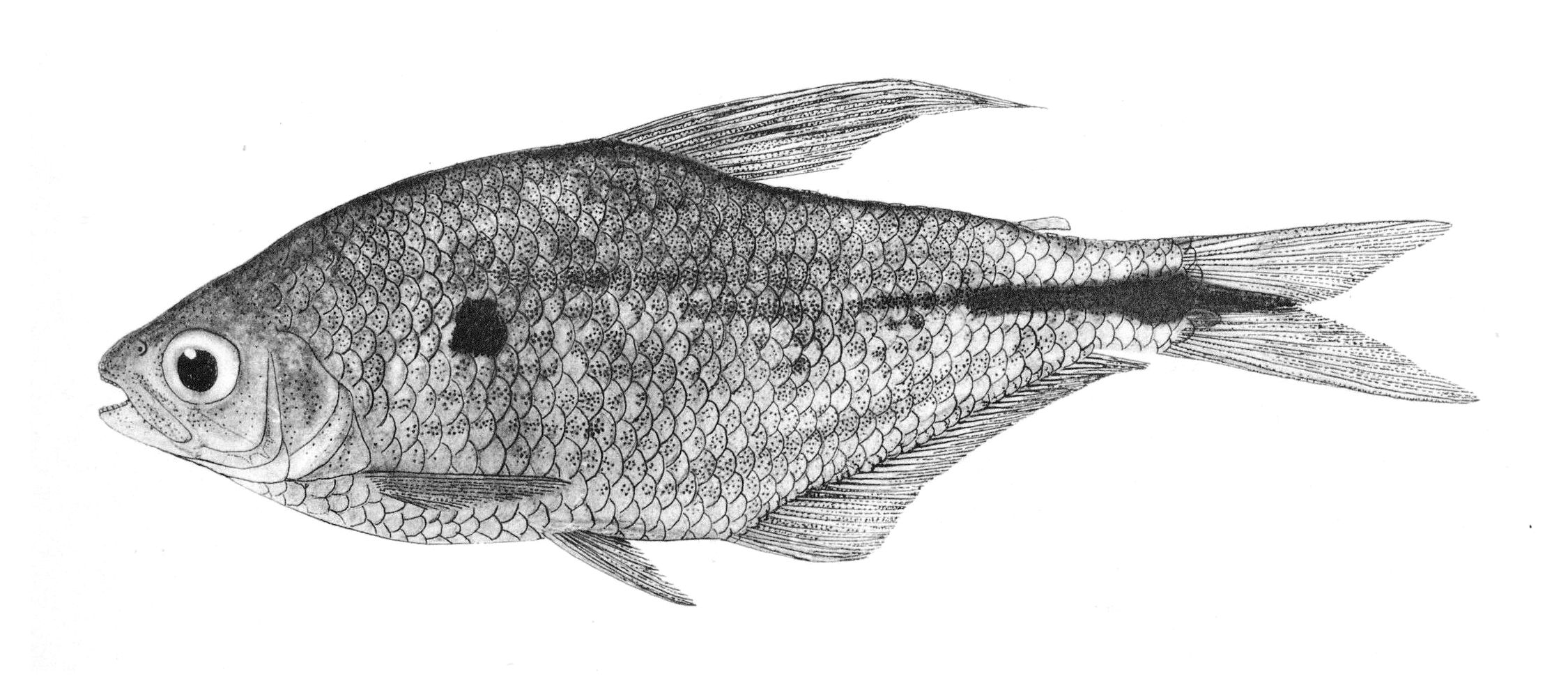
- 1917 Illustration

Conservation status
- Vulnerable (IUCN 3.1)

Scientific classification
- Kingdom: Animalia
- Phylum: Chordata
- Class: Actinopterygii
- Order: Characiformes
- Family: Acestrorhamphidae
- Subfamily: Rhoadsiinae
- Genus: Carlana; Strand, 1928
- Species: C. eigenmanni

Binomial name
- Carlana eigenmanni (Meek, 1912)

Synonyms
- Cheirodon eigenmanni Meek, 1912

= Carlana =

Genus of fishes

Carlana is a monospecific genus of freshwater ray-finned fishes belonging to the family Acestrorhamphidae, the American characins. The only species in this genus is Carlana eigenmanni, also known as the Carlana tetra, which is found in Costa Rica, Nicaragua and, maybe, Panama. The maximum standard length is 5.4 centimetres (2.1 in).

C. eigenmanni is found in freshwater environments in Central America in the Pacific and Atlantic drainages from Nicaragua to Panama. This species specifically lives close to the shoreline, river backwaters, and motionless region of habitats. They can be found near vegetation. They feed mainly on algae and sometimes on aquatic insects.

The fish is named in honor of ichthyologist Carl H. Eigenmann, who increased the knowledge of the characins.
