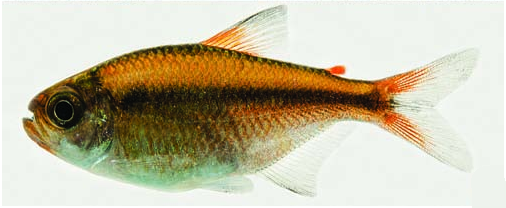
- Moenkhausia rubra

Scientific classification
- Kingdom: Animalia
- Phylum: Chordata
- Class: Actinopterygii
- Order: Characiformes
- Family: Acestrorhamphidae
- Subfamily: Stichonodontinae; C. H. Eigenmann, 1910

Type genus
- Stichonodon C. H. Eigenmann, 1903

Genera
- See text

= Stichonodontinae =

Subfamily of fishes

Stichonodontinae is a subfamily of freshwater ray-finned fishes belonging to the family Acestrorhamphidae, the American tetras. The fishes in this subfamily are found in South America.

== Genera ==
Stichonodontinae contains the following genera:

- Hasemania Ellis, 1911
- Moenkhausia C.H. Eigenmann, 1903
- Nematocharax Weitzman, Menezes & Britski, 1986
- Stichonodon C. H. Eigenmann, 1903
