= Tyttobrycon =

Scientific classification
- Kingdom: Animalia
- Phylum: Chordata
- Class: Actinopterygii
- Order: Characiformes
- Family: Acestrorhamphidae
- Subfamily: Tyttobryconinae
- Genus: Tyttobrycon; Géry, 1973

Type species
- Tyttobrycon xeruini Géry, 1973

Genus of fishes

Tyttobrycon is a genus of freshwater ray-finned fish belonging to the family Acestrorhamphidae, the American characins. The fishes in this genus are found in the Amazon Basin in South America.

== Species ==
There are currently six recognized species:

- Tyttobrycon dorsimaculatus Géry, 1973
- Tyttobrycon hamatus Géry, 1973
- Tyttobrycon marajoara Marinho, Bastos & Menezes, 2013
- Tyttobrycon shibattai Abrahão, Pastana & Marinho, 2019
- Tyttobrycon spinosus Géry, 1973
- Tyttobrycon xeruini Géry, 1973
