= Trochilocharax =

Conservation status
- Data Deficient (IUCN 3.1)

Scientific classification
- Kingdom: Animalia
- Phylum: Chordata
- Class: Actinopterygii
- Order: Characiformes
- Family: Acestrorhamphidae
- Subfamily: Trochilocharacinae; Melo, Mattox & Oliveira, 2024
- Genus: Trochilocharax; Zarske, 2010
- Species: T. ornatus

Binomial name
- Trochilocharax ornatus Zarske, 2010

Species of fish

Trochilocharax is a monospecific genus of freshwater ray-finned fish belonging to the family Acestrorhamphidae. The only species in the genus is Trochilocharax ornatus, the hummingbird tetra, and this genus is the only genus in the monotypic subfamily Trochilocharacinae. This species is known only from Peru, the holotypes being imported to Germany from Peru, near Iquitos. This species has a maximum standard length of 1.7 cm (0.67 in).
