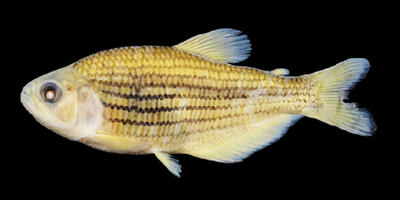
- Hollandichthys multifasciatus
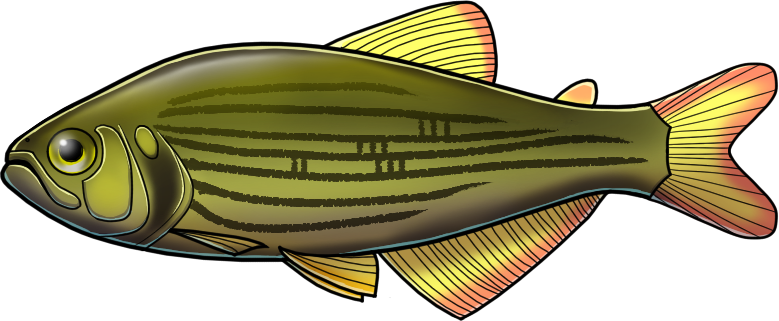
- Hollandichthys taramandahy

Scientific classification
- Kingdom: Animalia
- Phylum: Chordata
- Class: Actinopterygii
- Order: Characiformes
- Family: Acestrorhamphidae
- Subfamily: Thayeriinae
- Genus: Hollandichthys; C. H. Eigenmann, 1910

Type species
- Tetragonopterus multifasciatus C. H. Eigenmann & A. A. Norris, 1900

= Hollandichthys =

Genus of fishes

Hollandichthys is a genus of freshwater ray-finned fish belonging to the family Acestrorhamphidae, the American characins. The fishes in this genus are endemic to rivers and streams in southern and southeastern Brazil from Rio Grande do Sul to Rio de Janeiro. These are small fish that reach up to 9.6 cm (3.8 in) in standard length.

== Species ==
Hollandichthys contains the following valid species:

- Hollandichthys multifasciatus (C. H. Eigenmann & A. A. Norris, 1900)
- Hollandichthys taramandahy Bertaco & L. R. Malabarba, 2013

The genus is named for zoologist and paleontologist William J. Holland (1848-1932), Director of the Carnegie Museums of Pittsburgh.
