= Oxybrycon =

Conservation status
- Least Concern (IUCN 3.1)

Scientific classification
- Kingdom: Animalia
- Phylum: Chordata
- Class: Actinopterygii
- Order: Characiformes
- Family: Acestrorhamphidae
- Subfamily: Oxybryconinae; Melo, Mattox & Oliveira, 2024
- Genus: Oxybrycon; Géry, 1964
- Species: O. parvulus

Binomial name
- Oxybrycon parvulus Géry, 1964

Monotypic genus of fishes

Oxybrycon is a monospecific genus of freshwater ray-finned fish belonging to the family Acestrorhamphidae, the American tetras. It is the only genus in the monotypic subfamily Oxybryconinae and the only species in the genus is Oxybrycon parvulus. This species is known only from the upper Amazon basin in Peru and the middle Madeira River in Brazil. O. parvulus has a maximum standard length of 2.1 cm (0.83 in).
