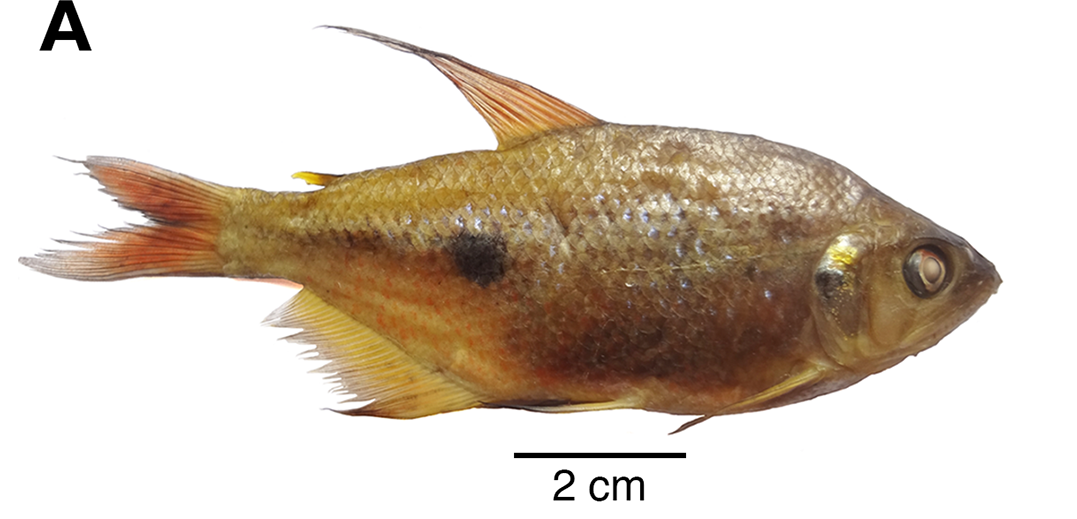
- Rhoadsia altipinna

Scientific classification
- Kingdom: Animalia
- Phylum: Chordata
- Class: Actinopterygii
- Order: Characiformes
- Family: Acestrorhamphidae
- Subfamily: Rhoadsiinae
- Genus: Rhoadsia; Fowler, 1911

Type species
- Rhoadsia altipinna Fowler, 1911

= Rhoadsia =

Genus of fishes

Rhoadsia is a genus of freshwater ray-finned fishes belonging to the family Acestrorhamphidae, the American characins. The fishes in this genus are endemic to river basins in western Ecuador and Peru. The name of this genus honours Samuel Nicholson Rhoads, the owner of the Franklin Book Shop at 920 Walnut St., Philadelphia and a naturalist in Philadelphia who collected the holotype of the type species of the genus, R. altipinna.

== Species ==
Rhoadsia contains the following valid species:

- Rhoadsia altipinna Fowler, 1911
- Rhoadsia minor C. H. Eigenmann & Henn, 1914
