= Rachoviscus =

Scientific classification
- Kingdom: Animalia
- Phylum: Chordata
- Class: Actinopterygii
- Order: Characiformes
- Family: Acestrorhamphidae
- Subfamily: Thayeriinae
- Genus: Rachoviscus; Myers, 1926

Type species
- Rachoviscus crassiceps Myers, 1926

Genus of fishes

Rachoviscus is a genus of freshwater ray-finned fishes belonging to the family Acestrorhamphidae, the American characins. These threatened fish are endemic to coastal river basins in Bahia, Paraná and Santa Catarina in eastern Brazil.

== Species ==
Rachoviscus contains the following valid species:

- Rachoviscus crassiceps G. S. Myers, 1926
- Rachoviscus graciliceps S. H. Weitzman & da Cruz, 1981
