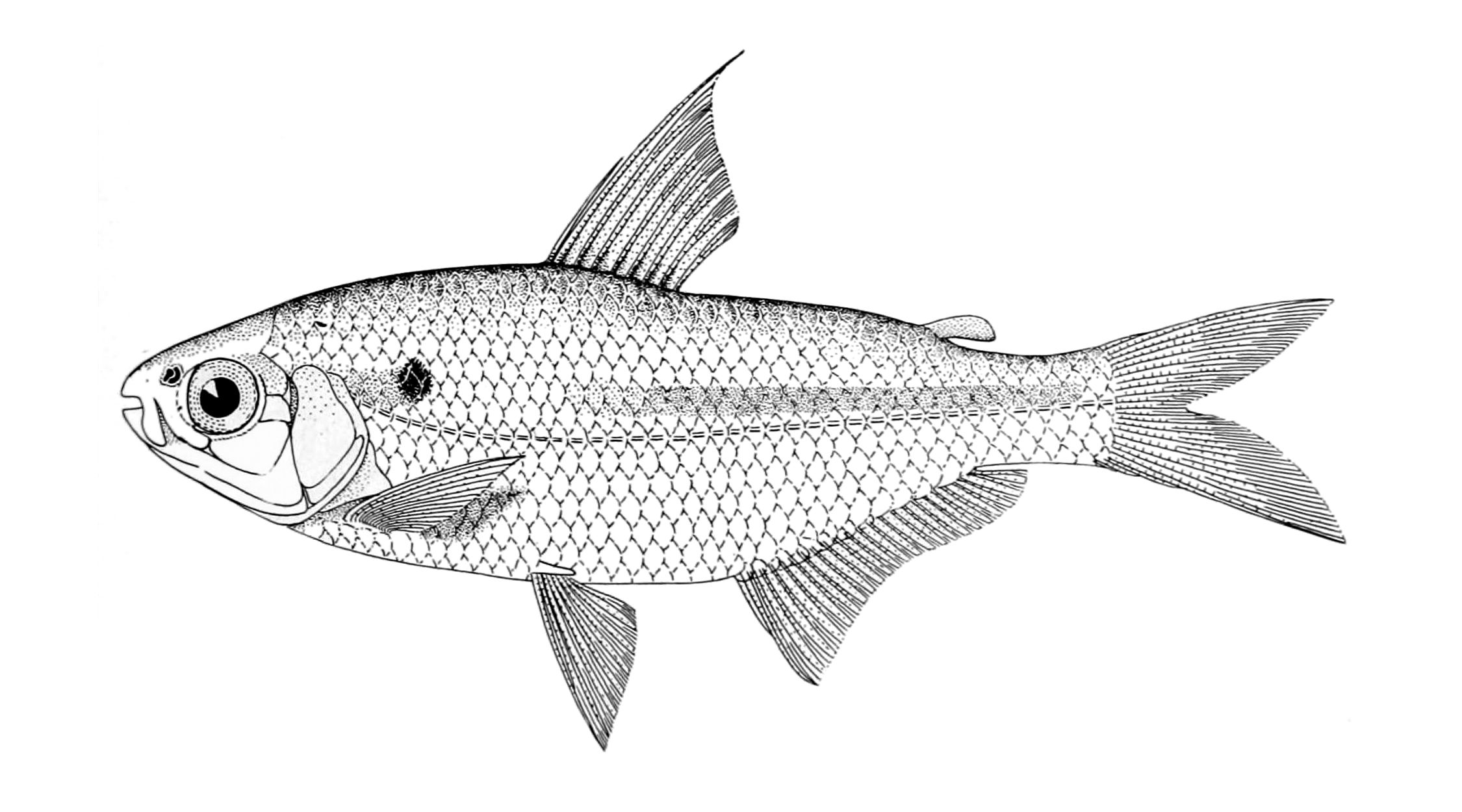
- An illustration of Parecbasis cyclolepis

Conservation status
- Least Concern (IUCN 3.1)

Scientific classification
- Kingdom: Animalia
- Phylum: Chordata
- Class: Actinopterygii
- Order: Characiformes
- Family: Acestrorhamphidae
- Subfamily: Hyphessobryconinae
- Genus: Parecbasis; C. H. Eigenmann, 1914
- Species: P. cyclolepis

Binomial name
- Parecbasis cyclolepis C. H. Eigenmann, 1914

= Parecbasis =

Genus of fishes

Parecbasis is a monospecific genus of freshwater ray-finned fish belonging to the family Acestrorhamphidae, the American characins. It contains the single species Parecbasis cyclolepis, found in the Western Amazon Basin in Bolivia, Brazil, Colombia and Peru.
