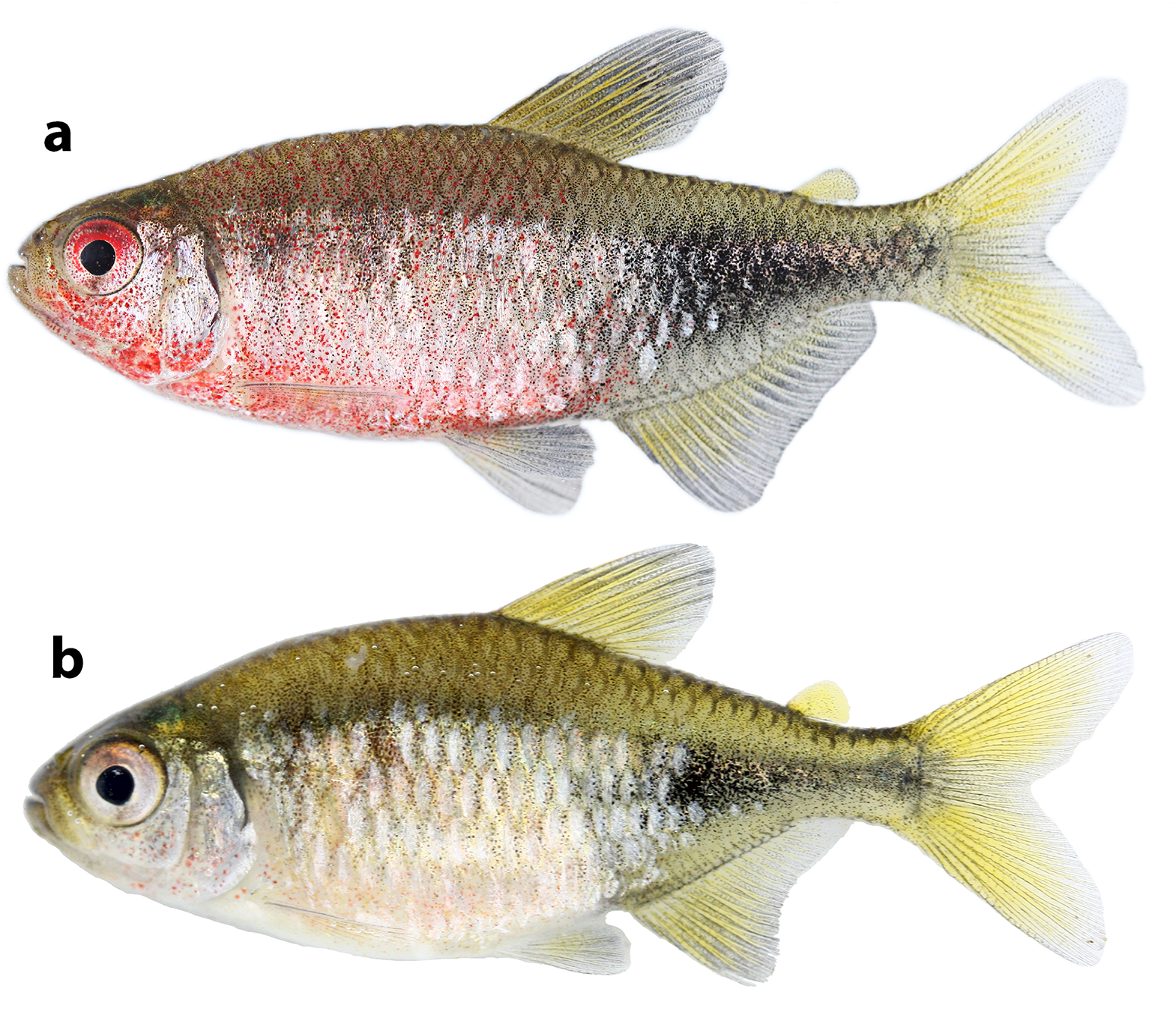

Scientific classification
- Kingdom: Animalia
- Phylum: Chordata
- Class: Actinopterygii
- Order: Characiformes
- Family: Acestrorhamphidae
- Subfamily: Hyphessobryconinae
- Genus: Phycocharax; Ohara, Mirande & F. C. T. Lima, 2017
- Species: P. rasbora

Binomial name
- Phycocharax rasbora Ohara, Mirande & F. C. T. Lima, 2017

= Phycocharax =

Species of fish

Phycocharax is a monospecific genus of freshwater ray-finned fish belonging to the family Acestrorhamphidae, the American characins. The only species in the genus is Phycocharax rasbora. This fish is endemic to the Brazilian Amazon, where it is only known from the upper Braço Norte River (Serra do Cachimbo region), a blackwater tributary in the Teles Pires basin, itself a part of the Tapajós basin. A dam has been built on the Braço Norte River and while the species is uncommon downstream, it is very abundant in the reservoir above.

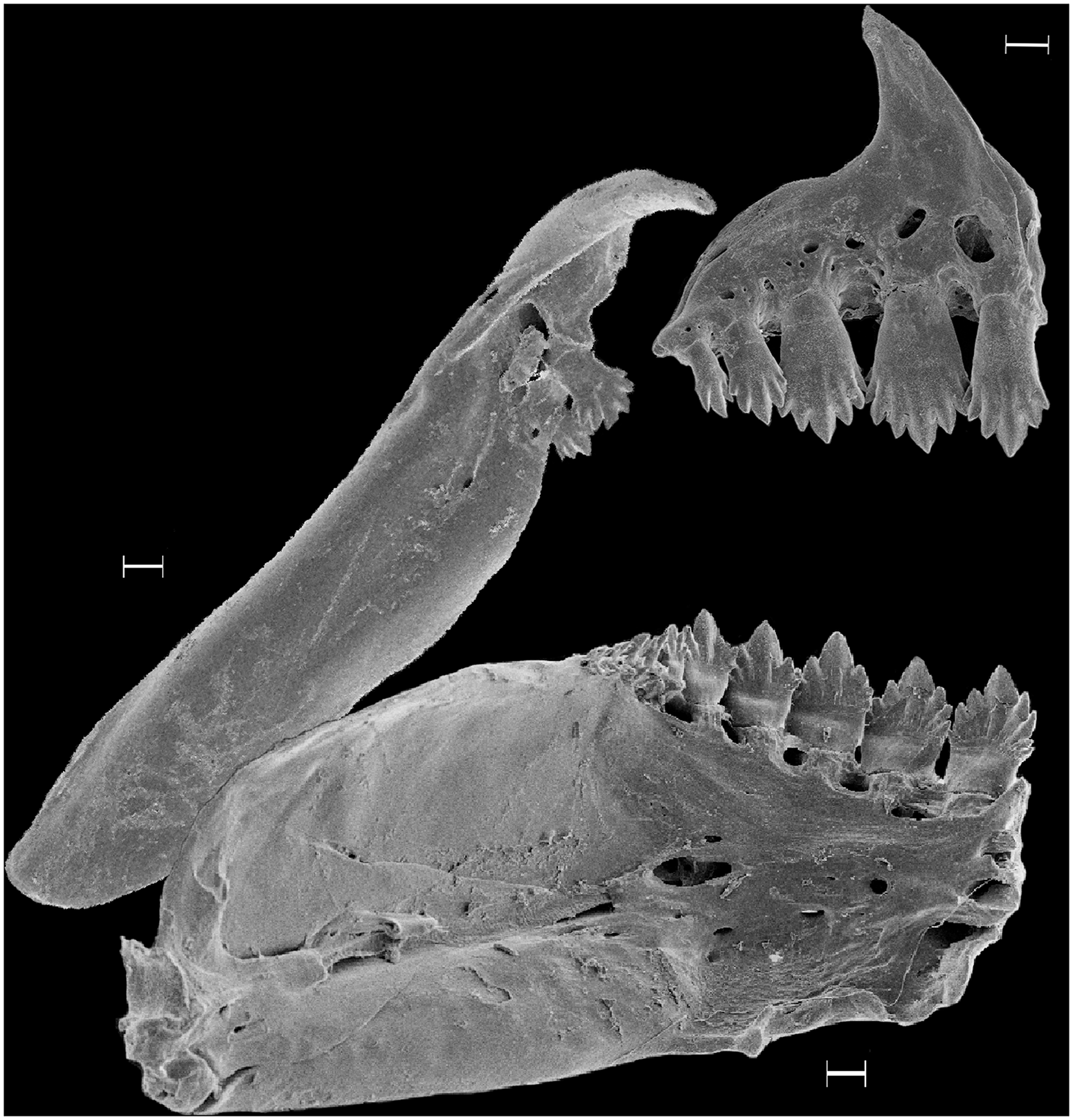
Jaws

Its species name refers to the similarity in color and pattern to Trigonostigma rasboras, an unrelated but well-known Asian fish. The mainly reddish males reach up to about 3.4 cm (1.3 in) in standard length, while the duller yellowish females reach up to about 3.1 cm (1.2 in).
