= Dinotopterygium =

Scientific classification
- Kingdom: Animalia
- Phylum: Chordata
- Class: Actinopterygii
- Order: Characiformes
- Family: Acestrorhamphidae
- Subfamily: Hyphessobryconinae
- Genus: Dinotopterygium; Frainer, Carvalho, Bertaco & Malabarba, 2021

Type species
- Dinotopterygium uniodon Frainer, Carvalho, Bertaco & Malabarba, 2021

Species
- See text

Genus of fishes

Dinotopterygium is a genus of freshwater ray-finned fish belonging to the family Acestrorhamphidae, the American characins. The fishes in this genus were described in 2021 from specimens held in museums. The type localities of both species were in Goias in the Rio Paranã drainage.

== Species ==
Dinotopterygium contains the following valid species:

- Dinotopterygium diodon Frainer, Carvalho, Bertaco & Malabarba, 2021
- Dinotopterygium uniodon Frainer, Carvalho, Bertaco & Malabarba, 2021
