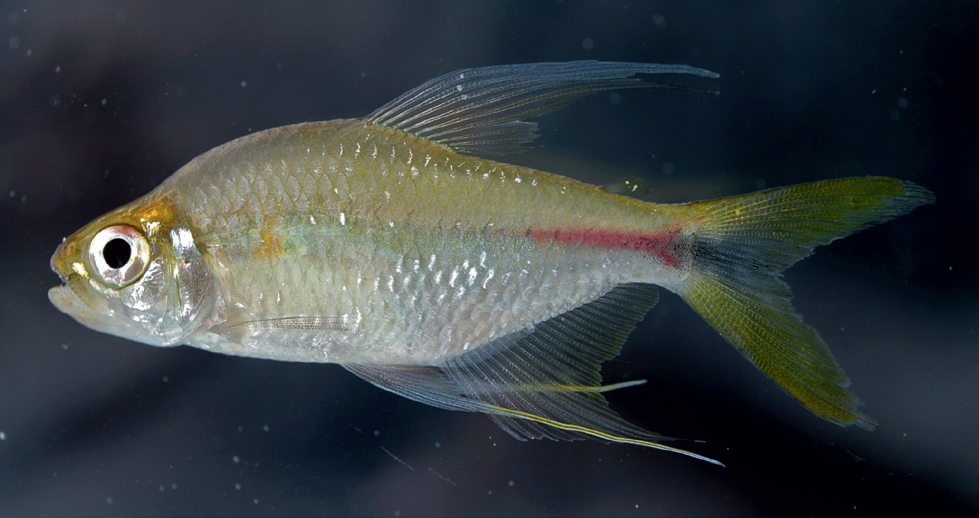
- Nematocharax venustus

Scientific classification
- Kingdom: Animalia
- Phylum: Chordata
- Class: Actinopterygii
- Order: Characiformes
- Family: Acestrorhamphidae
- Subfamily: Stichonodontinae
- Genus: Nematocharax; S. H. Weitzman, Menezes & Britski, 1986

Type species
- Nematocharax venustus Weitzman, Menezes & Britski, 1986

= Nematocharax =

Genus of fishes

Nematocharax is a genus of freshwater ray-finned fishes belonging to the family Acestrorhamphidae, the American characins. The species are endemic to Brazil. The generic name alludes to νήματος (nḗmatos), "threaded", referring to the long, thread-like fins; and Charax, a common name for genera in the order Characiformes, from χάραξ (chárax), meaning a pointed stake in a palisade, referring to their dentition.

== Species ==
Namatocharax contains the following valid species:

- Nematocharax varii Barreto, Silva, Batalha‐Filho, Affonso & Zanata, 2018
- Nematocharax venustus S. H. Weitzman, Menezes & Britski, 1986
