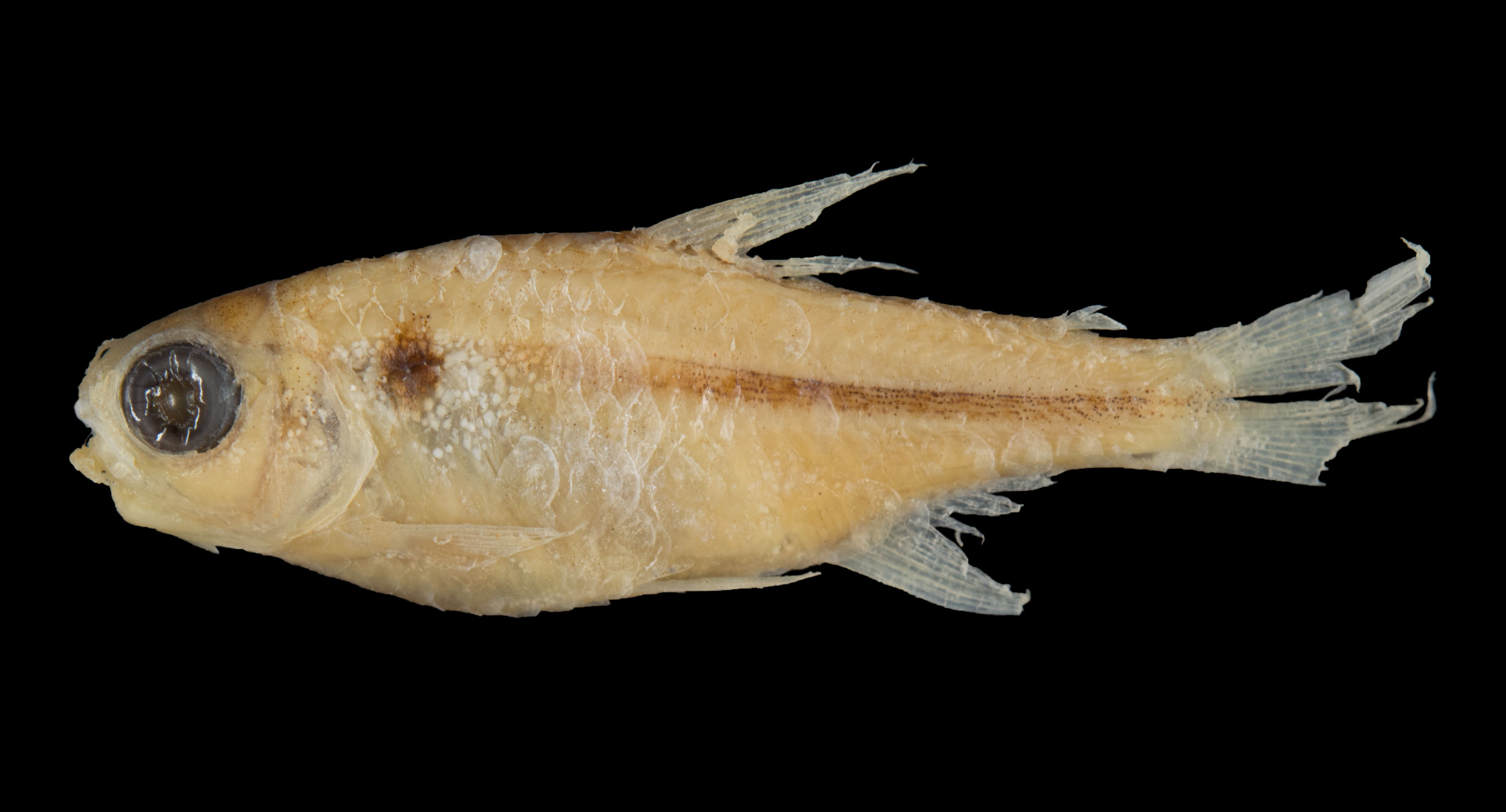
- Bryconella pallidifrons

Conservation status
- Least Concern (IUCN 3.1)

Scientific classification
- Kingdom: Animalia
- Phylum: Chordata
- Class: Actinopterygii
- Order: Characiformes
- Family: Acestrorhamphidae
- Subfamily: Thayeriinae
- Genus: Bryconella; Géry, 1965
- Species: B. pallidifrons

Binomial name
- Bryconella pallidifrons (Fowler, 1946)

Synonyms
- Cheirodon pallidifrons Fowler, 1946; Hyphessobrycon thompsoni Fowler, 1949; Bryconella haraldi Géry, 1965

= Bryconella =

Species of fish

Bryconella is a monospecific genus of freshwater ray-finned fish belonging to the family Acestrorhamphidae, the American characins. The only species in the genus is Bryconella pallidifrons, which is found in the Amazon River basin of Brazil and Peru.

B. pallidifrons is found in a freshwater environment at a pelagic depth range. This species is native to a tropical climate. It reaches a maximum length of about 2.3 cm or 0.91 in for males or about 3.5 cm or 1.4 in for females. B. pallidifrons swims in small schools.
