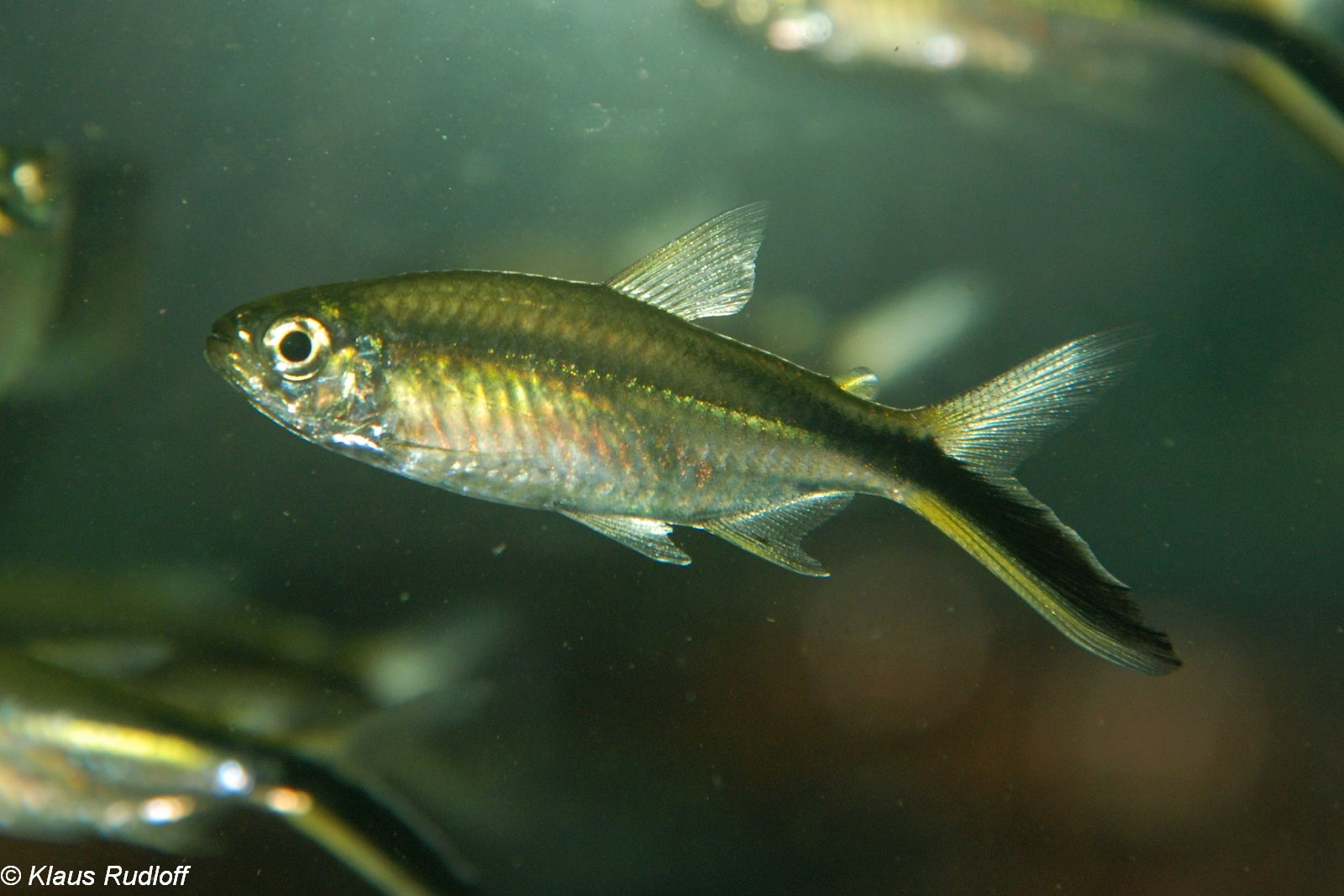
- Thayeria obliqua, the type species of the genus Thayeria.

Scientific classification
- Kingdom: Animalia
- Phylum: Chordata
- Class: Actinopterygii
- Order: Characiformes
- Family: Acestrorhamphidae
- Subfamily: Thayeriinae; Ota, Reia & Benine, 2024

Type genus
- Thayeria C. H. Eigenmann, 1908

Genera
- See text

= Thayeriinae =

Subfamily of fishes

Thayeriinae is a subfamily of freshwater ray-finned fishes belonging to the family Acestrorhamphidae, the American tetras. The fishes in this subfamily are found in South America.

== Genera ==
Thayeriinae contains the following genera:

- Bario Myers, 1940
- Bryconella Géry, 1965
- Hollandichthys C. H. Eigenmann, 1909
- Holopristis C. H. Eigenmann, 1903
- Inpaichthys Géry & Junk, 1977
- Parapristella Géry, 1964
- Rachoviscus Myers, 1926
- Ramirezella Fernández-Yépez, 1949
- Thayeria C. H. Eigenmann, 1908
