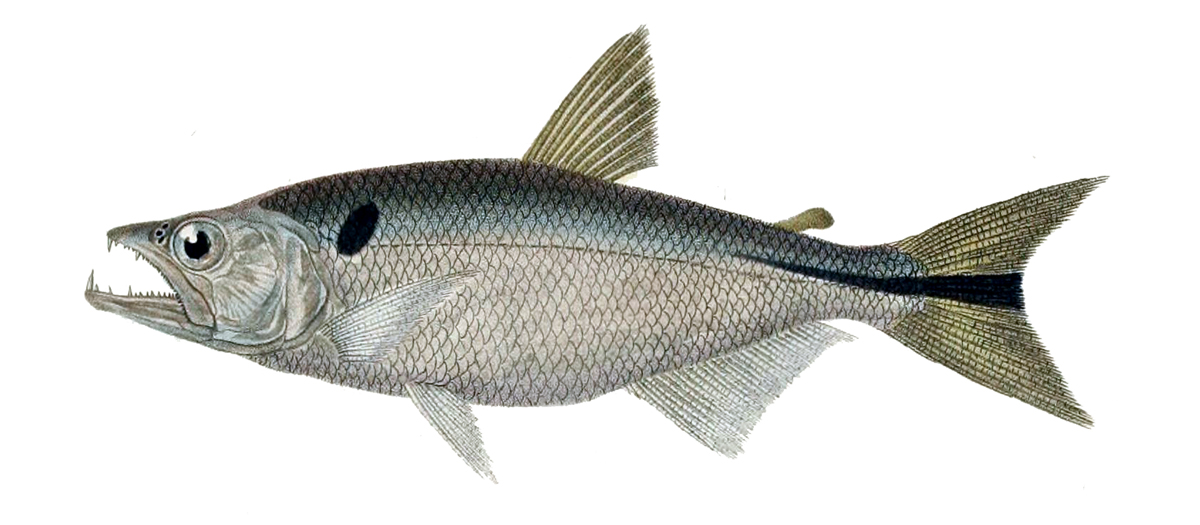
- Oligosarcus hepsetus, which, as Hydrocyon hepsetus, is the type species of the genus Acestrorhamphus.

Scientific classification
- Kingdom: Animalia
- Phylum: Chordata
- Class: Actinopterygii
- Order: Characiformes
- Family: Acestrorhamphidae
- Subfamily: Acestrorhamphinae; C. H. Eigenmann, 1907

Type genus
- Acestrorhamphus C. H. Eigenmann & C. H. Kennedy, 1903

Genera
- See text

= Acestrorhamphinae =

Subfamily of fishes

Acestrorhamphinae is a subfamily of freshwater ray-finned fishes belonging to the family Acestrorhamphidae, the American characins. The fishes in this subfamily are found in South America, Central America and southern North America.

== Genera ==
Acestrorhamphinae contains the following genera:

- Andromakhe Terán, Benitez & Mirande, 2020
- Astyanax Baird & Girard, 1854
- Ctenobrycon C. H. Eigenmann, 1908
- Oligosarcus Günther, 1864
- Psalidodon C. H. Eigenmann, 1911
