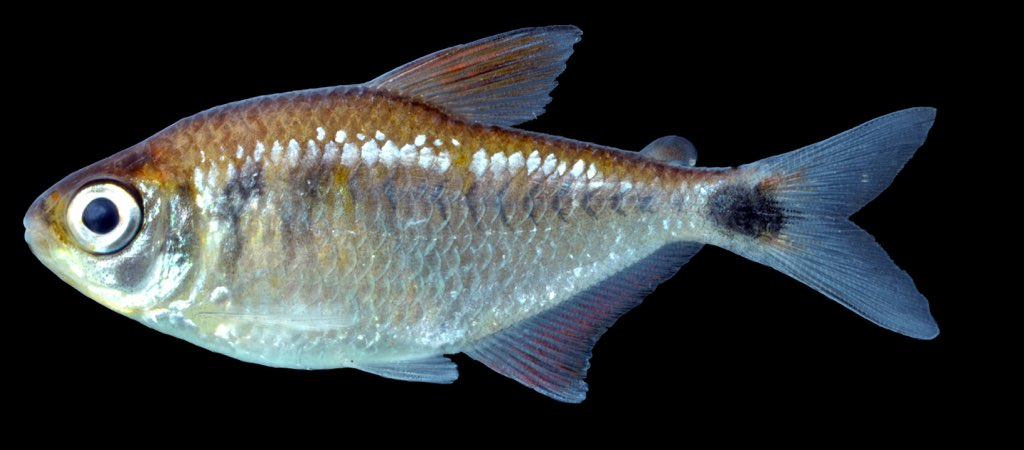
- Jupiaba pinnata

Scientific classification
- Kingdom: Animalia
- Phylum: Chordata
- Class: Actinopterygii
- Order: Characiformes
- Family: Acestrorhamphidae
- Subfamily: Jupiabinae; Benine & Ota, 2024
- Genus: Jupiaba; Zanata, 1997

Type species
- Jupiaba poranga Zanata, 1997

= Jupiaba =

Genus of fishes

Jupiaba is a genus of freshwater ray-finned fish belonging to the family Acestrorhamphidae, the American characins. The fishes in this genus are from South America. It is the only member of the subfamily Jupiabinae.

== Species ==
Jupiaba contains the following valid species:

- Jupiaba abramoides (C. H. Eigenmann, 1909)
- Jupiaba acanthogaster (C. H. Eigenmann, 1911)
- Jupiaba ajuricaba (Marinho & F. C. T. Lima, 2009)
- Jupiaba anterior (C, H. Eigenmann, 1908)
- Jupiaba anteroides (Géry, 1965)
- Jupiaba apenima Zanata, 1997
- Jupiaba asymmetrica (C. H. Eigenmann, 1908)
- Jupiaba atypindi Zanata, 1997
- Jupiaba citrina Zanata & Ohara, 2009
- Jupiaba elassonaktis T. N. A. Pereira & Lucinda, 2007
- Jupiaba essequibensis (C. H. Eigenmann, 1909)
- Jupiaba iasy Netto-Ferreira, Zanata, Birindelli & Sousa, 2009
- Jupiaba keithi (Géry, Planquette & Le Bail, 1996)
- Jupiaba kurua Birindelli, Zanata, Sousa & Netto-Ferreira, 2009
- Jupiaba maroniensis (Géry, Planquette & Le Bail, 1996)
- Jupiaba meunieri (Géry, Planquette & Le Bail, 1996)
- Jupiaba minor (Travassos, 1964)
- Jupiaba mucronata (C. H. Eigenmann, 1909)
- Jupiaba ocellata (Géry, Planquette & Le Bail, 1996)
- Jupiaba paranatinga Netto-Ferreira, Zanata, Birindelli & Sousa, 2009
- Jupiaba pinnata (C. H. Eigenmann, 1909)
- Jupiaba pirana Zanata, 1997
- Jupiaba poekotero Zanata & F. C. T. Lima, 2005
- Jupiaba polylepis (Günther, 1864)
- Jupiaba poranga Zanata, 1997
- Jupiaba potaroensis (C. H. Eigenmann, 1909)
- Jupiaba scologaster (M. J. Weitzman & Vari, 1986)
- Jupiaba yarina Zanata, 1997
- Jupiaba zonata (C. H. Eigenmann, 1908)
