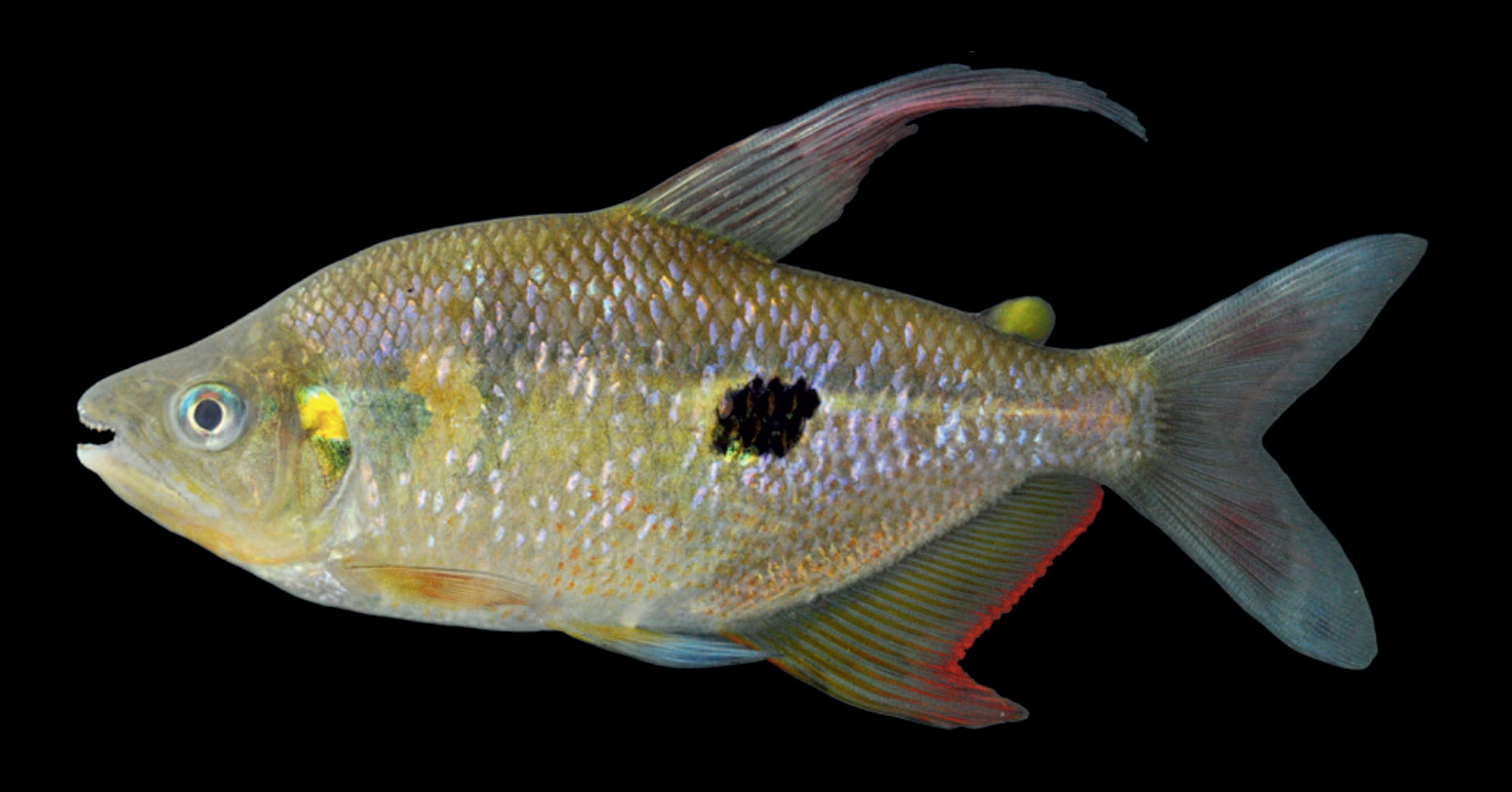
- Rhoadsia altipinna

Scientific classification
- Kingdom: Animalia
- Phylum: Chordata
- Class: Actinopterygii
- Order: Characiformes
- Family: Acestrorhamphidae
- Subfamily: Rhoadsiinae; Fowler, 1911

Type genus
- Rhoadsia Fowler, 1908

Genera
- See text

= Rhoadsiinae =

Subfamily of fishes

Rhoadsiinae, the Pacific tetras, is a subfamily of freshwater ray-finned fishes belonging to the family Acestrorhamphidae, the American tetras. The fishes in this subfamily are found in rivers draining into the Pacific Ocean in Central and South America.

The name of this subfamily is derived from that of its type genus, Rhoadsia. This name honours Samuel Nicholson Rhoads, the owner of the Franklin Book Shop at 920 Walnut St., Philadelphia and a naturalist in Philadelphia who collected the holotype of the type species of that genus, R. altipinna.

== Genera ==
Rhoadsiinae contains the following genera:

- Carlana Strand, 1928
- Nematobrycon C. H. Eigenmann, 1911
- Parastremma C. H. Eigenmann, 1912
- Pseudochalceus Kner, 1863
- Rhoadsia Fowler, 1911
