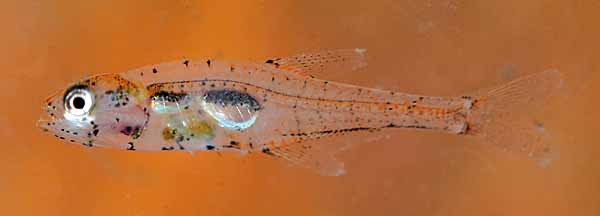
- Priocharax conwayi

Scientific classification
- Kingdom: Animalia
- Phylum: Chordata
- Class: Actinopterygii
- Division: Teleostei
- Order: Characiformes
- Family: Acestrorhamphidae
- Subfamily: Tyttobryconinae
- Genus: Priocharax; S. H. Weitzman & Vari, 1987

Type species
- Priocharax ariel S. H. Weitzman & Vari, 1987

Species
- See text

= Priocharax =

Genus of fishes

Priocharax is a genus of very small freshwater ray-finned fishes belonging to the family Acestrorhamphidae (American characins). The fishes in this genus are found in the Amazon and Orinoco basins in tropical South America.

== Species ==
There are currently 12 recognized species in this genus:

- Priocharax ariel S. H. Weitzman & Vari, 1987
- Priocharax britzi Mattox, Souza, Toledo-Piza & Oliveira, 2021
- Priocharax conwayi Mattox, F. C. T. Lima, Britz, Souza & Oliveira, 2024
- Priocharax marupiara Mattox, Britz, Souza, Casas, F. C. T. Lima & Oliveira, 2023
- Priocharax nanus Toledo-Piza, Mattox & Britz, 2014
- Priocharax phasma Mattox, F. C. T. Lima, Britz, Souza & Oliveira, 2024
- Priocharax piagassu Silva Lopez, Souza, Reia, Mantuaneli, Morales, F. C. T. Lima, Oliveira & Mattox, 2025
- Priocharax pygmaeus S. H. Weitzman & Vari, 1987
- Priocharax rex Mattox, Acosta-Santos, Bogotá-Gregory, Agudelo, F. C. T. Lima, 2025
- Priocharax robbiei Silva Lopez, Souza, Reia, Mantuaneli, Morales, F. C. T. Lima, Oliveira & Mattox, 2025
- Priocharax toledopizae Mattox, Britz, Souza, Casas, F. C. T. Lima & Oliveira, 2023
- Priocharax varii Mattox, Souza, Toledo-Piza, Britz & Oliveira, 2020
