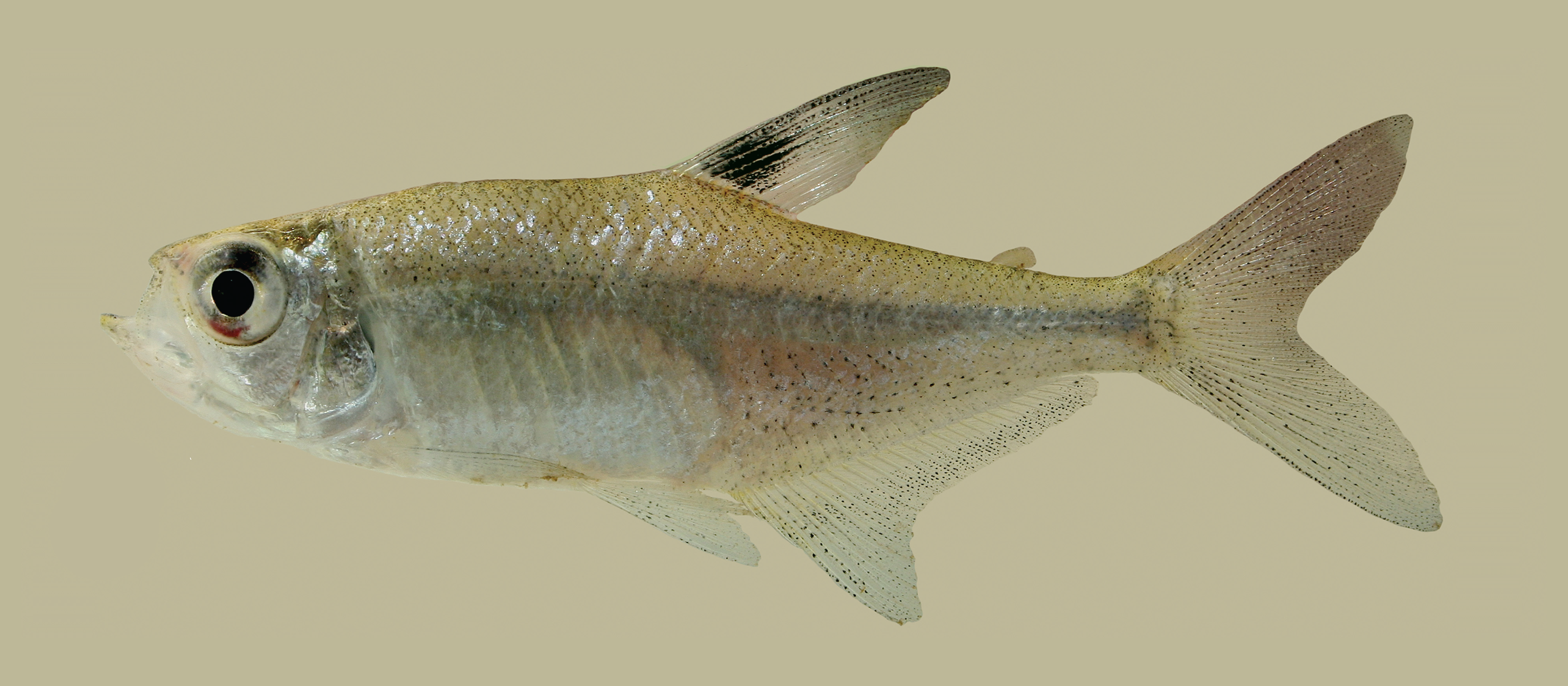
- Hyphessobrycon compressus

Scientific classification
- Kingdom: Animalia
- Phylum: Chordata
- Class: Actinopterygii
- Order: Characiformes
- Family: Acestrorhamphidae
- Subfamily: Hyphessobryconinae; Lima, Carvalho & Faria, 2024

Type genus
- Hyphessobrycon Durbin, 1908

Genera
- See text

= Hyphessobryconinae =

Subfamily of fishes

Hyphessobryconinae is a subfamily of freshwater ray-finned fishes belonging to the family Acestrorhamphidae, the American tetras. The fishes in this subfamily are found in South America.

== Genera ==
Hyphessobryconinae contains the following genera:

- Dinotopterygium Frainer, Carvalho, Bertaco & Malabarba, 2021
- Erythrocharax Netto-Ferreira, Birindelli, Sousa, Mariguela & Oliveira, 2013
- Hyphessobrycon Durbin, 1908
- Parecbasis C. H. Eigenmann, 1914
- Phycocharax Ohara, Mirande & F. C. T. Lima, 2017
