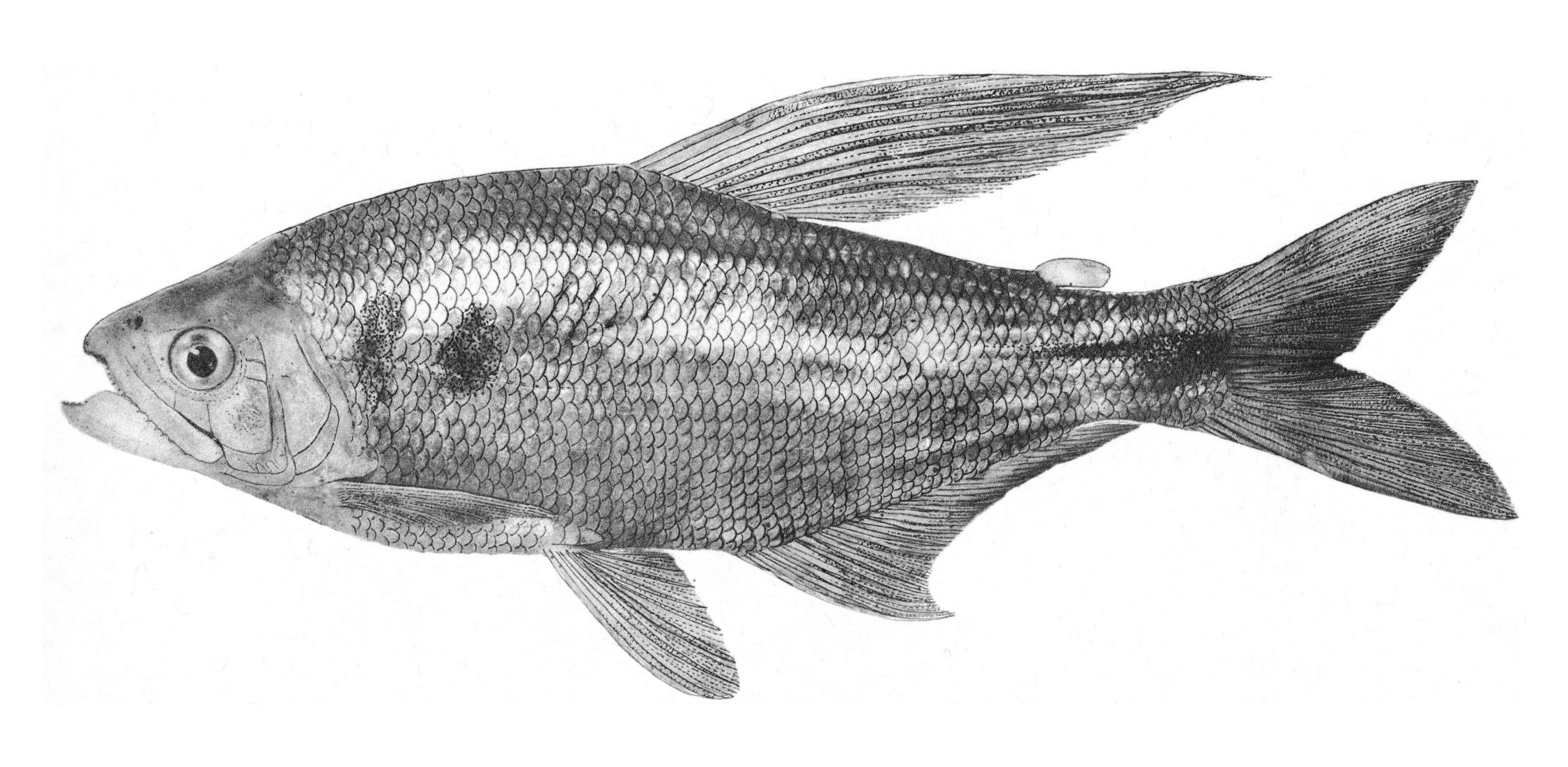
- Parastremma sadina

Scientific classification
- Kingdom: Animalia
- Phylum: Chordata
- Class: Actinopterygii
- Order: Characiformes
- Family: Acestrorhamphidae
- Subfamily: Rhoadsiinae
- Genus: Parastremma; C. H. Eigenmann, 1912

Type species
- Parastremma sadina C. H. Eigenmann, 1912

= Parastremma =

Genus of fishes

Parastremma is a genus of freshwater ray-finned fishes belonging to the family Acestrorhamphidae, the American characins. The fishes in this genus are endemic to western Colombia.

== Species ==
Paratremma contains the following valid species:

- Parastremma album Dahl, 1960
- Parastremma pulchrum Dahl, 1960
- Parastremma sadina C. H. Eigenmann, 1912
