= Tucanoichthys =

Conservation status
- Least Concern (IUCN 3.1)

Scientific classification
- Kingdom: Animalia
- Phylum: Chordata
- Class: Actinopterygii
- Order: Characiformes
- Family: Acestrorhamphidae
- Subfamily: Tyttobryconinae
- Genus: Tucanoichthys; Géry & U. Römer, 1997
- Species: T. tucano

Binomial name
- Tucanoichthys tucano Géry & U. Römer, 1997

Species of fish

Tucanoichthys is a monospecific genus of freshwater ray-finned fish belonging to the family Acestrorhamphidae, the American characins. The only species in the genus is Tucanoichthys tucano, a characin which is endemic to Brazil, where it is found in the Uaupés River.
