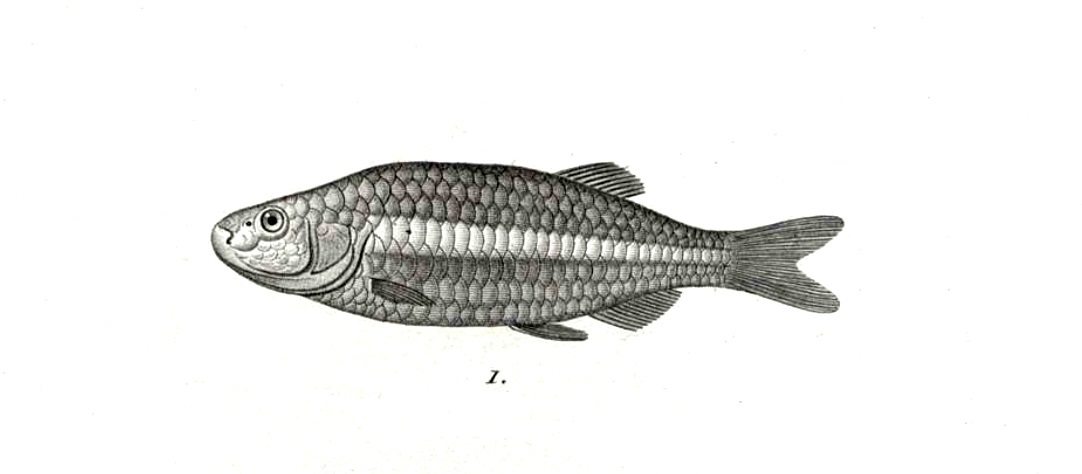
- G. bogotensis

Scientific classification
- Kingdom: Animalia
- Phylum: Chordata
- Class: Actinopterygii
- Order: Characiformes
- Family: Acestrorhamphidae
- Subfamily: Grundulinae
- Genus: Grundulus; Valenciennes in Cuvier & Valenciennes, 1846

Type species
- Poecilia bogotensis Humboldt, 1821

Synonyms
- Ctenocharax Regan, 1907; Rhodeoides Thominot, 1884

= Grundulus =

Genus of fishes

Grundulus is a genus of freshwater ray-finned fishes belonging to the family Acestrorhamphidae, the American characins. The fishes in this genus are found in Colombia and Ecuador in South America. A biogeographical analysis in 2010 found they are endemic to coldwater lakes of glacial origin in the northern Andes mountain range.

== Species ==
There are currently three described species:

- Grundulus bogotensis (Humboldt, 1821)
- Grundulus cochae Román-Valencia, Paepke & Pantoja, 2003
- Grundulus quitoensis Román-Valencia, Ruiz-Calderón & Barriga, 2005
