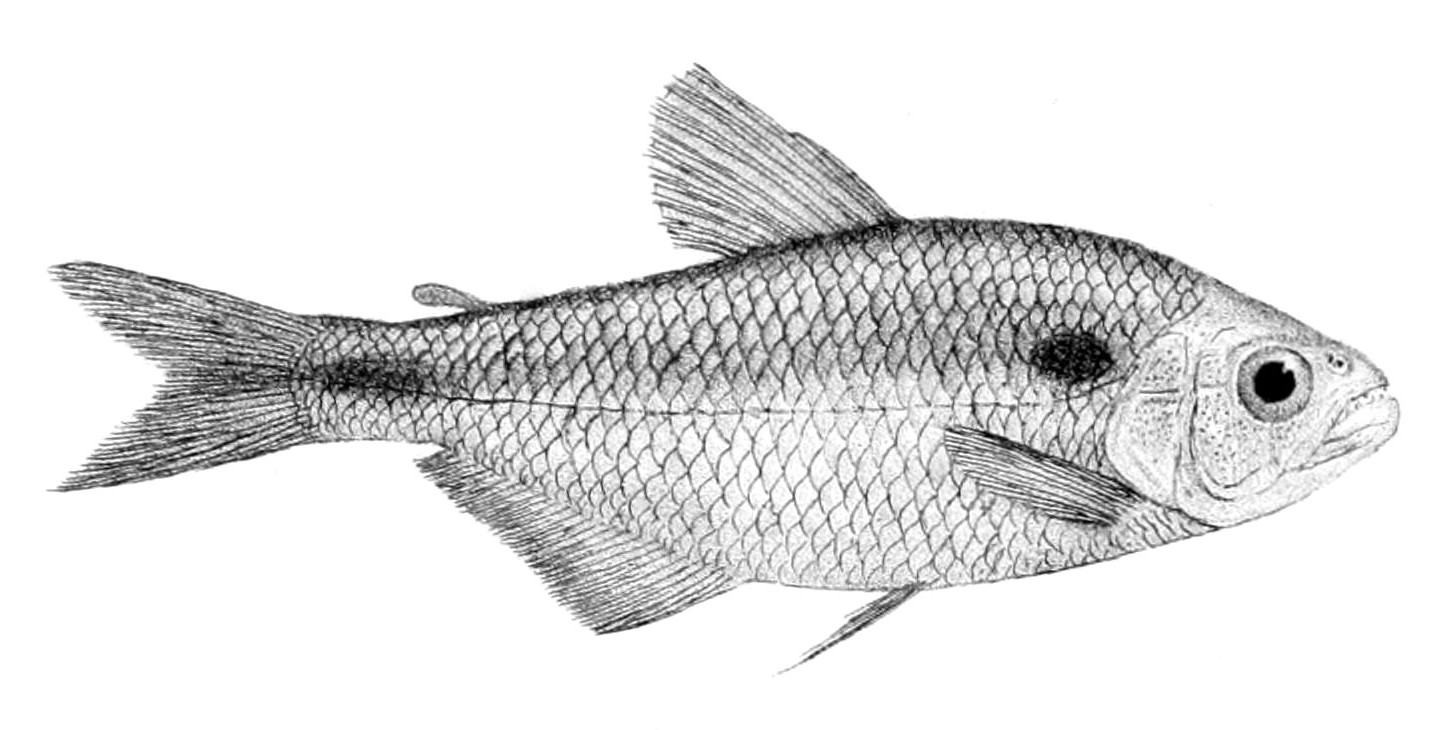

Conservation status
- Least Concern (IUCN 3.1)

Scientific classification
- Kingdom: Animalia
- Phylum: Chordata
- Class: Actinopterygii
- Order: Characiformes
- Family: Acestrorhamphidae
- Subfamily: Grundulinae
- Genus: Astyanacinus; C. H. Eigenmann, 1907
- Species: A. moorii

Binomial name
- Astyanacinus moorii (Boulenger, 1892)

Synonyms
- Tetragonopterus moorii Boulenger, 1892; Astyanax moorii (Boulenger, 1892)

= Astyanacinus =

Genus of fishes

Astyanacinus is a monospecific genus of freshwater ray-finned fish belonging to the family Acestrorhamphidae, the American characins. The only species in the genus is Astyanacinus moorii which is found in the Upper Paraguay River basin in Bolivia and Brazil. The specific name honours the English botanist Spencer Moore who collected the holotype.
