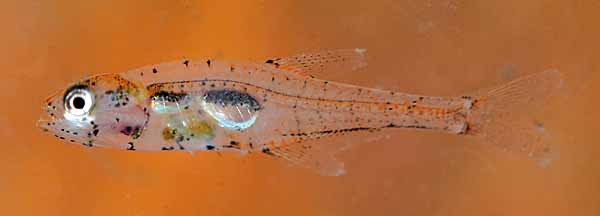

Scientific classification
- Kingdom: Animalia
- Phylum: Chordata
- Class: Actinopterygii
- Order: Characiformes
- Family: Acestrorhamphidae
- Genus: Priocharax
- Species: P. conwayi

Binomial name
- Priocharax conwayi Mattox, F. C. T. Lima, Britz, Souza & Oliveira, 2024

= Priocharax conwayi =

Species of fish

Priocharax conwayi is a minute species of freshwater ray-finned fish belonging to the family Acestrorhamphidae, the American characins. This fish is found in Brazil.

== Size ==
This species reaches a length of 1.9 cm (0.75 in).

== Etymology ==
The fish is named in honor of Kevin W. Conway of Texas A&M University, located in College Station, Texas, US.

== Biology ==
This species inhabits black water systems, including shallow riverine and slow-flowing forest streams with dense aquatic vegetation.
