= Pseudochalceus =

Scientific classification
- Kingdom: Animalia
- Phylum: Chordata
- Class: Actinopterygii
- Order: Characiformes
- Family: Acestrorhamphidae
- Subfamily: Rhoadsiinae
- Genus: Pseudochalceus; Kner, 1863

Genus of fishes

Pseudochalceus is a genus of characins from freshwater habitats in western Ecuador and western Colombia. Currently, four species in this genus are described:

- Pseudochalceus bohlkei Orcés-V. (es), 1967
- Pseudochalceus kyburzi L. P. Schultz, 1966
- Pseudochalceus lineatus Kner, 1863
- Pseudochalceus longianalis Géry, 1972
