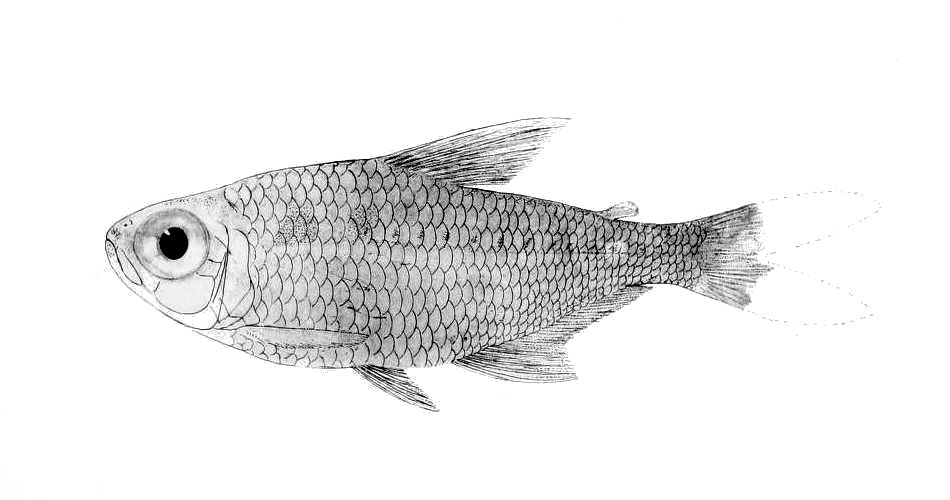
- 1917 illustration of Makunaima guaporensis, the type species

Scientific classification
- Kingdom: Animalia
- Phylum: Chordata
- Class: Actinopterygii
- Order: Characiformes
- Family: Acestrorhamphidae
- Subfamily: Megalamphodinae
- Genus: Makunaima; Terán, Benitez & Mirande, 2020

Type species
- Astyanax guaporensis C. H. Eigenmann, 1909

= Makunaima =

Genus of fishes

Makunaima is a genus of freshwater ray-finned fish belonging to the family Acestrorhamphidae, the American tetras. The fishes in this genus are found in South America.

== Taxonomy and systematics ==
Makunaima was formally proposed as a genus by the Argentine ichthyologists Guillermo Enrique Terán, Mauricio F. Benítez and Juan Marcos Mirande in 2020. The species within this genus were formerly allocated to Astyanax or Moenkhausia. The type species of the genus was designated as Astyanax guaporensis, which was first formally described in 1909 by Carl H. Eigenmann, with its type locality given as the Rio Guaporé at Maciel, Brazil. This genus is classified within the subfamily Megalamphodinae, the red tetras, of the American tetra family Acestrorhamphidae within the suborder Characoidei of the order Characiformes.

== Etymology ==
Etymologically, the genus name alludes to "Makunaima" (also transcribed as "Macunaima" or "Makonaima"), the name of a creator god for various ethnic groups in the Amazon.

== Species ==
Makunaima contains the following valid species:

- Makunaima guaporensis (C. H. Eigenmann, 1911)
- Makunaima guianensis (C. H. Eigenmann, 1909)
- Makunaima multidens (C. H. Eigenmann, 1908)
- Makunaima pittieri (C. H. Eigenmann, 1920)

== Distribution ==
Makunaima are found in South America, where they occur in the Essequibo, Amazon and Orinoco drainages in Bolivia, Brazil, Colombia, Guyana and Vevezuela; with one species, M. pittieri, being endemic to the drainage basin of Lake Valencia in Venezuela.
