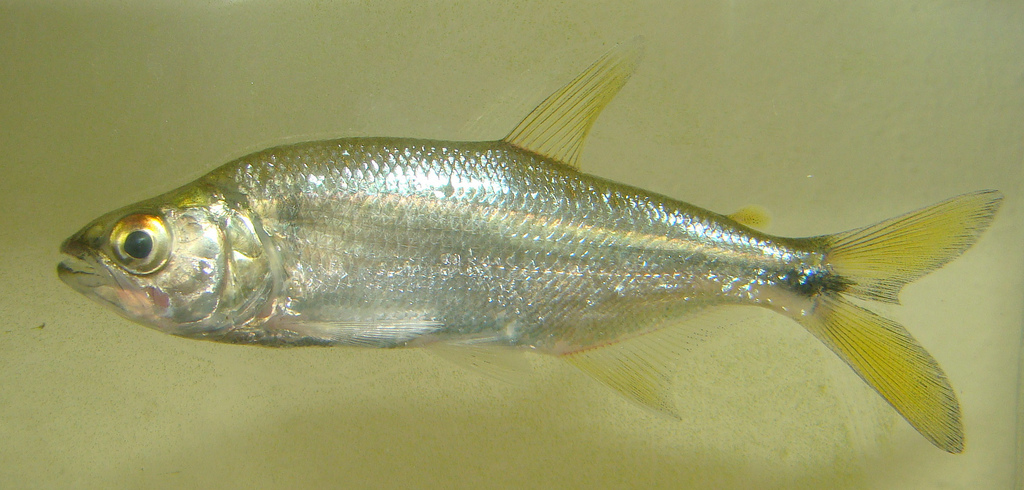
- Oligosarcus jenynsii

Scientific classification
- Kingdom: Animalia
- Phylum: Chordata
- Class: Actinopterygii
- Order: Characiformes
- Family: Acestrorhamphidae
- Subfamily: Acestrorhamphinae
- Genus: Oligosarcus; Günther, 1864

Type species
- Oligosarcus argenteus Günther, 1864

Synonyms
- Acestrorhamphus C. H. Eigenmann & C. H. Kennedy, 1903; Paroligosarcus Amaral Campos & Trewavas, 1949

= Oligosarcus =

Genus of fishes

Oligosarcus is a genus of freshwater ray-finned fishes belonging to the family Acestrorhamphidae, the American characins. The fishes in this genus are found in South America. They reach up to 31 cm (12 in) in length and are predators that mainly feed on smaller fish.

== Species ==
Oligosarcus contains the following valid species:

- Oligosarcus acutirostris Menezes, 1990
- Oligosarcus amome Almirón, Casciotta, Piálek, Doubnerová & Říčan, 2015
- Oligosarcus argenteus Günther, 1864
- Oligosarcus bolivianus (Fowler, 1940)
- Oligosarcus brevioris Menezes, 1990
- Oligosarcus hepsetus (Cuvier, 1829)
- Oligosarcus itau Mirande, Aguilera & Azpelicueta, 2011
- Oligosarcus jacuiensis Menezes & Ribeiro, 2010
- Oligosarcus jenynsii (Günther, 1864)
- Oligosarcus longirostris Menezes & Géry, 1983
- Oligosarcus macrolepis (Steindachner, 1877)
- Oligosarcus menezesi Miquelarena & Protogino, 1996
- Oligosarcus oligolepis (Steindachner, 1867)
- Oligosarcus paranensis Menezes & Géry, 1983
- Oligosarcus perdido Ribeiro, Cavallaro & Froehlich, 2007
- Oligosarcus pintoi Amaral Campos, 1945
- Oligosarcus planaltinae Menezes & Géry, 1983
- Oligosarcus platensis (Messner, 1962)
- Oligosarcus robustus Menezes, 1969
- Oligosarcus schindleri Menezes & Géry, 1983
- Oligosarcus solitarius Menezes, 1990
- Oligosarcus varii Menezes & Ribeiro, 2015
