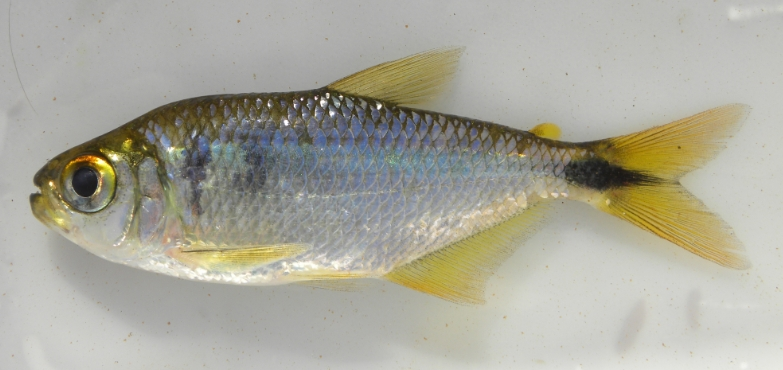
- Andromakhe saguazu

Scientific classification
- Kingdom: Animalia
- Phylum: Chordata
- Class: Actinopterygii
- Order: Characiformes
- Family: Acestrorhamphidae
- Subfamily: Acestrorhamphinae
- Genus: Andromakhe; Terán, Benitez & Mirande, 2020

Type species
- Astyanax latens Mirande, Aguilera & Azpelicueta, 2004

= Andromakhe =

Genus of fishes

Andromakhe is a genus of freshwater ray-finned fishes in the family Acestrorhamphidae, the American characins. These fishes are endemic to freshwater habitats in Argentina and Uruguay, where they are locally called Mojarra.

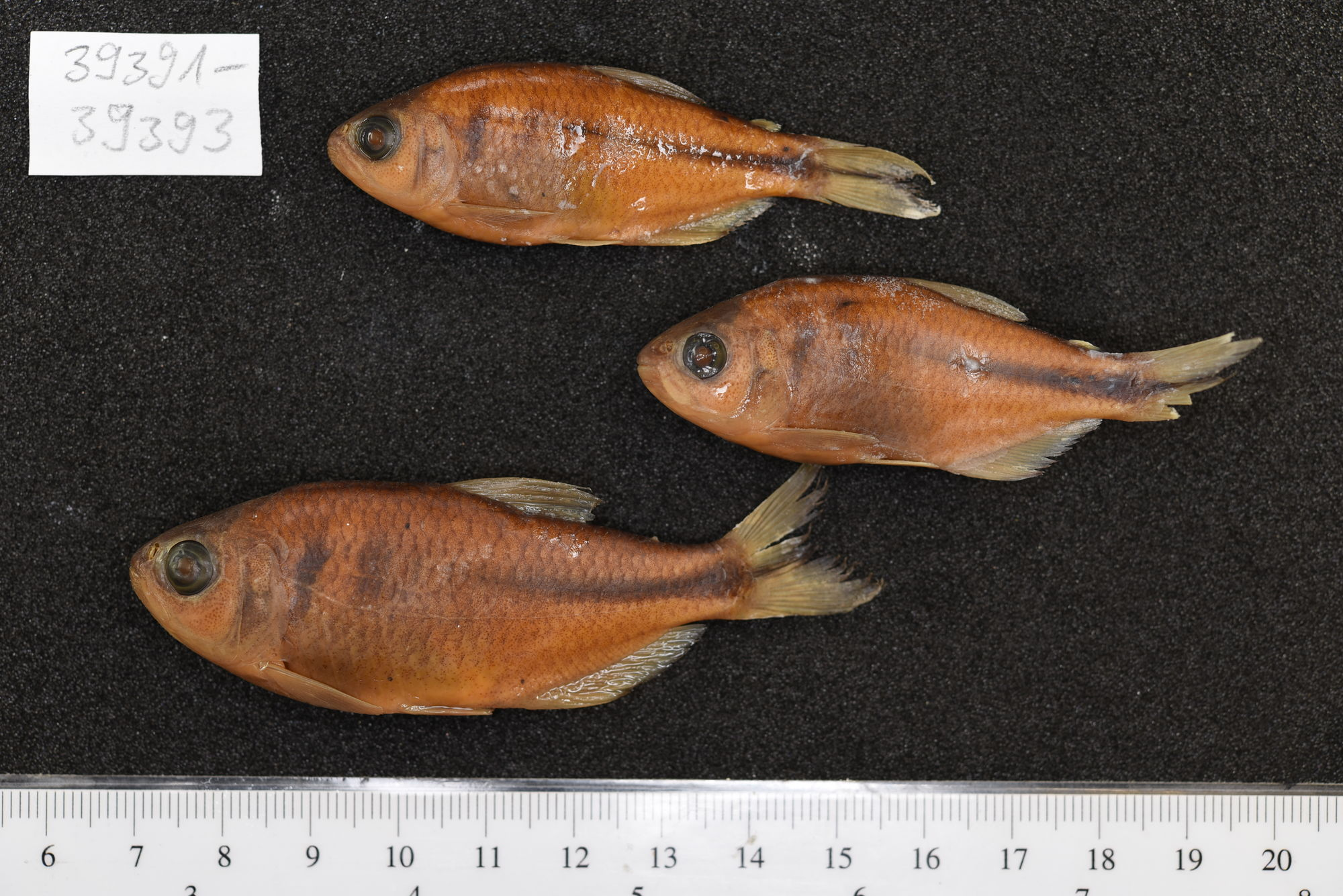
Preserved specimens of Andromakhe paris

== Taxonomy and systematics ==
Andromahke was first proposed as a genus in 2004 by Guillermo Enrique Terán, Mauricio F. Benítez and Juan Marcos Mirande with Astyanax latens designated as its type species. The species classified within this genus were previously classified in the genus Astyanax. This genus is classified in the subfamily Acestrorhamphinae in the American characin family Acestrorhamphidae. This family belongs to the suborder Characoidei of the order Characiformes.

== Species ==
There are four recognized species in this genus:

- Andromakhe latens (Mirande, Aguilera & Azpelicueta, 2004)
- Andromakhe paris (Azpelicueta, Almirón & Casciotta, 2002)
- Andromakhe stenohalina (Messner, 1962)
- Andromakhe tupi (Azpelicueta, Mirande, Almirón & Casciotta, 2003)
