= Ramirezella (fish) =

Scientific classification
- Kingdom: Animalia
- Phylum: Chordata
- Class: Actinopterygii
- Order: Characiformes
- Family: Acestrorhamphidae
- Subfamily: Thayeriinae
- Genus: Ramirezella; Fernández-Yépez, 1949

Type species
- Ramirezella newboldi Fernández-Yépez, 1949

Genus of fishes

Ramirezella is a genus of freshwater ray-finned fishes belonging to the family Acestrorhamphidae, the American characins. The fishes in this genus are found in South America.

== Species ==
Ramirezella contains the following valid species:

- Ramirezella newboldi Fernández-Yépez, 1949
- Ramirezella pyrophthalma (W. J. E. M. Costa, 1994)
