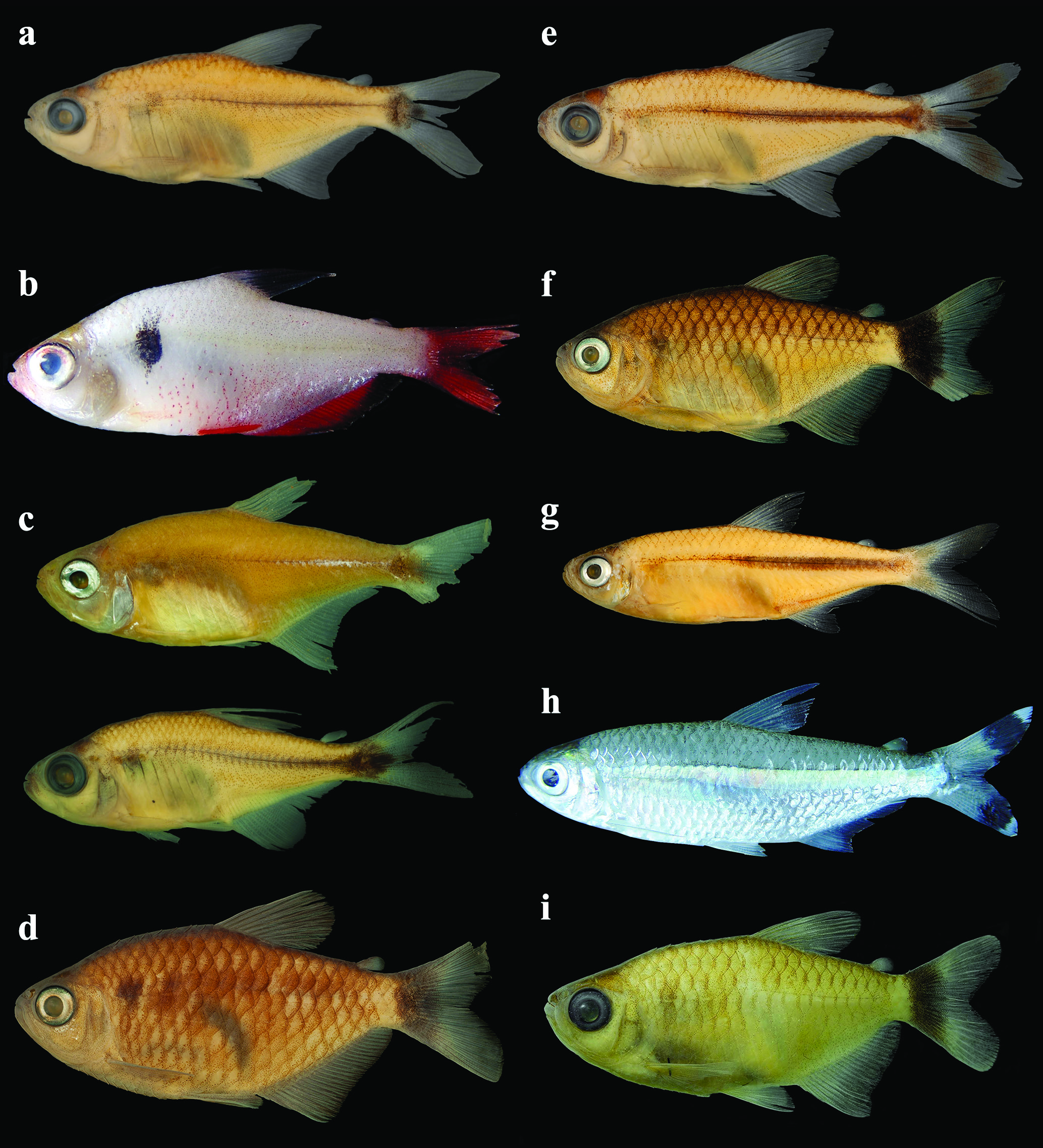
- Various acestrorhamphid species from the Paraná River basin

Scientific classification
- Kingdom: Animalia
- Phylum: Chordata
- Class: Actinopterygii
- Order: Characiformes
- Suborder: Characoidei
- Family: Acestrorhamphidae; C. H. Eigenmann, 1907

Type genus
- Acestrorhamphus C. H. Eigenmann & Kennedy, 1903

Subfamilies
- See text

= Acestrorhamphidae =

Family of fishes

Acestrorhamphidae, the American tetras, are a diverse family of freshwater fish in the order Characiformes. They are native to North and South America, from the southwestern United States south to temperate Argentina, with a few species introduced to other parts of the world. It includes many genera previously placed in the family Characidae, which was split into multiple families in 2024. It contains many of the most famous ornamental aquarium fish that are popularly known as tetras.

== Taxonomy ==
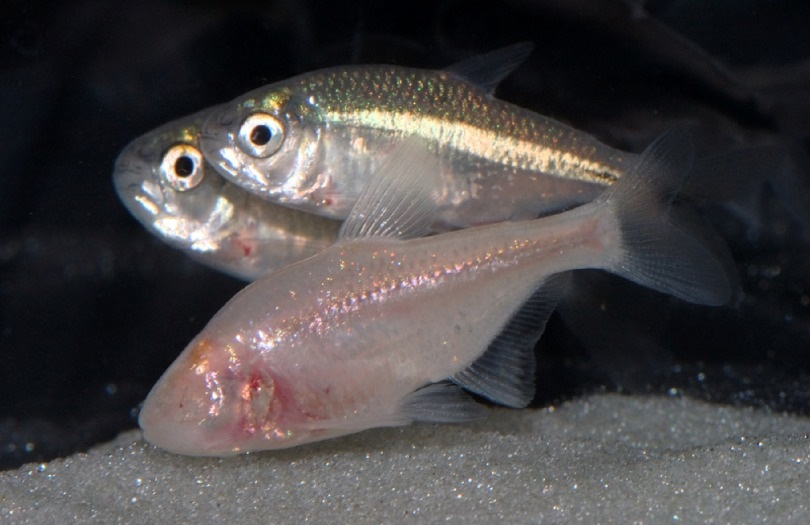
The Mexican tetra (Astyanax mexicanus) is the northernmost-living characiform, and has both surface and blind cave-dwelling morphs

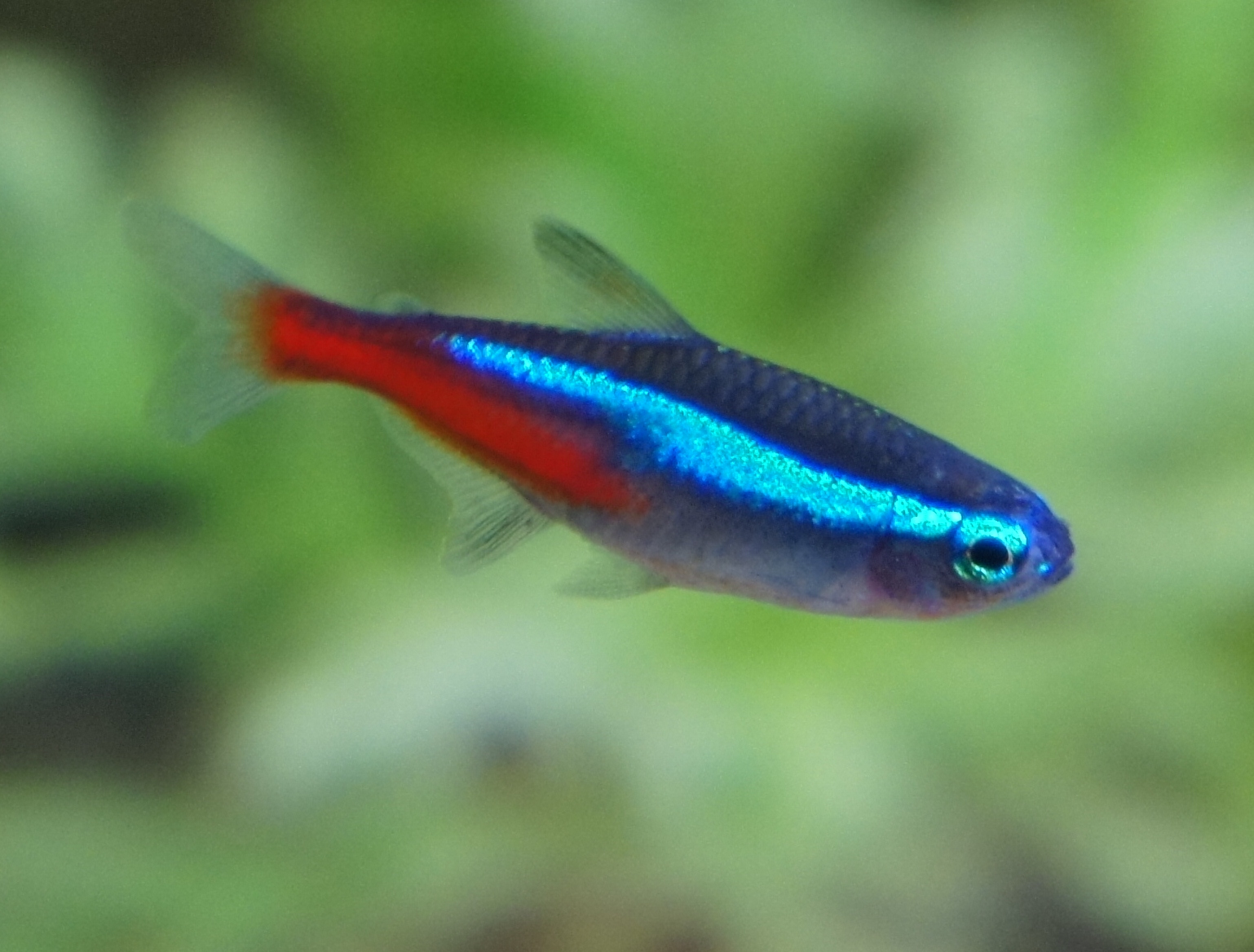
Neon tetra (Paracheirodon innesi)

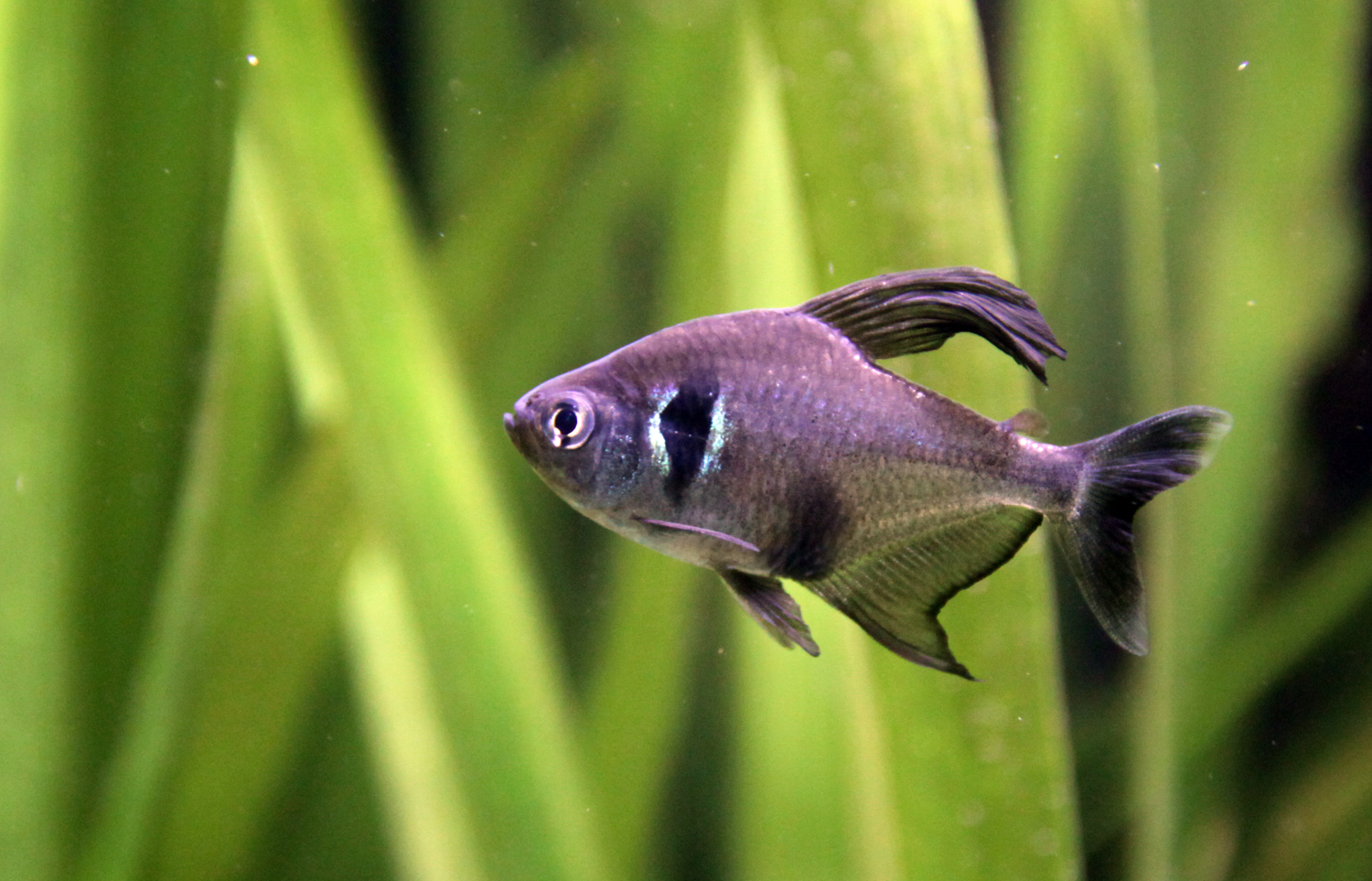
Black phantom tetra (Hyphessobrycon megalopterus)

The following taxonomy is based on Eschmeyer's Catalog of Fishes:

Family Acestrorhamphidae

- Subfamily Oxybryconinae Melo, Mattox & Oliveira, 2024
  - Oxybrycon Géry, 1964
- Subfamily Trochilocharacinae Melo, Mattox & Oliveira, 2024 (hummingbird characins)
  - Trochilocharax Zarske, 2010
- Subfamily Stygichthyinae Géry, 1972
  - Coptobrycon Géry, 1966
  - Deuterodon C. H. Eigenmann, 1907
  - Myxiops Zanata & Akama, 2004
  - Stygichthys Brittan & Böhlke, 1965
- Subfamily Megalamphodinae Carvalho, Lima & Melo, 2024 (red tetras)
  - Axelrodia Géry, 1965
  - Brittanichthys Géry, 1965
  - Makunaima Terán, Benitez & Mirande, 2020
  - Megalamphodus C. H. Eigenmann, 1915
  - Paracheirodon Géry, 1960
  - Petitella Géry & Boutière, 1964
- Subfamily Stichonodontinae C. H. Eigenmann, 1910
  - Hasemania Ellis, 1911
  - Moenkhausia C. H. Eigenmann, 1903
  - Nematocharax Weitzman, Menezes & Britski, 1986
  - Stichonodon C. H. Eigenmann, 1903
- Subfamily Stethaprioninae C. H. Eigenmann, 1907 (discus tetras)
  - Brachychalcinus Boulenger, 1892
  - Ectrepopterus Fowler, 1943
  - Orthospinus Reis, 1989
  - Poptella C. H. Eigenmann, 1908
  - Stethaprion Cope, 1870
- Subfamily Pristellinae Géry & Boutière, 1964
  - Hemigrammus Gill, 1858
  - Gymnocorymbus C. H. Eigenmann, 1908
  - Pristella C. H. Eigenmann, 1908
- Subfamily Jupiabinae Benine & Ota, 2024
  - Jupiaba Zanata, 1997
- Subfamily Tyttobryconinae Mattox & Melo, 2024
  - Priocharax Weitzman & Vari, 1987
  - Tucanoichthys Géry & Römer, 1997
  - Tyttobrycon Géry, 1973
- Subfamily Hyphessobryconinae Lima, Carvalho & Faria, 2024 (multicusp characins)
  - Dinotopterygium Frainer, Carvalho, Bertaco & Malabarba, 2021
  - Erythrocharax Netto-Ferreira, Birindelli, Sousa, Mariguela & Oliveira, 2013
  - Hyphessobrycon Durbin, 1908
  - Parecbasis C. H. Eigenmann, 1914
  - Phycocharax Ohara, Mirande & Lima, 2017
- Subfamily Thayeriinae Ota, Reia & Benine, 2024
  - Bario Myers, 1940
  - Bryconella Géry, 1965
  - Hollandichthys C. H. Eigenmann, 1909
  - Holopristis C. H. Eigenmann, 1903
  - Inpaichthys Géry & Junk, 1977
  - Parapristella Géry, 1964
  - Rachoviscus Myers, 1926
  - Ramirezella Fernández-Yépez, 1949
  - Thayeria C. H. Eigenmann, 1908
- Subfamily Rhoadsiinae Fowler, 1911 (Pacific characins)
  - Carlana Strand, 1928
  - Nematobrycon C. H. Eigenmann, 1911
  - Parastremma C. H. Eigenmann, 1912
  - Pseudochalceus Kner, 1863
  - Rhoadsia Fowler, 1911
- Subfamily Grundulinae Fowler, 1958
  - Astyanacinus C. H. Eigenmann, 1907
  - Grundulus Valenciennes, 1846
- Subfamily Acestrorhamphinae C. H. Eigenmann, 1907
  - Andromakhe Terán, Benitez & Mirande, 2020
  - Astyanax Baird & Girard, 1854
  - Ctenobrycon C. H. Eigenmann, 1908
  - Oligosarcus Günther, 1864
  - Psalidodon C. H. Eigenmann, 1911
