= Spotted piranha =

Spotted piranha can refer to either of 2 species of these fish:

- Serrasalmus maculatus (literally meaning "spotted pirambeba")
- Serrasalmus rhombeus (redeye piranha)
