= Ruby-red piranha =

Ruby-red piranha can refer to either of 2 species of these fish:

- Serrasalmus rhombeus (redeye piranha)
- Serrasalmus sanchezi (sharp-snouted piranha)
