= Black piranha =

Black piranha can refer to either of 2 species of these fish:

- Serrasalmus rhombeus (redeye piranha) which includes the fish formerly known as S. niger
- Serrasalmus spilopleura (speckled piranha)
