= Caribe pinche =

Caribe pinche (literally "mediocre piranha") is a local term for either of 2 species of piranha:

- Serrasalmus elongatus (elongated piranha)
- Serrasalmus irritans (iridescent piranha)
