= Blue Tiger =

Blue Tiger and Blue Tigers may refer to:

- Maltese tiger, a suspected (but exceedingly rare) blue-coloured tiger
- Blue tigers, the butterfly genus Tirumala
  - Tirumala limniace, an Indian milkweed butterfly species
  - Tirumala hamata, another Indian milkweed butterfly species
- "Blue Tigers", a 1977 short story
- ADtranz DE-AC33C, a diesel electric railway locomotive, nicknamed the "Blue Tiger"
- Blue Tiger (film), a 1994 action/thriller directed by Norberto Barba
- Blue Tigers, a moniker for the India men's national football team
- Blue tiger piranha, a species of the fish genus Serrasalmus

== See also ==
- Blue Tigresses, the India women's national football team
