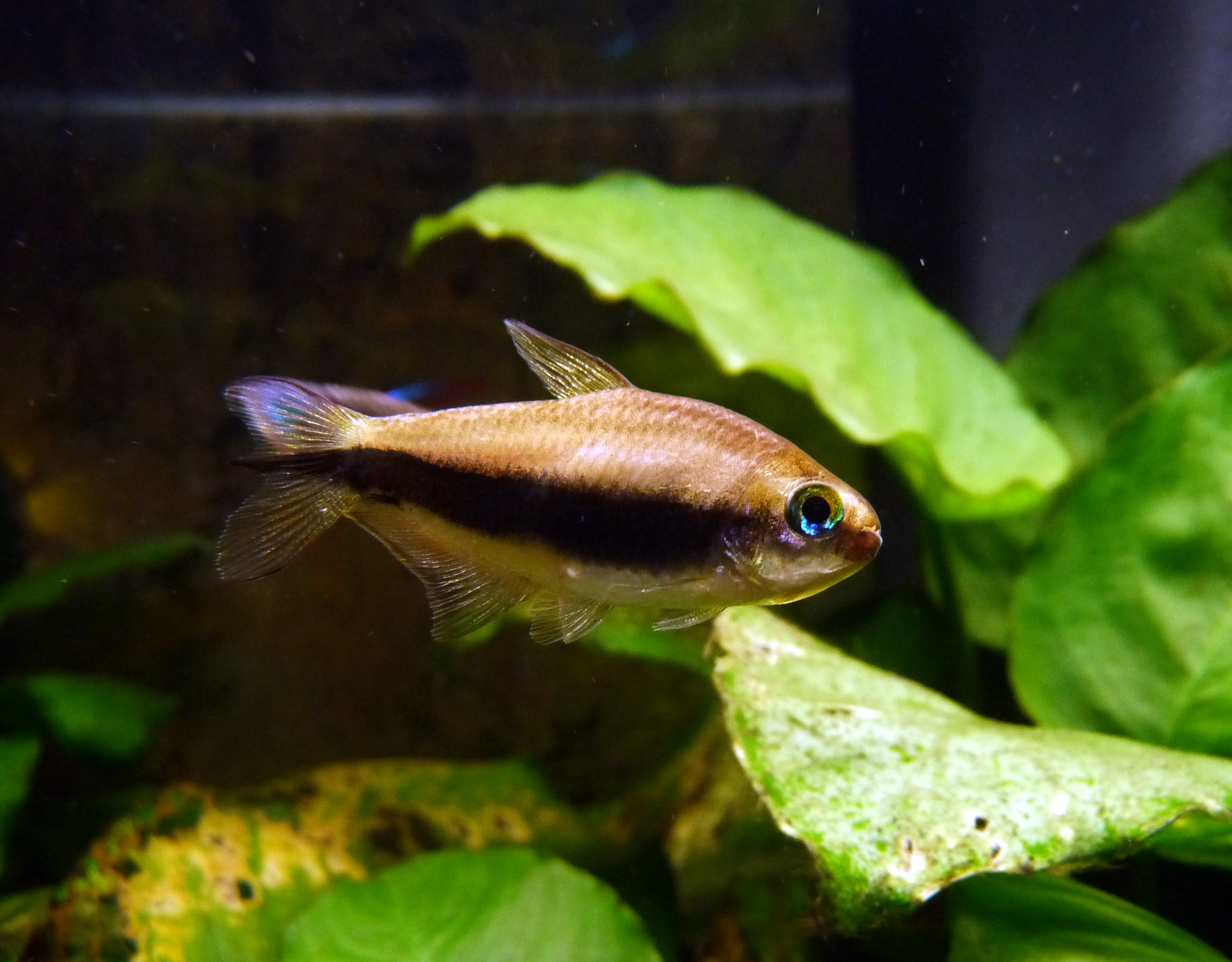
- Nematobrycon palmeri

Scientific classification
- Kingdom: Animalia
- Phylum: Chordata
- Class: Actinopterygii
- Order: Characiformes
- Family: Acestrorhamphidae
- Subfamily: Rhoadsiinae
- Genus: Nematobrycon; C. H. Eigenmann, 1911

Type species
- Nematobrycon palmeri C. H. Eigenmann, 1911

= Nematobrycon =

Genus of fishes

Nematobrycon is a genus of freshwater ray-finned fishes belonging to the family Acestrorhamphidae, the American characins. The fishes in this genus are endemic to the Atrato and San Juan River basins in western Colombia.

== Species ==
Nematobrycon contains the following valid species:

- Nematobrycon lacortei S. H. Weitzman & W. L. Fink, 1971 (rainbow tetra)
- Nematobrycon palmeri C. H. Eigenmann, 1911 (emperor tetra)
