= Caribe dorado =

Caribe dorado (literally "gilt piranha) is a local term for either of 2 species of piranha:

- Serrasalmus gibbus (Castelnau's piranha)
- Serrasalmus spilopleura (speckled piranha)
