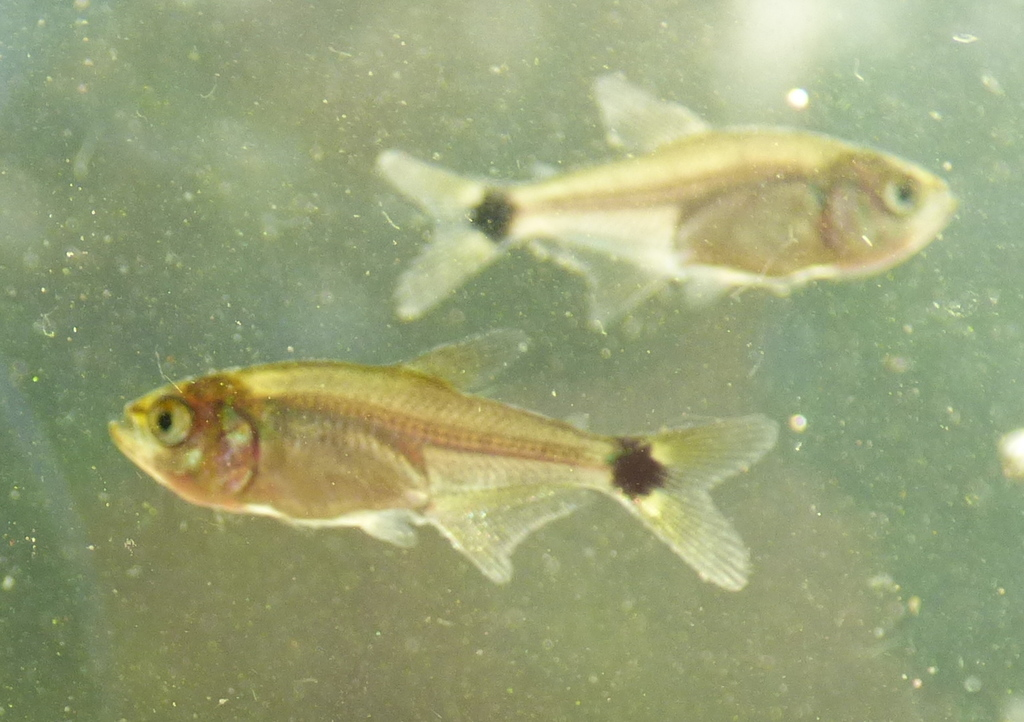
- Odontostilbe paraguayensis

Scientific classification
- Kingdom: Animalia
- Phylum: Chordata
- Class: Actinopterygii
- Order: Characiformes
- Family: Characidae
- Subfamily: Cheirodontinae
- Genus: Odontostilbe; Cope, 18703

Type species
- Odontostilbe fugitiva Cope, 1870

Synonyms
- Lobodeuterodon Fowler, 1945

= Odontostilbe =

Genus of fishes

Odontostilbe is a genus of freshwater ray-finned fishes, characins, belonging to the family Characidae. The fishes in this genus are found in Central and South America.

== Species ==
Odontostilbecontains the following valid species:

- Odontostilbe avanhandava Chuctaya, Bührnheim & Malabarba, 2018
- Odontostilbe dialeptura (Fink & Weitzman, 1974)
- Odontostilbe dierythrura Fowler, 1940
- Odontostilbe ecuadorensis Bührnheim & Malabarba, 2006
- Odontostilbe euspilura (Fowler, 1945)
- Odontostilbe fugitiva Cope, 1870
- Odontostilbe microcephala C. H. Eigenmann, 1907
- Odontostilbe mitoptera (Fink & Weitzman, 1974)
- Odontostilbe nareuda Bührnheim & Malabarba, 2006
- Odontostilbe pacaasnovos Chuctaya, Ohara & Malabarba, 2020
- Odontostilbe pao Bührnheim & Malabarba, 2007
- Odontostilbe paraguayensis Eigenmann & Kennedy, 1903
- Odontostilbe parecis Bührnheim & Malabarba, 2006
- Odontostilbe pulchra (Gill, 1858)
- Odontostilbe roloffi Géry, 1972
- Odontostilbe splendida Bührnheim & Malabarba, 2007
- Odontostilbe weitzmani Chuctaya, Bührnheim & Malabarba, 2018
