= Blue tiger piranha =

Conservation status
- Least Concern (IUCN 3.1)

Scientific classification
- Kingdom: Animalia
- Phylum: Chordata
- Class: Actinopterygii
- Order: Characiformes
- Family: Serrasalmidae
- Genus: Serrasalmus
- Species: S. gouldingi

Binomial name
- Serrasalmus gouldingi Fink & Machado-Allison, 1992

Species of fish

The blue tiger piranha (Serrasalmus gouldingi), also known as Goulding's piranha, is a species of Serrasalmus fish from the Amazon basin in Brazil. This ray-finned fish is only found in South America.

This fish only lives in freshwater environments and is able to survive in mineral-poor water. S. gouldingi returns to the Anapu River to reproduce. It also establishes feeding colonies when hunting for other fish or scavenging for fruits and seeds.

== Description ==
The blue tiger piranha has blue-gray scales, a small rhomboid body, a robust head, large eyes, and a pugnacious lower jaw. These fish are small for piranhas, as their length is usually around 13–15 cm (5–6 in) long, with a maximum length of 30 cm (12 in), while other piranhas average around 20 cm (8 in) and have a maximum length of 40 cm (16 in). S. gouldingi has 2 unbranched and 14-16 branched dorsal fin rays with a pre-anal spine. Additionally, it has 13-17 dorsal soft rays, 29-33 anal soft rays and 36 - 38 vertebrae. It has a proximal black band on its caudal fin, vertically elongated stripes on the lateral body, and no prominent vertical humeral blotch.

As a juvenile, the gills and rest of the body is yellow with elongated rounded dots on its scales. These dots are dark and may dominate its body up to the gill cover. In its adult stage, it retains the yellow color on its body, with some red coloration developing near the gill area and ventral stomach, while the elongated spots disappear. Juvenile S. gouldingi have a transparent caudal fin with a black wedge, and as they age, the caudal fin becomes completely dark and the irises change to a silvery color.

Due to their coloration, length, and juvenile anatomy, S. gouldingi is often confused with Serrasalmus manueli and Serrasalmus rhombeus. S. gouldingi and S. manueli are visually identical in their juvenile stages, both being transparent and sharing coloration. As both species age, S. manueli develops a uniform black coloration while S. gouldingi becomes more vibrantly colored, with its only dark parts on its tail. Compared to S. rhombeus, both S. gouldingi and S. manueli have a similar compressed body shape with silver-gray coloration, but S. rhombeus can grow up to 40 cm (16 in) and has a more robust jaw and thicker body.

The teeth showcase the feeding diet of these creatures. Blue tiger piranhas are mostly carnivorous and minorly frugivorous, eating meat and fish and to a lesser extent fruits and nuts. When hunting prey, the blue tiger piranha will target specific areas, such as the caudal peduncle of other fishes.

== Taxonomy ==
The subfamily Serrasalminae encompasses 16 genera restricted to the neotropical region, including pacus and piranhas in the Amazon Basin. Serrasalmids are keystone ecological taxa, being major riverine predators and the primary seed dispersers in the flooded forest.

Despite their widespread occurrence and notable ecologies, serrasalmid evolutionary history and systematics are controversial. S. altispinnis, S. gouldingi, and S. serrulatus have 18S rDNA and 5S rDNA. Analysis of specimens and a literature review suggest this clade is also characterized by the presence of a pre-anal spine and ectopterygoid teeth.

== Etymology ==
The name "Serrasalmus" is from the Latin serra (meaning saw) and salmus (meaning salmon), referencing a serrated keel along the stomach. The "gouldingii" species epithet refers to ecologist Michael Goulding, in honor of his efforts in collecting Amazonian fishes.

== Distribution and habitat ==
The geographic range of the blue tiger piranha is composed of the Amazon and Orinoco River basins of South America, particularly the Rio Negro, Rio Japura, and Rio Casiquiare of Columbia, Venezuela, Peru and Brazil. S. gouldingi prefers mineral-poor blackwater river environments with brownish, tannin-stained water, with a 4.0-7.0 pH and temperature of 24–28 °C (75–82 °F).

== Life history ==
Despite mostly populating the Rio Negro, Rio Japura, and Rio Casiquiare, the blue tiger piranha relocates to the "drowned" rivers of Anapu for reproduction and feeding. This happens because the reproductive patterns are influenced by the fluctuation of the flood pulse, temperature, and physical/chemical characteristics of the environment.

In a 2010-11 sample of 262 fish, it was discovered that S. gouldingi mature well or rather reach sexual maturity, depending on their size. In males, sexual maturation began at 12.24 cm (4.82 in). In females, sexual maturation began at 16.33 cm (6.43 in). Both individuals start to reproduce when the river levels are favored. Two major reproductive peaks occur during transitional flood and ebb periods; during this time, female piranhas become more dominant, and they have a much higher frequency of faster maturing, spawned, spent, and resting gonadal stages. The increase in population, the blue tiger piranha's concern of condition factors during peak reproductive activity has decreased; this occurred before the fluctuations of the river levels.

Both juvenile and adult blue tiger piranhas have feeding ecology variations in the Anapu river region. When water levels are lower due to drought, blue tiger piranhas prey on other fish more extensively, as opposed to times of river flooding, when their diet is composed of more fruits and seeds. During flood season, S. gouldingi has a more omnivorous diet than its usual heavily carnivorous, fish-eating one, due to the higher availability of a variety of food resources. The flood poles of the Anapu River in particular heavily influence the blue tiger piranha's food ecology. The lower regions of the Anapu River are prone to natural damming of its streams, influenced by both tides and outflow, resulting in reduced annual flood pulse. S. gouldingi is among the most abundant fish species in this region.

Juveniles and adults show a different variation pattern in feeding intensity and niche breadth. S. gouldingi populations in the lower Anapu region can be characterized as omnivorous with strong piscivorous tendencies. Changes in feeding ecology of the species were unrelated to individuals' life stage, once juveniles and adults showed similar diet composition and feeding intensity. Other prey S. gouldingi eats are chironomid larvae, earthworms and shellfish.

== Conservation status ==
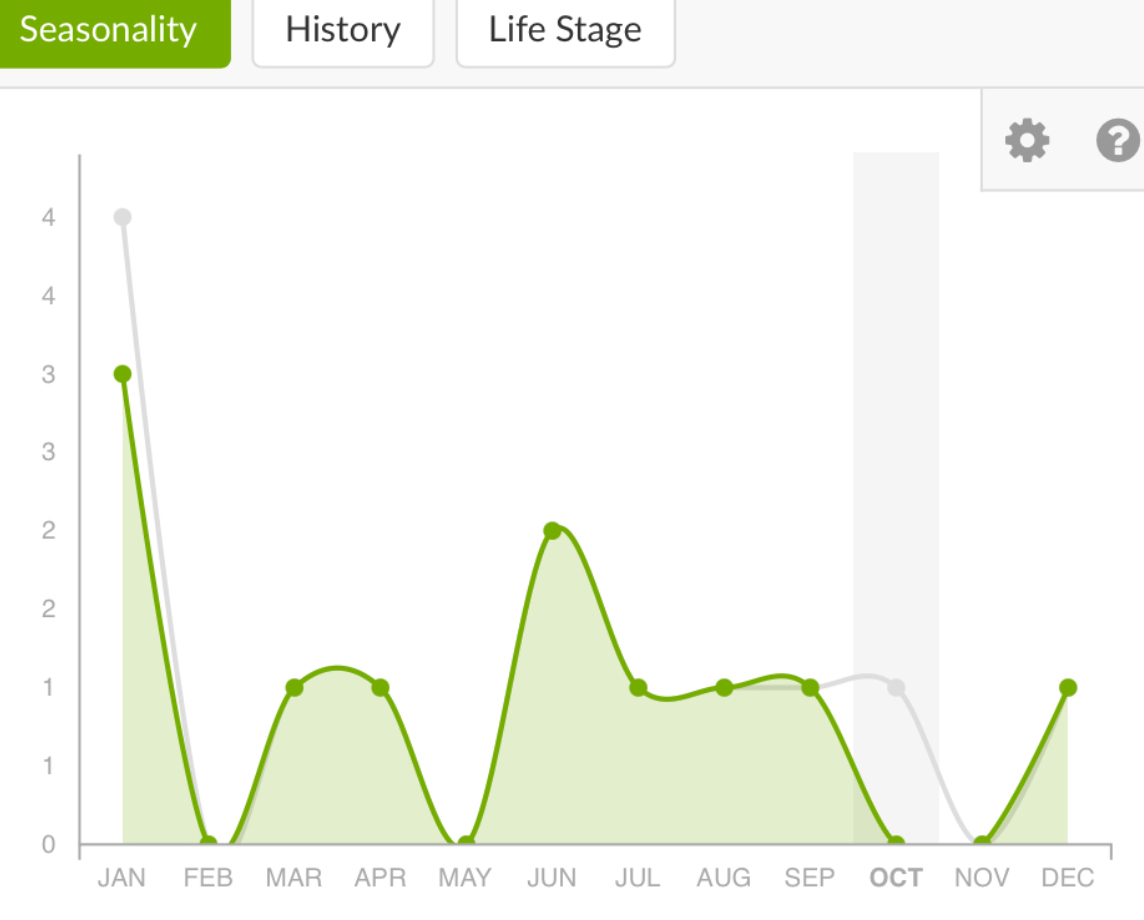
Data Graph of Blue Tiger piranha

The current global conservation status of the blue tiger piranha is least concern. It has low fishing vulnerability, as populations recovers quickly from heavy fishing and no evidence of large commercial sellers (as opposed to small-scale local markets) has been found. This may be because that piranhas may attack humans if approached in the water.

Major threats to the blue tiger piranha population include hydropower dams, which can alter the river flow, habitat loss, and climate change. Climate change-induced drought frequency may lead the piranhas to overrely on other fish as a food source and subsequently starve. Climate change may also affect river discharge, water temperatures, floodplain connectivity, and water chemistry, all of which severely disrupt piranha feeding, breeding, and physiological stress. A minor threat to the S. gouldingi is its slow reproductive rate, as this piranha only reproduces in one area at a certain time. If floods are smaller or arrive at the wrong time, juvenile survival drops and development into adult population declines.
