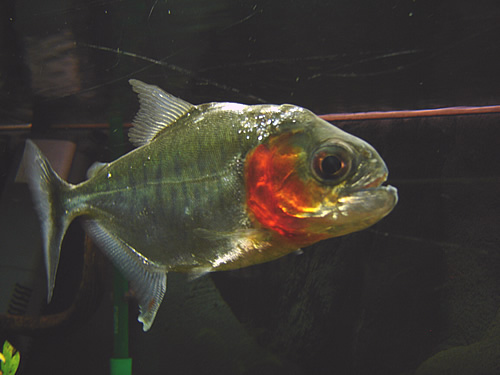

Conservation status
- Least Concern (IUCN 3.1)

Scientific classification
- Kingdom: Animalia
- Phylum: Chordata
- Class: Actinopterygii
- Division: Teleostei
- Order: Characiformes
- Family: Serrasalmidae
- Genus: Serrasalmus
- Species: S. manueli

Binomial name
- Serrasalmus manueli (Fernández-Yépez & Ramírez, 1967)

Synonyms
- Pygocentrus manueli Fernández-Yépez & Ramírez, 1967

= Serrasalmus manueli =

Species of piranha

Serrasalmus manueli, the silver piranha or Manuel's piranha, is a species of freshwater ray-finned fish belonging to the family Serrasalmidae, which includes the pacus, piranhas and related fishes. This species is found in the basins of the Amazon and Orinoco Rivers in South America.

== Taxonomy ==
Serrasalmus manueli was first formally described as Pygocentrus manueli in 1967 by the Venezuelan ichthyologists Agustín Fernández Yépez and Manuel Vicente Ramírez, with its type locality given as the Río Paraguaza in the middle Orinoco River system, Venezuela. In 2002, it was reclassified in the genus Serrasalmus, which is classified in the subfamily Serrasalminae of the family Serrasalmidae.

== Etymology ==
Serrasalmus manueli belongs to the genus Serrasalmus. This name combines the Latin serra, meaning "saw", with salmus, from salmo, "salmon". This is a reference to the serrated ventral keel and the salmon-like adipose fin. The specific name honours the second son of Manuel Vicente Ramírez, Manuel, who died young, and who was a companion on the author's expeditions.

== Description ==
Serrasalmus manueli has a maximum standard length of 36 cm (14 in) and a maximum published weight of 2.5 kg (5.5 lb). The younger fish are very distinctive, having an elongated body, suggesting that they are quick and agile swimmers. The juveniles have a concave dorsal profile to the head, with a long and sharp lower jaw and outsized eyes. These young fish have a greenish tinge on their sides and green vertical bands. As these fish mature, the head beomes convex, and the largest individuals resemble Pygocentrus rather than Serrasalmus piranhas. The adults have better proportioned eyes and the greenish cast and bands gradually fade, until they disappear completely. Fishes with a length greater than 5 to 7 cm (2.0 to 2.8 in) have brightly colored gill covers, varying in colour from yellow through orange to deep red, with an obvious black spot on the "shoulder", which increases in size as the fish gets older.

== Distribution and habitat ==
Serrasalmus manueli is found in the basins of the Amazon and Orinoco Rivers in Brazil, Colombia and Venezuela. This omnivorous, pelagic species is found in rivers, creeks and lakes.
