= Nematobrycon lacortei =

Conservation status
- Data Deficient (IUCN 3.1)

Scientific classification
- Kingdom: Animalia
- Phylum: Chordata
- Class: Actinopterygii
- Order: Characiformes
- Family: Acestrorhamphidae
- Genus: Nematobrycon
- Species: N. lacortei

Binomial name
- Nematobrycon lacortei S. H. Weitzman & W. L. Fink, 1971

Species of fish

Nematobrycon lacortei, the rainbow tetra, is a species of freshwater ray-finned fish belonging to the family Acestrorhamphidae, the American tetras. This fish is a Colombian endemic with its range restricted to the San Juan and Calima river basins. The rainbow tetra has a maximum standard length of 3.6 cm (1.4 in).
