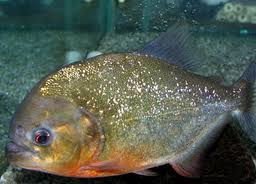

Scientific classification
- Kingdom: Animalia
- Phylum: Chordata
- Class: Actinopterygii
- Order: Characiformes
- Family: Serrasalmidae
- Genus: Serrasalmus
- Species: S. neveriensis

Binomial name
- Serrasalmus neveriensis Machado-Allison, W. L. Fink, López Rojas & Rodenas, 1993

= Serrasalmus neveriensis =

Species of fish

Serrasalmus neveriensis, also called the Neveri piranha, is a species of serrasalmid found in South America in the coastal rivers of Venezuela.
