= Serrasalmus careospinus =

Conservation status
- Endangered (IUCN 3.1)

Scientific classification
- Kingdom: Animalia
- Phylum: Chordata
- Class: Actinopterygii
- Order: Characiformes
- Family: Serrasalmidae
- Genus: Serrasalmus
- Species: S. careospinus

Binomial name
- Serrasalmus careospinus (W. L. Fink & Machado-Allison, 1992)

Synonyms
- Pristobrycon careospinus Fink & Machado-Allison, 1992

Species of fish

Serrasalmus careospinus is a species of freshwater ray-finned fish belonging to the family Serrasalmidae, which includes the pacus, piranhas and related fishes. This fish is endemic to Venezuela.

== Habitat ==
This fish lives mainly in black or acidic waters in Amazonas State of Venezuela (High Orinoco). The type locality is a lagoon near San Fernando de Atabapo in the confluence of the Atabapo and Orinoco rivers in Venezuela.

== Description ==
This is a beautiful fish. The body is discoid with the anterodorsal profile slightly curved in a "S" shape. The head is robust and wide, with a blunt snout. The preanal spine and ectopterygoid teeth are absent. The adipose fin is wide. The head is silver, and metallic orange to red at the mandibular region. The iris is red. The body is greenish laterally, with a mixture of orange and red at the abdominal area. The body is covered with round or oval black spots. The fins are bright red.

== Behaviour ==
This is a predatory fish. Consuming smaller fish and attacking fins, juveniles include aquatic insects and crustaceans (shrimps). Occasionally included fruits from the surrounding gallery forest. This is a solitary species, and is never seen in schools.

== Bibliography ==
- Fink, W.; A. Machado-Allison (1992). "Three new species of piranhas from Venezuela and Brazil". Ichthyological Explorations of Freshwaters. 2 (1): 57–71.
- Machado-Allison, A. & W. Fink. 1996. Los peces caribes de Venezuela: diagnosis, claves, espectos ecológicos y evolutivos. Universidad Central de Venezuela CDCH, (Colección Monografías) 52. 149p. ISBN 980-00-0967-1 Caracas, Venezuela.
