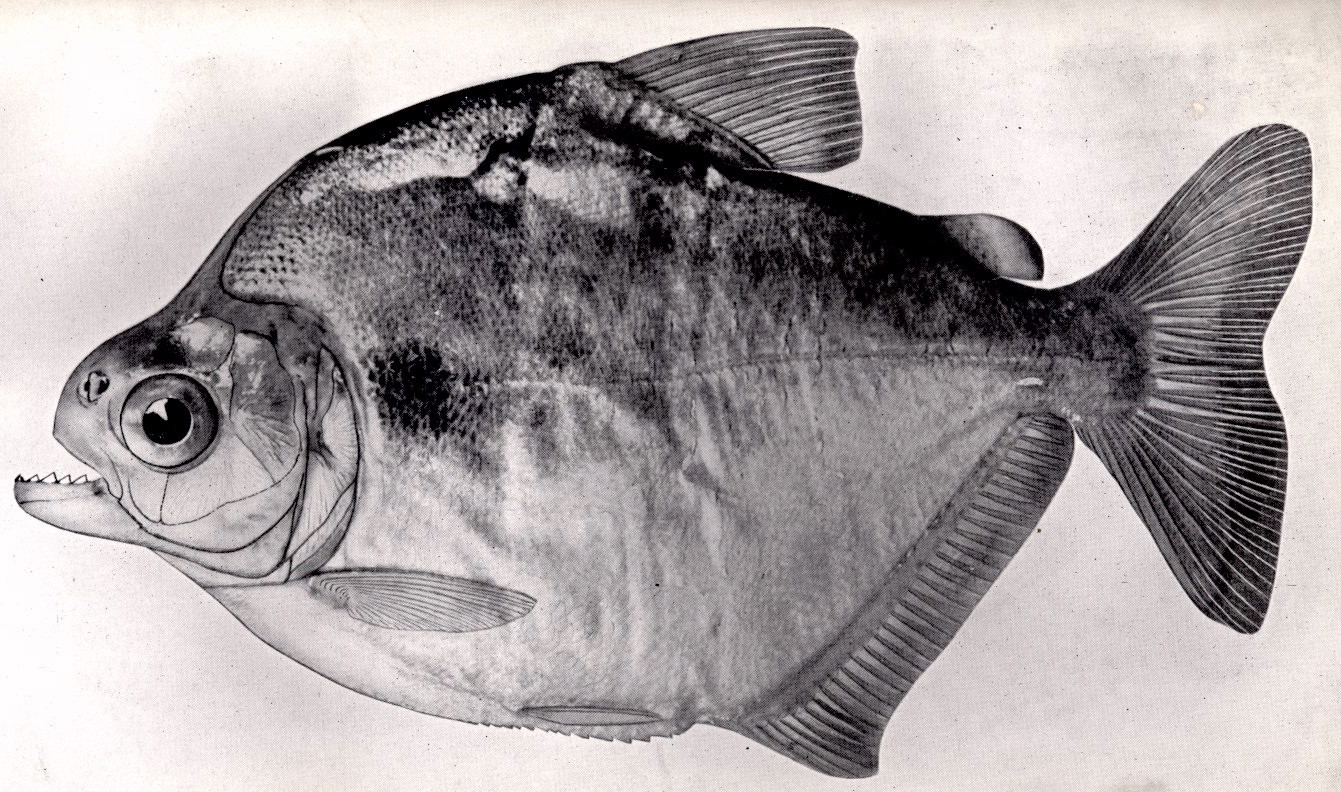

Conservation status
- Least Concern (IUCN 3.1)

Scientific classification
- Kingdom: Animalia
- Phylum: Chordata
- Class: Actinopterygii
- Order: Characiformes
- Family: Serrasalmidae
- Genus: Serrasalmus
- Species: S. calmoni

Binomial name
- Serrasalmus calmoni (Steindachner, 1908)

Synonyms
- Serrasalmo (Pygocentrus) calmoni Steindachner, 1908; Pristobrycon calmoni (Steindachner 1908); Pygocentrus bilineatus C. H. Eigenmann, 1909; Serrasalmus coccogenis Fowler, 1911; Pygopristis gibbosus Starks, 1913

= Serrasalmus calmoni =

Species of fish

Serrasalmus calmoni is a species of freshwater ray-finned fish belonging to the family Serrasalmidae, which includes the pacus, piranhas and related fishes. This fish is found in South America.

== Habitat ==
It is mostly found in black or acidic waters, and in the turbid waters of the tributaries and main channel of the middle and low Orinoco River.

== Description ==
This is a small fish. The body is discoid with the anterodorsal profile slightly curved in a "S" shape. The head is robust and wide. The snout is blunt. There is a preanal spine present. The adipose fin is wide. The head is silver with metallic orange to red at mandibular and opercular regions. The iris is yellow. The body is greenish laterally, with a mixture of orange and red at the abdominal area. The body is not covered with round or oval black spots. There is a single spot behind the opercular area above the pectoral fin. Fins are pale except the anal fins, which have the basal rays and membranes yellow or orange and the distal area black. The caudal fin has a terminal black band.

== Behaviour ==
This is a predatory fish which consumes smaller fish and attacks the fins of others. It eats juvenile fish, aquatic insects and crustaceans (shrimps). Its diet occasionally includes fruits from the surrounding gallery forest.

This is a solitary species and is never seen in schools.

== Comments ==
Some authors recognize two subspecies: S. c. calmoni for the Amazonas (Brazil), and S. c. bilineatus, which is found in Venezuela and Guianas. The holotype probably is lost.
