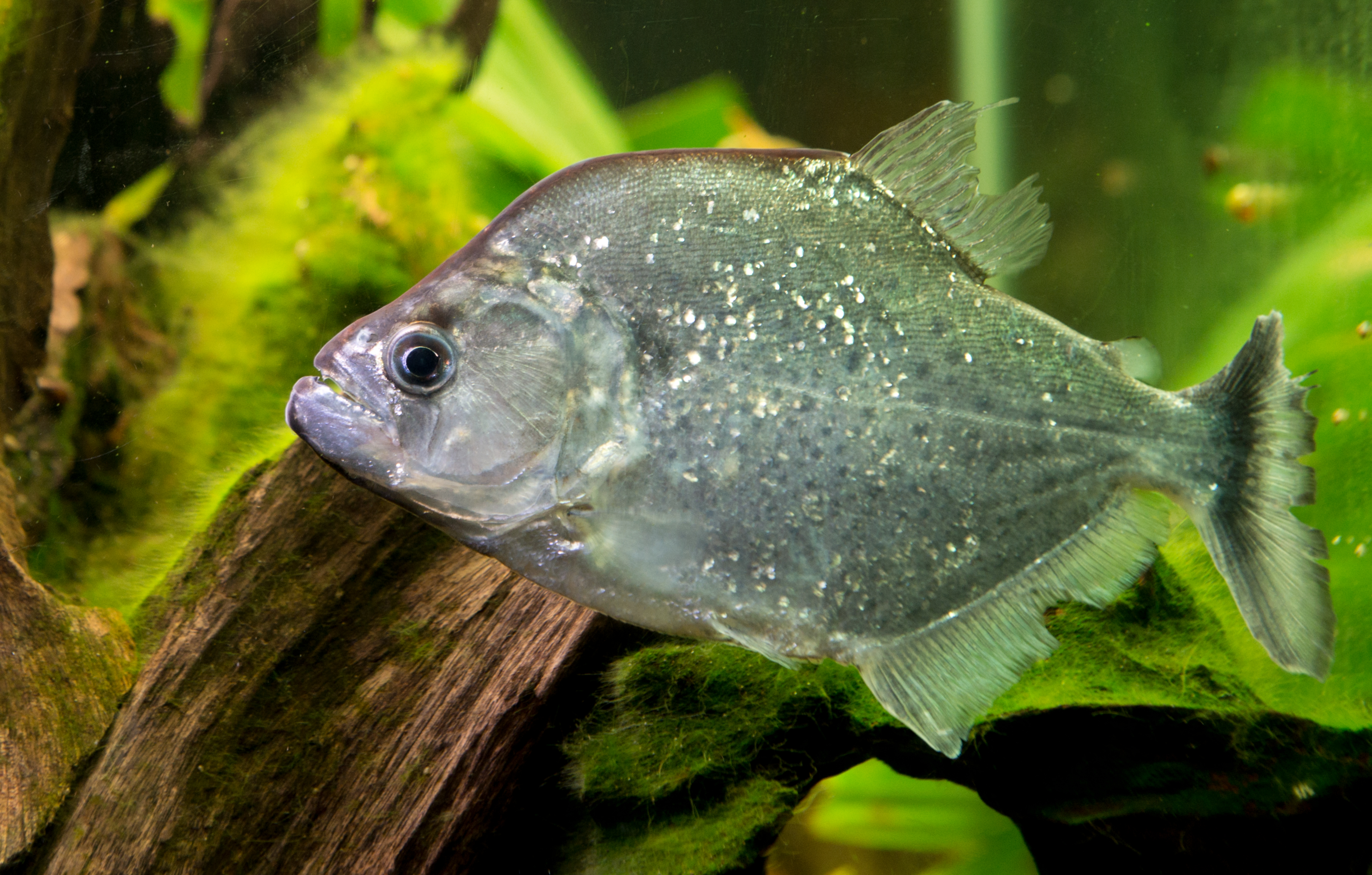

Conservation status
- Least Concern (IUCN 3.1)

Scientific classification
- Kingdom: Animalia
- Phylum: Chordata
- Class: Actinopterygii
- Order: Characiformes
- Family: Serrasalmidae
- Genus: Serrasalmus
- Species: S. geryi

Binomial name
- Serrasalmus geryi Jégu & dos Santos, 1988

= Serrasalmus geryi =

Species of fish

Serrasalmus geryi, known as the violet line piranha or Gery's piranha, is a species of freshwater ray-finned fish belonging to the family Serrasalmidae, which includes the pacus, piranhas and related fishes. It is found in the lower Tocantins and Araguaia Rivers of Brazil.

The species is notable for being one of only the members of the genus Serrasalmus that can coexist with others of the same species in captivity; however, caution is advised.

Gery's piranha reaches sizes up to 12 inches in length.

As of 2018, it is classified as Least Concern by the International Union for Conservation of Nature.

== Description ==
The body shape of Serrasalmus geryi is very laterally compressed, similar to other Serrasalmus genus members S. altuvei, S. hastatus, S. compressus and S. altispinis. The fish is distinctive at all ages, possessing a broad dark stripe running from the lower mouth to the top of the beginning of the dorsal fin. S. geryi does not exhibit sexual dimorphism.

The body is silver with numerous small spots on the flanks. The anal fin is hyaline with a broad black margin. The pectoral and ventral fins are clear. A humeral spot may be present. Eyes are silvery to reddish-orange.

Mature individuals reach a length of 25 cm (10 inches), with specimens rarely longer than 20 cm (8 inches) in captivity.
