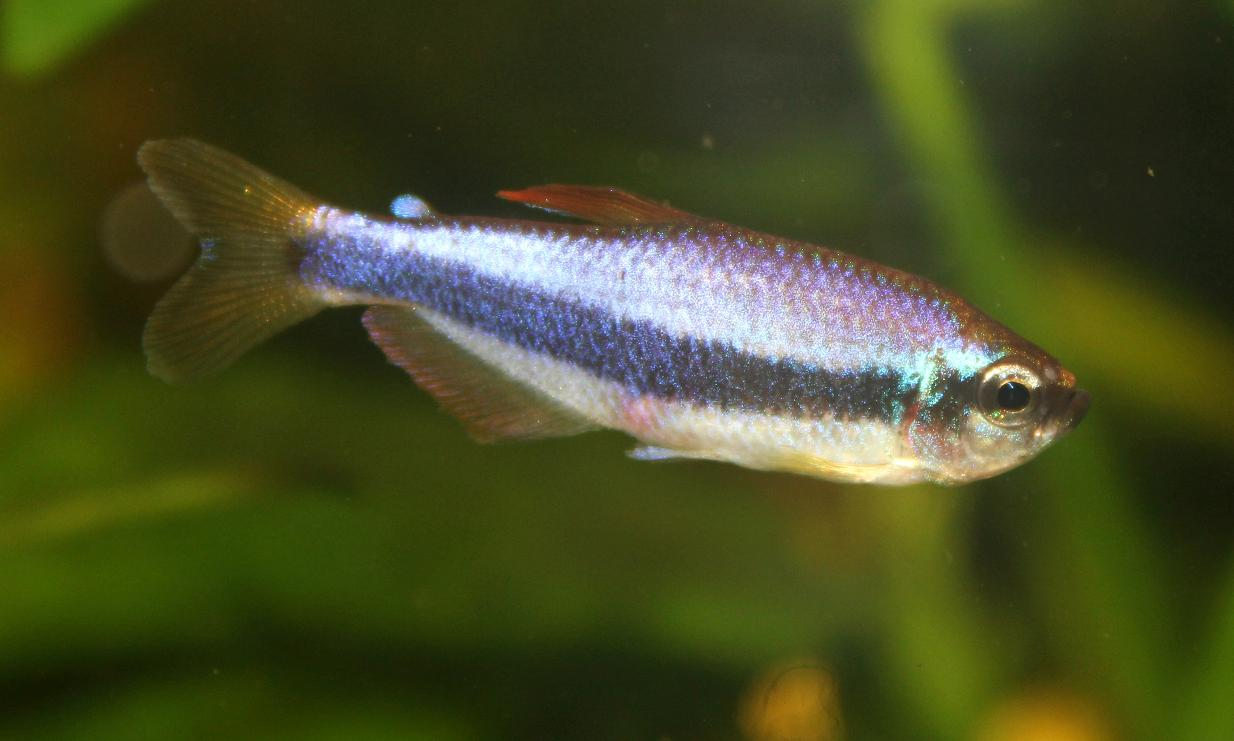
- Inpaichthys kerri

Scientific classification
- Kingdom: Animalia
- Phylum: Chordata
- Class: Actinopterygii
- Division: Teleostei
- Order: Characiformes
- Family: Acestrorhamphidae
- Subfamily: Thayeriinae
- Genus: Inpaichthys; Géry & Junk, 1977

Type species
- Inpaichthys kerri Géry & Junk, 1977

= Inpaichthys =

Genus of fishes

Inpaichthys is a genus of freshwater ray-finned fishes belonging to the family Acestrorhamphidae, the American characins. The fishes in this genus are found in South America. They are commonly seen in the aquarium trade.

== Species ==
Inpaichthys contains the following valid species:

- Inpaichthys kerri Géry & Junk, 1977 (Royal tetra)
- Inpaichthys luizae (Dagosta, 2025)
- Inpaichthys nambiquara (Bertaco & Malabarba, 2007)
- Inpaichthys parauapiranga Ferreira, Ribeiro, F. C. T. Lima, Silva, Ferreira & Mirande, 2024
