= William L. Fink =

American ichthyologist

William Lee Fink
- Born: July 22, 1946; Coleman, Texas, United States
- Known for: Fish systematics, phylogeny of piranhas, neotropical ichthyology
- Scientific career
- Fields: Ichthyology, Systematics, Biogeography

William Lee Fink (born July 22, 1946) is an American ichthyologist known for his contributions to the biology, systematics, and evolutionary history of fishes, particularly neotropical taxa.

== Life and education ==
Fink is the son of Fred William Fink and Anna L. Davis (née Cobb). He earned a Bachelor of Science degree from the University of Miami in 1967 and a Master of Science degree from Missouri Southern State University in 1969. From 1969 to 1971, he served in the United States Navy at the Naval Medical Research Institute in Bethesda, Maryland, remaining in the naval reserve until 1975. In 1976, he received his Ph.D. in biology from George Washington University.

== Academic career ==
From 1976 to 1980, Fink served as assistant curator and assistant professor at the Museum of Comparative Zoology at Harvard University. In 1980, he was promoted to associate professor of biology at the same institution. In 1982, he joined the faculty of the University of Michigan as a lecturer and assistant curator. He became associate professor and associate curator in 1987 and was promoted to full professor and curator in 1996. From 2005 to 2011, he served as director of the University of Michigan Museum of Zoology. Fink retired on May 31, 2014, as professor emeritus and curator.

== Research ==
Fink’s research focuses on the biology and systematics of fishes, with particular expertise in neotropical species, higher-level classification, systematic theory, and biogeography. He is especially known for his work on the phylogeny of piranhas, including studies on the evolution of growth patterns and trophic specializations, as well as the historical biogeography of the group. He has also investigated relationships within the Ostariophysi. His phylogenetic analyses emphasize non-traditional character systems, such as ontogenetic trajectories and morphometrics.

== Taxa described ==
Fink has described numerous fish species, including Sternopygus xingu, Fernaldella georgiana, Gambusia hispaniolae, Bryconamericus bayano, Moenkhausia phaeonota, Pristobrycon careospinus, Pristobrycon maculipinnis, Serrasalmus gouldingi, Serrasalmus hastatus, Odontostilbe dialeptura, Odontostilbe mitoptera, Serrasalmus neveriensis, Limia caymanensis, Nematobrycon lacortei, Xenurobrycon heterodon, Xenurobrycon pteropus, and Ptychocharax rhyacophila.

== Fieldwork ==
Fink has conducted research expeditions throughout the United States, the Bahamas, the Greater Antilles and Lesser Antilles, as well as in Brazil, Colombia, Venezuela, and Panama.

== Professional affiliations ==
Fink is a member of the American Society of Ichthyologists and Herpetologists, the Society for the Study of Evolution, the American Association for the Advancement of Science, Sigma Xi, the Sociedade Brasileira de Ictiologia, the Biological Society of Washington, and the Society of Systematic Biologists, serving as its president in 1990.

== Personal life ==
Fink married Sara V. Haase in 1972. The couple has one son.
