= Odontostilbe dialeptura =

Conservation status
- Near Threatened (IUCN 3.1)

Scientific classification
- Kingdom: Animalia
- Phylum: Chordata
- Class: Actinopterygii
- Division: Teleostei
- Order: Characiformes
- Family: Characidae
- Genus: Odontostilbe
- Species: O. dialeptura

Binomial name
- Odontostilbe dialeptura (Fink & Weitzman, 1974)

Synonyms
- Cheirodon dialepturus Fink & Weitzman, 1974; Compsura dialeptura (Fink & Weitzman, 1974)

Species of fish

Odontostilbe dialeptura is a species of fish in the family Characidae.

== Description ==
It has an elongate, compressed body. It has 32–34 vertebrae, and is of a pale brown colour with a bronze-green shading and some conspicuous black scales at the back.

== Distribution ==
This fish is found in Pacific drainages from Costa Rica to Panama and Colombia.

== See also ==
- Odontostilbe mitoptera
