= Odontostilbe mitoptera =

Conservation status
- Vulnerable (IUCN 3.1)

Scientific classification
- Kingdom: Animalia
- Phylum: Chordata
- Class: Actinopterygii
- Division: Teleostei
- Order: Characiformes
- Family: Characidae
- Genus: Odontostilbe
- Species: O. mitoptera

Binomial name
- Odontostilbe mitoptera Fink & Weitzman, 1974

Synonyms
- Cheirodon mitopterus Fink & Wietzmann, 1974

Species of fish

Odontostilbe mitoptera is a species of fish in the family Characidae.

== Description ==
It has an elongate, compressed body. It has 32–34 vertebrae and is of a shady green colour with bright silver shading on the sides.

== Distribution ==
This fish is found in central Panama.

== See also ==
- Odontostilbe dialeptura
