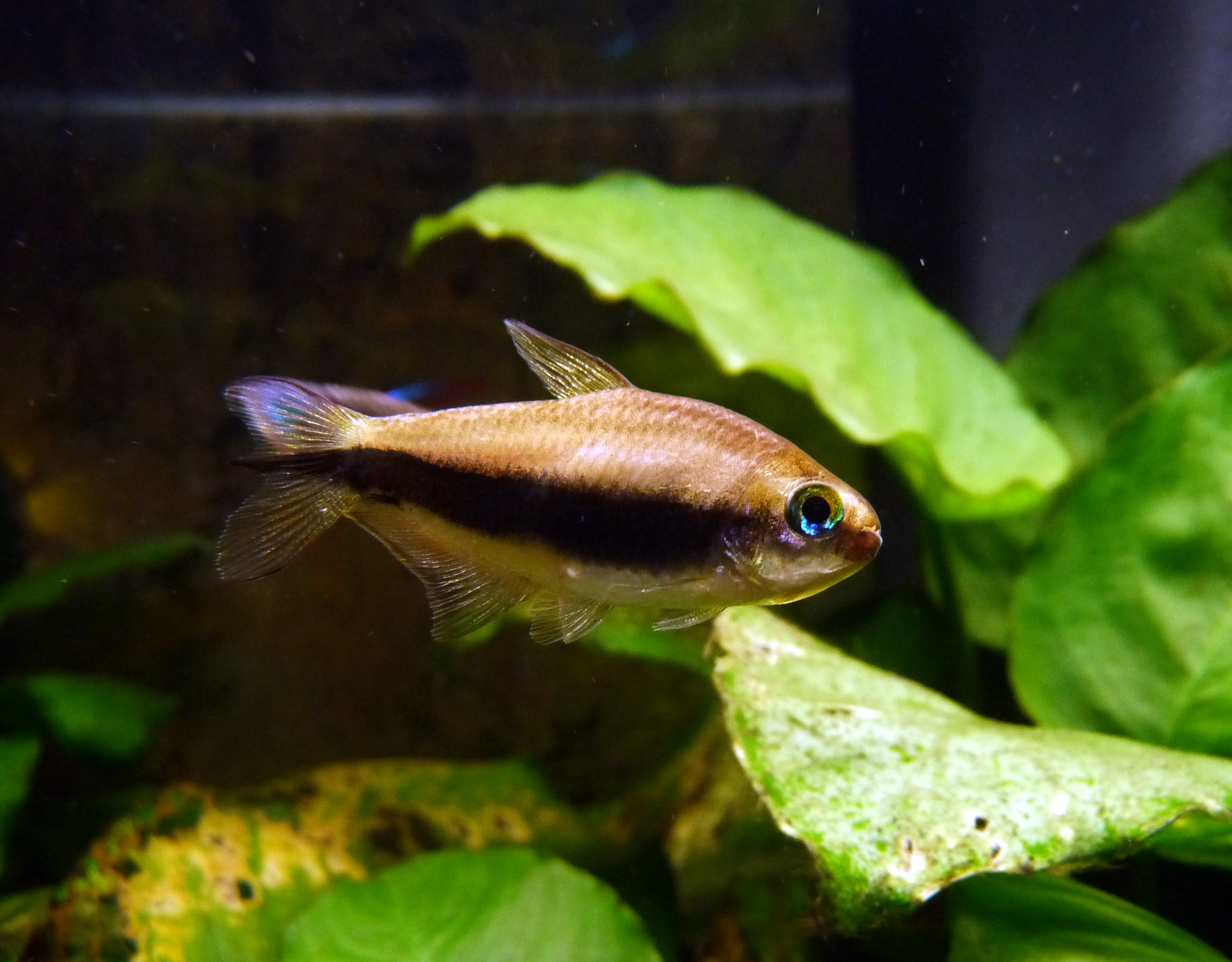
- A female

Conservation status
- Data Deficient (IUCN 3.1)

Scientific classification
- Kingdom: Animalia
- Phylum: Chordata
- Class: Actinopterygii
- Order: Characiformes
- Family: Acestrorhamphidae
- Genus: Nematobrycon
- Species: N. palmeri

Binomial name
- Nematobrycon palmeri C. H. Eigenmann, 1911

= Nematobrycon palmeri =

Species of fish

Nematobrycon palmeri, commonly known as the emperor tetra, is a species of freshwater ray-finned fish belonging to the family Acestrorhamphidae, the American tetras. This species is found in the Atrato and San Juan river basins in western Colombia. It was first imported in the aquarium trade to the United States in 1960 and has since become well established.

It is named in honor of Mervyn George Palmer (1882–1954), an English traveler who collected in Central and South America for the British Museum, and who collected the type specimen.

== Description ==
The purple hue of these tetras will be more apparent in an aquarium with floating plants on the surface and relatively subdued lighting. If the aquarium is too bright, the yellow coloration will dominate. The body is long, slim, and flattened to about 3 inches (76 mm) at maturity. Looking from the eye to the tail area, one will find a black line placed within a blue stripe. The sickle-shaped dorsal fin, along with the pectoral fin and anal fins, are yellow. The male is larger than the female, and his anal fins are longer. The male caudal is more pointed than the female.

Emperor tetras are highly sexually dimorphic, and thus males and females are quite easily distinguished from each other. There are several ways to tell a male and female apart; the most reliable method is to observe the eye color. Males have metallic blue eyes, while females have metallic green eyes. Also, the male has a three pronged tail, with the medial black stripe usually extending beyond the rest of the tail, while in the females this median black stripe will typically only reach as far as the clear part of the tail. However, this is not always the best indicator, as the third prong in males can sometimes be nipped off in competitions with tank mates, and more dominant females sometimes grow this extension of the tail as well.

This species should not be confused with the royal tetra Inpaichthys kerri, whose appearance and alternate common names resemble N. palmeri.

== Foods and feeding ==
The emperor tetra is an omnivore, eating both animal and vegetable food. Any good flake or pelleted fish food is a good basis for its diet. It will benefit from live food like daphnia and mosquito larvae, as well as frozen fish food, including frozen bloodworms.

== Breeding ==
In a large well planted aquarium, a single pair of emperor tetras will often breed without any extra stimulation. If there are no other fish, some young may survive, especially if the parents are well fed. In a large, well planted aquarium, the young will find some useful natural food in the form of protozoa, algae, etc. Screened daphnia will provide them with more nourishment as they grow, and dry fry food can be used.

== In the aquarium ==
The emperor tetra is a placid aquarium fish and will be disturbed by more boisterous species. It grows to 4.2 cm (1.7 in). It prefers a pH of 6.5, a hardness of 3–6 dKH and a temperature of 23–27 °C (73–81 °F).

It does not school as readily as most tetras, and a pair appears happier than with most tetras. However, with the addition of fresh cool water, a large group of emperors will school across an aquarium, sometimes for several minutes.

== Gallery ==
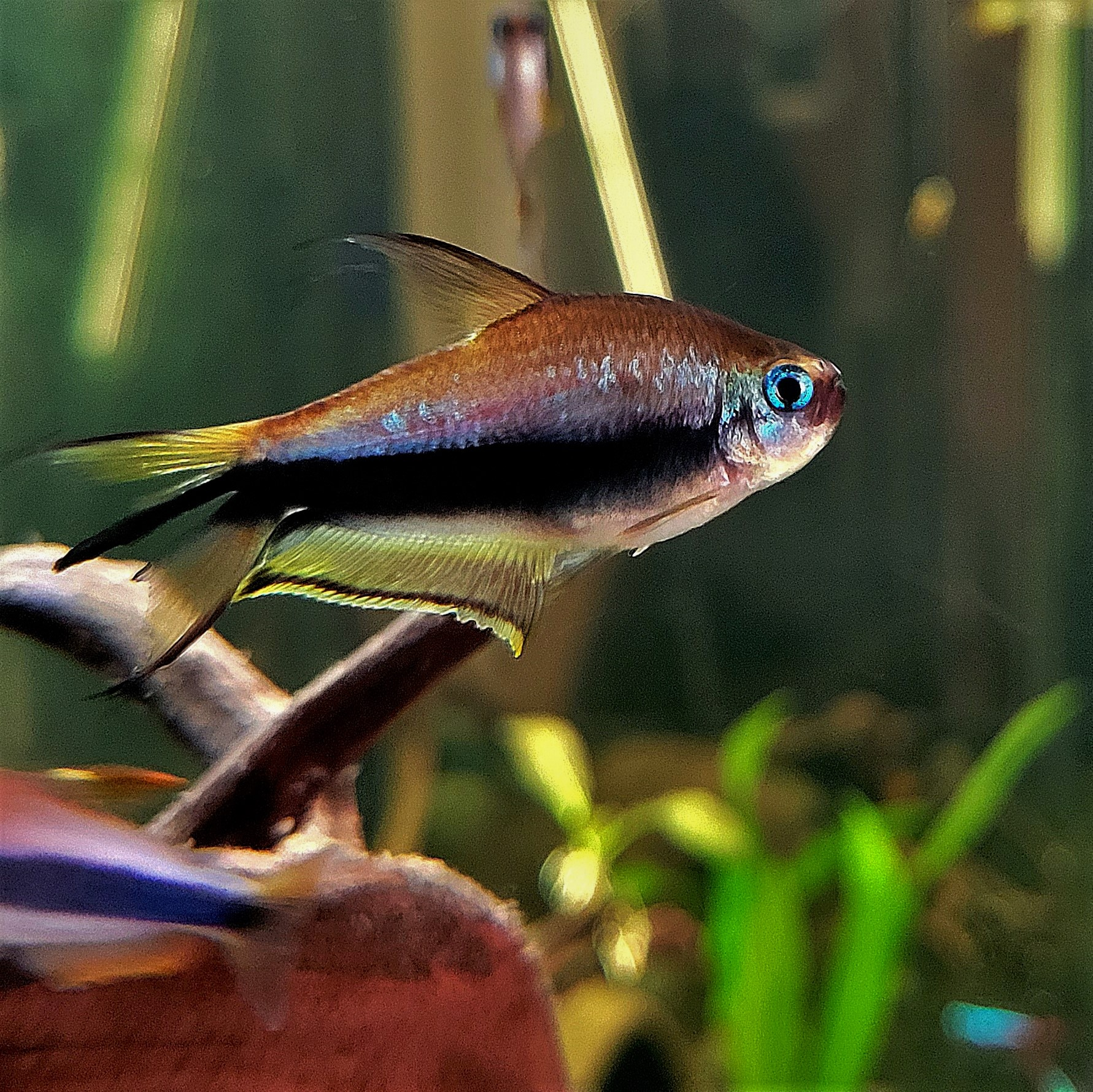

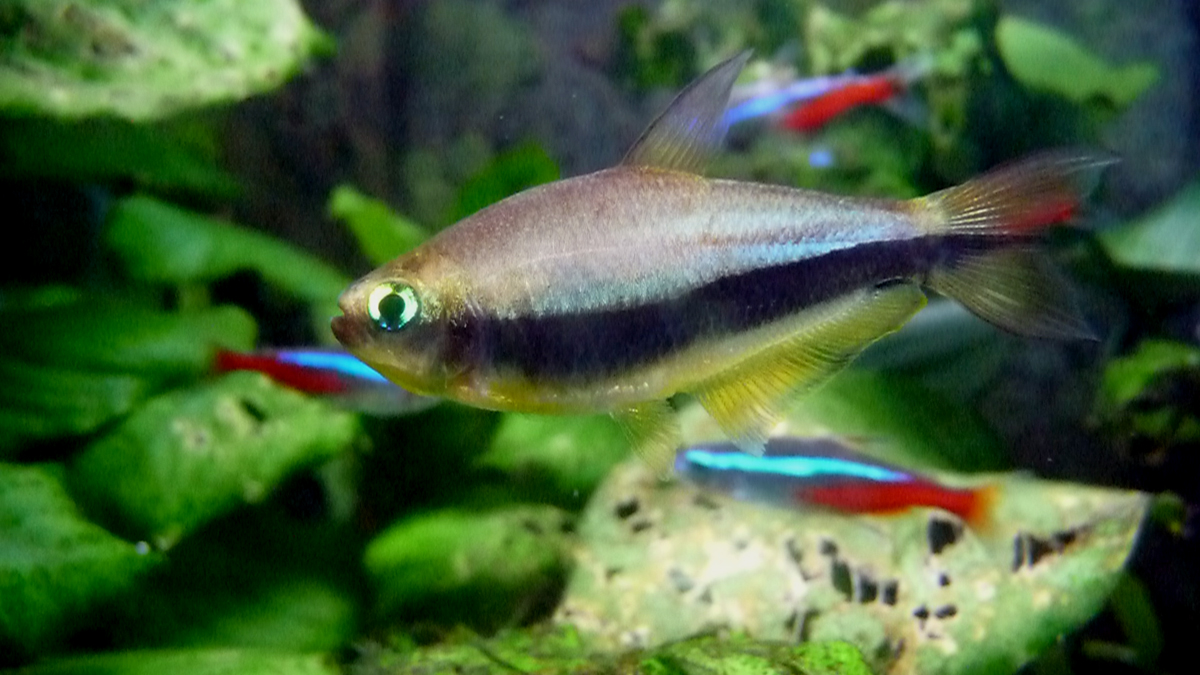

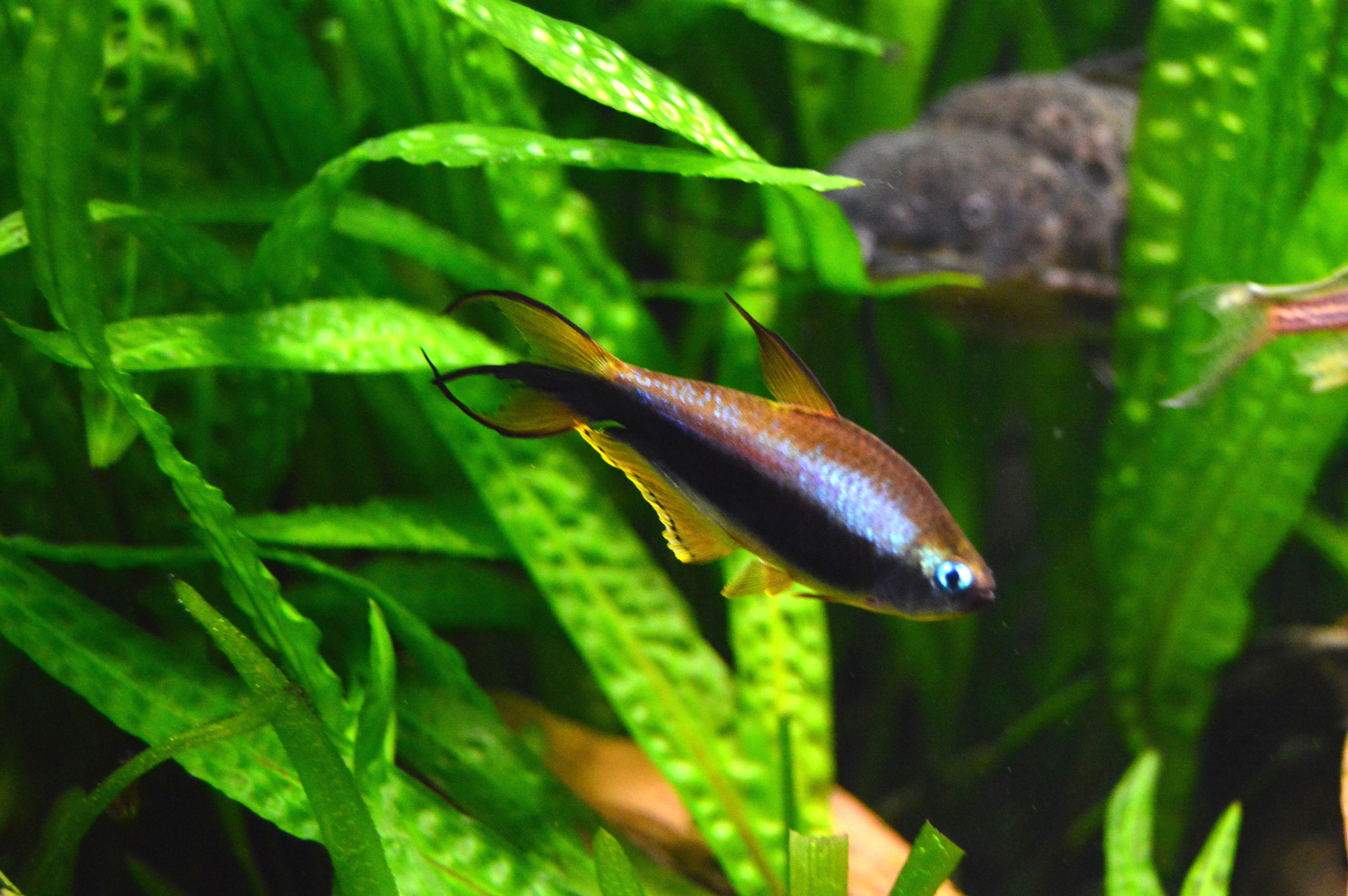

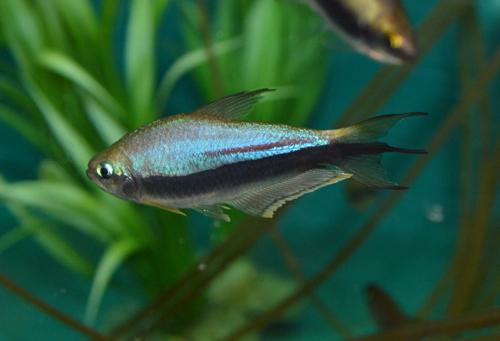

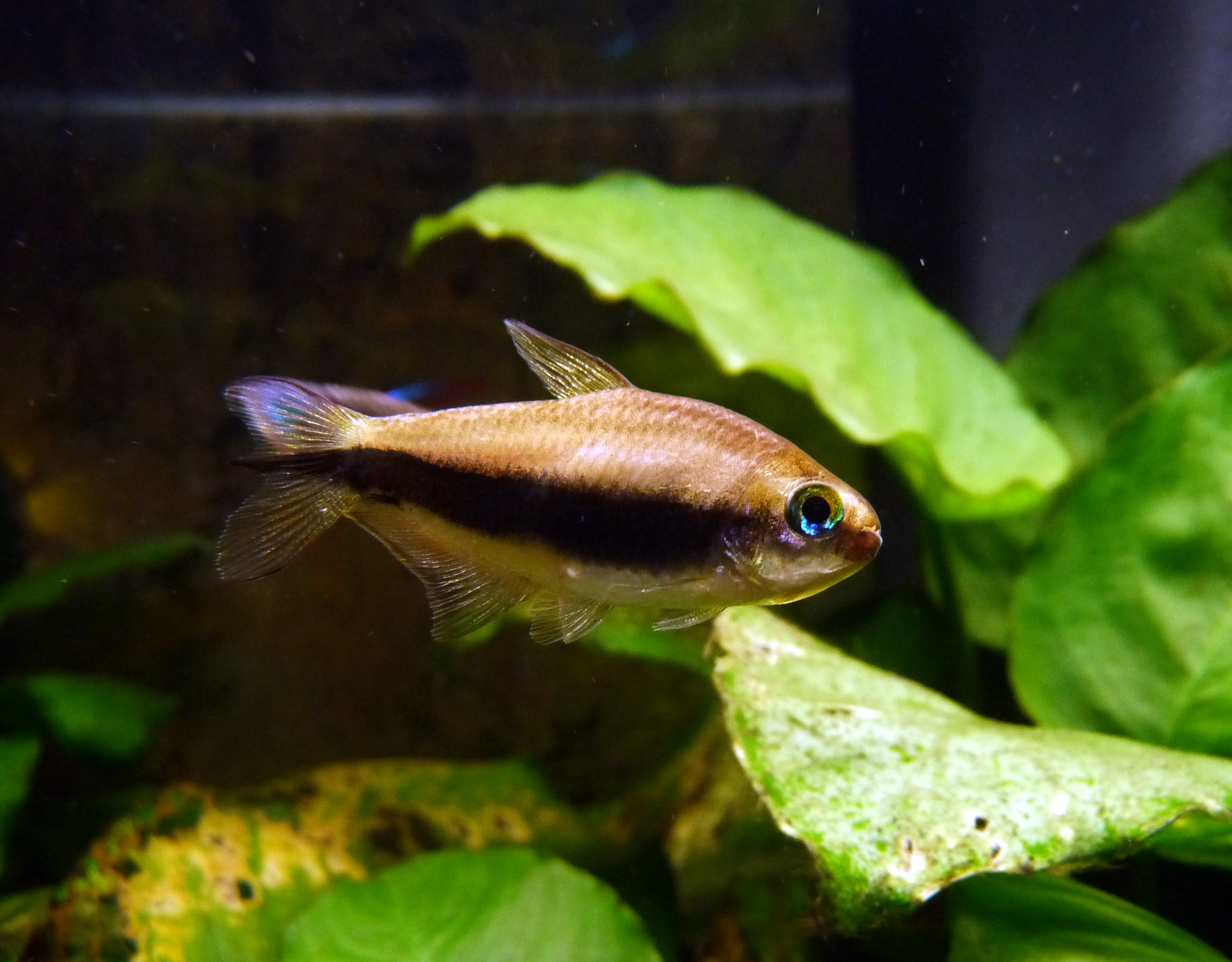

== See also ==
- List of freshwater aquarium fish species
