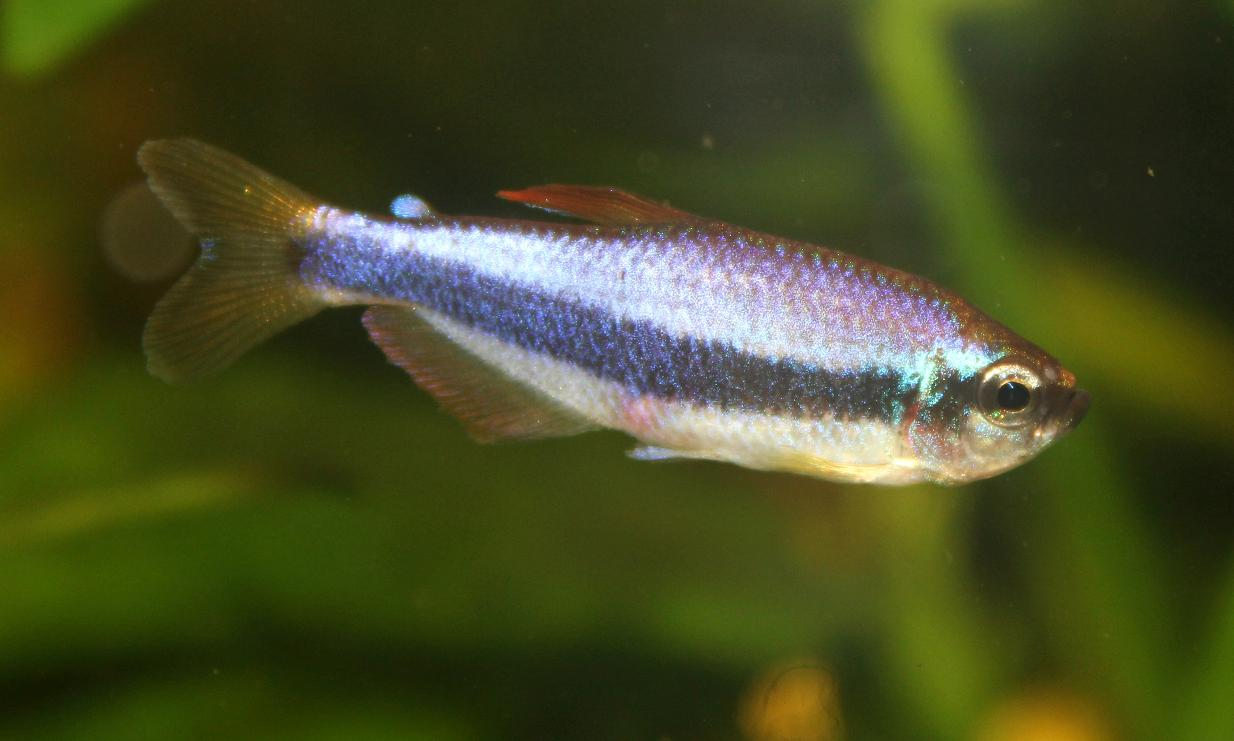
- Male

Conservation status
- Least Concern (IUCN 3.1)

Scientific classification
- Kingdom: Animalia
- Phylum: Chordata
- Class: Actinopterygii
- Order: Characiformes
- Family: Acestrorhamphidae
- Subfamily: Thayeriinae
- Genus: Inpaichthys
- Species: I. kerri

Binomial name
- Inpaichthys kerri Géry & Junk, 1977

= Royal tetra =

Species of fish

The royal tetra (Inpaichthys kerri) is a species of freshwater ray-finned fish belonging to the family Acestrorhamphidae, the American characins. This fish is endemic to Brazil, where it is found in tributaries of the Aripuanã River. It was once the sole member of its genus.

The fish was named in honor of Warwick Estevam Kerr (1922–2018), a Brazilian agricultural engineer, geneticist, entomologist, and director of Instituto Nacional de Pesquisas da Amazônia, whose field station in Núcleo Aripuanã, Mato Grosso, Brazil, is near the area where the specimen was discovered.

== Ecology ==
Inpaichthys kerri was discovered in sunny and moving waters of the forested Queimados River system, a tributary of the Aripuanã River. In its natural habitat it lives in very soft and slightly acidic waters with a pH between 6.0 and 6.8. I. kerri is an active and bold species, and has been found schooling with another undescribed species (similar to Hyphessobrycon cachimbensis). It is generally less abundant than the latter, in the ratio 1/200 or less, although it can be quite abundant in some spots. It feeds mainly on insects that fall on the water surface.

== In captivity ==
It is kept as an aquarium fish, where it is sold under the additional common names blue emperor tetra, purple emperor tetra, black emperor tetra, or regal tetra (not to be confused with Nematobrycon palmeri with similar appearance and common names). I. kerri requires similar-sized schooling fish that are not overly aggressive, as this species is prone to diseases when stressed in captivity.
