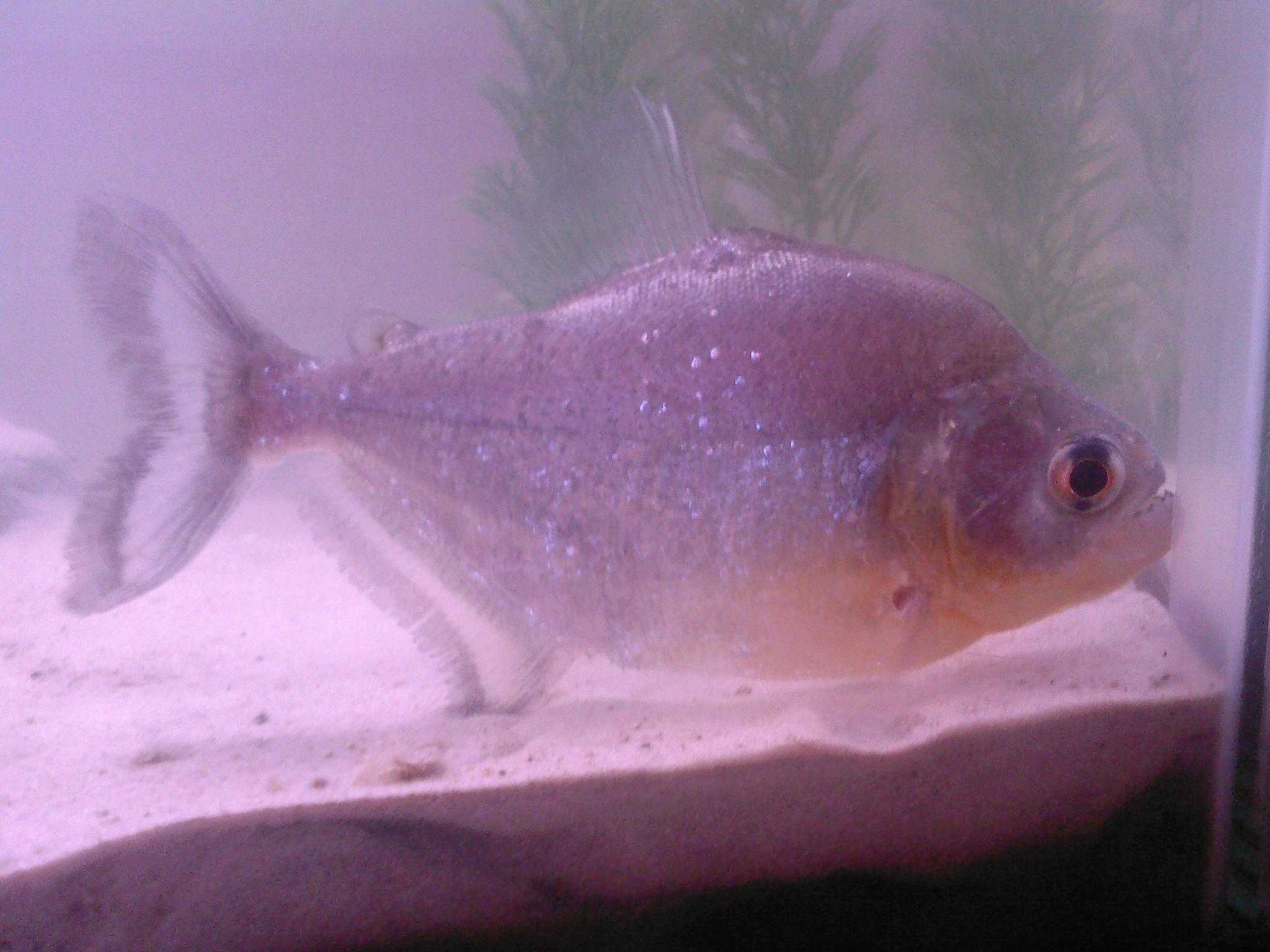

Conservation status
- Least Concern (IUCN 3.1)

Scientific classification
- Kingdom: Animalia
- Phylum: Chordata
- Class: Actinopterygii
- Division: Teleostei
- Order: Characiformes
- Family: Serrasalmidae
- Genus: Serrasalmus
- Species: S. sanchezi

Binomial name
- Serrasalmus sanchezi Géry, 1964

= Sharp-snouted piranha =

Species of fish

The sharp-snouted piranha (Serrasalmus sanchezi) is a species of freshwater ray-finned fish belonging to the family Serrasalmidae, which includes the pacus, piranhas and related fishes. This species is endemic to Peru. It is part of the S. rhombeus complex. It reaches a maximum size of around 7 inches (18 cm). Individuals often exhibit a red throat, similar to that of Pygocentrus nattereri. It is also known as ruby-throated diamond piranha or "ruby-red piranha"; the latter name is also used for the speckled piranha (S. spilopleura).
