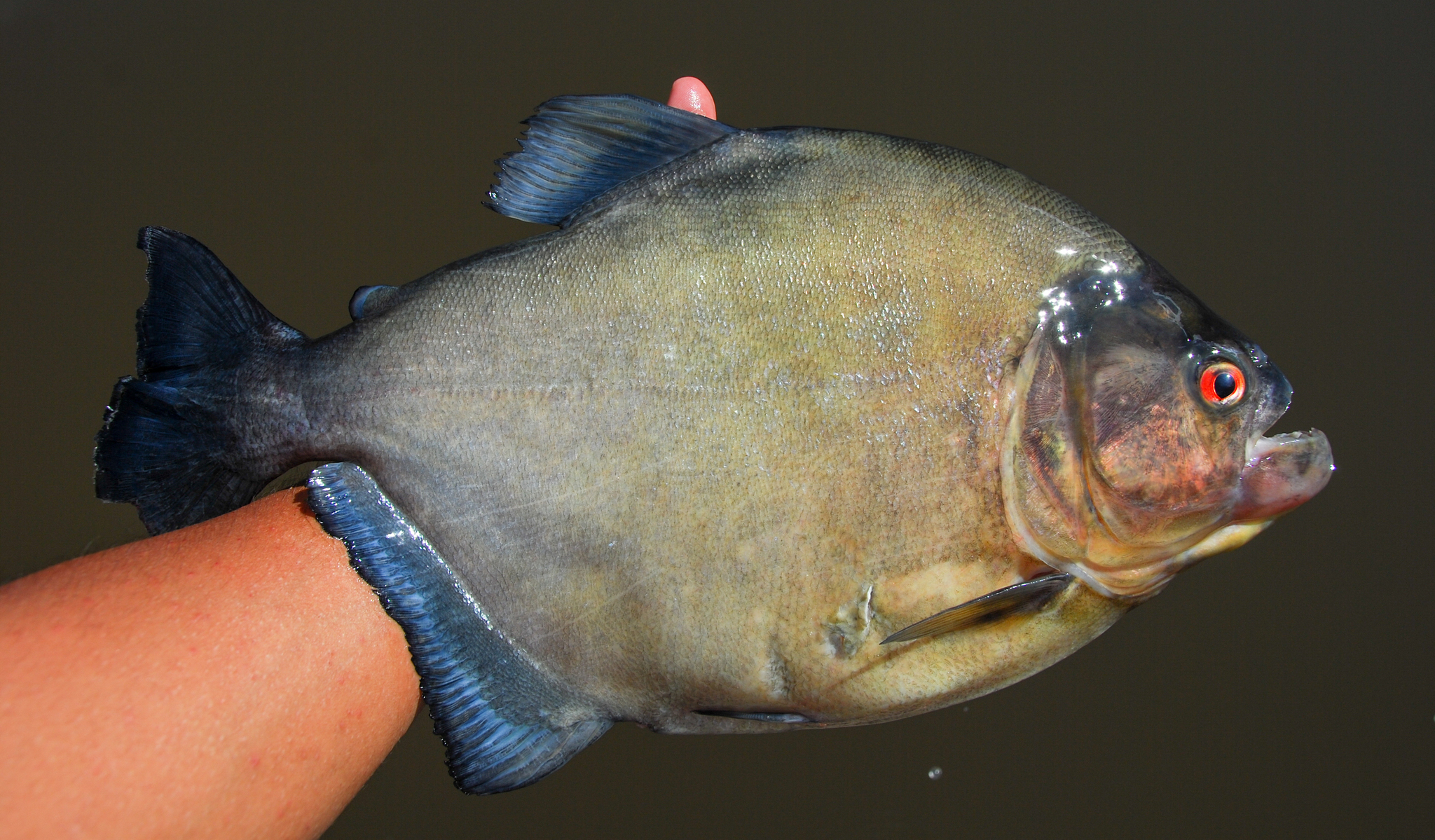
- S. rhombeus at Carauari, Brazil

Scientific classification
- Kingdom: Animalia
- Phylum: Chordata
- Class: Actinopterygii
- Division: Teleostei
- Order: Characiformes
- Family: Serrasalmidae
- Subfamily: Serrasalminae
- Genus: Serrasalmus; Lacépède, 1803

Type species
- Salmo rhombeus Linnaeus, 1766

Species
- See text

Synonyms
- Serrasalmo Duméril, 1805; Pristobrycon C. H. Eigenmann, 1915

= Serrasalmus =

Serrasalmus Temporal range: Middle Miocene–present

Genus of fishes

Serrasalmus is a genus of freshwater ray-finned fishes belonging to the family Serrasalmidae, which includes the pacus, piranhas and related fishes. They are collectively known as pirambebas; the "typical" piranhas like the piraya piranha are nowadays placed in Pygocentrus. Like all piranhas, Serrasalmus are native to South America.

One species, S. humeralis, was able to temporarily establish a breeding population in Florida before being eradicated in 1981.

== Description ==
Serrasalmus species have sharp teeth and generally have a compressed rhomboid shape. In some, the shape is more ovoid, particularly in old specimens. There is also a high variation in color patterns found within this genus. Some Serrasalmus species can exceed 20 in or 510 mm (S. manueli and S. rhombeus, according to OPEFE), placing them among the largest Serrasalmidae.

== Diet ==
Serrasalmus species are primarily piscivorous, with varying degrees of propensity for omnivory depending on the species. Plant material ingested may include fruits and seeds.

== Evolution ==
Pericentric inversions are likely responsible for many of the chromosomal differences in Serrasalmus.

== Fossil record ==
Middle Miocene-aged fossil tooth remains of a serrasalmid potentially referable to Serrasalmus are known from the Pebas Formation of Peru. The genus otherwise does not have a fossil record.

== Species ==
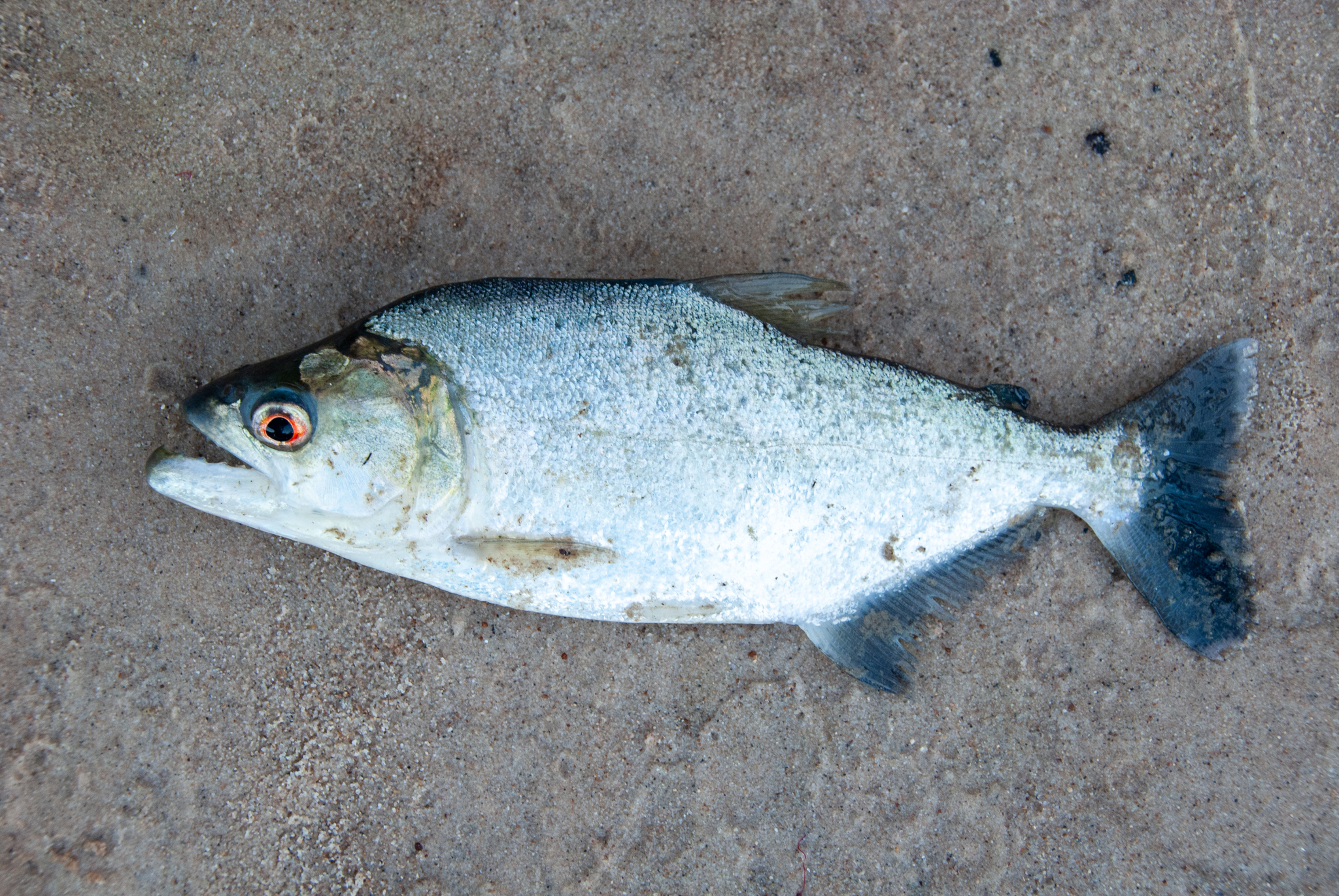
Serrasalmus elongatus

These are the recognized species in this genus:

- Serrasalmus altispinis Merckx, Jégu & dos Santos, 2000
- Serrasalmus altuvei Ramírez, 1965 (caribe pinche)
- Serrasalmus aureus (Spix & Agassiz, 1829)
- Serrasalmus brandtii Lütken, 1875 (white piranha)
- Serrasalmus calmoni (Steindachner, 1908)
- Serrasalmus careospinus W. L. Fink & Machado-Allison, 1992
- Serrasalmus castellonae Gallo-Cardozo, Careaga & Carvajal-Vallejos, 2025
- Serrasalmus compressus Jégu, Leão & dos Santos, 1991
- Serrasalmus eigenmanni Norman, 1929
- Serrasalmus elongatus Kner, 1858 (slender piranha, caribe pinche)
- Serrasalmus emarginatus (Jardine, 1841)
- Serrasalmus geryi Jégu & dos Santos, 1988 (violet line piranha)
- Serrasalmus gibbus Castelnau, 1855
- Serrasalmus gouldingi W. L. Fink & Machado-Allison, 1992 (blue tiger piranha)
- Serrasalmus hastatus W. L. Fink & Machado-Allison, 2001
- Serrasalmus hollandi (C. H. Eigenmann, 1915)
- Serrasalmus humeralis Valenciennes, 1850 (pirambeba)
- Serrasalmus irritans (W. K. H. Peters, 1877) (Iridescent piranha，"caribe pinche")
- Serrasalmus maculatus Kner, 1858 (spotted piranha)
- Serrasalmus maculipinnis W. L. Fink & Machado-Allison, 1992
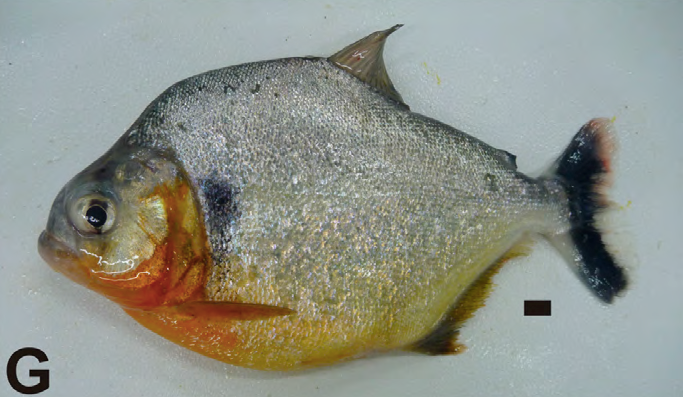
- S. eigenmanni, scale bar = 1 cm
  Serrasalmus manueli (Fernández-Yépez & Ramírez, 1967) (green tiger piranha, caribe parguasero)
- Serrasalmus magallanesi Gallo-Cardozo, Maldonado, Careaga & Carvajal-Vallejos, 2024
- Serrasalmus marginatus Valenciennes, 1837
- Serrasalmus medinai Ramírez, 1965 (red-throated piranha)
- Serrasalmus nalseni Fernández-Yépez, 1969 (caribe pintado)
- Serrasalmus neveriensis Machado-Allison, W. L. Fink, López Rojas & Rodenas, 1993
- Serrasalmus odyssei Hubert & Renno, 2010
- Serrasalmus rhombeus (Linnaeus, 1766) (redeye piranha, caribe amarillo)
- Serrasalmus sanchezi Géry, 1964 (sharp-snouted piranha)
- Serrasalmus scapularis Günther, 1864
- Serrasalmus serrulatus (Valenciennes, 1850) (caribe cortador)
- Serrasalmus spilopleura Kner, 1858 (speckled piranha)
