= Serrasalmus maculipinnis =

Conservation status
- Least Concern (IUCN 3.1)

Scientific classification
- Kingdom: Animalia
- Phylum: Chordata
- Class: Actinopterygii
- Division: Teleostei
- Order: Characiformes
- Family: Serrasalmidae
- Genus: Serrasalmus
- Species: S. maculipinnis

Binomial name
- Serrasalmus maculipinnis (W. L. Fink & Machado-Allison, 1992)

Synonyms
- Pristobrycon maculipinnis Fink & Machado-Allison, 1992

Species of fish

Serrasalmus maculipinnis, sometimes known as the marbled piranha, is a species of freshwater ray-finned fish belonging to the family Serrasalmidae, which includes the pacus, piranhas and related fishes. This fish is endemic to Venezuela.

== Habitat ==
S. maculipinnis mainly inhabits black or clear acidic waters in the Orinoco basin in the state of Amazonas in Venezuela. Its type locality is a tributary of the Pamoni River in the Casiquiare River Basin, although it can also be found in the Atabapo River basin.

== Description ==
The body of S. maculipinnis is discoid to oval with the anterodorsal slightly convex. It has a robust and wide head with a blunt snout. Preanal spines and ectopterygoid teeth are not found on this species. It has a wide adipose fin. The head of the species is dark in color in adults with the mandibular and opercular areas dark red. The iris of the species is golden yellow with a dark transversal band.

The body of S. maculipinnis is a metallic greyish color adorned with many dark spots, giving the species a marbled appearance, although the abdominal area can be dark red or orange in color. The fins of the species are generally red or orange in color and may also display dark spots. The adipose fin of the species is dark with several spots.

S. maculipinnis reaches 9.8 inches (24.9 cm) in standard length.

== Behaviour ==
It is a predatory fish that consumes smaller fish and attacks fins, although the diet of juveniles includes aquatic insects and crustaceans such as shrimps. It is also known to eat fruit originating from the surrounding gallery forest. It is a solitary species that is typically not seen in schools.
