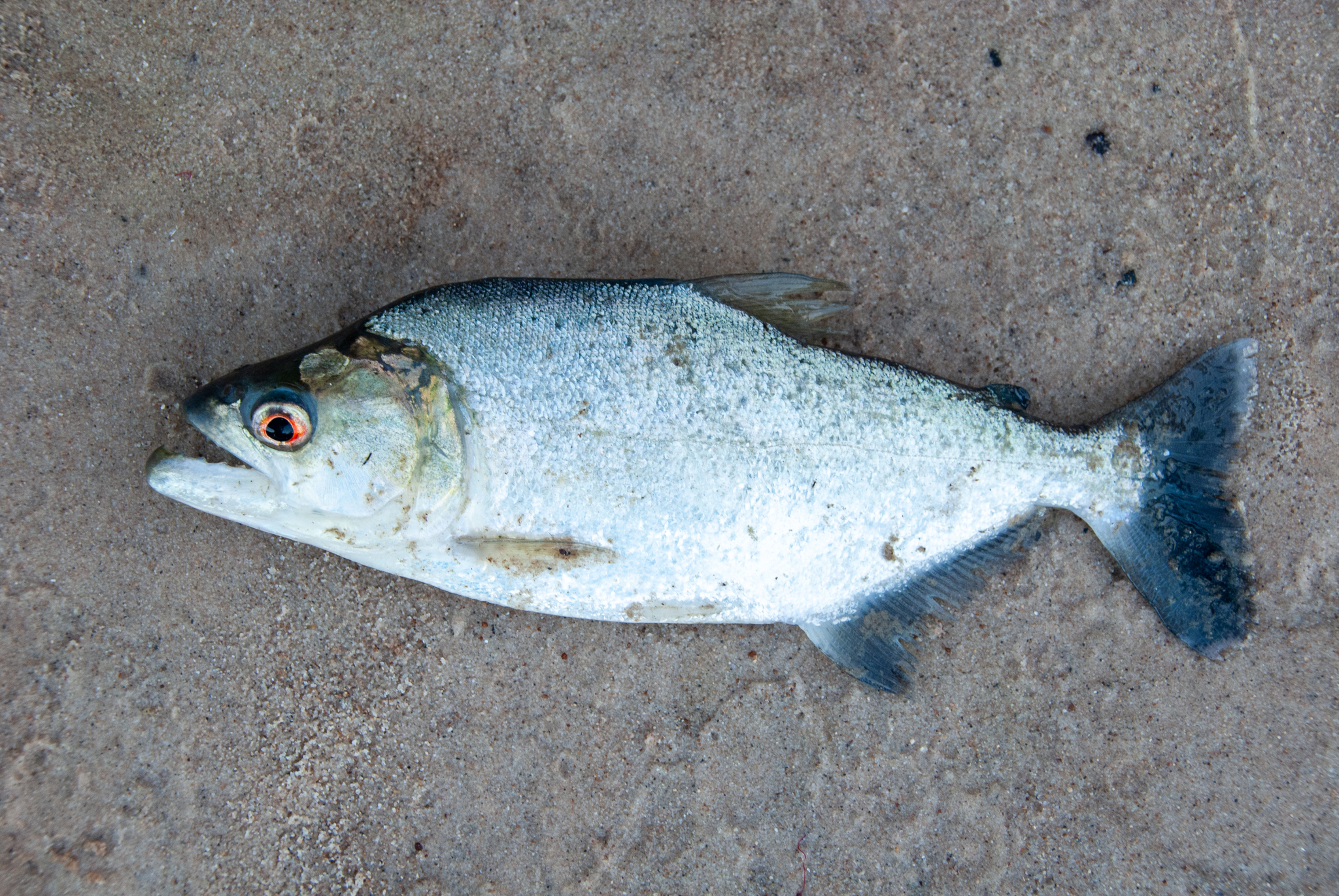

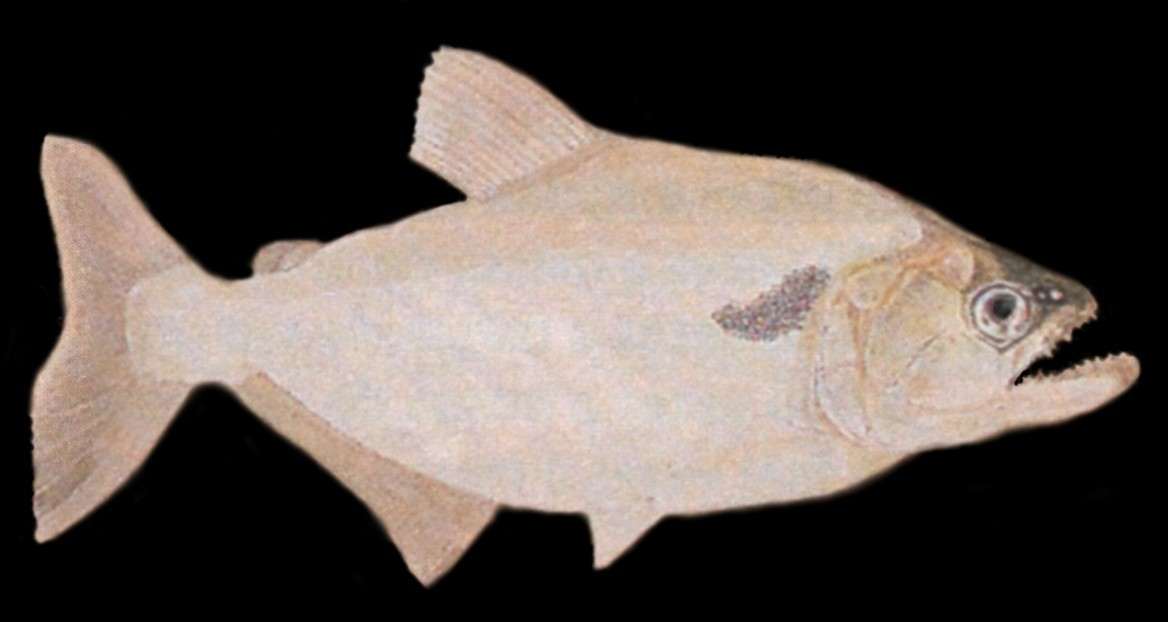

Conservation status
- Least Concern (IUCN 3.1)

Scientific classification
- Kingdom: Animalia
- Phylum: Chordata
- Class: Actinopterygii
- Order: Characiformes
- Family: Serrasalmidae
- Genus: Serrasalmus
- Species: S. elongatus

Binomial name
- Serrasalmus elongatus Kner, 1858

Synonyms
- Serrasalmus pingke Fernández-Yépez, 1951

= Serrasalmus elongatus =

Species of fish

Serrasalmus elongatus is a species of freshwater ray-finned fish belonging to the family Serrasalmidae, which includes the pacus, piranhas and related fishes. This slender and elongated shaped piranha from the S. humeralis group. It is commonly known as elongated piranha or pike piranha, in reference to its shape. In its native range it is one of the smaller piranha species locally called the caribe pinche ("mediocre piranha"), like the iridescent piranha (S. irritans). This term gave rise to various trade names, like Pingke piranha and Serrasalmus pinke.

Adult S. elongatus are found in deep, white water, and juveniles are in usually shallow black waters of lagoons.

== In the aquarium ==
Serrasalmus elongatus are notorious fin biters and should be kept in their own tank. They are illegal to keep in Alabama and many other US states.
