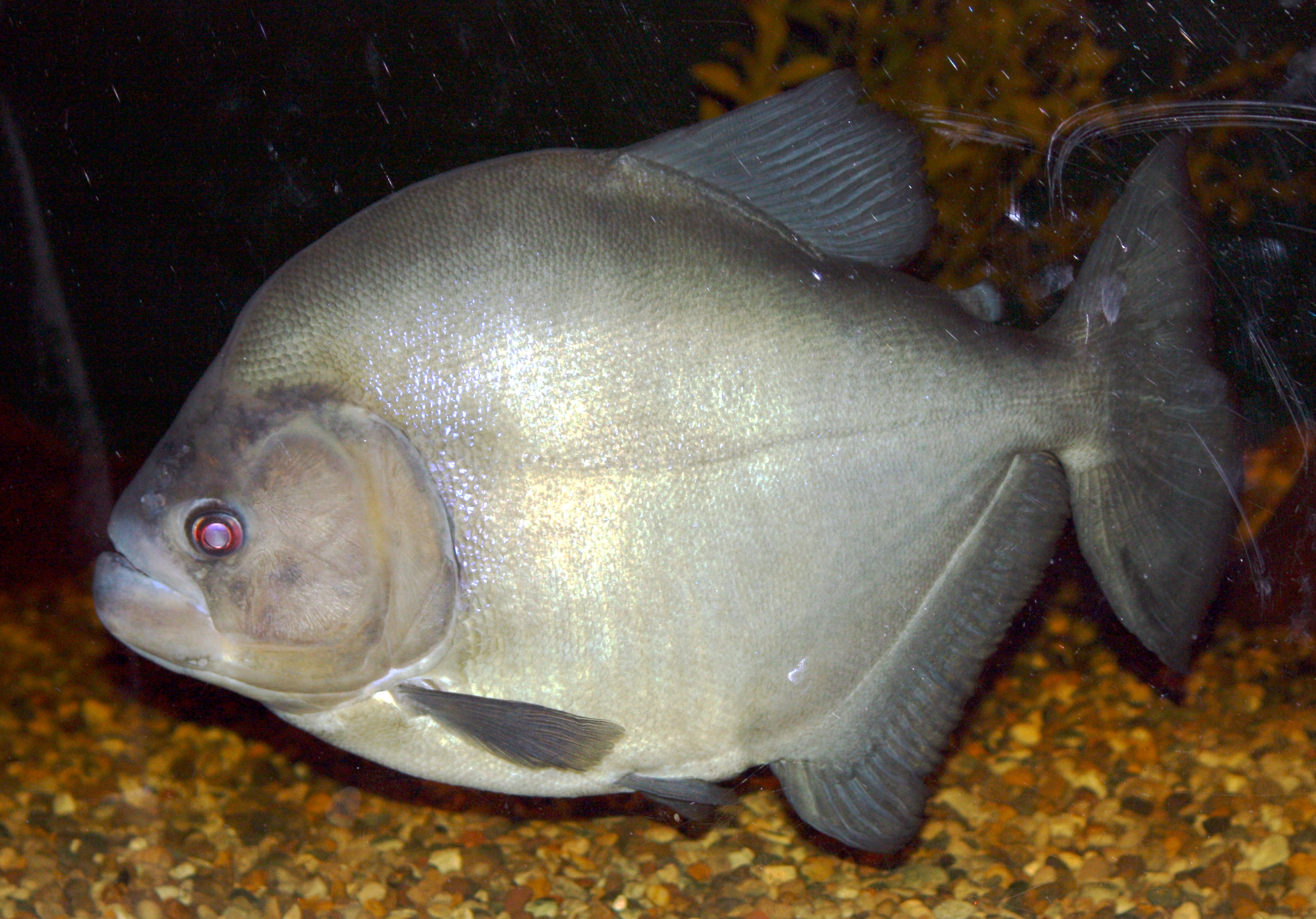
- At Louisville Zoo

Conservation status
- Least Concern (IUCN 3.1)

Scientific classification
- Kingdom: Animalia
- Phylum: Chordata
- Class: Actinopterygii
- Division: Teleostei
- Order: Characiformes
- Family: Serrasalmidae
- Genus: Serrasalmus
- Species: S. rhombeus

Binomial name
- Serrasalmus rhombeus (Linnaeus, 1766)

Synonyms
- Salmo rhombeus Linnaeus [C.] 1766; Serrasalmus niger Jardine, 1841; Serrasalmo immaculatus Cope, 1878; Serrasalmo humeralis var. gracilior C. H. Eigenmann, 1915; Serrasalmus boekeri Ahl, 1931; Serrasalmus (Taddyella) normani Géry, 1964

= Redeye piranha =

Species of fish

The redeye piranha (Serrasalmus rhombeus), also known as the black piranha, white piranha, spotted piranha or yellow piranha, is a species of freshwater ray-finned fish belonging to the family Serrasalmidae, which includes the pacus, piranhas and related fishes. It is found in northern South America. It is the type species of the genus Serrasalmus.

== Taxonomy ==
The redeye piranha was first formally described in 1766 as Salmo rhombeus, with the type locality given as Brokopondo on the Suriname River in Surinam. When Bernard Germain de Lacépède created the genus Serrasalmus in 1803, the only species he placed in it was Salmo rhombeus, so this species is the type species of its genus. The morphological differences between populations suggest that S. rhombeus is a species complex, but molecular work to confirm this has yet to be undertaken.

== Distribution ==
The redeye piranha is found in northern South America, east of the Andes. They are found in the drainage systems of the Amazon and Orinoco, as well as the Essequibo River and other rivers of the Guiana Shield and the coastal rivers of northeastern Brazil. It has been introduced to Florida, but is now extirpated.

== Description ==
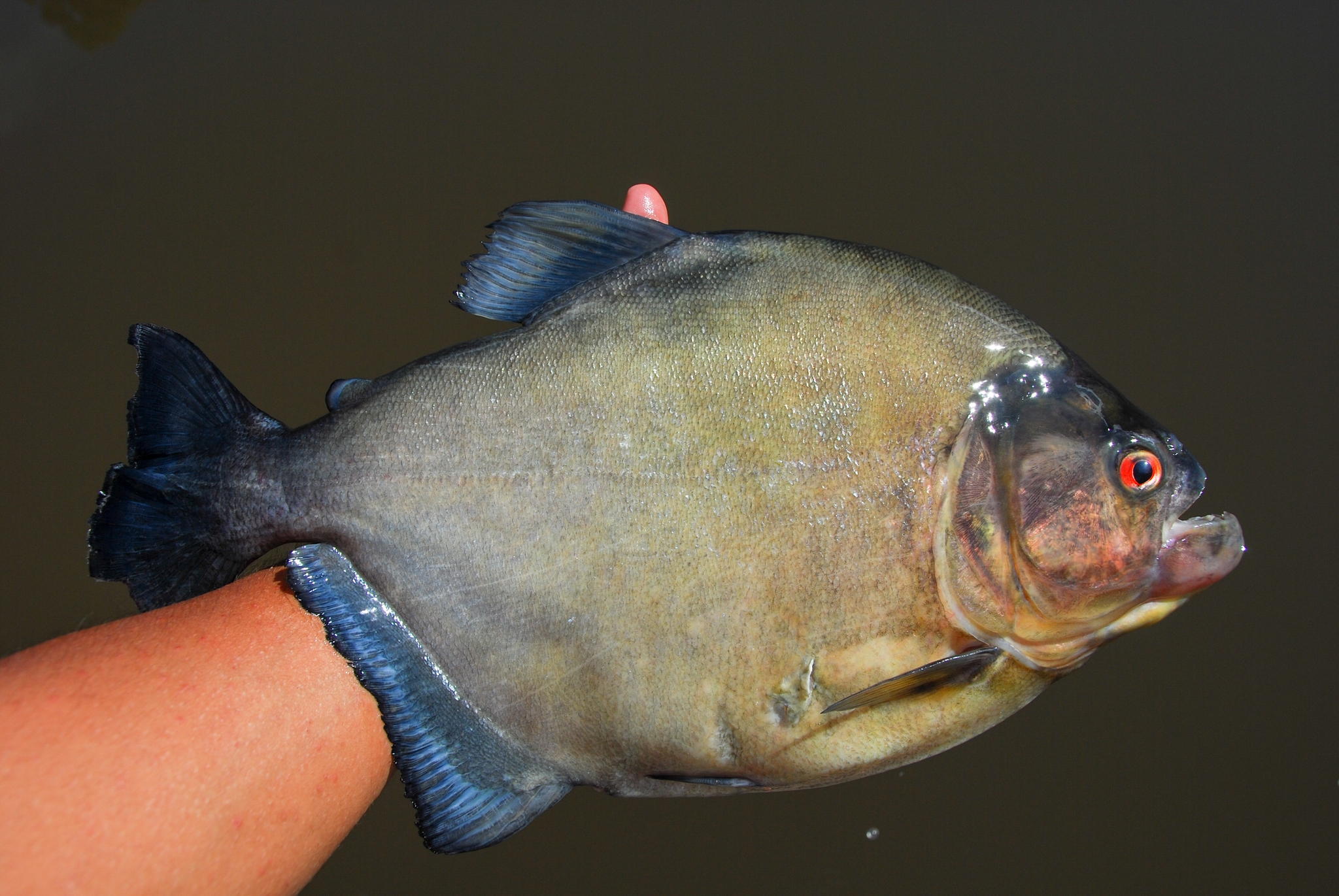
In Brazil

The redeye piranha is the largest species of piranha. It has a distinctively rhombus-shaped body, solidly coloured from grey through to nearly black. Whatever the body colour, this species has red eyes. The colour of juveniles can be more mottled than in adults. As they mature, their silvery body becomes less mottled and changes to a darker grey or black colour. How dark the fish become depends on the local water conditions; fish in Peru appear to be the darkest and may be almost jet black.

The maximum recorded fish measurement standard length is 41.5–61 centimetres (16.3–24.0 in), although a more normal length is around 32 centimetres (13 in), and they attain a maximum weight of 3.0 kilograms (6.6 lb).

== Habitat and biology ==
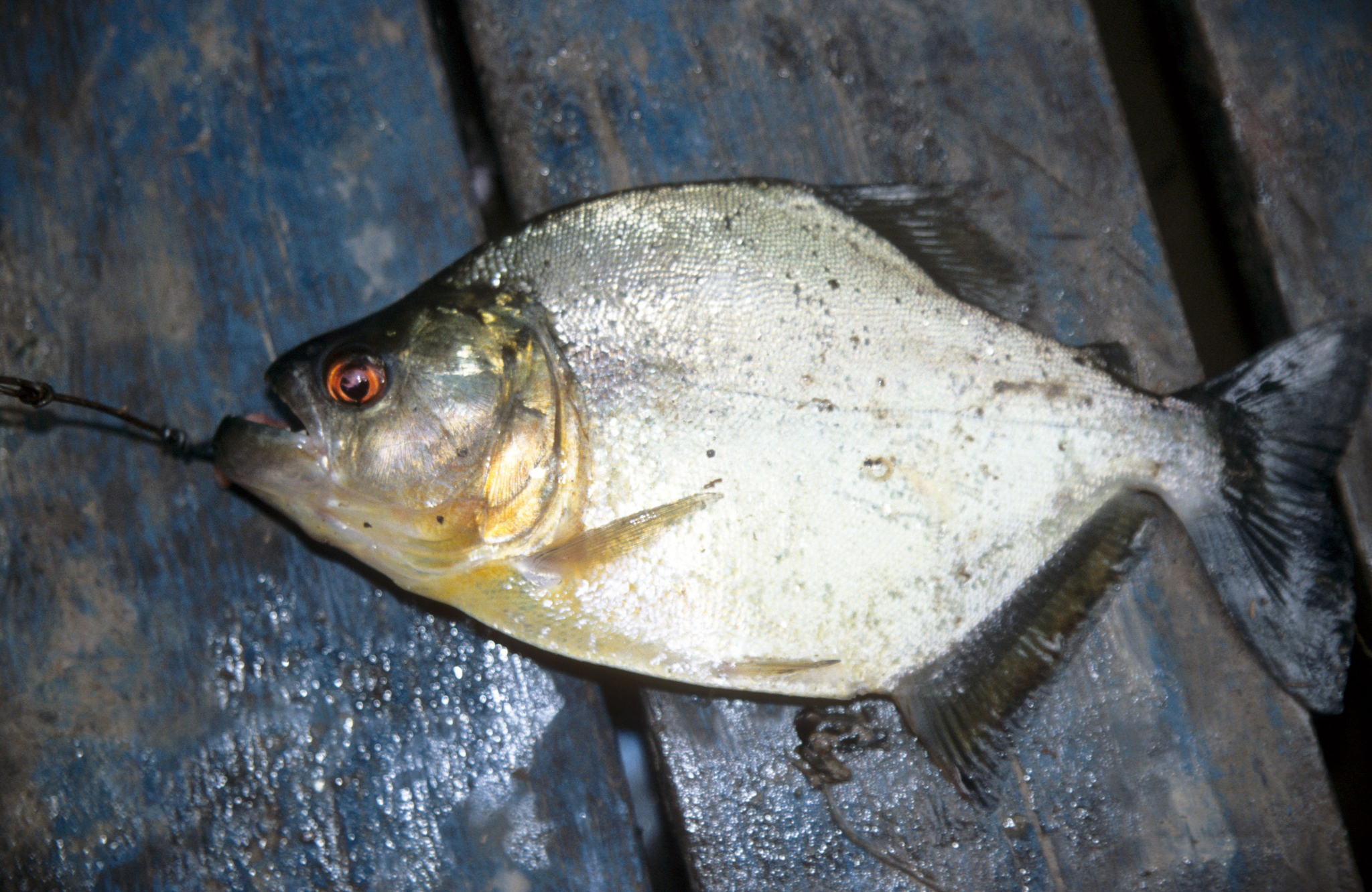
In Ecuador

The redeye piranha occurs in a wide variety of habitats, but the adults have a preference for the larger, deeper river channels, where they normally hunt for prey either in deep stretches or in the vicinity of rapids. The juveniles are most frequently recorded in stiller stretches where there is thick submerged or marginal vegetation. Paler coloured fish tend to be found in turbid white waters, while in clear or dark waters, dark fish predominate. These fish are opportunistic and omnivorous feeders which will eat plants, fallen fruits and animals smaller than themselves, such as insects and small fishes. They will also eat the scales and fins which they can nip off other fishes. They are well known scavengers, and feed on carcasses in the river. This is not a sociable species and normally lives solitarily. At least when breeding, they defend an area around the nest, which is placed among thick vegetation.
