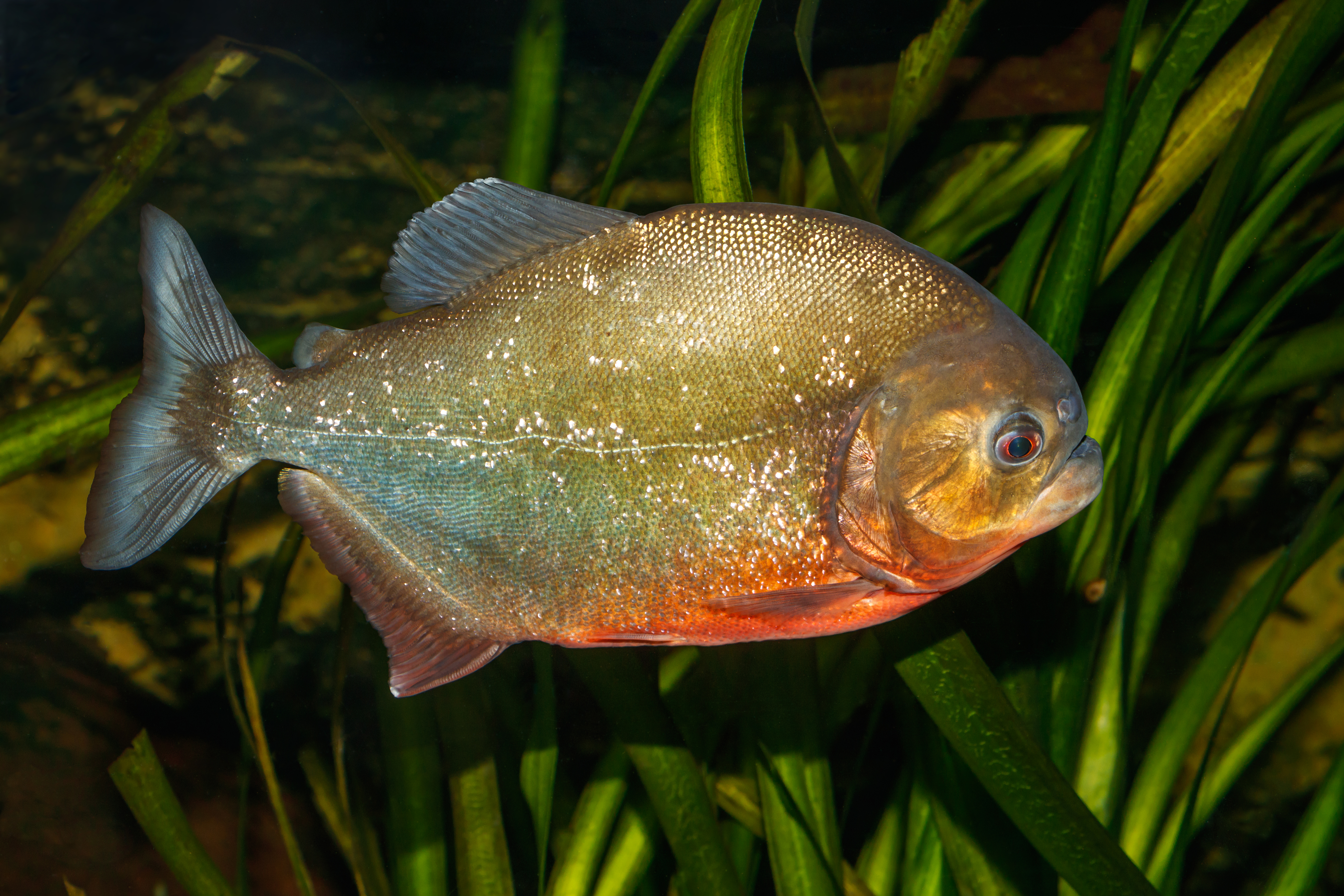
- A red-bellied piranha at the Karlsruhe Zoo

Scientific classification
- Kingdom: Animalia
- Phylum: Chordata
- Class: Actinopterygii
- Division: Teleostei
- Order: Characiformes
- Family: Serrasalmidae
- Subfamily: Serrasalminae

Included genera
- Catoprion; Pristobrycon; Pygocentrus; Pygopristis; Serrasalmus †Megapiranha

Cladistically included but traditionally excluded taxa
- Metynnis

= Piranha =

Piranha Temporal range: Miocene–Recent

Common name for certain fishes of the family Serrasalmidae

A piranha (/pɪˈrɑːn(j)ə/, or /pɪˈræn(j)ə/; Portuguese: [piˈɾɐ̃ɲɐ]) is any of a number of freshwater fish species in the subfamily Serrasalminae, of the family Serrasalmidae, in the order Characiformes. These fish inhabit South American rivers, floodplains, lakes and reservoirs. Although often described as extremely predatory and mainly feeding on fish, their dietary habits vary extensively, and they will also take plant material, leading to their classification as omnivorous.

== Etymology ==
The name originates from Old Tupi pirãîa, from Proto-Tupi-Guarani *pirãj, being first attested in Vocabulário da Língua Brasílica, a 1585 Portuguese–Tupi bilingual dictionary, as a translation for scissors. The first description and attribution of this name to the fish would occur two years later, in the 1587 treatise Notícia do Brasil by Portuguese explorer Gabriel Soares de Sousa.

Piranha first appears in 1710 in English literature, borrowed from Portuguese. Alternative spellings include the Spanish-derived piraña, as well as the archaic piraya.

== Taxonomy and evolution ==
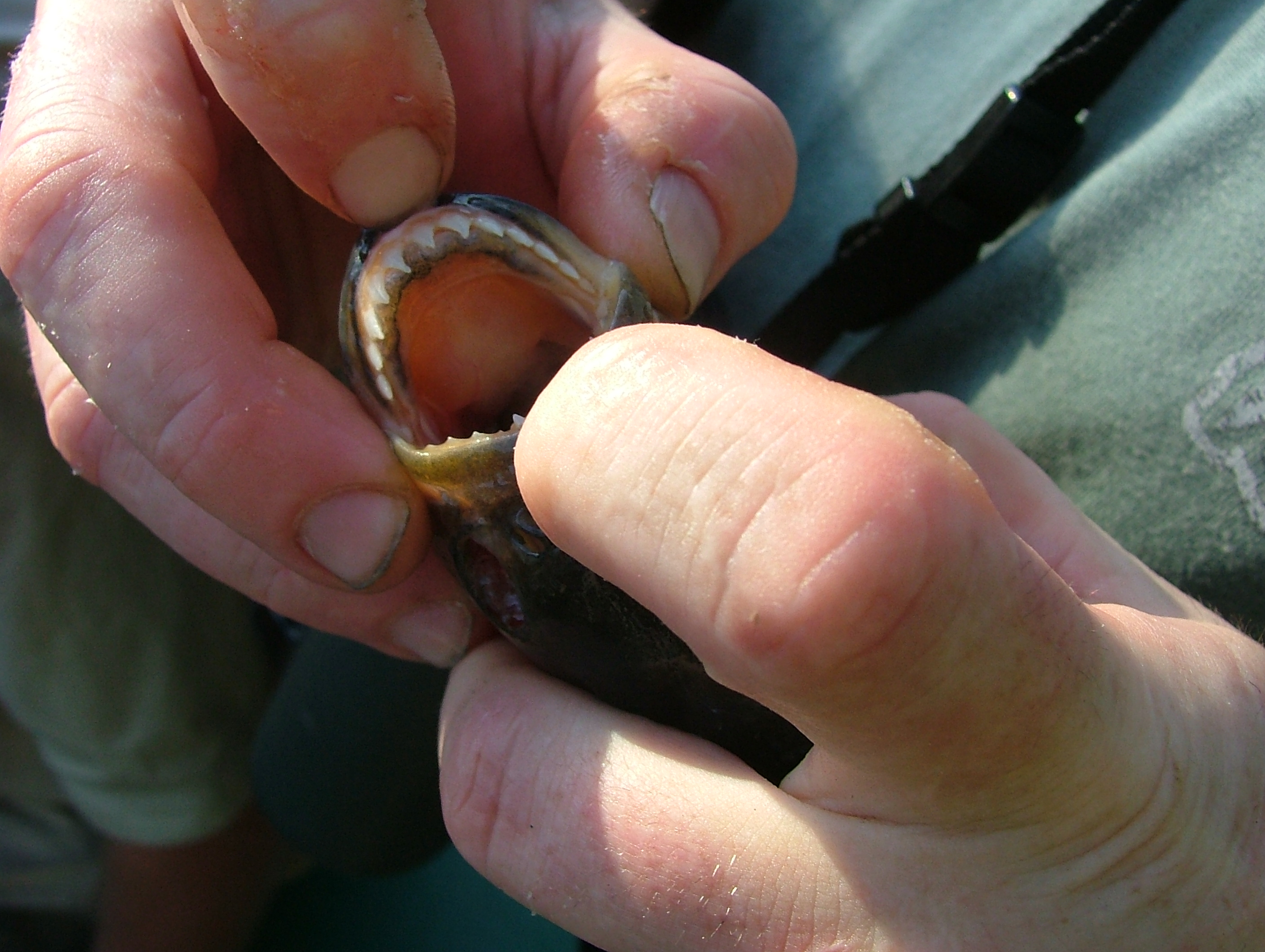
Piranha in Venezuela with its jaws held open to show its distinctive sharp teeth

Piranhas belong to the family Serrasalmidae, which includes closely related omnivorous fish such as pacus. Traditionally, only the four genera Pristobrycon, Pygocentrus, Pygopristis, and Serrasalmus are considered to be true piranhas, due to their specialized teeth. However, a recent analysis showed, if the piranha group is to be monophyletic, it should be restricted to Serrasalmus, Pygocentrus, and part of Pristobrycon, or expanded to include these taxa plus Pygopristis, Catoprion, and Pristobrycon striolatus. Pygopristis was found to be more closely related to Catoprion than the other three piranha genera.

Under more recent taxonomic treatments, essentially all members of the subfamily Serrasalminae within the family Serrasalmidae have "piranha" in their name, excluding the most basal members of the subfamily, Metynnis, which are referred to as "silver dollars".

The total number of piranha species is unknown and contested, and new species continue to be described. Estimates range from fewer than 30 to more than 60.

== Distribution ==
Piranhas are indigenous to the Amazon basin, in the Orinoco, in rivers of the Guianas, in the Paraguay–Paraná, and the São Francisco River systems, but there are major differences in the species richness. In a review where 38–39 piranha species were recognized, 25 were from the Amazon and 16 from Orinoco, while only three were present in Paraguay–Paraná and two in São Francisco. Most species are restricted to a single river system, but some (such as the red-bellied piranha) occur in several. Many species can occur together; for example, seven are found in Caño Maporal, a stream in Venezuela.

Aquarium piranhas have been unsuccessfully introduced into parts of the United States. In many cases, however, reported captures of piranhas are misidentifications of pacu (e.g., red-bellied pacu or Piaractus brachypomus is frequently misidentified as red-bellied piranha or Pygocentrus nattereri). Piranhas have also been discovered in the Kaptai Lake in southeast Bangladesh. Research is being carried out to establish how piranhas have moved to such distant corners of the world from their original habitat. Some rogue exotic fish traders are thought to have released them in the lake to avoid being caught by antipoaching forces. Piranhas were also spotted in the Lijiang River in China.

== Description ==
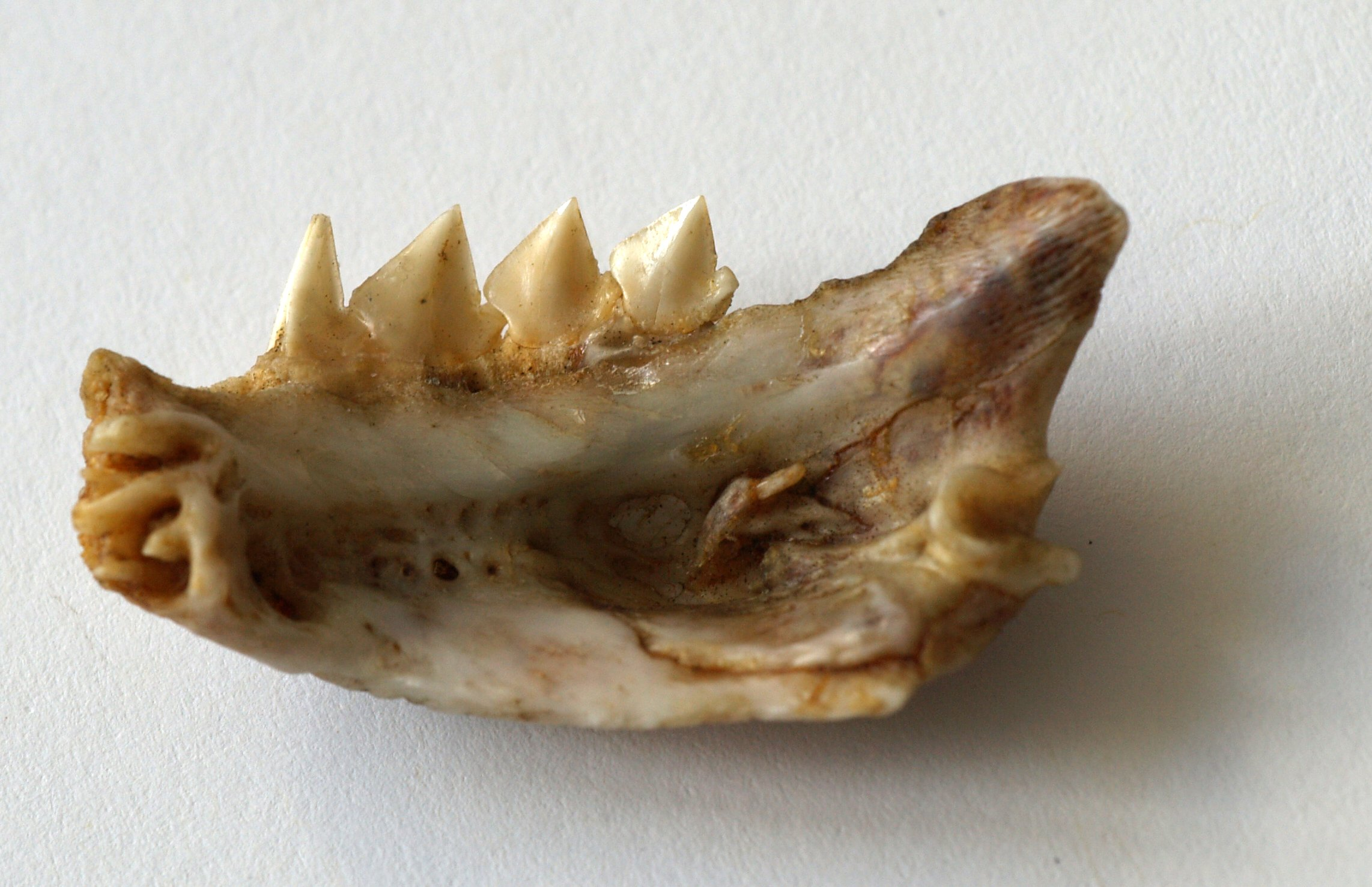
Jawbone of Pygocentrus nattereri

=== Size ===
Depending on the exact species, most piranhas grow to between 12 and 35 cm (5–14 in) long. A few can grow larger, with the largest living species, the red-bellied, reaching up to 50 cm (20 in). There are claims of São Francisco piranhas at up to 60 cm (24 in), but the largest confirmed specimens are considerably smaller. The extinct Megapiranha which lived 8–10 million years ago reached about 71 cm (28 in) long, and possibly even 128 cm (50 in).

=== Morphology ===
Serrasalmus, Pristobrycon, Pygocentrus, and Pygopristis are most easily recognized by their unique dentition. All piranhas have a single row of sharp teeth in both jaws. The teeth are tightly packed and interlocking (via small cusps) and are used for rapid puncture and shearing. Individual teeth are typically broadly triangular, pointed, and blade-like (flat in profile). The variation in the number of cusps is minor. In most species, the teeth are tricuspid with a larger middle cusp which makes the individual teeth appear markedly triangular. The exception is Pygopristis, which has pentacuspid teeth and a middle cusp usually only slightly larger than the other cusps.

=== Biting abilities ===
Piranhas have one of the strongest bites found in bony fishes. Relative to body mass, the black piranha (Serrasalmus rhombeus) produces one of the most forceful bites measured in vertebrates. This extremely powerful and dangerous bite is generated by large jaw muscles (adductor mandibulae) that are attached closely to the tip of the jaw, conferring the piranha with a mechanical advantage that favors force production over bite speed. Strong jaws combined with finely serrated teeth make them adept at tearing flesh.

== Ecology ==
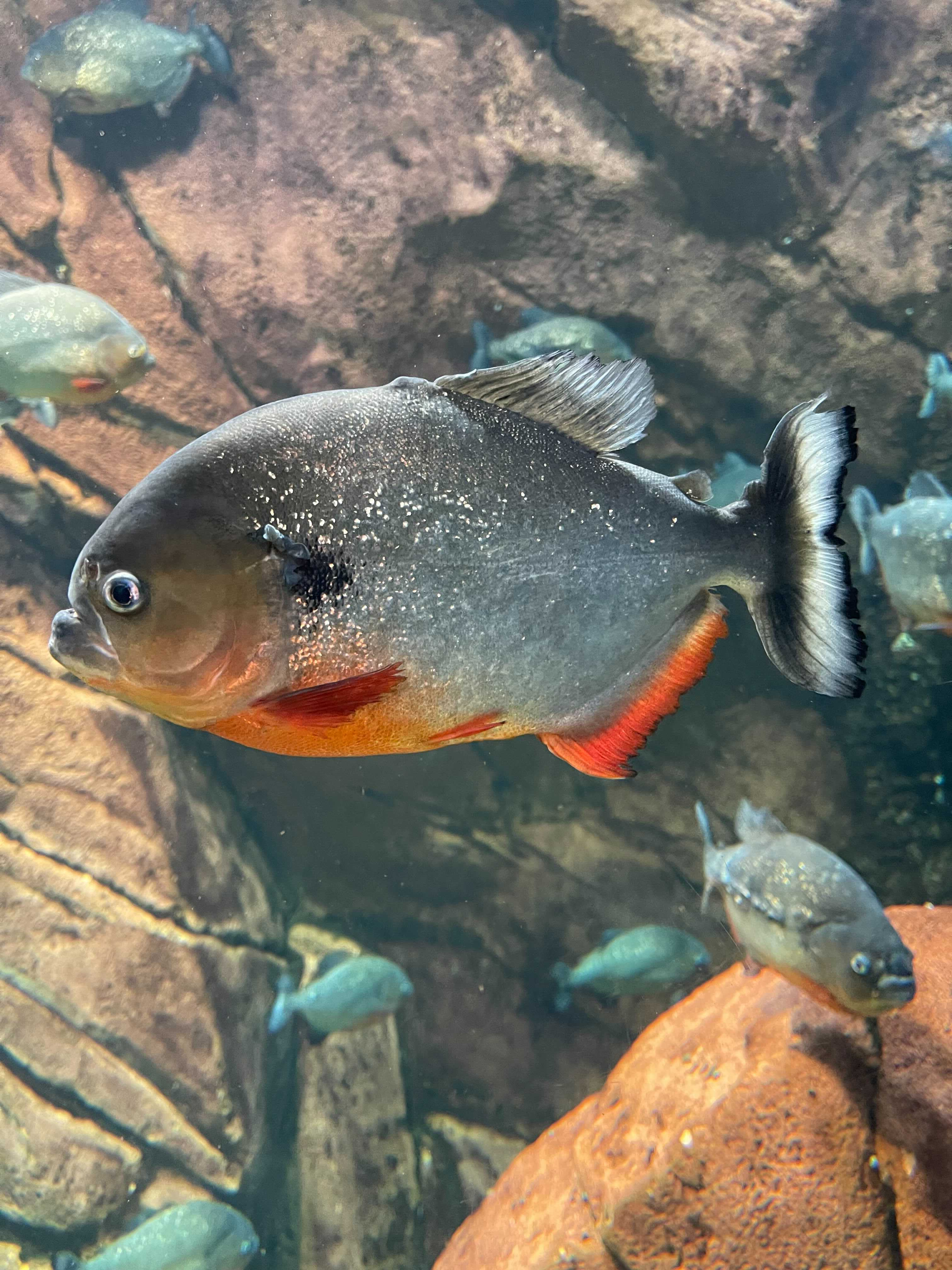
Close-up of a piranha at Georgia Aquarium

Piranhas vary extensively in ecology and behavior depending on exact species. Piranhas, especially the red-bellied (Pygocentrus nattereri), have a reputation as ferocious predators that hunt their prey in schools. Recent research, however, which "started off with the premise that they school as a means of cooperative hunting", discovered they are timid fish that schooled for protection from their own predators, such as cormorants, caimans, and dolphins. Piranhas are "basically like regular fish with large teeth". A few other species may also occur in large groups, while the remaining are solitary or found in small groups.

Although popularly described as highly predatory and primarily feeding on fish, piranha diets vary extensively, leading to their classification as omnivorous. In addition to fish (occasionally even their own species), documented food items for piranhas include other vertebrates (mammals, birds, reptiles), invertebrates (insects, crustaceans), fruits, seeds, leaves and detritus. The diet often shifts with age and size. Research on the species Serrasalmus aff. brandtii and Pygocentrus nattereri in Viana Lake in Maranhão, which is formed during the wet season when the Pindaré River (a tributary of the Mearim River) floods, has shown that they primarily feed on fish, but also eat vegetable matter. In another study of more than 250 Serrasalmus rhombeus at Ji-Paraná (Machado) River, 75% to 81% (depending on season) of the stomach content was fish, but about 10% was fruits or seeds. In a few species such as Serrasalmus serrulatus, the dietary split may be more equal, but this is less certain as based on smaller samples: Among 24 S. serrulatus from flooded forests of Ji-Paraná (Machado) River, there were several with fish remains in their stomachs, but half contained masticated seeds and in most of these this was the dominant item. Piranhas will often scavenge, and some species such as Serrasalmus elongatus are specialized scale-eaters, feeding primarily on scales and fins of other fish. Scale- and fin-eating is more widespread among juvenile and sub-adult piranhas.

Piranhas lay their eggs in pits dug during the breeding season and swim around to protect them. Newly hatched young feed on zooplankton, and eventually move on to small fish once large enough.

== Relationship with humans ==
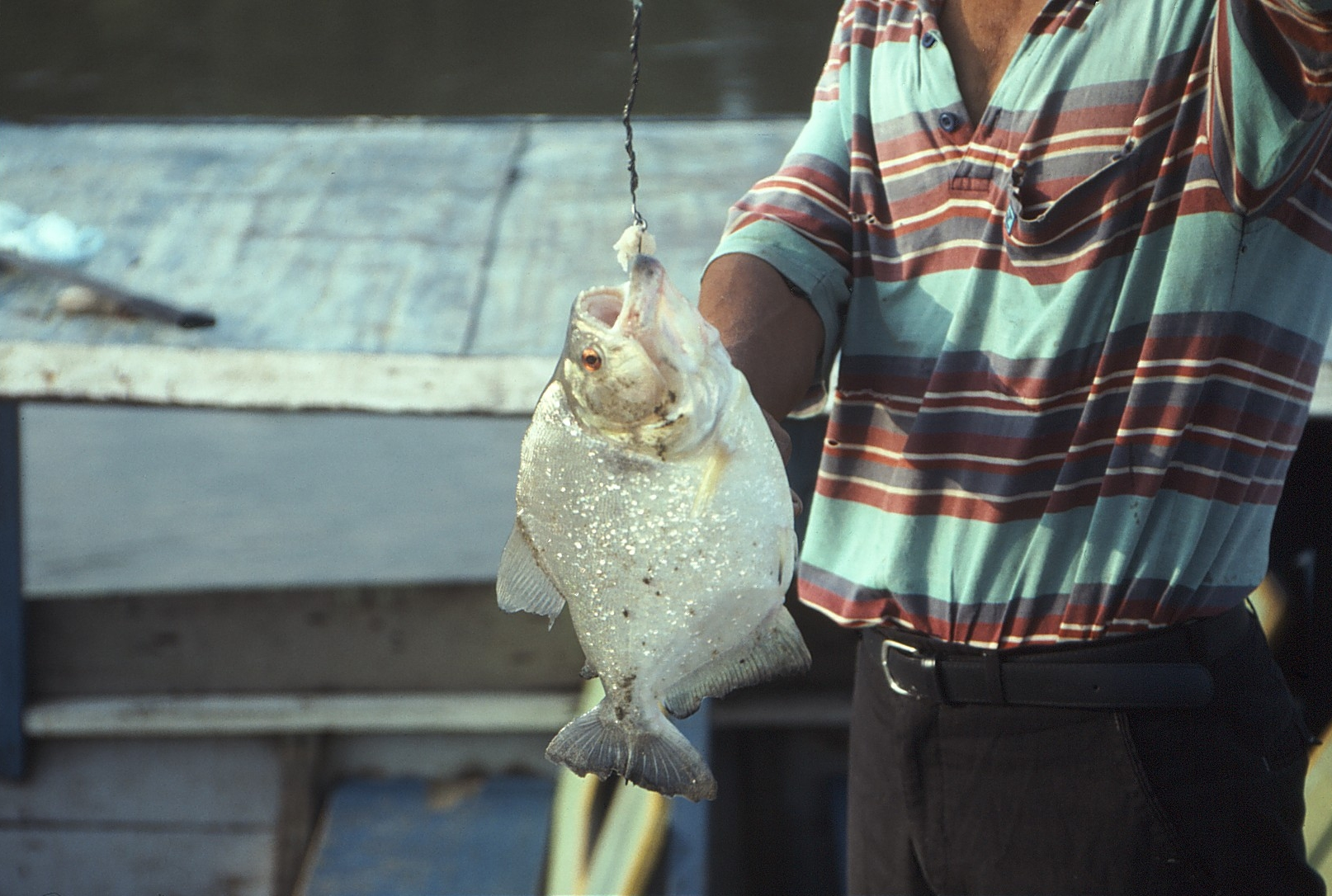
Fishing piranha on the Ucayali River

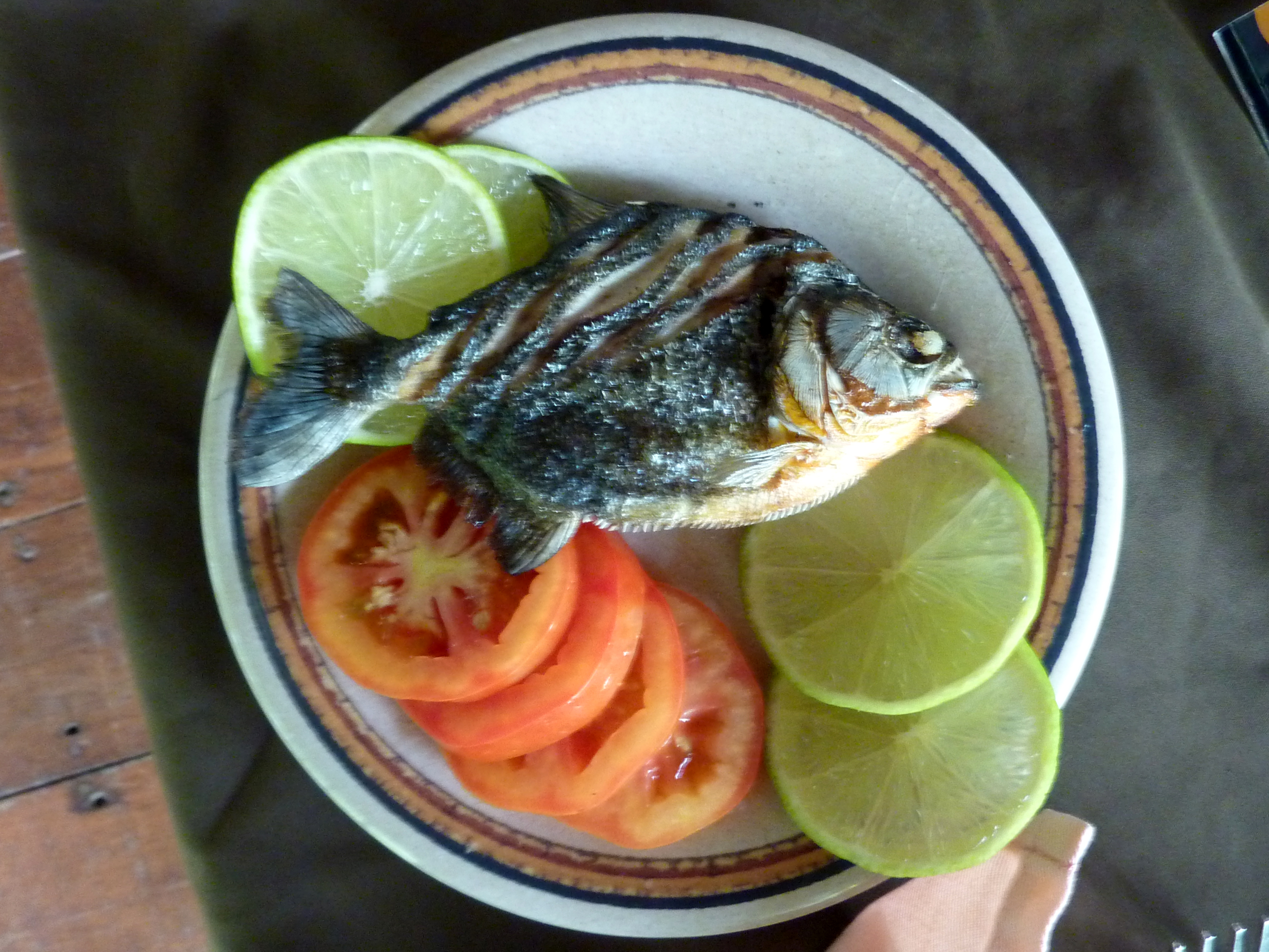
A piranha, lightly grilled, served as food in the Peruvian Amazon

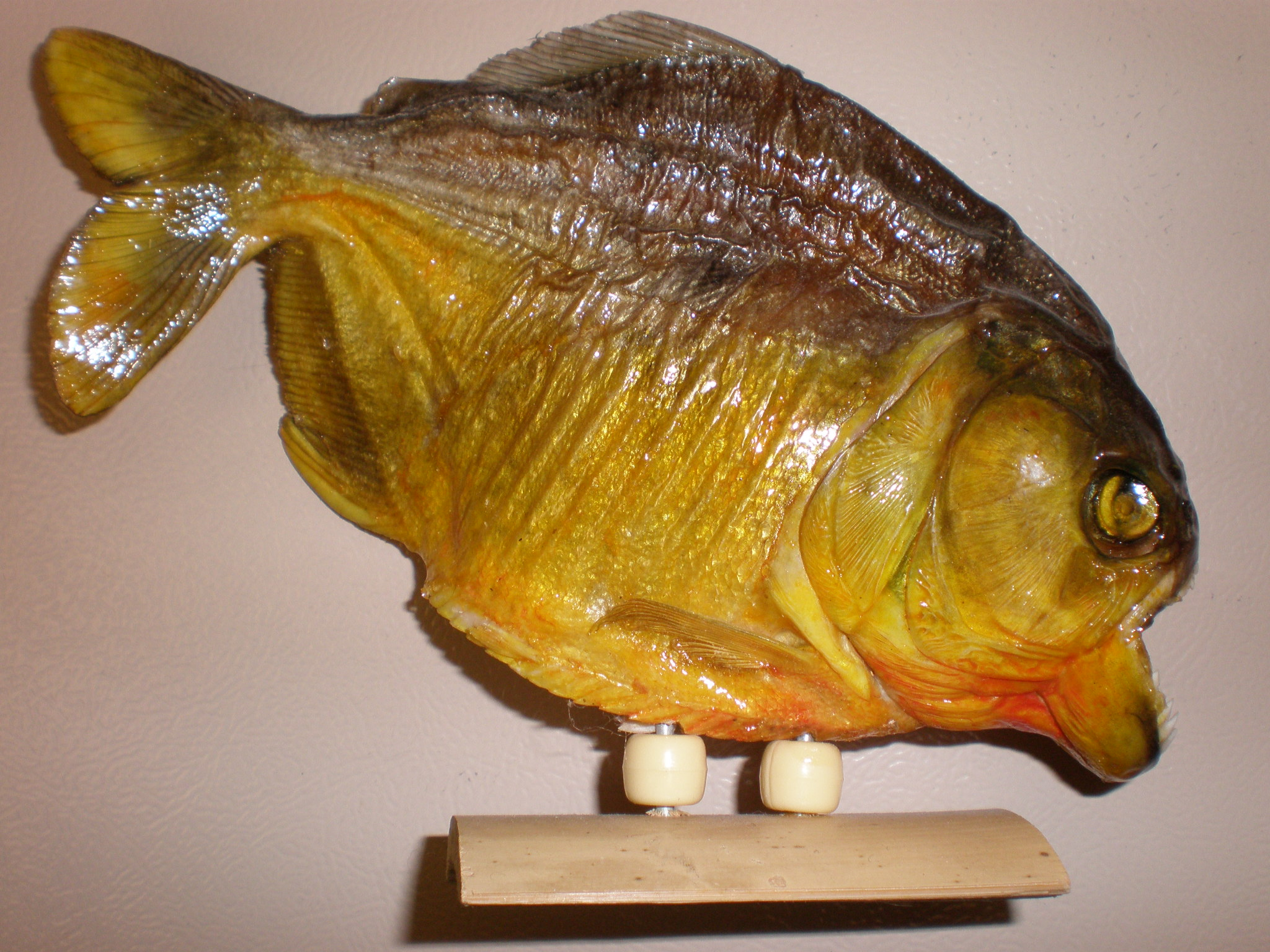
A souvenir piranha

Piranha teeth are often used as tools themselves (such as for carving wood or cutting hair) or to modify other tools (such as sharpening of darts). This practice has been documented among several South American tribes including the Camayura and Shavante in Brazil and the Pacahuara in Bolivia.

Piranhas are also popular as food, being both eaten as a subsistence catch by fishers and sold at market. However, they are often considered a nuisance by fishers because they steal bait, eat catches, damage fishing gear, and may bite when accidentally caught.

Piranhas can be bought as pets in some areas, but they are illegal in many parts of the United States, and in the Philippines, where importers face six months to four years in jail, and the piranhas are destroyed to prevent proliferation.

The most common aquarium piranha is Pygocentrus nattereri, the red-bellied piranha. Piranhas can be bought fully grown or as young, often no larger than a thumbnail. It is important to keep Pygocentrus piranhas alone or in groups of four or more, not in pairs, since aggression among them is common, not allowing the weaker fish to survive, and is distributed more widely when kept in larger groups. It is not uncommon to find individual piranhas with one eye missing due to a previous attack.

=== Attacks ===
Although often described as extremely dangerous in the media, piranhas typically do not represent a serious risk to humans. However, attacks have occurred, especially when the piranhas are in a stressed situation such as the dense groups that may occur when the water is lower during the dry season and food is relatively scarce. Swimming near fishermen may increase the risk of attacks due to the commotion caused by struggling fish and the presence of bait in the water. Splashing attracts piranhas and for this reason children are more often attacked than adults. Being in the water when already injured or otherwise incapacitated also increases the risk. Warning signs are sometimes placed at high-risk locations and beaches in such areas are sometimes protected by a barrier.

Most piranha attacks on humans only result in minor injuries, typically to the feet or hands, but they are occasionally more serious and very rarely can be fatal. Near the city of Palmas in Brazil, 190 piranha attacks, all involving single bites to the feet, were reported in the first half of 2007 in an artificial lake which appeared after the damming of the Tocantins River. In the state of São Paulo, a series of attacks in 2009 in the Tietê River resulted in minor injuries to 15 people. In 2011, another series of attacks at José de Freitas in the Brazilian state of Piauí resulted in 100 people being treated for bites to their toes or heels. On 25 December 2013, more than 70 bathers were attacked at Rosario in Argentina, causing injuries to their hands or feet.

Whereas reports of fatal attacks on humans are rare, piranhas will readily feed on bodies of people that already have died, such as drowning victims. In 2011, piranhas were blamed by a local police official for the death of a drunk 18-year-old who jumped into the Rosario del Yata, Bolivia. In 2012, a man from Manacapuru, Brazil told journalists that his neighbors' five-year-old daughter, who could not swim, was attacked and killed by a shoal of P. nattereri after entering the water from a floating dock. In January 2015, a six-year-old girl was found dead with signs of piranha bites on part of her body after her family canoe capsized during a vacation in Monte Alegre, Brazil. Family members suspected she had died of drowning prior to her body receiving the piranha bites.

== Reputation ==
Various stories exist about piranhas, typically red-bellied piranhas, that they can skeletonize a human body or cattle in seconds.

A common falsehood is that they can be attracted by blood and are exclusively carnivores. A Brazilian legend called "piranha cattle" says that they sweep the rivers at high speed and attack the first of the cattle entering the water, allowing the rest of the group to traverse the river. These legends were dismissed through research by Hélder Queiroz and Anne Magurran and published in Biology Letters.

Piranha solution, a mixture of sulfuric acid and hydrogen peroxide used to dissolve organic material, draws its name from these legends surrounding the piranha.

=== Accounts from Theodore Roosevelt ===
When former US president Theodore Roosevelt visited Brazil in 1913, he went on a hunting expedition through the Amazon rainforest. While standing on the bank of the Amazon River, he witnessed a spectacle created by local fishermen. After blocking off part of the river and starving the piranhas for several days, they pushed a cow into the water, where it was quickly torn apart and skeletonized by a school of hungry piranhas. Roosevelt later described piranhas as vicious creatures in his 1914 book Through the Brazilian Wilderness.

== See also ==
- Animal attack
- Animal bite
