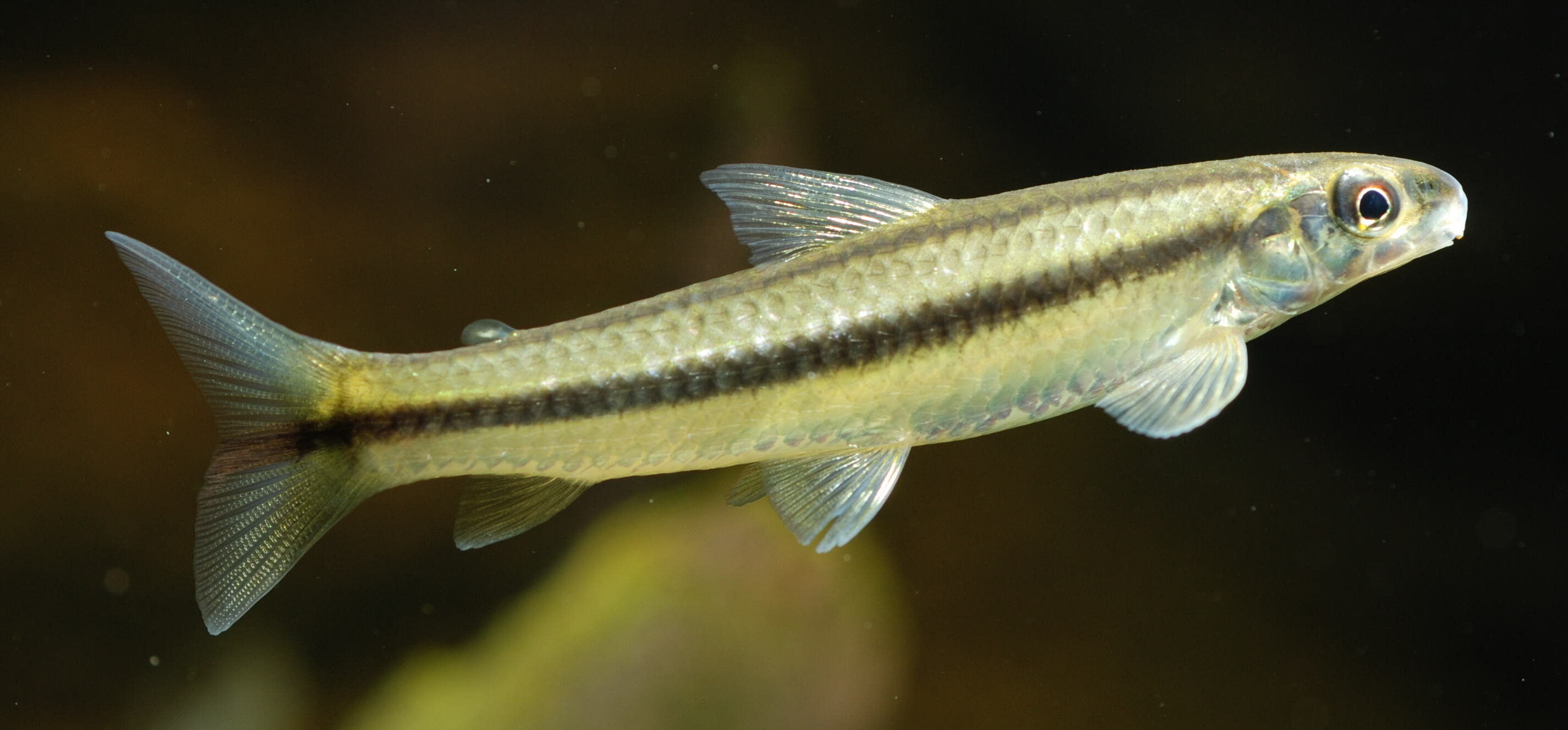

Conservation status
- Least Concern (IUCN 3.1)

Scientific classification
- Kingdom: Animalia
- Phylum: Chordata
- Class: Actinopterygii
- Order: Characiformes
- Family: Parodontidae
- Genus: Apareiodon
- Species: A. hasemani

Binomial name
- Apareiodon hasemani C. H. Eigenmann, 1916

= Apareiodon hasemani =

Species of fish

Apareiodon hasemani, or Haseman's characin, is a species of freshwater fish in the family Parodontidae (the scrapetooths). It is endemic to the São Francisco River basin of Brazil. First described by Carl H. Eigenmann in 1916, it is one of 16 members of the genus Apareiodon, all of which occur in South America. It grows to a maximum of 12.3 centimetres (4.8 in) in standard length.

== Taxonomy and etymology ==
Apareiodon hasemani was first described in 1916 by Carl H. Eigenmann. It is classified in the Parodontidae family, or the scrapetooths, of the order Characiformes. The generic name, Apareiodon, comes from the Greek a (without), pareia (cheek), and odous (teeth). The specific name, hasemani, honors ichthyologist John Diederich Haseman. It is known by the common name Haseman's characin. In Portuguese, its common name is canivete. The holotype is preserved at the Field Museum of Natural History in Chicago, Illinois, United States.

A. hasemani is one of 16 species in the genus Apareiodon, all of which are found in South America. Eigenmann described the genus as appearing similar to members of Parodon except that Parodon species have teeth in the sides of the lower jaw, but Apareiodon species do not; additionally, the ampulla of Vater is more highly developed in Parodon than Apareiodon.

== Distribution and habitat ==
A. hasemani is only found in Brazil, endemic to the São Francisco River basin. The type locality is Pirapora, Minas Gerais. It is a benthopelagic fish that prefers areas with fast currents and rocky substrates. It feeds on algae, usually during the day.

== Description ==
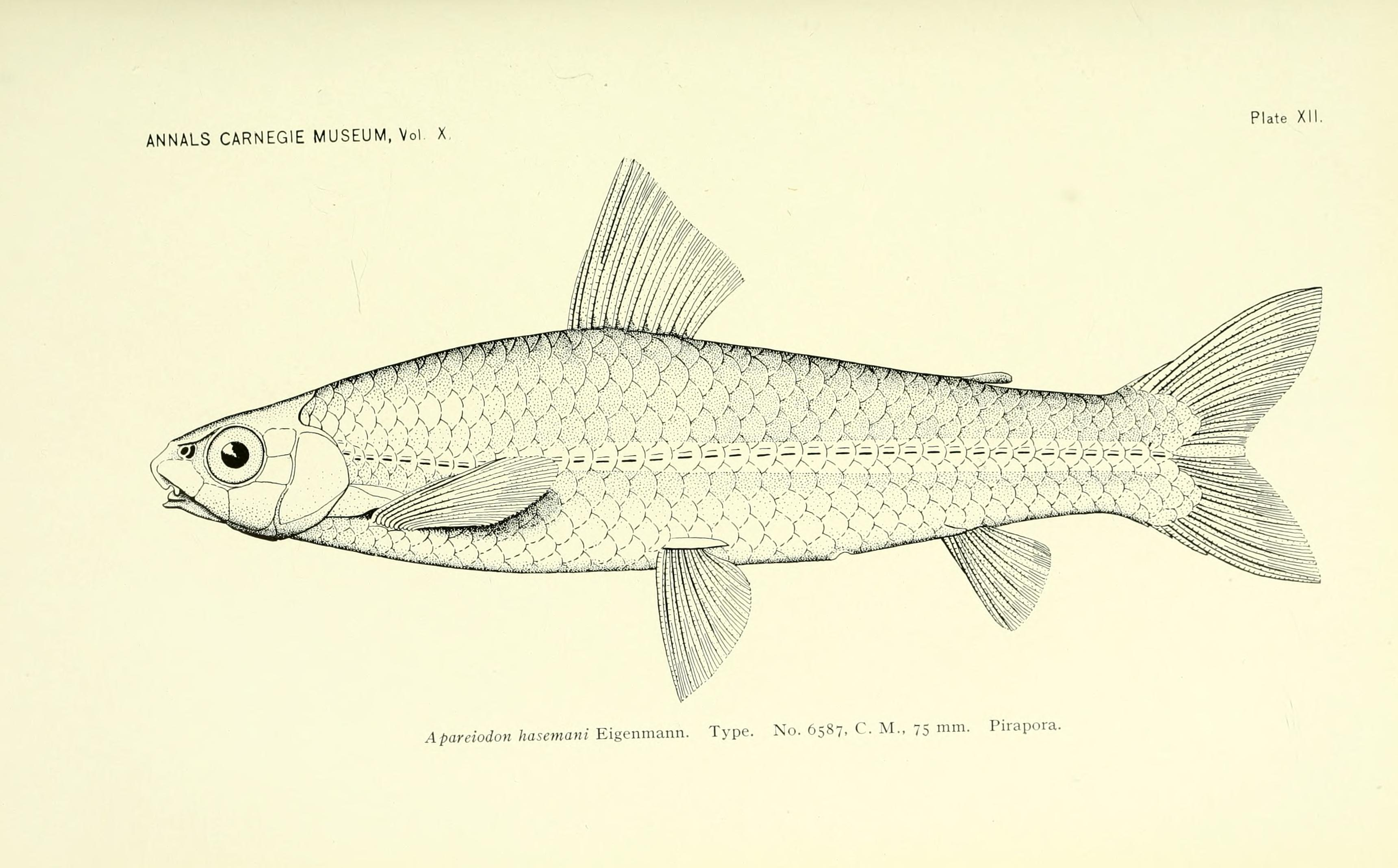
Apareiodon hasemani print from Annals of Carnegie Museum

This species reaches up to 12.3 cm (4.8 in) in standard length and 36.1 grams (1.3 oz). The mouth is inferior (downward-pointing). The fish has a dark stripe down the sides of its body at the lateral line and down the length of its back. The lateral line is usually 37 scales long, though one specimen's lateral line spanned 41 scales. There are 10–12 scales, and usually 11, before the start of the dorsal fin. It has four premaxillary teeth and one maxillary tooth. It is a strong swimmer with well-developed pectoral fins.

A. hasemani has 54 pairs of chromosomes; like several other fishes, it has the ZW sex-determination system, in which males have ZZ and females have ZW sex chromosomes.

== Conservation ==
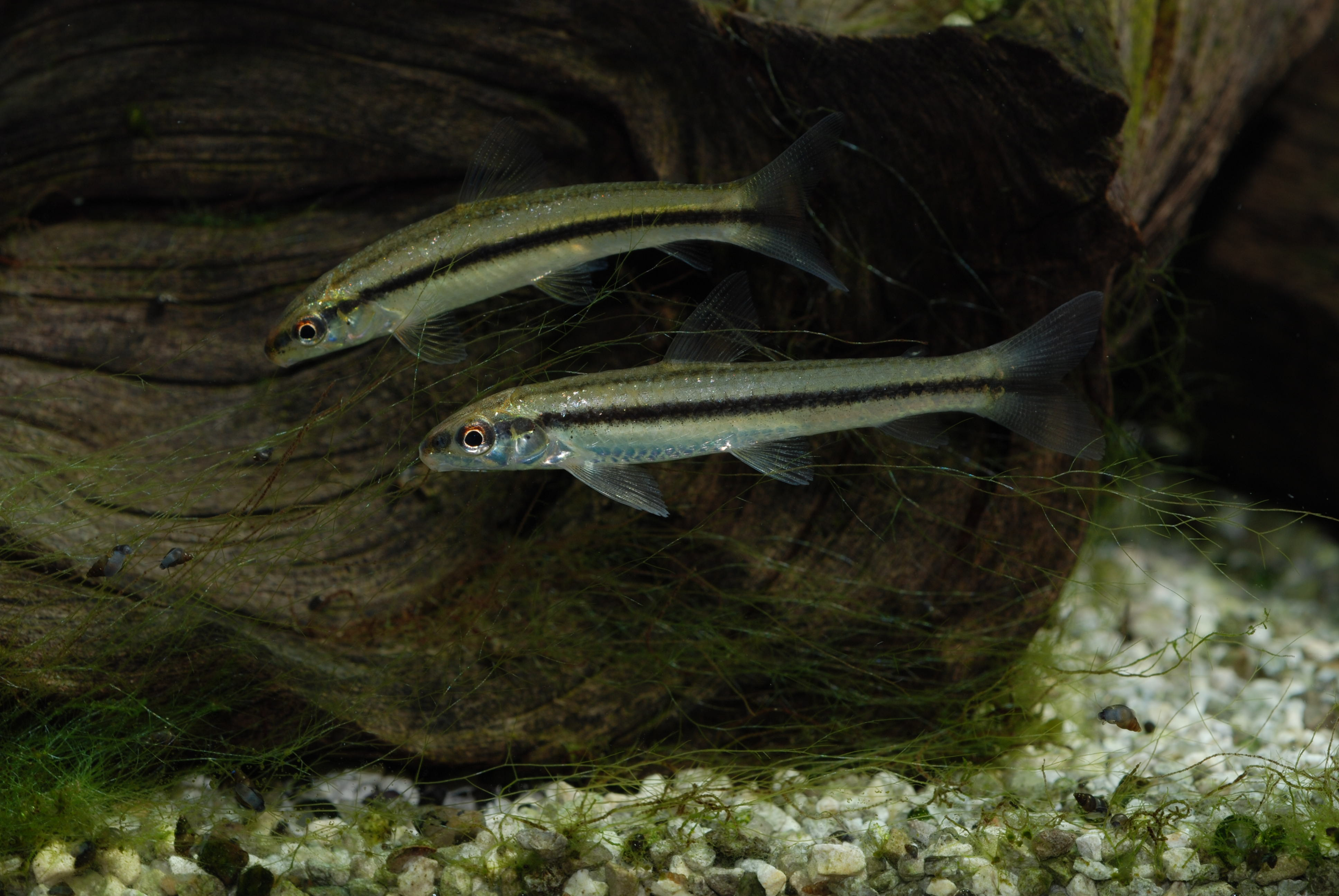
Two Apareiodon hasemani individuals

A. hasemani is assessed as a least concern species on the IUCN Red List. It is abundant in its range. Though several threats have been identified in the fish's range, including dam construction, deforestation, agricultural runoff, and urban wastewater pollution, the species's population appears stable.
