= John Diederich Haseman =

American zoologist, geologist and explorer

- Born: September 14, 1882; Linton, Indiana
- Died: May 1, 1969 (aged 86)
- Education: Indiana University, Columbia University
- Occupations: Zoologist, geologist, and explorer
- Spouse: Nanolyn D. Deupree
- Children: John D. Haseman III and Frances C. Haseman
- Parent(s): John Dedrick Haseman and Elizabeth Christina Shultze Haseman

John Diederich Haseman (September 14, 1882 – May 1969) was an American zoologist, geologist, and explorer for the Carnegie Museum. He is credited with naming at least seven taxa and has at least twenty species named in his honor. The genus Hasemania is also named after him. He later became a businessman and farmer.

== Early life ==
Haseman was one of nine children born to John Dedrick Haseman and Elizabeth Christina Shultze Haseman, and grew up in Linton, Indiana. Beginning his higher education in 1901, he studied at Indiana University (IU) where one of his instructors was Carl H. Eigenmann. He taught for two years at an elementary school near Linton and taught for one year at a high school in Delphi, Indiana. As an undergraduate he went on two trips to explore caves in Cuba and spent three summers at the IU Biological Station in Winona Lake.

He received his A.B. degree in 1905 and his A.M. degree in 1907, both in zoology, from IU. In 1911, he received his Ph.D. from Columbia University. He is occasionally listed with the suffix "Jr." even though his and his father's middle names are spelled differently.

== Carnegie Museum ==
Haseman's big break came in 1906 when John Casper Branner invited Eigenmann to accompany him on an expedition to Brazil. Eigenmann was not able to make the trip but did not want to lose the chance to learn from Branner's experience. He worked with William Jacob Holland at the Carnegie Museum to get someone approved to go in his place. That person was his student, Haseman.

Haseman was not able to reach Bahia, Brazil, until October 1907, which was when Branner was preparing to come home. Haseman learned as much as he could in the few days he had with Branner before starting his own exploration of eastern Brazil, Uruguay, Argentina, and Paraguay. He made ten individual trips into the South American interior and did not return home until February 1910. The collection of fishes he brought home was, at the time, one of the largest collections in the world, second only to Harvard University’s Agassiz collection.

During the expedition, Haseman also collected other animals such as freshwater mussels. This collection was used by Marion Durbin Ellis in 1911 to identify and describe three new genera of fishes, including Hasemania, and their species. It was also used by Arnold Edward Ortmann for his study of South American naiads which was published in 1921 and described thirteen new taxa. He also made notes on the Pawumwa Indians and their language as well as collected information for a book he authored: Some Factors of Geographical Distribution in South America. This book, and Haseman himself, are referred to by Theodore Roosevelt in his book Through the Brazilian Wilderness. In Appendix A of the book, Roosevelt praises Haseman's accuracy and theories but is critical of his writing style.

== Second trip to South America ==
Haseman made a second trip to South America from 1912 to 1913. He collected species from the Rio Branco basin and the Rupununi River. He gave this collection to the Naturhistorisches Museum in Vienna. He was able to stay in Vienna for a year to study the collection with Franz Steindachner. Only one major article was published on this collection, by Steindachner in 1915, mostly due to World War I and the death of Steindachner soon after the war.

== Later life ==
After leaving Vienna, Haseman's attention focused on geology and chemistry. By 1917, he was living in Pensacola, Florida, building a dye company. His company produced sap brown (humate), an organic sodium salt used in the manufacture of brown dyes, stains, van dyke pigment, paints, and ink, at a plant near Ft. Walton. Germany had been the main supplier to the United States until 1914, when trade was reduced by World War I. Haseman found a source in Florida, near Lake Lorraine, and was able to provide the substance until the end of the war. When trade resumed with Germany the plant was forced to close.

When his father died in 1924, Haseman had been living with his parents in Linton.

Haseman would have three patents. The first, in 1931, would be for a solid silicic acid that contained bleaching agents (patent number 1,838,621). The second and third, he co-patented with his brother William P. Haseman in 1933. The second was for a method for breaking petroleum emulsions (patent number 1,914,665) and the third was for a method to treat bentonite (patent number 1,929,113).

== Personal ==
He married Nanolyn D. Deupree on 25 August 1913, in New York City. They had two children, John D. Haseman III and Frances C. Haseman. Haseman was the brother of Mary Gertrude Haseman, William P. Haseman, Leonard Haseman, Joseph H. Haseman, Oscar Haseman, Bertha A. Haseman, and Arthur Haseman.

== Eponyms ==
=== Species named for Haseman ===
Haseman's gecko (Gonatodes hasemani)
Leucophenga hasemani
Parapteronotus hasemani
Imparfinis hasemani
Hyphessobrycon hasemani
Trichomycterus hasemani
Otocinclus hasemani
Rineloricaria hasemani
Centrodoras hasemani
Achirus hasemani
Farlowella hasemani
Argia hasemani
Moenkhausia hasemani
Apareiodon hasemani
Pseudepapterus hasemani
Pamphorichthys hasemani
Pimelodella hasemani
Characidium hasemani Steindachner, 1915
Leptodoras hasemani
Teleonemia hasemani
Poecilli hasemani
Potamoglanis hasemani

== Genera named by Haseman ==
Acestridium
Cephalosilurus
Platysilurus
Rhamdiopsis

== Publications ==
- 1. "Campostoma brevis, A New Species of Fish from Wabash, Indiana". Indiana Academy of Science, 1905.
- 2. "The Direction of Differentiation in Regenerating Crustacean Appendages". Archiv für Entwickelungsmechanik der Organismen, XXIV Band, 4 Heft, pp. 617–637, 1907.
- 3. "The Reversal of the Direction of Differentiation in the Chelipeds of the Hermit Crab". Archiv für Entwickelungsmechanik der Organismen, XXIV Band, 4 Heft, pp. 663–669, 1907.
- 4. "The Rhythmical Movements of Littorina litorea Synchronous with Ocean Tides". Biology Bulletin, Vol. XXI, No. 2, pp. 113–120, 1911.
- 5. "A Brief Report upon the Expedition of the Carnegie Museum to central South America". Annals of the Carnegie Museum, Vol. VII, pp. 287–314, 1911.
- 6. "Description of Some New Species of Fishes and Miscellaneous Notes on Others Obtained During the Expedition of the Carnegie Museum to central South America". Annals of the Carnegie Museum, Vol. VII, pp. 315–328, 1911.
- 7. "Annotated Catalog of Cichlid Fishes Collected by the Expedition of the Carnegie Museum to central South America". Annals of the Carnegie Museum, Vol. VII, pp. 329–372, 1911.
- 8. "Some New Species of Fishes from the Rio Iguassu". Annals of the Carnegie Museum, Vol. VII, pp. 374–387, 1911.
- 9. "The Relationships of the Genus Priscacara". Bulletin of the American Museum of Natural History, Article VII, 1912.
- 10. "The Pawumwa, a New Tribe of South American Indians". Journal of American Anthropology, 1912.
- 11. "The Humic Acid Origin of Asphalt". American Association of Petroleum Geologists Bulletin, Vol. 5, No. 1, pp. 75–79, 1921.
- 12. "Explanation of How Fullers Earth Bleaches Oils". The Chemist’s Section of the Cotton Oil Press, Vol 7, pp. 37–38, with R.C. Wallace, March 1924.
- 13. "The Alleged Catalytic Action of Fullers Earth on Coloring Matter in Oils". Journal of Physical Chemistry, Vol. 33, No. 10, pp. 1514–1527, 1929.
- 14. "Origin and Environment of Source Sediments of Petroleum Deposits". American Association of Petroleum Geologists Bulletin, Vol. 14, No. 11, pp. 1465–1468, 1930.
- 15. "More Theory on Origin of Cave Species". Bulletin of the National Speleological Society, Vol. 8, pp. 37–38, July 1946.
