= Ancistrus bufonius =

Conservation status
- Least Concern (IUCN 3.1)

Scientific classification
- Kingdom: Animalia
- Phylum: Chordata
- Class: Actinopterygii
- Order: Siluriformes
- Family: Loricariidae
- Genus: Ancistrus
- Species: A. bufonius

Binomial name
- Ancistrus bufonius (Valenciennes, 1840)

Synonyms
- Hypostomus bufonius Valenciennes, 1840; Hypostomus calamita Valenciennes, 1840; ancistrus calamita (Valenciennes, 1840)

Species of catfish

Ancistrus bufonius is a species of freshwater ray-finned fish belonging to the family Loricariidae, the suckermouth armoured catfishes, and the subfamily Hypostominae, the suckermouth catfishes. This catfish is found in South America in Bolivia and Peru.

== Taxonomy ==
Ancistrus bufonius was first formally described by the French zoologist Achille Valenciennes in volume 15 of Histoire naturelle des poissons published in 1840, with its type locality given as the Apurímac River in Peru, from an elevation of 2,000 m (6,600 ft). Eschmeyer's Catalog of Fishes classified the genus Ancistrus in the subfamily Hypostominae, the suckermouth catfishes, within the suckermouth armored catfish family Loricariidae. It has also been classified in the tribe Ancistrini by some authorities.

== Etymology ==
Ancistrus bufonius is classified in the genus Ancistrus, a name coined by Rudolf Kner when he proposed the genus but Kner did not explain the etymology of the name. It is thought to be from the Greek ágkistron, meaning a "fish hook" or the "hook of a spindle", a reference to the hooked odontodes on the interopercular bone. The specific name, bufonius, means "toad-like" a reference to the toad-like body shape of this catfish.

== Description ==
Ancistrus bufonius reaches a standard length of 11.5 cm (4.5 in). Ancistrus species develop soft, bushy tentacles on the snout when sexually mature, these are better developed in the males than they are in females.

== Distribution and habit ==
Ancistrus brevifilis is found in South America where it occurs in the Ucayali River in Peru and the Beni, Mamoré and Grande River basins in Bolivia. This catfish is found in clear water rivers.
