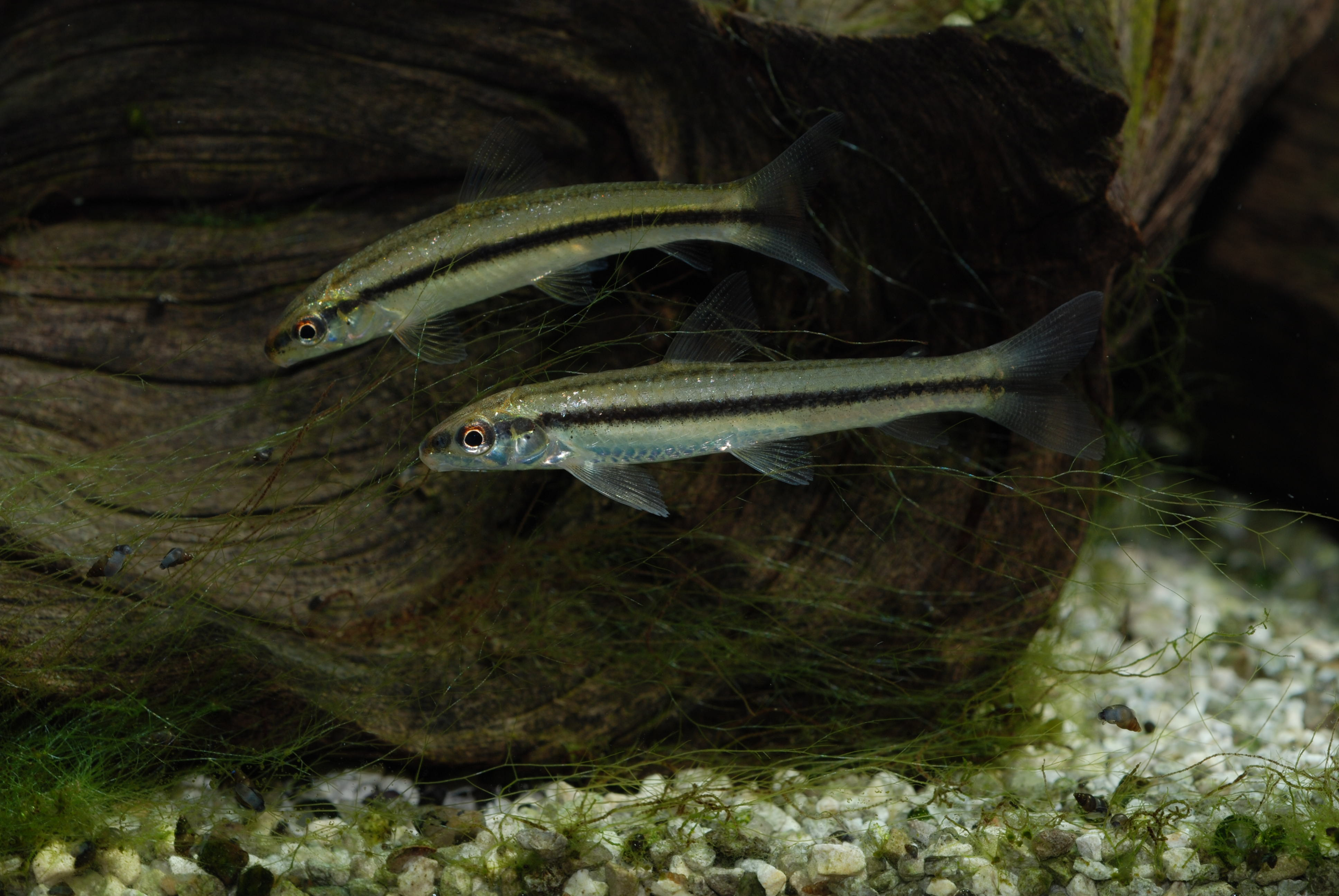

Scientific classification
- Kingdom: Animalia
- Phylum: Chordata
- Class: Actinopterygii
- Order: Characiformes
- Family: Parodontidae
- Genus: Apareiodon; C. H. Eigenmann, 1916

Type species
- Parodon piracicabae C. H. Eigenmann, 1907

= Apareiodon =

Genus of fishes

Apareiodon is a genus of freshwater ray-finned fishes belonging to the family Parodontidae, the scrapetooths. The fishes in this genus are found in the Neotropics, where they occur as far south as Río de la Plata.

== Taxonomy ==
Apareiodon was first proposed as a genus by the American ichthyologist Carl H. Eigenamnn in Volume 10 of the Annals of Carnegie Museum, published in 1916. When he proposed the genus, Eigenmann designated Parodon piracicabae as its type species. P. piracicabae was first formally described by Eigenmann in An annotated list of characin fishes in the United States National Museum and the Museum of Indiana University, with descriptions of new species, cowritten with Fletcher Ogle in volume 33 of Proceedings of the United States National Museum, published in 1907, with its type locality given as Piracicaba on the Piracicaba River in Estado de São Paulo, Brazil. Apareiodon is classified within the family Parodontidae, the scrapetooths, within the suborder Characoidei of the order Characiformes.

== Species ==
Apareiodon contains the following species:

- Apareiodon affinis (Steindachner, 1879) (Darter characine)
- Apareiodon agmatos Taphorn, López-Fernández & C. R. Bernard, 2008
- Apareiodon argenteus Pavanelli & Britski, 2003
- Apareiodon cavalcante Pavanelli & Britski, 2003
- Apareiodon davisi Fowler, 1941
- Apareiodon gransabana W. C. Starnes & I. Schindler, 1993
- Apareiodon hasemani C. H. Eigenmann, 1916
- Apareiodon ibitiensis Amaral Campos, 1944
- Apareiodon itapicuruensis C. H. Eigenmann & Henn, 1916
- Apareiodon machrisi Travassos, 1957
- Apareiodon piracicabae (C. H. Eigenmann, 1907)
- Apareiodon tigrinus Pavanelli & Britski, 2003
- Apareiodon vittatus Garavello, 1977
- Apareiodon vladii Pavanelli, 2006

== Etymology ==
Apareiodon puts the prefix a-, which means "without" in Greek, in front of pareia, meaning "cheek", combined with odon, which is a Latinised derivative of the Greek oudos, meaning "teeth". This is an allusion to the absence of lateral teeth in the lower jaw.

== Characteristics ==
Apareiodon was described by Eignemann as being distinguished from Parodon by the lack of teeth in the side of the lower jaw, and by the ampullae on the upturned margin of the maxilla, with which the teeth are associated on Parodon, being less well developed in this genus. These are small fishes with lengths ranging from a standard length of 5.6 cm (2.2 in) in A. cavalcante, to a total length of 18.1 cm (7.1 in) in A. affinis.

== Distribution ==
Apareiodon scrapetooths are found in southern Central and South America, from Panama south to the Río de la Plata catchment.
