= Huanyam =

Huanyam, Wañam, or Pawumwa may refer to:

- Huanyam people, a historic ethnic group of Brazil
- Huanyam language, an extinct language of Brazil
