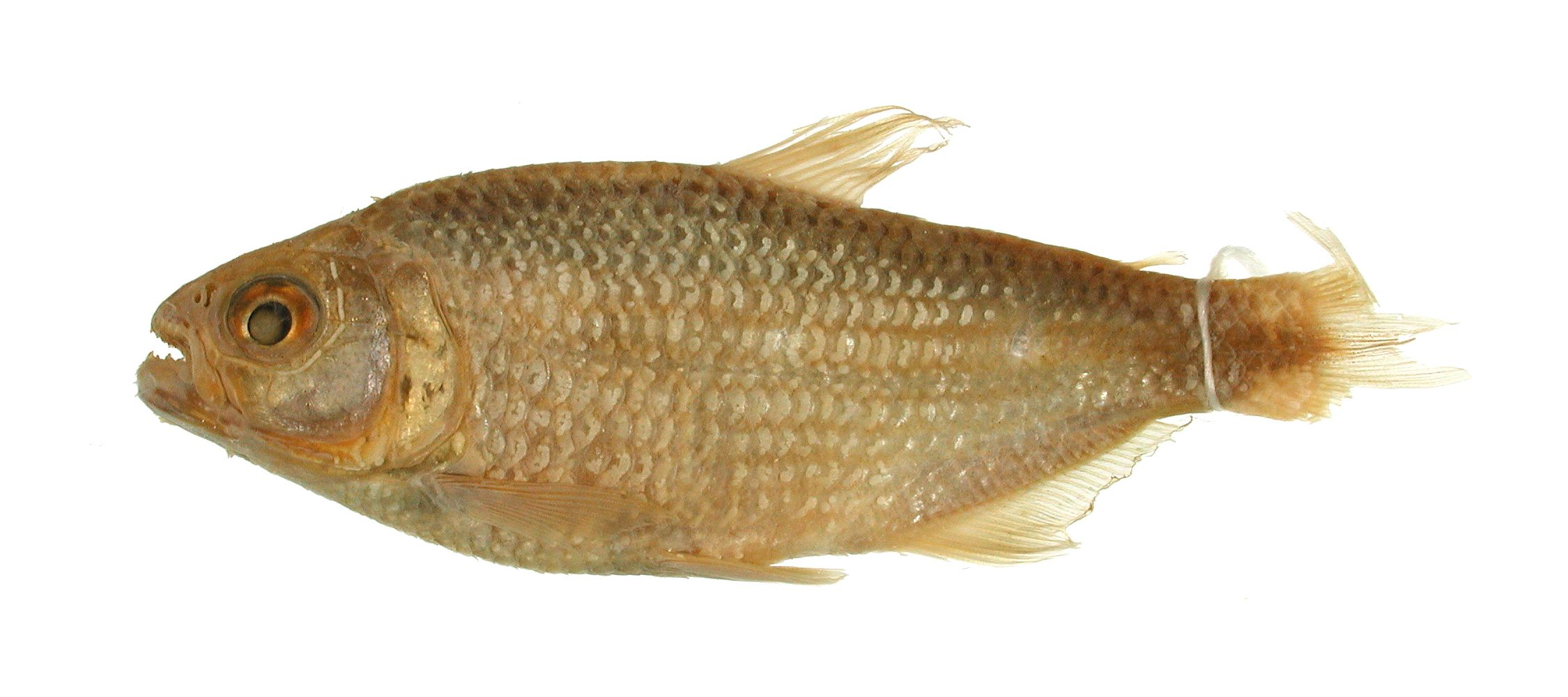
- Bario steindachneri

Scientific classification
- Kingdom: Animalia
- Phylum: Chordata
- Class: Actinopterygii
- Order: Characiformes
- Family: Acestrorhamphidae
- Subfamily: Thayeriinae
- Genus: Bario; Myers, 1940

Type species
- Tetragonopterus steindachneri C. H. Eigenmann, 1893

Synonyms
- Entomolepis C. H. Eigenmann, 1893 (Preoccupied)

= Bario (fish) =

Genus of fish

Bario is a genus of freshwater ray-finned fish belonging to the family Acestrorhamphidae, the American characins. The glass tetra and redeye tetra, which are commonly kept in aquaria, are members of this genus. Most of the species, except the formerly monotypic type species, were formerly classified in Moenkhausia.

== Species ==
Bario contains the following valid species:

- Bario australe C. H. Eigenmann, 1908
- Bario cosmops F. C. T. Lima, Britski & Machado, 2007
- Bario diktyotus F. C. T. Lima & Toledo-Piza, 2001
- Bario forestii Benine, Mariguela & C. de Oliveira, 2009
- Bario lineomaculatus D'Agosta, Marinho & Benine, 2015
- Bario oligolepis (Günther, 1864) (Glass tetra)
- Bario sanctaefilomenae (Steindachner, 1907) (Redeye tetra)
- Bario skolioplatus (Bertaco & Carvalho, 2005)
- Bario steindachneri (C. H. Eigenmann, 1893)
- Bario uirapuru Ohara & F. C. T. Lima, 2015
