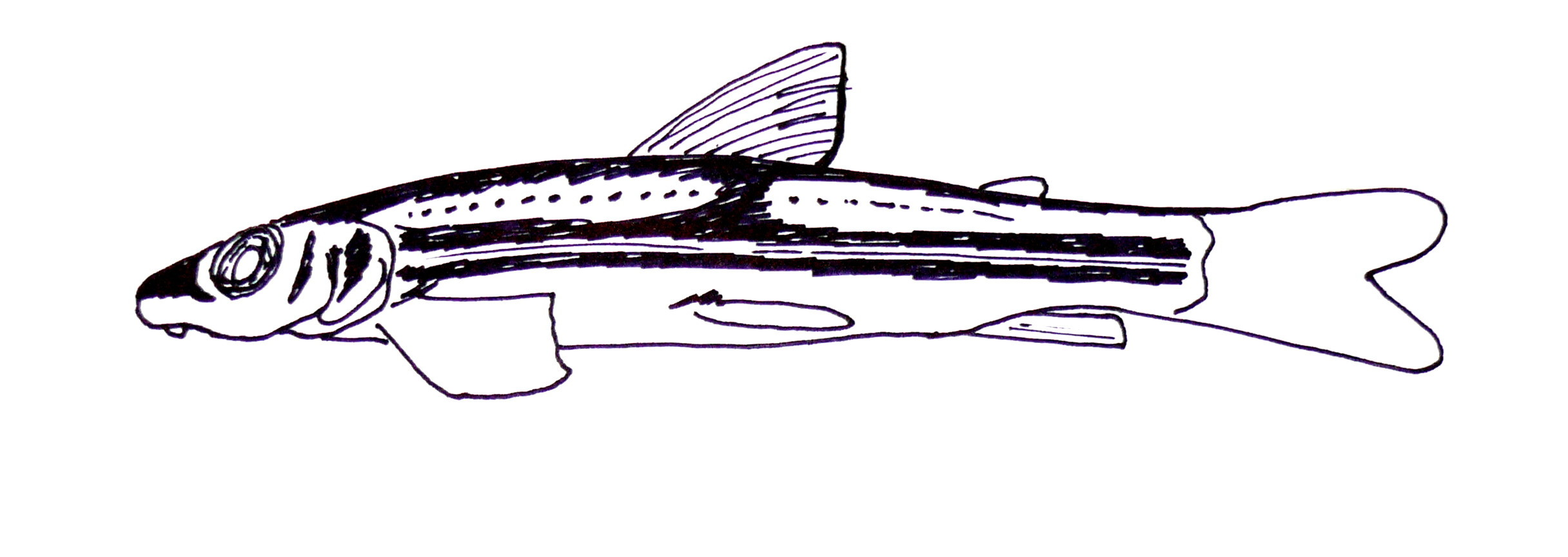
- illustration of Parodon guyanensis, a species of this genus of fishes

Scientific classification
- Kingdom: Animalia
- Phylum: Chordata
- Class: Actinopterygii
- Order: Characiformes
- Family: Parodontidae
- Genus: Parodon; Valenciennes, 1850

Type species
- Parodon suborbitale Valenciennes, 1850

Synonyms
- Centrophorus Kner, 1859; Nematoparodon Fowler, 1943

= Parodon =

Genus of fishes

Parodon is a genus of freshwater ray-finned fishes belonging to the family Parodontidae, the scrapetooths. The fishes in this genus are from the tropical and subtropical Neotropics, their distribution extending as far south as the Río de la Plata.

== Taxonomy ==
Parodon was first proposed as a genus in 1850 by the French zoologist Achille Valenciennes in volume 22 of his and Georges Cuvier's Histoire naturelle des poissons. Valenciennes proposed it as a monospecific genus with Parodon suborbitalis as its only species, this species being the type species by monotypy. P. suborbitale was first formally described, as Parodon suborbitale, by Valenciennes in the same volume as he proposed the genus and its type locality was given as Lake Maracaibo in Venezuela. Parodon is the type genus of the family Parodontidae, the scrapetooths, which is classified within the suborder Characoidei of the order Characiformes.

== Etymology ==
Parodon is a combination of par, which means "even", and odon, which is a Latinised derivative of the Greek oudos, meaning "teeth". This is a reference to the cusps of the teeth of the type species all being even.

== Species ==
Parodon contains the following valid species:

- Parodon alfonsoi Londoño-Burbano, Román-Valencia & Taphorn, 2011
- Parodon apolinari G. S. Myers, 1930
- Parodon atratoensis Londoño-Burbano, Román-Valencia & Taphorn, 2011
- Parodon bifasciatus C. H. Eigenmann, 1912
- Parodon buckleyi Boulenger, 1887
- Parodon caliensis Boulenger, 1895
- Parodon carrikeri Fowler, 1940
- Parodon guyanensis Géry, 1959
- Parodon hilarii J. T. Reinhardt, 1867
- Parodon magdalenensis Londoño-Burbano, Román-Valencia & Taphorn, 2011
- Parodon moreirai Ingenito & Buckup, 2005
- Parodon nasus Kner, 1859
- Parodon orinocensis (Bonilla, Machado-Allison, Silvera, Chernoff, López & Lasso, 1999)
- Parodon pongoensis (W. R. Allen, 1942) (Pongo characin)
- Parodon suborbitalis Valenciennes, 1850

== Characteristics ==
Parodon scrapetooths are distinguished from other scrapetooths by the possession of small lateral teeth on the sides of their lower jaws; these are absent in the two other genera of scrapetooth, Apareiodon and Saccodon. Within the genus the spoecies were thought to be distinguishable by the shape of the teeth but the teeth of these fishes are small and weak, so are easily broken or missed. This has led to the misidentification of specimens and taxonomic uncertainty and instability. For Parodon the count of cusps on the teeth is now considered to be the most reliable feature to identify species as are the colour and pattern of the body and the types of teeth. These fishes vary in maximum length from 9.8 cm (3.9 in) in P. bifasciatus to 34 cm (13 in) in P. hilarii.

== Distribution ==
Parodon scrapetooths are found in the Neotropics in most of the drainage systems from Panama south to Argentina but they are not found in Bahia State, Brazil or Patagonia.
