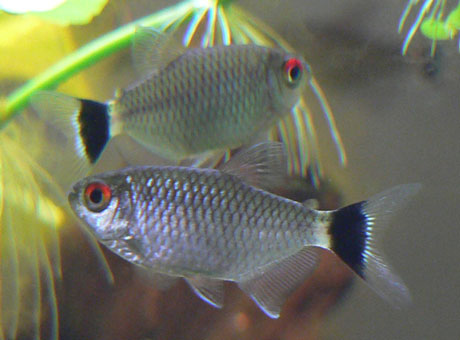

Conservation status
- Least Concern (IUCN 3.1)

Scientific classification
- Kingdom: Animalia
- Phylum: Chordata
- Class: Actinopterygii
- Order: Characiformes
- Family: Acestrorhamphidae
- Genus: Bario
- Species: B. sanctaefilomenae

Binomial name
- Bario sanctaefilomenae (Steindachner, 1907)

Synonyms
- Tetragonopterus sanctaefilomenae Steindachner, 1907; Moenkhausia sanctaefilomenae (Steindachner, 1907)

= Redeye tetra =

Species of fish

The redeye tetra (Bario sanctaefilomenae) is a species of freshwater ray-finned fish belonging to the family Acestrorhamphidae, the American characins. This fish is found in the São Francisco, upper Paraná, Paraguay and Uruguay River basins in eastern and central South America. This freshwater fish is commonly kept in aquariums and bred in large numbers at commercial facilities in Eastern Europe and Asia. The redeye tetra is one of the more popular aquarium fish due to their schooling capability.

It can grow up to 7 cm (2.8 in) in length, and live for approximately 5 years. The red-eye tetra has a bright silver body accented by a white-edged black basal half of the tail and a thin red circle around its eye. It is part of a group that consists of three similar species, the two others being B. forestii (upper Paraguay and upper Paraná basins) and B. oligolepis (Amazon and Paraguay basins, and the Guianas).

Yellow-banded tetra is another common name for B. sanctaefilomenae. The fish has a yellow band on its caudal peduncle, which differentiates it from the glass tetra.

== In the aquarium ==
Because of the redeye tetra's hardiness and ease of care, it is considered by aquarists to be an excellent beginner fish. It is readily available, peaceful, and suitable for most community aquariums, although it is quite active and may disturb slower, more timid species.

The redeye tetra is a schooling fish. For this reason, aquarists often keep it in groups of six or more. Although generally peaceful, some redeye tetras have been fin nippers on rare occasions, even when kept in groups. If kept alone, it is more likely to nip the fins of other fish. A fish tank with a volume of about 110 litres (29 US G.) is commonly used.

The species is frequently kept at temperatures of 23–28 °C (73–82 °F) in hard water (100–150 mg/L) with neutral pH (7.0), in a tank with plants around the sides and to the rear, and a clear area in the front. Redeyes are reported to be adaptable to a range of water conditions.

=== Nutrition ===
In the wild, the redeye tetra feeds on worms, insects, crustaceans and plant matter. In the aquarium, it generally eats all kinds of live, fresh, and flake foods. It can be fed both prepared foods and live foods in captivity.

=== Breeding ===
Females are larger and have a more rounded abdomen than males. When attempting to breed them, a separate breeding tank with slightly acidic, very soft water (4 dGH or below) is often used, with the tank densely planted. The redeye tetra is free spawning, but will also lay eggs among the roots of floating plants.

Once spawning has occurred, the mating pair are usually removed, as they will consume the eggs and hatchling fry. The eggs typically hatch one day after they are laid. Aquarists initially feed the fry with infusoria, rotifers, or commercially prepared fry foods, then freshly hatched brine shrimp, and eventually finely crushed flake foods.
