= Wanham =

Wanham may refer to:

- Wanham people, a historic ethnic group of Brazil
- Wanham language, an extinct language of Brazil
- Wanham, Alberta, a hamlet in Canada
