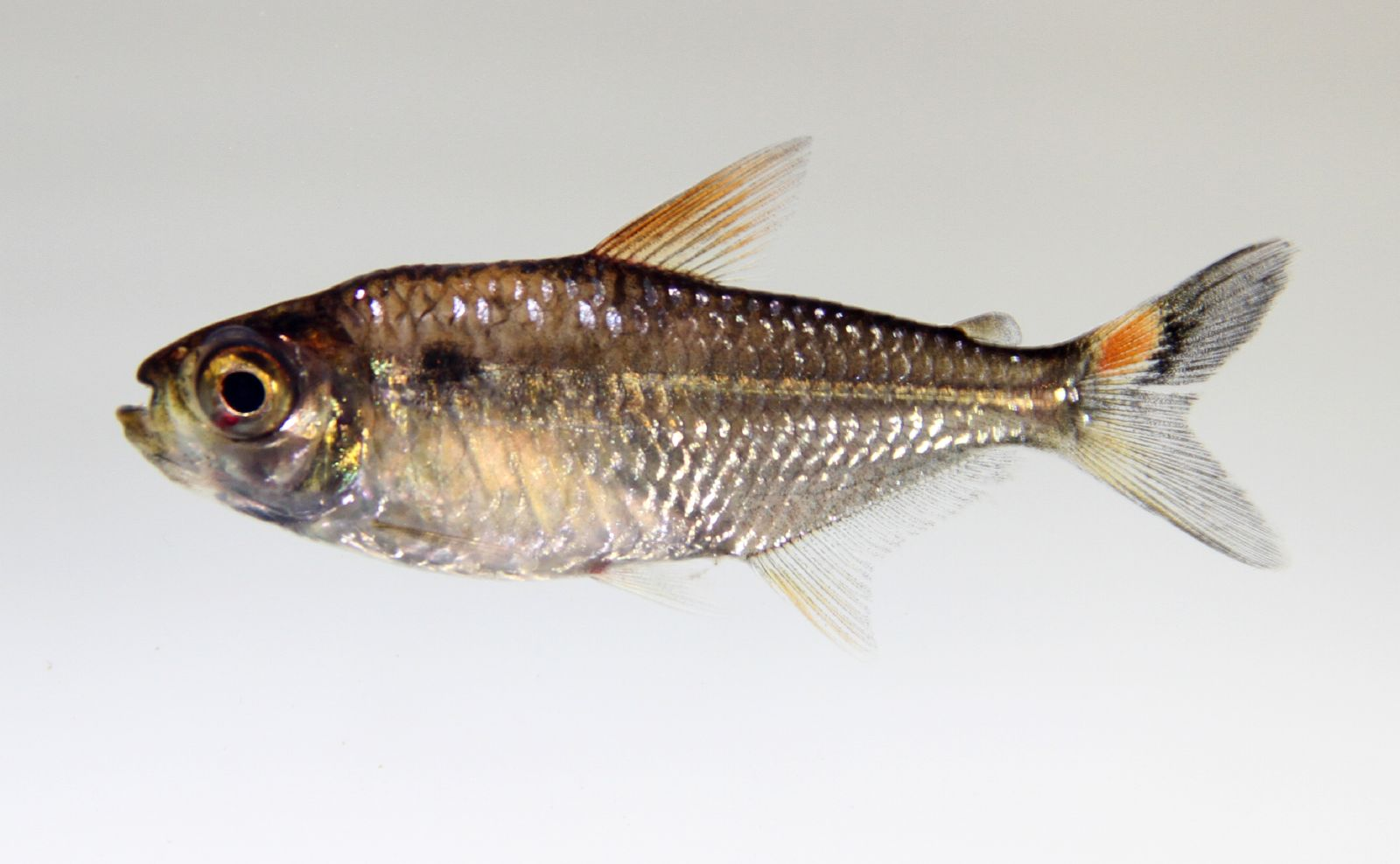
- Moenkhausia lepidura

Conservation status
- Least Concern (IUCN 3.1)

Scientific classification
- Kingdom: Animalia
- Phylum: Chordata
- Class: Actinopterygii
- Order: Characiformes
- Family: Acestrorhamphidae
- Genus: Moenkhausia
- Species: M. lepidura

Binomial name
- Moenkhausia lepidura (Kner, 1858)

Synonyms
- Tetragonopterus lepidurus Kner, 1858; Knodus calliurus Ahl, 1931; Gymnotichthys hildae Fernández-Yépez, 1950

= Moenkhausia lepidura =

Species of fish

Moenkhausia lepidura is a species of ray-finned fishes belonging to the family Acestrorhamphidae, the American characins. This species is found in the Amazon and Orinoco River basins. This species can reach the average length of 9 cm (3.5 in).
