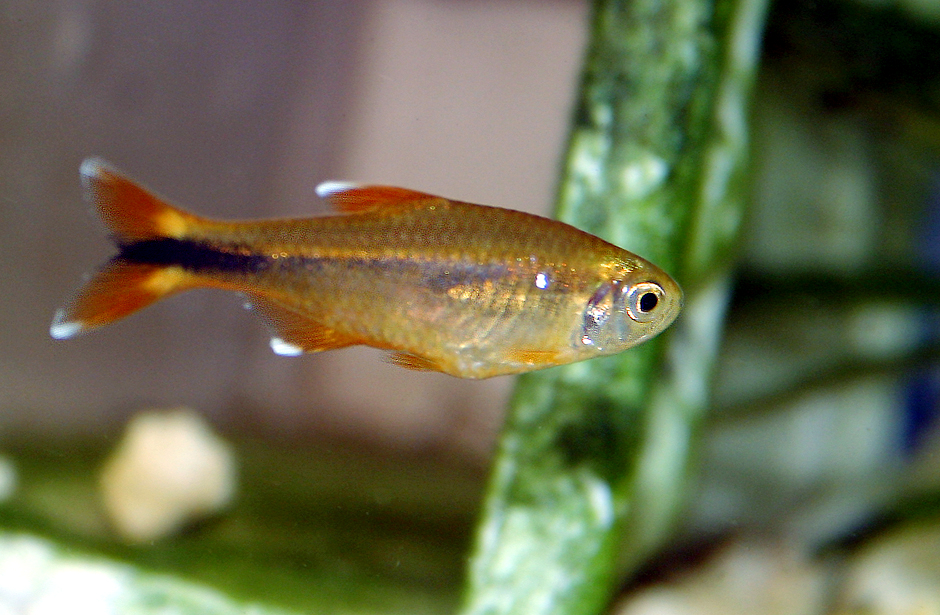
- Hasemania nana

Scientific classification
- Kingdom: Animalia
- Phylum: Chordata
- Class: Actinopterygii
- Order: Characiformes
- Family: Acestrorhamphidae
- Subfamily: Stichonodontinae
- Genus: Hasemania; Ellis, 1911

Type species
- Hasemania melanura Ellis, 1911

Synonyms
- Pristicharax Fowler, 1949

= Hasemania =

Genus of fishes

Hasemania is a genus of freshwater ray-finned fishes belonging to the family Acestrorhamphidae, the American characins. The species in this genus are endemic to Brazil, where only found in river basins that originate on the Brazilian Shield, ranging west to the Juruena system, north to the São Francisco system and south to the Paraná system. The individual species generally have quite small ranges and two, H. crenuchoides and H. piatan, are considered threatened by Brazil's Ministry of the Environment.

They are small fish, up to 2.7–7 cm (1.1–2.8 in) in standard length depending on the exact species.

The genus is named for zoologist and explorer John Diederich Haseman. He collected all of the known species of this genus at the time of description.

== Species ==
Hasemania contains the following valid species:

- Hasemania diastatos (Dagosta, Marinho & Camelier, 2014)
- Hasemania hanseni (Fowler, 1949)
- Hasemania maxillaris Ellis, 1911
- Hasemania melanura Ellis, 1911 (Copper tetra)
- Hasemania nana (Lütken, 1875) (Silvertip tetra)
- Hasemania negodagua (Lima & Gerhard, 2001)
- Hasemania piatan Zanata & J. P. Serra, 2010
