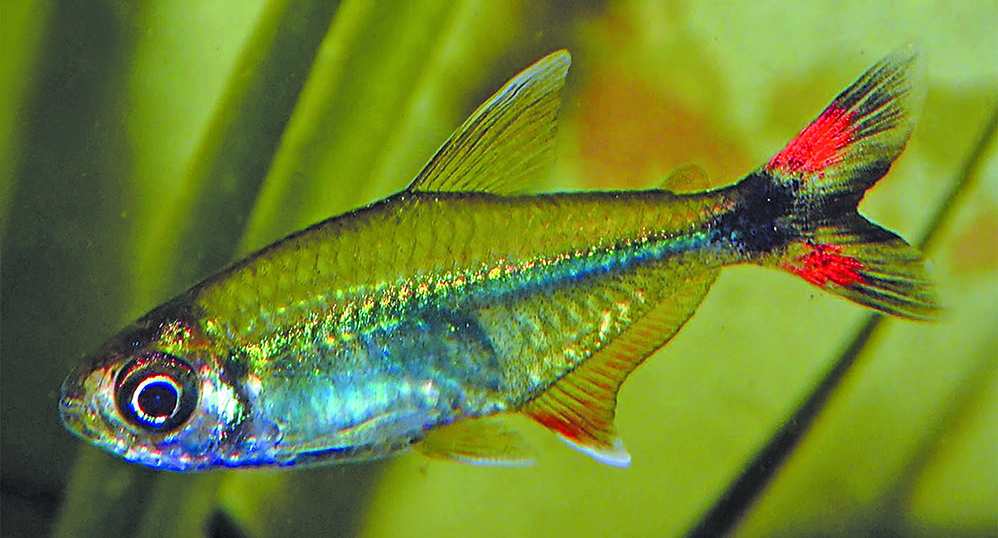

Conservation status
- Least Concern (IUCN 3.1)

Scientific classification
- Kingdom: Animalia
- Phylum: Chordata
- Class: Actinopterygii
- Order: Characiformes
- Family: Acestrorhamphidae
- Genus: Moenkhausia
- Species: M. bonita

Binomial name
- Moenkhausia bonita Benine, Castro & Sabino, 2004

= Moenkhausia bonita =

Species of fish

Moenkhausia bonita, the flagtail tetra or blackbird tetra, is a species of freshwater ray-finned fish belonging to the family Acestrorhamphidae, the American characins. This species is found in South America.

== Taxonomy ==
Moenkhausia bonita was first formally described in 2004 by the Brazilian ichthyologists Ricardo Cardoso Benine, Ricardo Macedo Corrêa e Castro and José Sabino, with its type locality given as the rio Baía Bonita at 21°09'S, 56°25'W, Parque Baía Bonita, "Aguáio Natural", upper Rio Miranda, Rio Paraguay basin, Mato Grosso do Sul in southwestern Brazil. This species is classified within the genus Moenkhausia, which is classified within the subfamily Stichonodontinae of the American tetra family Acestrorhamphidae. This family belongs to the suborder Characoidei of the order Characiformes.

== Etymology ==
Moenkhausia bonita is classified in the genus Moenkhausia, a name which honours William J. Moenkhaus, an American geneticist and ichthyologist who was a colleague of Eigenmann's at Indiana University. The specific name refers to the type locality, the rio Baía Bonita.

== Description ==
Moenkhausia bonita has a maximum standard length of 8.5 cm (3.3 in) and a maximum published weight of 7.7 cm (3.0 in). It differs from most of its congeners, apart from M. intermedia and M. dichroura, in possessing a black rear edge to each lobe of the caudal fin and having a black lozenge-shaped blotch on the caudal peduncle that reaches to the rear of the middle fin rays of the caudal fin. It differs from M. intermedia and M. dichroura in the count and length of its gill rakers.

== Distribution and habitat ==
Moenkhausia bonita is found in South America, where it occurs in the basins of the Bermejo, Paraná, Paraguay, and Uruguay river basins in Argentina, Bolivia, Brazil, Paraguay and Uruguay. The type series was collected from a black water stream with a very slow flow from depths to 1 m (3 ft 3 in). This fish appears to be mainly found close to the surface in schools from 10 to 30 individuals.

== Biology ==
Moenkhausia bonita has been observed, with limited examination of stomach contents seeming to confirm the observations, feeding on terrestrial insects picked off the surface or collected while drifting. It is most active in the morning and late afternoon.
