= Rineloricaria hasemani =

Conservation status
- Data Deficient (IUCN 3.1)

Scientific classification
- Kingdom: Animalia
- Phylum: Chordata
- Class: Actinopterygii
- Order: Siluriformes
- Family: Loricariidae
- Genus: Rineloricaria
- Species: R. hasemani

Binomial name
- Rineloricaria hasemani Isbrücker & Nijssen, 1979

Synonyms
- Hemiloricaria hasemani (Isbrücker & Nijssen 1979)

Species of catfish

Rineloricaria hasemani is a species of freshwater ray-finned fish belonging to the family Loricariidae, the suckermouth armored catfishes, and the subfamily Loricariinae, the mailed catfishes. This catfish occurs in the lower Amazon River, in the Guamá drainage basin, in the vicinity of Belém. This species reaches a standard length of 19.8 cm (7.8 in) and is believed to be a facultative air-breather.

Rineloricaria hasemani appears in the aquarium trade, where it is typically referred to as Haseman's whip-tailed catfish.

It is named for zoologist and explorer John Diederich Haseman of the Carnegie Museum of Natural History who gathered a collection of South American fishes in 1908*1911 which included the holotype of this species.
