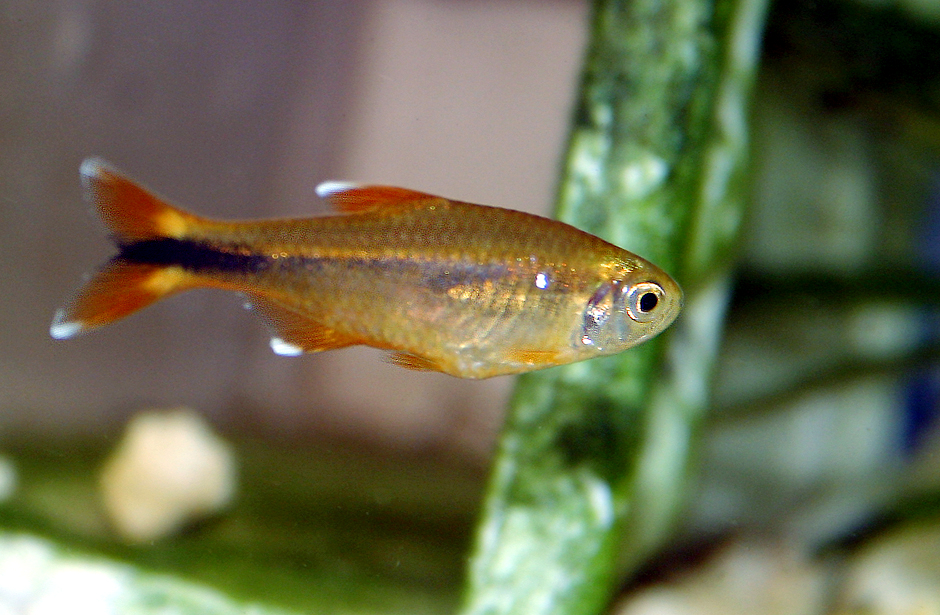

Conservation status
- Least Concern (IUCN 3.1)

Scientific classification
- Kingdom: Animalia
- Phylum: Chordata
- Class: Actinopterygii
- Order: Characiformes
- Family: Acestrorhamphidae
- Genus: Hasemania
- Species: H. nana

Binomial name
- Hasemania nana (Lütken, 1875)

Synonyms
- Tetragonopterus nanus Lütken, 1875; Hasemania marginata Meinken, 1938

= Silvertip tetra =

Species of fish

The silvertip tetra (Hasemania nana) is a species of ray-finned fishes belonging to the family Acestrorhamphidae, the American characins. This species is an omnivore which is restricted to streams and creeks in the São Francisco basin in Brazil, but is frequently kept in aquariums.

== Description ==
The silvertip tetra is a small fish which reaches up to 5 cm (2.0 in) in standard length. The tetras are transparent with a gold color, and have a black stripe that runs along the middle to back section of their bodies. The males have brighters colors compared to the paler females. They are a social species that can become territorial. They usually enjoy being with a school of their own kind.

The fish thrive in temperatures that range from 72 to 82 °F (22 to 28 °C). They live in slightly acidic waters that range from a pH of 6.0 to 8.0. They are common to find in pet stores and are relatively easy to care for. They can be affected by parasites and infections.

When they are preparing to breed, the male will be brightly colored while the female will be swollen. When they breed, the female scatters the eggs among vegetation while the male fertilizes them. The species has been known to eat their own eggs. The eggs hatch after one and a half days.

The genome was fully sequenced in 2013, by standard PCR, and found to be 16,581 base pairs long.
