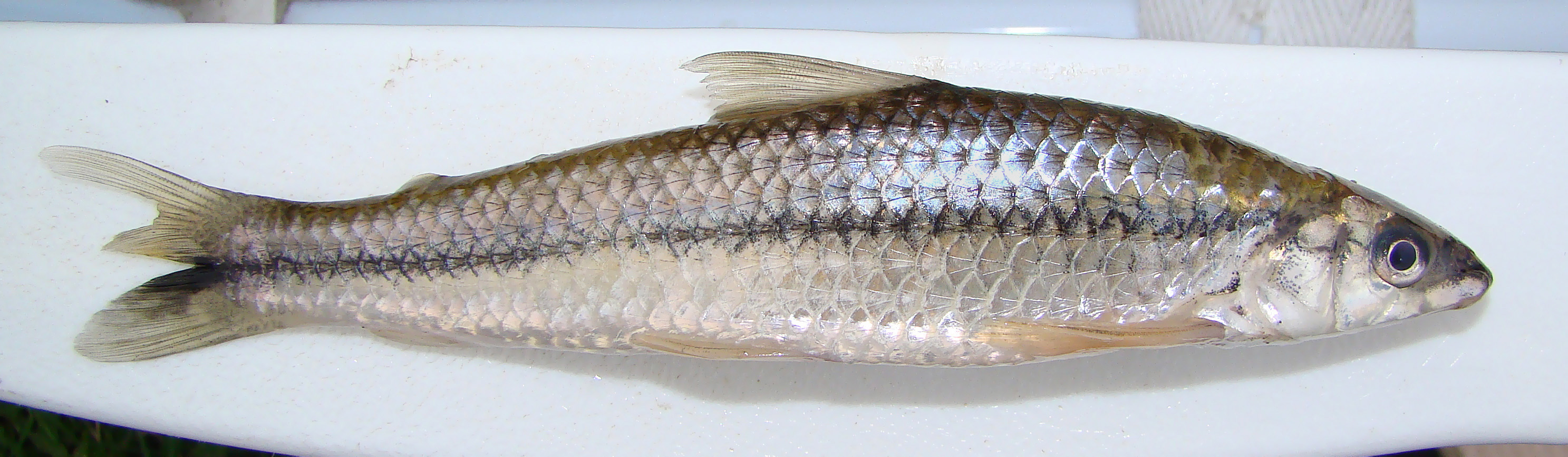

Conservation status
- Least Concern (IUCN 3.1)

Scientific classification
- Kingdom: Animalia
- Phylum: Chordata
- Class: Actinopterygii
- Order: Characiformes
- Family: Parodontidae
- Genus: Apareiodon
- Species: A. affinis

Binomial name
- Apareiodon affinis (Steindachner, 1879)

Synonyms
- Paradon affinis Steindachner, 1879; Parodon paraguayensis C. H. Eigenmann, 1907

= Apareiodon affinis =

Species of fish

Apareiodon affinis, the darter characine, is a species of fresh water ray-finned fish belonging to the family Parodontidae, the scrapetooths. These fishes are found in the Río de la Plata Basin in southern Brazil, Paraguay and northern Argentina.

== Taxonomy ==
Apareiodon affinis was first formally described as Paradon affinis in 1879 by the Austrian ichthyologist Franz Steindachner, with its type locality given as La Plata in Buenos Aires Province in Argentina. In 1916, Carl H. Eigenmann proposed the new genus Apareiodon, with Parodon piracicabae designated as the type species. This species was subsequently reclassified into Apareidon. The genus Apareidon is classified in the family Parodontidae, which is within the suborder Characoidei of the order Characiformes.

== Description ==
The darter characine is a small, fusiform fish growing to a maximum length of 14.3 cm (5.6 in). Like other characids, it has a mouth on the underside of the head with a poorly developed upper lip. There are no dentary teeth, and the pectoral fins have a single, unbranched fin-ray which the fish uses to prop itself up on the substrate.

== Ecology ==
The darter characine is an open water fish, and was one of several fish species in a reservoir on the Paraná River to thrive when large submerged macrophytes were removed. The diet consists of diatoms, green algae and the periderm of aquatic vegetation, perhaps removed accidentally while the fish scrapes off the algae.

The karyotype of this fish varies between populations. In the Upper Paraná basin, the sexes have distinct diploid numbers, the males showing 2n = 54 and the females 2n = 55. They have a multifactorial ZW sex-determination system where the female is determined by ZW_{1}W_{2} and the male by ZZ. In the separate Cuiabá River system, all individuals show 2n = 54. This is a non-migratory species. Its reproductive strategy involves external fertilisation and a lack of parental care of eggs or young.
