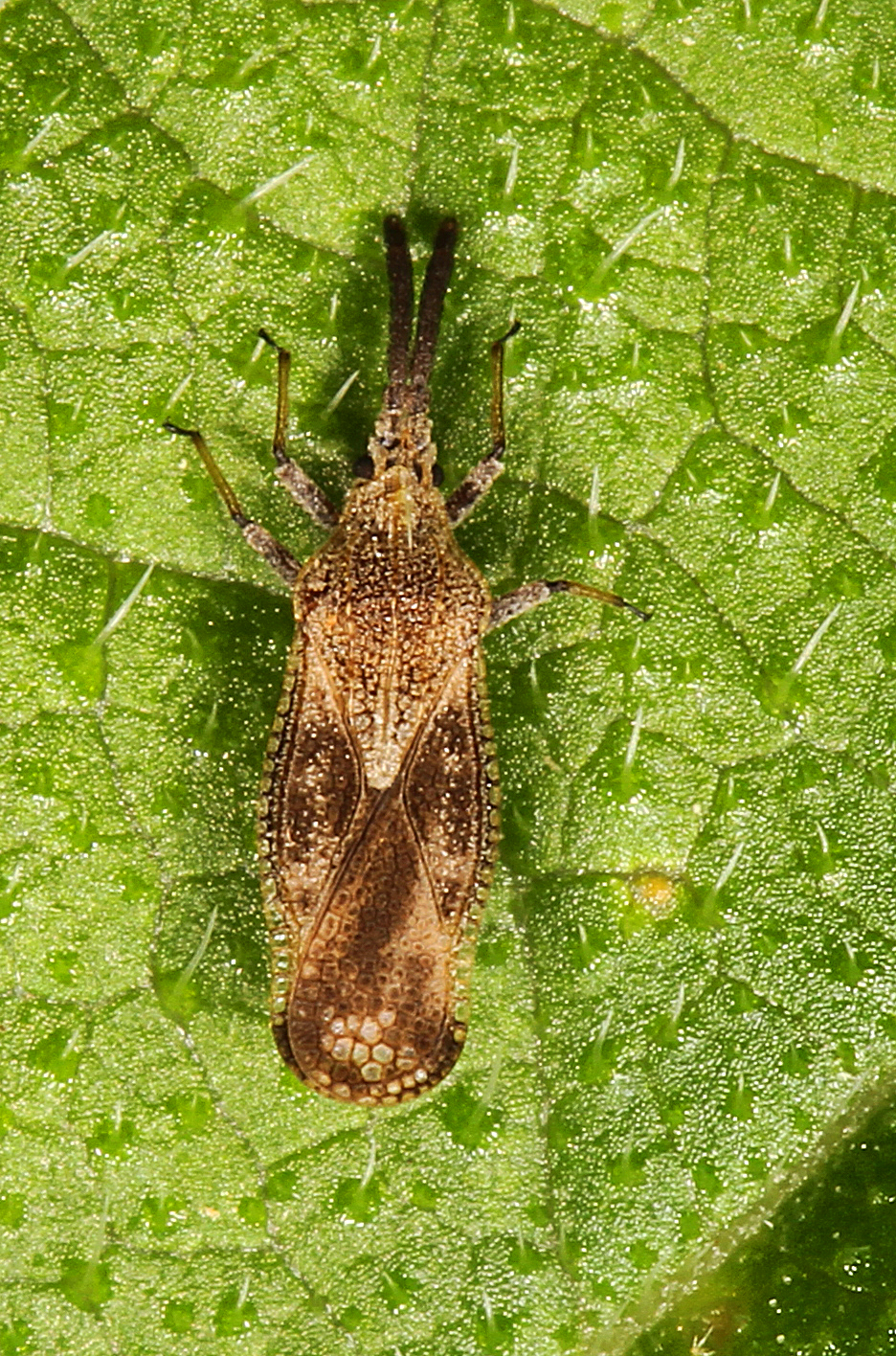

Scientific classification
- Domain: Eukaryota
- Kingdom: Animalia
- Phylum: Arthropoda
- Class: Insecta
- Order: Hemiptera
- Suborder: Heteroptera
- Family: Tingidae
- Genus: Teleonemia
- Species: T. scrupulosa

Binomial name
- Teleonemia scrupulosa Stal, 1873

= Teleonemia scrupulosa =

Species of true bug

Teleonemia scrupulosa, the lantana lace bug, is a species of lace bug in the family Tingidae. It is found in Africa, Australia, the Caribbean, Central America, North America, Oceania, South America, and Southern Asia, though it may be introduced to some of these locations.

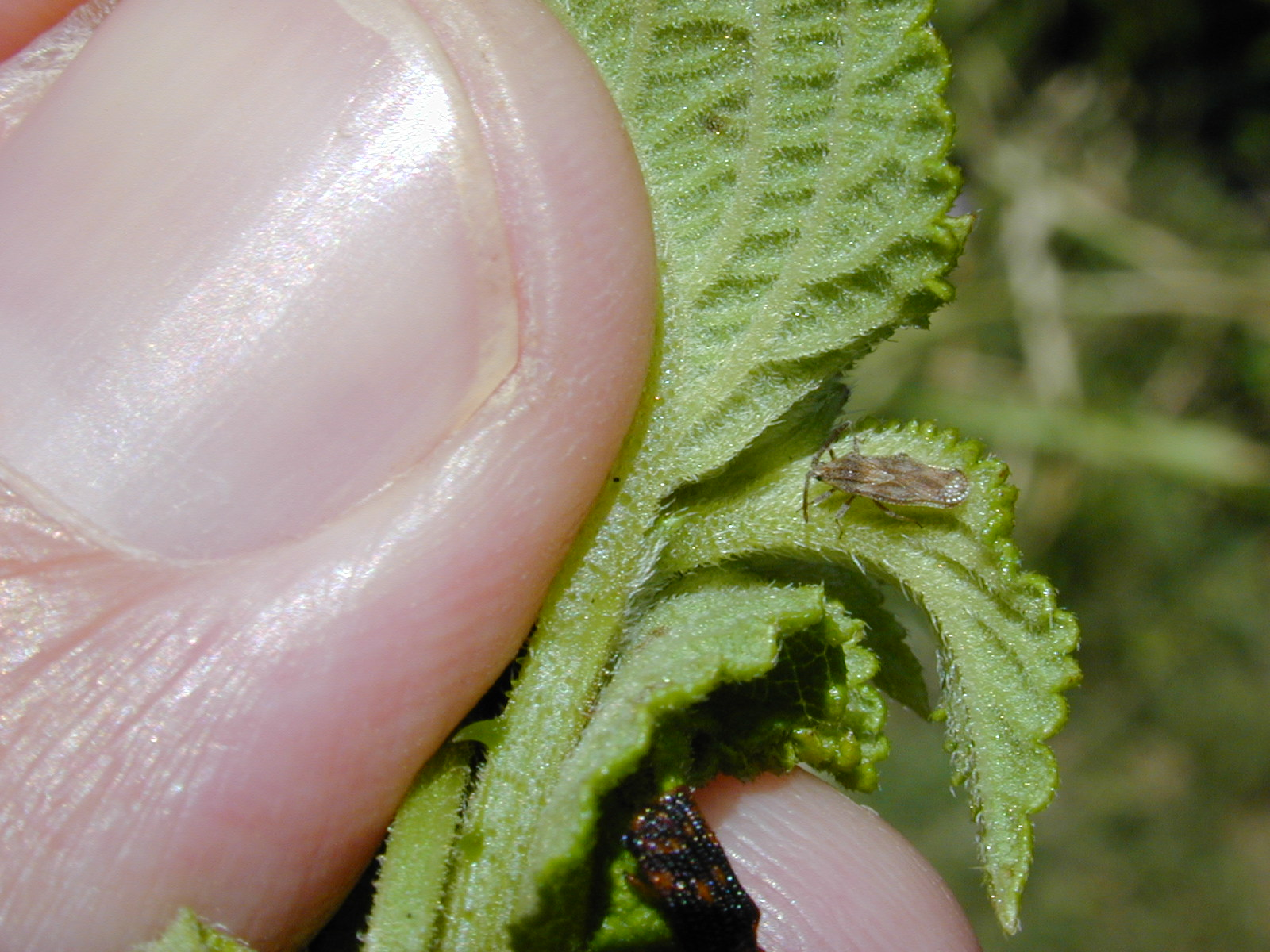

== Subspecies ==
- Teleonemia scrupulosa haytiensis Drake, 1920
- Teleonemia scrupulosa scrupulosa Stål, 1873
