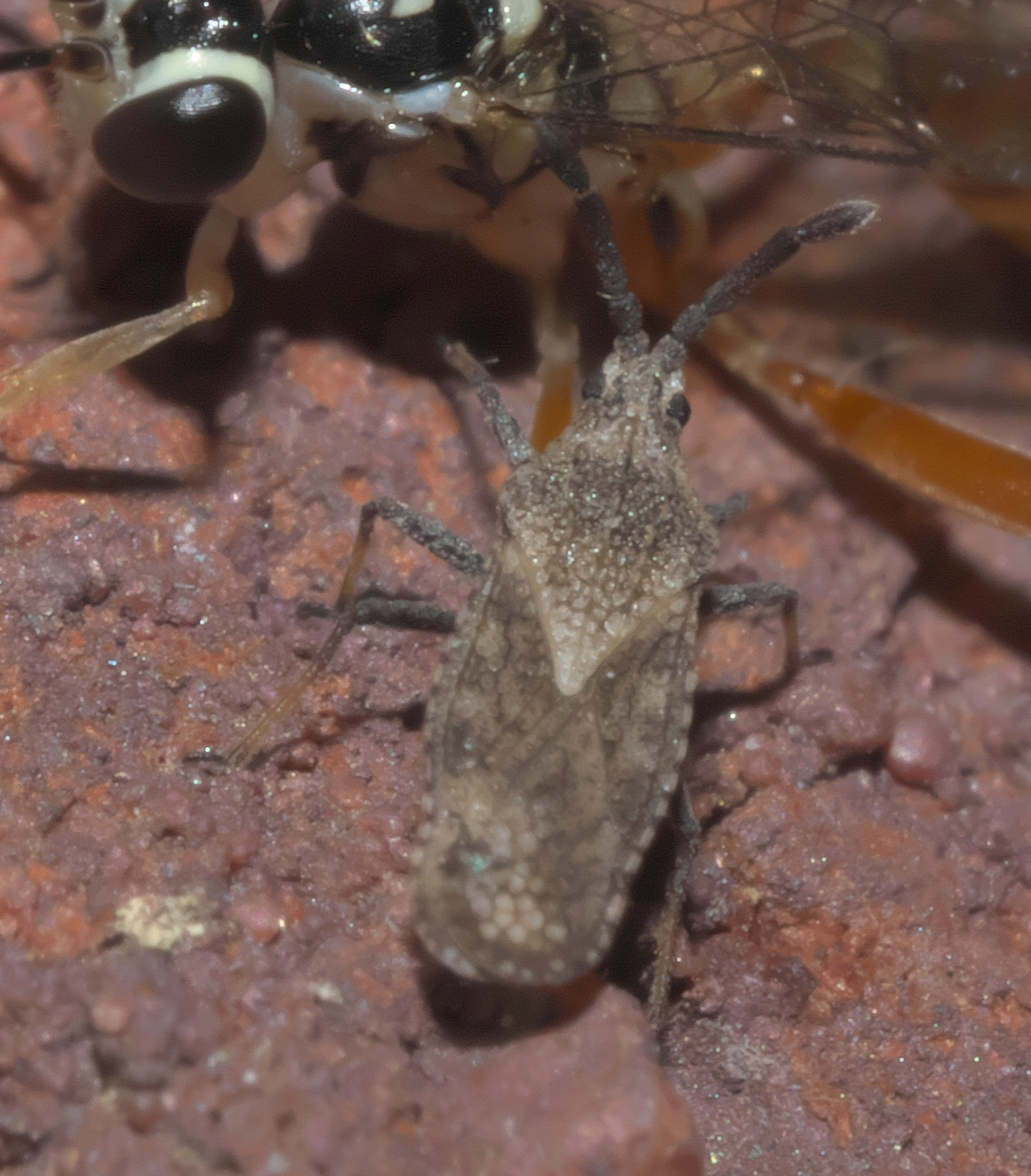

Scientific classification
- Domain: Eukaryota
- Kingdom: Animalia
- Phylum: Arthropoda
- Class: Insecta
- Order: Hemiptera
- Suborder: Heteroptera
- Family: Tingidae
- Tribe: Tingini
- Genus: Teleonemia
- Species: T. nigrina

Binomial name
- Teleonemia nigrina Champion, 1898

= Teleonemia nigrina =

Species of true bug

Teleonemia nigrina is a species of lace bug in the family Tingidae. It is found in Central America and North America.
