= Teleonemia montivaga =

Scientific classification
- Domain: Eukaryota
- Kingdom: Animalia
- Phylum: Arthropoda
- Class: Insecta
- Order: Hemiptera
- Suborder: Heteroptera
- Family: Tingidae
- Tribe: Tingini
- Genus: Teleonemia
- Species: T. montivaga

Binomial name
- Teleonemia montivaga Drake, 1920

Species of true bug

Teleonemia montivaga is a species of lace bug in the family Tingidae. It is found in North America.
