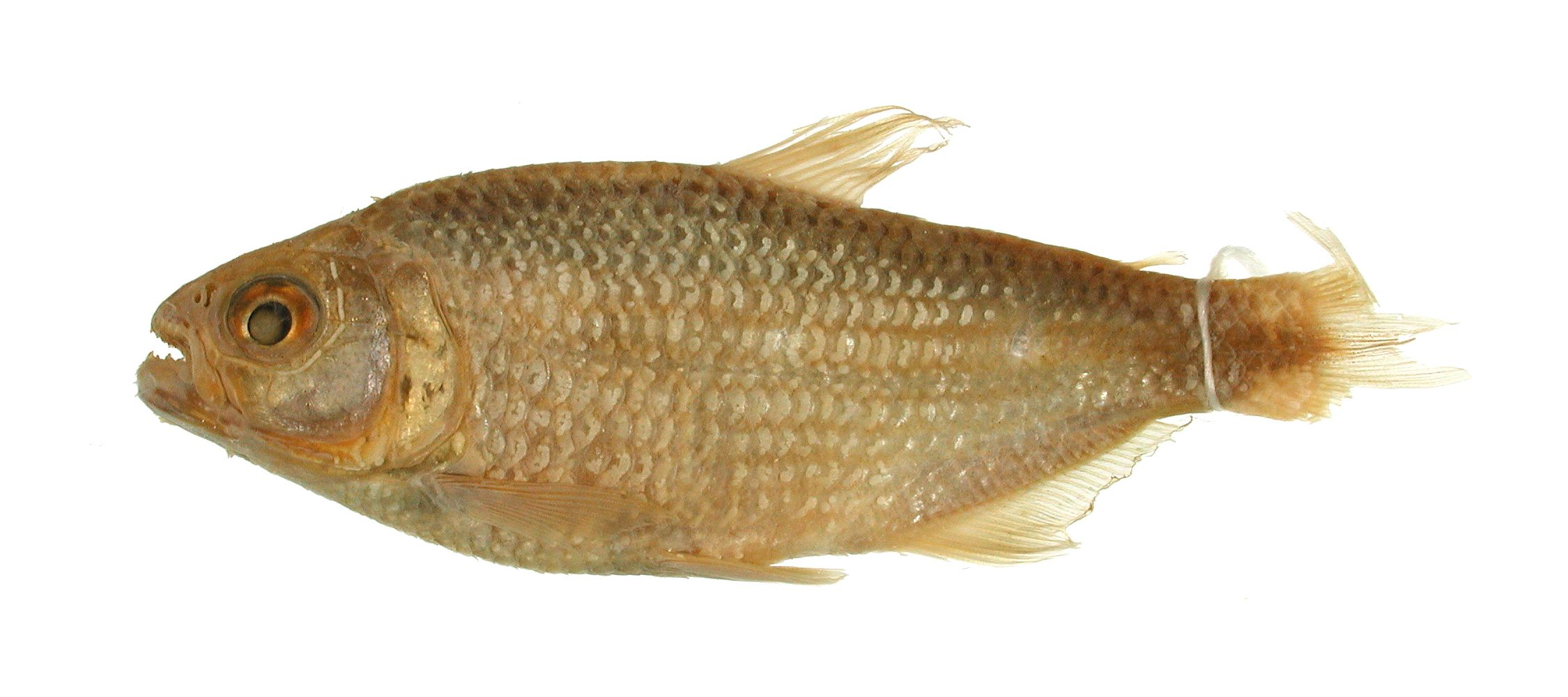

Scientific classification
- Kingdom: Animalia
- Phylum: Chordata
- Class: Actinopterygii
- Order: Characiformes
- Family: Acestrorhamphidae
- Genus: Bario; G. S. Myers, 1940
- Species: B. steindachneri

Binomial name
- Bario steindachneri (C. H. Eigenmann, 1893)

Synonyms
- Tetragonopterus steindachneri C. H. Eigenmann, 1893; Tetragonopterus lineatus Steindachner, 1891

= Bario steindachneri =

Species of fish

Bario steindachneri is a species of freshwater ray-finned fish belonging to the family Acestrorhamphidae, the American characins, from Brazil and Peru. It is found in a freshwater environment within a pelagic depth range in a tropical climate.

Bario steindachneri can reach the maximum recorded length of about 9 cm (3.5 in) as an unsexed male. It is found in the Amazon River basin of South America.

The fish is named in honor of Austrian ichthyologist Franz Steindachner (1834–1919), who originally described this species in 1891 but unwittingly used a name that already been used.
