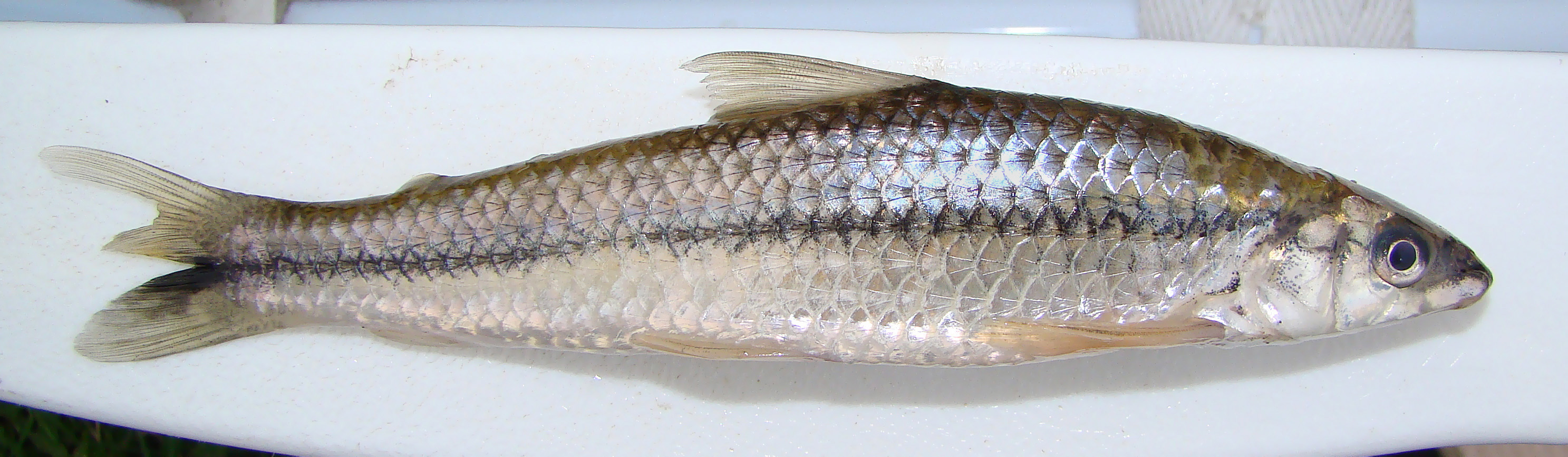
- Apareiodon affinis

Scientific classification
- Kingdom: Animalia
- Phylum: Chordata
- Class: Actinopterygii
- Order: Characiformes
- Suborder: Characoidei
- Family: Parodontidae; C. H. Eigenmann, 1910

Genera
- see text

= Parodontidae =

Family of fishes

The Parodontidae, the scrapetooths, are a family of fresh water ray-finned fish belonging to the order Characiformes. The fish in this family are rheophilic and are specialised for feeding by scraping algae off rocks. The fish in this family are found in the tropical and subtropical Neotropics.

== Taxonomy ==
Parodontidae was first proposed as the Parodontinae, a subfamily of the family Characidae, in 1910 by the American ichthyologist Carl H. Eigenmann with Parodon as its type genus. Parodon was first proposed as a genus in 1850 by the French zoologist Achille Valenciennes in volume 22 of his and Georges Cuvier's Histoire naturelle des poissons. Valenciennes proposed it as a monospecific genus with Parodon suborbitalis as its only species, this species being the type species by monotypy. P. suborbitale was first formally described, as Parodon suborbitale, by Valenciennes in the same volume as he proposed the genus and its type locality was given as Lake Maracaibo in Venezuela. This taxon has also been regarded as a subfamily of the family Hemiodontidae, but is now considered to be a valid family within the suborder Characoidei of the order Characiformes.

== Genera ==
Parodontidae has the following genera classified within it:

- Apareiodon C. H. Eigenmann, 1916
- Parodon Valenciennes, 1850
- Saccodon Kner, 1863

== Etymology ==
Parodontidae takes its name from its type genus Parodon, a name which is a combination of par, which means "even", and odon, which is a Latinised derivative of the Greek oudos, meaning "teeth". This is a reference to the cusps of the teeth of the type species all being even.

== Characteristics ==
Parodontidae is a distinctive taxon within the Characoidei and is characterised by a number of features shared between its members and distinct from sister taxa. These include the possession of jaws which are specialised for scraping algae off rocks, an upper jaw which can be extended and an elaborate system to replace lost teeth. The males also differ from females in the size and shape of the anterior ribs and in the size of the swin bladder, apparently an adaptation to generate sound. In addition these fishes have comparatively large, longitudinally oriented pectoral fins which are supported by a pectoral girdle with enlarged cleithrum and postcleithrum.

== Distribution and habitat ==
Parodontidae are found in the tropical and subtropical Neotropics from eastern Panama south to the drainage basin of the Río de la Plata. They are rheophilic fishes typically found in streams with swift currents and rock substrates.
