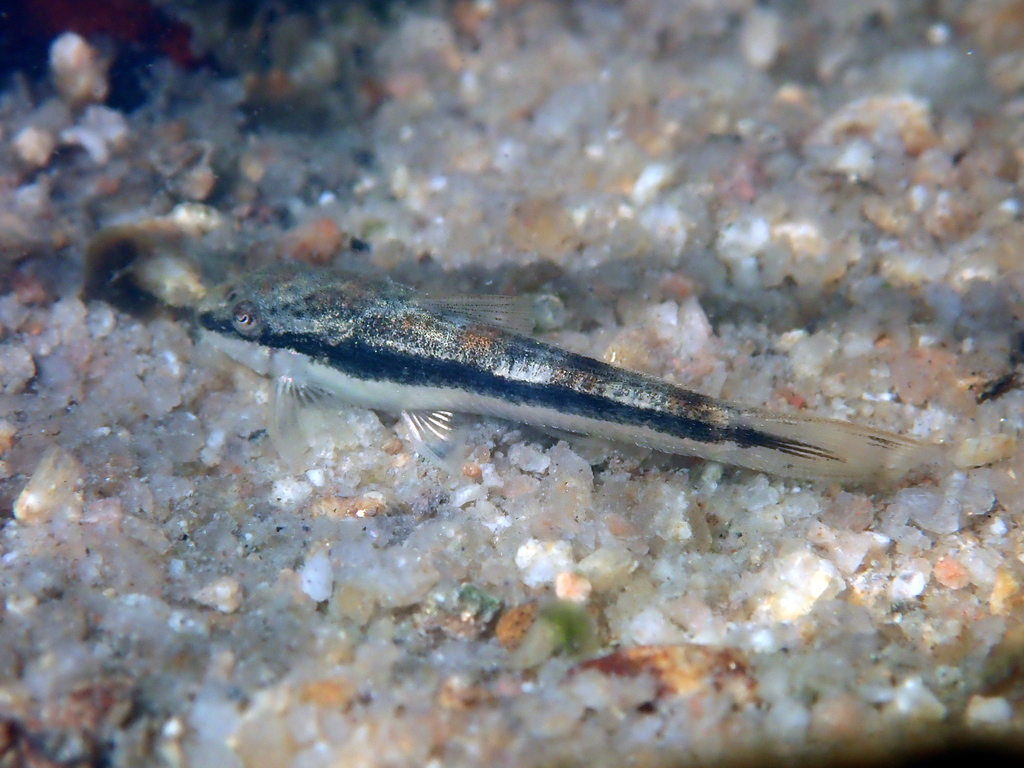

Conservation status
- Least Concern (IUCN 3.1)

Scientific classification
- Kingdom: Animalia
- Phylum: Chordata
- Class: Actinopterygii
- Order: Siluriformes
- Family: Loricariidae
- Genus: Otocinclus
- Species: O. hasemani

Binomial name
- Otocinclus hasemani Steindachner, 1915

= Otocinclus hasemani =

Species of fish

Otocinclus hasemani is a species of freshwater ray-finned fish belonging to the family Loricariidae, the suckermouth armored catfishes, and the subfamily Hypoptopomatinae, the cascudinhos. This catfish is found in South America, where it is found in the Tocantins and Parnaiba river basins in the Brazilian states of Goiás, Maranhão, Pará, Piauí and Tocantins. The species reaches a standard length of 2.7 cm (1.1 in).

It is named for zoologist and explorer John Diederich Haseman, the collector of the holotype.
