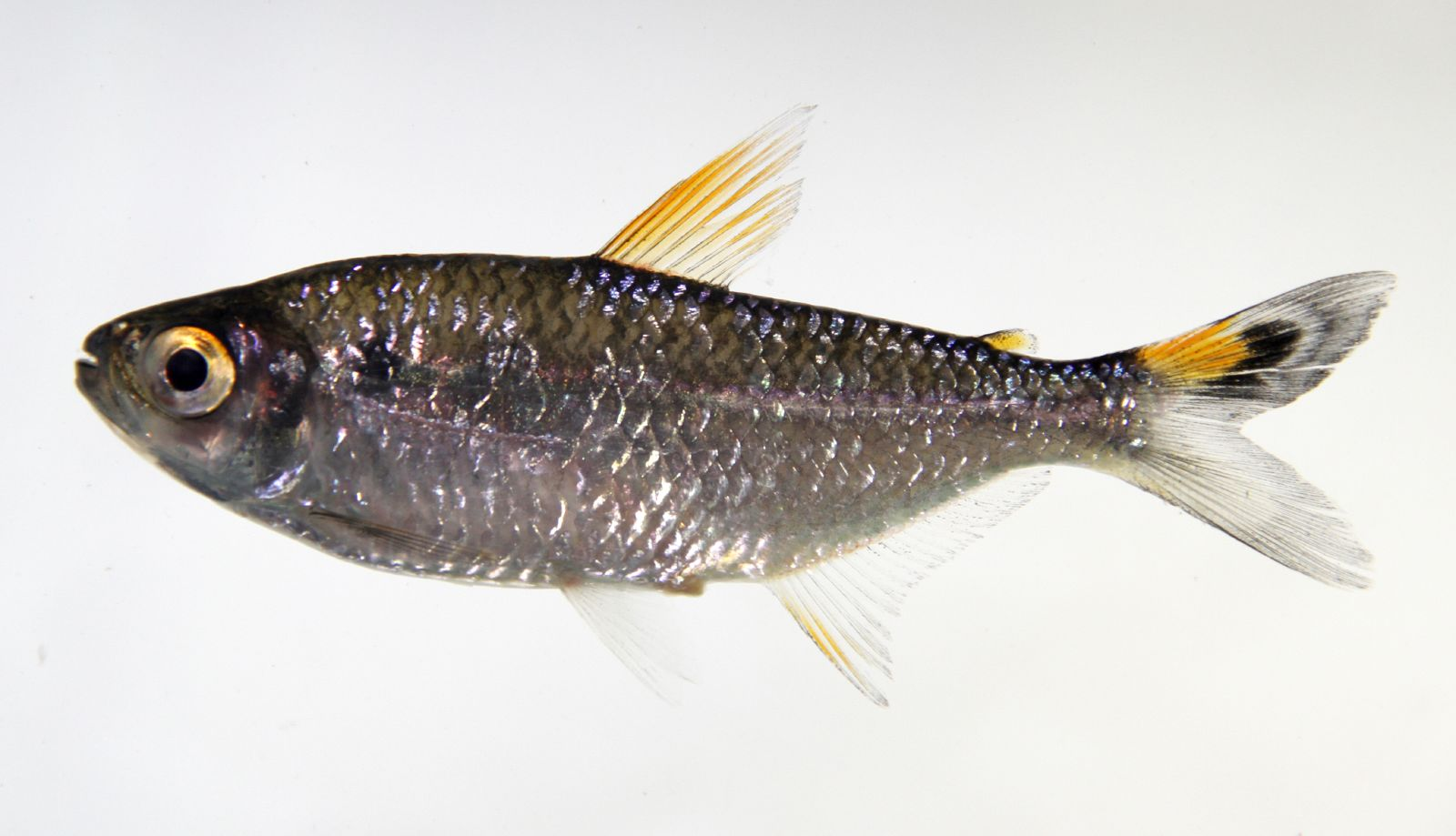
- Moenkhausia lepidura

Scientific classification
- Kingdom: Animalia
- Phylum: Chordata
- Class: Actinopterygii
- Order: Characiformes
- Family: Acestrorhamphidae
- Subfamily: Stichonodontinae
- Genus: Moenkhausia; C. H. Eigenmann, 1903

Type species
- Tetragonopterus xinguensis Steindachner, 1882

Synonyms
- Gymnotichthys Fernández-Yépez, 1950

= Moenkhausia =

Genus of fishes

Moenkhausia is a genus of freshwater ray-finned fishes belonging to the family Acestrorhamphidae, the American characins. They are found in tropical and subtropical South America and are medium-sized tetras, where the largest species only reach around 12 cm (4.7 in).

== Species ==
Currently, 84 recognized species are placed in this genus:

- Moenkhausia abyss G. D. Oliveira & Marinho, 2016
- Moenkhausia affinis Steindachner, 1915
- Moenkhausia agnesae Géry, 1965
- Moenkhausia alesis Petrolli & Benine, 2015
- Moenkhausia andrica Reia, C. Oliveira & Benine, 2021
- Moenkhausia atahualpiana (Fowler, 1907)
- Moenkhausia aurantia Bertaco, Jerep & F. R. Carvalho 2011
- Moenkhausia aurora Reia, Silva, C. Oliveira & Benine, 2024
- Moenkhausia barbouri C. H. Eigenmann, 1908
- Moenkhausia bellasomniosa Soares, F. C. T. Lima, Bastos & Rapp Py-Daniel, 2019
- Moenkhausia beninei F. C. T. Lima & Soares, 2018
- Moenkhausia bonita Benine, Castro & Sabino, 2004
- Moenkhausia britskii Azevedo-Santos & Benine, 2016
- Moenkhausia browni C. H. Eigenmann, 1909
- Moenkhausia cambacica Marinho, Ohara & Dagosta, 2021
- Moenkhausia celibela Marinho & Langeani, 2010
- Moenkhausia ceros C. H. Eigenmann, 1908
- Moenkhausia chlorophthalma Sousa, Netto-Ferreira & Birindelli, 2010
- Moenkhausia chrysargyrea (Günther, 1864)
- Moenkhausia comma C. H. Eigenmann, 1908
- Moenkhausia conspicua Soares & Bührnheim, 2016
- Moenkhausia costae (Steindachner, 1907)
- Moenkhausia cotinho C. H. Eigenmann, 1908
- Moenkhausia crisnejas Pearson, 1929
- Moenkhausia dasalmas Bertaco, Jerep & Carvalho, 2011
- Moenkhausia diamantina Benine, Castro & Santos, 2007
- Moenkhausia dichroura (Kner, 1858)
- Moenkhausia dorsinuda Zarske & Géry, 2002
- Moenkhausia eurystaenia Marinho, 2010
- Moenkhausia forestii Benine, Mariguela & Oliveira, 2009
- Moenkhausia gracilima C. H. Eigenmann, 1908
- Moenkhausia grandisquamis (Müller & Troschel, 1845)
- Moenkhausia guaruba A. Lima, Vita, Dutra, Ohara & Pastana, 2023
- Moenkhausia hasemani C. H. Eigenmann, 1917
- Moenkhausia heikoi Géry & Zarske, 2004
- Moenkhausia hemigrammoides Géry, 1965
- Moenkhausia hysterosticta Lucinda, Malabarba & Benine, 2007
- Moenkhausia icae C. H. Eigenmann, 1908
- Moenkhausia inrai Géry, 1992
- Moenkhausia intermedia C. H. Eigenmann, 1908
- Moenkhausia iris Marinho & Dagosta, 2023
- Moenkhausia ischyognatha Petrolli & Benine, 2015
- Moenkhausia jamesi C. H. Eigenmann, 1908
- Moenkhausia justae C. H. Eigenmann, 1908
- Moenkhausia latissima C. H. Eigenmann, 1908
- Moenkhausia lata C. H. Eigenmann, 1908
- Moenkhausia lepidura (Kner, 1858)
- Moenkhausia levidorsa Benine, 2002
- Moenkhausia lopesi Britski & de Silimon, 2001
- Moenkhausia loweae Géry, 1992
- Moenkhausia madeirae Fowler, 1913
- Moenkhausia margitae Zarske & Géry, 2001
- Moenkhausia megalops (C. H. Eigenmann, 1907)
- Moenkhausia metae C. H. Eigenmann, 1922
- Moenkhausia miangi Steindachner, 1915
- Moenkhausia mikia Marinho & Langeani, 2010
- Moenkhausia moisae Géry, Planquette & Le Bail, 1995
- Moenkhausia monicae Marinho, Dagosta, Camelier & F. C. T. Lima, 2016
- Moenkhausia mutum Dagosta & Marinho, 2016
- Moenkhausia naponis Böhlke, 1958
- Moenkhausia newtoni Travassos, 1964
- Moenkhausia nigromarginata Costa, 1994
- Moenkhausia orteguasae Fowler, 1943
- Moenkhausia ovalis (Günther, 1868)
- Moenkhausia pankilopteryx Bertaco & Lucinda, 2006
- Moenkhausia parecis Ohara & Marinho, 2016
- Moenkhausia petymbuaba Lima & Birindelli, 2006
- Moenkhausia phaeonota Fink, 1979
- Moenkhausia pirahan Mathubara & Toledo-Piza, 2020
- Moenkhausia plumbea Sousa, Netto-Ferreira & Birindelli, 2010
- Moenkhausia restricta Soares & Benine, 2019
- Moenkhausia robertsi Géry, 1964
- Moenkhausia rondoni Mathubara & Toledo-Piza, 2020
- Moenkhausia rubra Pastana & Dagosta, 2014
- Moenkhausia schultzi Fernández-Yépez, 1950
- Moenkhausia shideleri C. H. Eigenmann, 1909
- Moenkhausia simulata (C. H. Eigenmann, 1924)
- Moenkhausia solaris Silva, Santana & Marinho, 2025
- Moenkhausia sthenosthoma Petrolli & Benine, 2015
- Moenkhausia surinamensis Géry, 1965
- Moenkhausia tergimacula C. A. S. Lucena & Z. M. S. Lucena, 1999
- Moenkhausia venerei Petrolli, Azevedo-Santos & Benine, 2016
- Moenkhausia vittata (Castelnau, 1855)
- Moenkhausia xinguensis (Steindachner, 1882)
