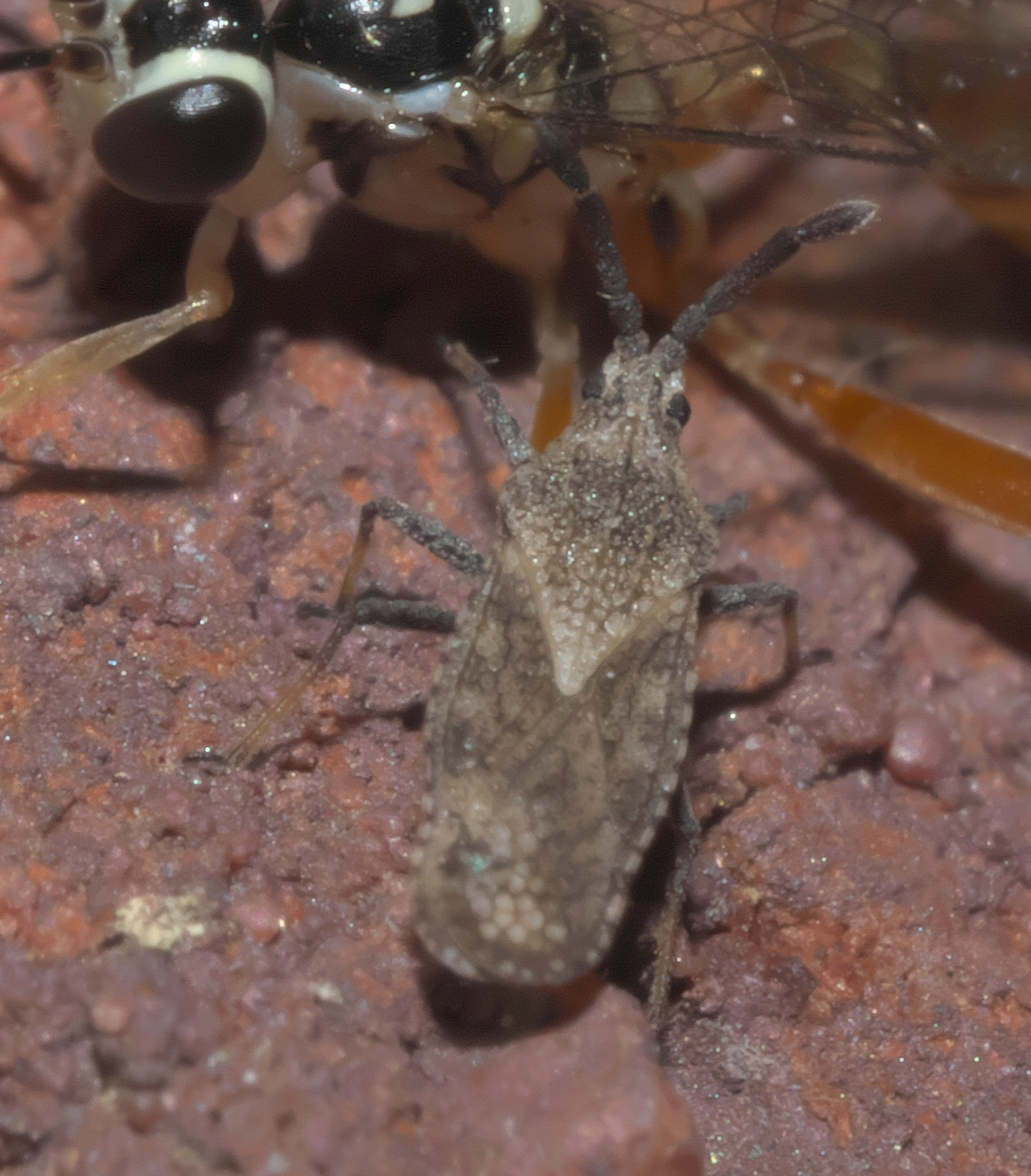
- Teleonemia nigrina

Scientific classification
- Domain: Eukaryota
- Kingdom: Animalia
- Phylum: Arthropoda
- Class: Insecta
- Order: Hemiptera
- Suborder: Heteroptera
- Family: Tingidae
- Tribe: Tingini
- Genus: Teleonemia; Costa, 1864

= Teleonemia =

Genus of true bugs

Teleonemia is a genus of lace bugs in the family Tingidae. There are at least 80 described species in Teleonemia.

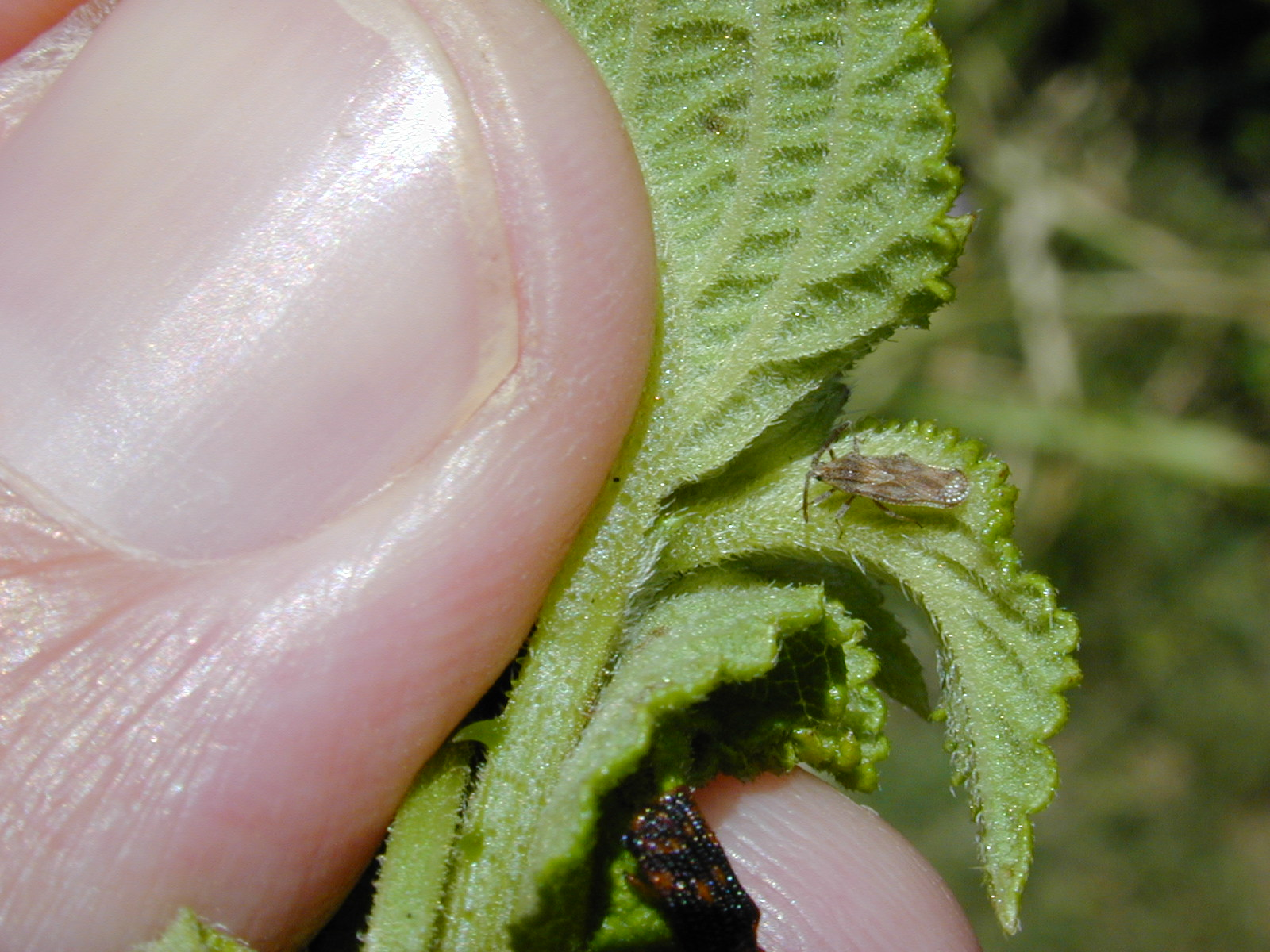
Teleonemia scrupulosa

== Species ==
- Teleonemia abdita Drake, 1939
- Teleonemia absimilis Drake and Hambleton, 1944
- Teleonemia adelphe Drake and Maldonado, 1965
- Teleonemia aemula Monte, 1942
- Teleonemia altilis Drake and Hambleton, 1944
- Teleonemia amazonica Horváth, 1925
- Teleonemia angustata Monte, 1943
- Teleonemia annae (Kirkaldy, 1905)
- Teleonemia argentinensis Drake and Poor, 1942
- Teleonemia aterrima Stål, 1873
- Teleonemia atrata Champion, 1898
- Teleonemia atriflava Monte, 1943
- Teleonemia bahiana Drake, 1942
- Teleonemia barberi Drake, 1918
- Teleonemia belfragii Stål, 1873
- Teleonemia bierigi Monte, 1943
- Teleonemia bifasciata Champion, 1898
- Teleonemia boliviana Drake, 1939
- Teleonemia bondari Monte, 1943
- Teleonemia bosqi Monte, 1943
- Teleonemia brevipennis Champion, 1898
- Teleonemia carmelana (Berg, 1892)
- Teleonemia chacoana Drake, 1942
- Teleonemia chapadiana Drake, 1922
- Teleonemia consors Drake, 1918
- Teleonemia crassispinosa Monte, 1946
- Teleonemia cylindricornis Champion, 1898
- Teleonemia dulcis Drake, 1939
- Teleonemia elata Drake, 1935
- Teleonemia elevata (Fabricius, 1803)
- Teleonemia forticornis Champion, 1898
- Teleonemia funerea Costa, 1864
- Teleonemia granulosa Monte, 1942
- Teleonemia guyanensis Drake and Carvalho, 1944
- Teleonemia harleyi Froeschner, 1970
- Teleonemia hasemani Drake, 1922
- Teleonemia huachucae Drake, 1941
- Teleonemia inops Drake and Hambleton, 1944
- Teleonemia inornata Monte, 1941
- Teleonemia jubata Drake and Hambleton, 1939
- Teleonemia jucunda Drake, 1939
- Teleonemia leitei Drake and Hambleton, 1939
- Teleonemia limbata (Stål, 1873)
- Teleonemia longicornis Champion, 1898
- Teleonemia luctuosa (Stål, 1858)
- Teleonemia lustrabilis Drake, 1953
- Teleonemia lutzi Drake, 1941
- Teleonemia mera Drake and Hambleton, 1942
- Teleonemia molinae Drake, 1940
- Teleonemia monile Van Duzee, 1918
- Teleonemia montivaga Drake, 1920
- Teleonemia morio (Stål, 1855)
- Teleonemia multimaculata Monte, 1940
- Teleonemia nigrina Champion, 1898
- Teleonemia notata Champion, 1898
- Teleonemia novicia Drake, 1920
- Teleonemia ochracea Champion, 1898
- Teleonemia paraguayana Drake, 1942
- Teleonemia patagonica Drake, 1948
- Teleonemia picta Champion, 1898
- Teleonemia pilicornis Champion, 1898
- Teleonemia prolixa (Stål, 1858)
- Teleonemia prunellae Drake and Hambleton, 1946
- Teleonemia quecha Monte, 1943
- Teleonemia rugosa Champion, 1898
- Teleonemia ruthae Monte, 1942
- Teleonemia sacchari (Fabricius, 1794)
- Teleonemia sandersi Drake and Hambleton, 1944
- Teleonemia schildi Drake, 1940
- Teleonemia schwarzi Drake, 1918
- Teleonemia scrupulosa Stal, 1873 (lantana lace bug)
- Teleonemia sidae (Fabricius, 1794)
- Teleonemia simillima Monte, 1941
- Teleonemia simulans Drake, 1922
- Teleonemia syssita Drake and Cobben, 1960
- Teleonemia telluris Drake and Hambleton, 1939
- Teleonemia teretis Drake, 1940
- Teleonemia triangularis (Blanchard, 1846)
- Teleonemia tricolor (Mayr, 1865)
- Teleonemia validicornis Stål, 1873
- Teleonemia variegata Champion, 1898
- Teleonemia veneris Drake, 1939
- Teleonemia vidua Van Duzee, 1918
- Teleonemia vulgata Drake and Hambleton, 1940
- Teleonemia vulsa Drake and Hambleton, 1944
