= Saccodon =

Scientific classification
- Kingdom: Animalia
- Phylum: Chordata
- Class: Actinopterygii
- Order: Characiformes
- Family: Parodontidae
- Genus: Saccodon; Kner, 1863

Type species
- Saccodon wagneri Kner, 1863

Synonyms
- Parodontops Schultz & Miles, 1943

Genus of fishes

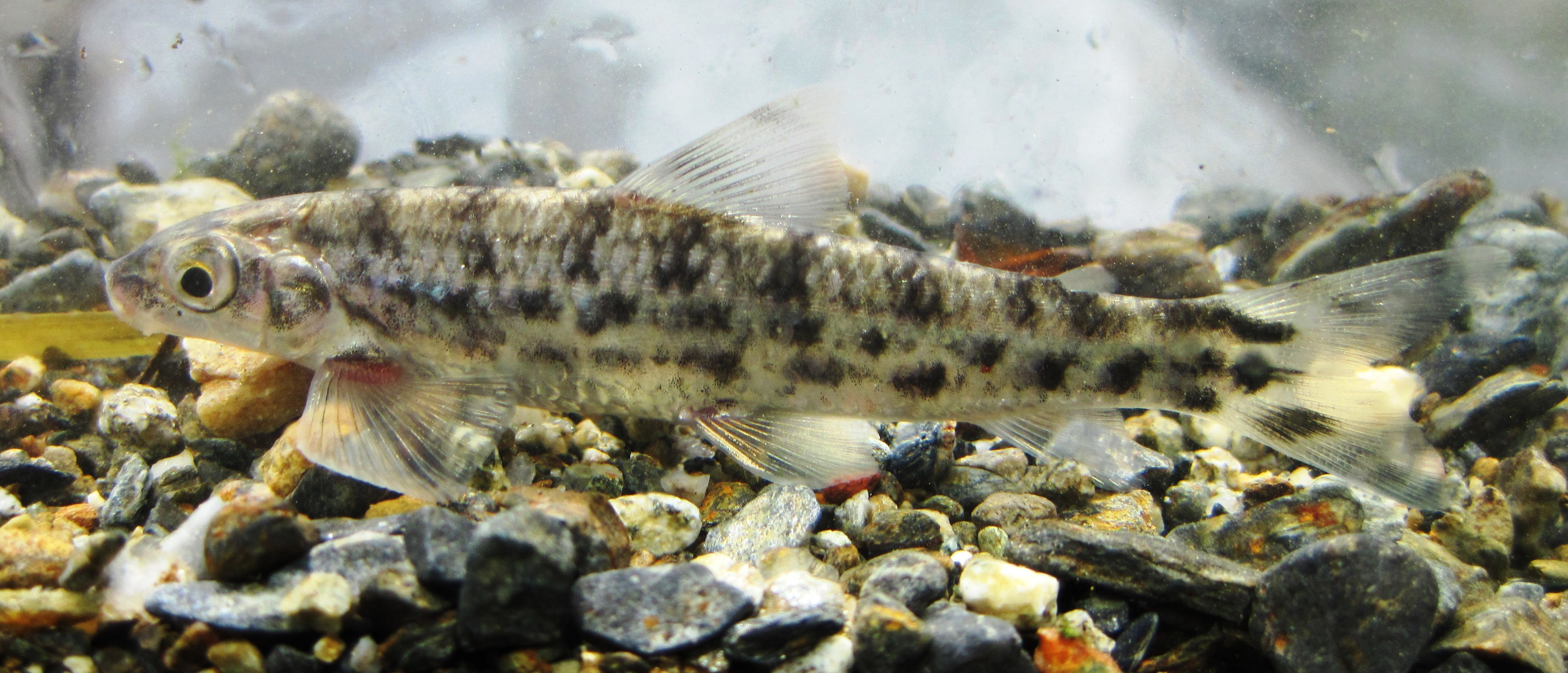
Saccodon dariensis

Saccodon is a genus of freshwater ray-finned fishes belonging to the family Parodontidae, the scrapetooths. The fishes in this genus are found in the Tumbes-Chocó-Magdalena region from Panama to northwestern Peru.

== Taxonomy ==
Saccodon was first proposed as a genus by the Austrian ichthyologist Rudolf Kner in his Eine Uebersicht der ichthyologischen Ausbeute des Herrn Professors Dr. Mor. Wagner in Central-Amerika (An overview of the ichthyological findings of Professor Dr. Mor. Wagner in Central America) published in 1863. Kner proposed it as a monospecific genus with Saccodon wagneri as its only species, this species being the type species by monotypy. S. wagneri was first formally described, by Kner in the same volume as he proposed the genus and its type locality was given as Ecuador. Saccodon is classified within the family Parodontidae, the scrapetooths, which is classified within the suborder Characoidei of the order Characiformes.

== Species ==
Saccodon contains the following valid species:

- Saccodon dariensis (Meek & Hildebrand, 1913)
- Saccodon terminalis (C. H. Eigenmann & Henn, 1914)
- Saccodon wagneri Kner, 1863

== Etymology ==
Saccodon is a combination of saccus, which means "bag", and odon, which is a Latinised derivative of the Greek oudos, meaning "teeth". This is a reference to "bulging mucus membrane" that Kner described, this surrounds the premaxillae of the type species and contains highly speciialised algae scraping teeth. The specific name of the type species, S. wagneri, honours the German explorer and geographer, Moritz Wagner (naturalist), who collected the type specimen and whose collections Kner was reviewing.

== Characteristics ==
Saccodon is distinguished from the other two genera in the Parodontidae by the possession of two rather than a single unbranched ray in the pectoral fins and, unlike the species specific teeth morphology of those genera, Saccodon scrapetooths show a high degree of dental polymorphism. These fishes vary in maximum size from a standard length of 4 cm (1.6 in) for S. terminalis up to 16.8 cm (6.6 in) for S. dariensis.

== Distribution and habitat ==
Saccodon scrapetooths are found in the pacific slope drainages of southern Central America and northwestern South America, from southern Panama to northwestern Peru. These fishes are found in streams with fast currents where they feed by scraping off algae growing on rocks, keeping their position by using their pectoral fins to hold onto the substrate.
