= Annals of Carnegie Museum =

- Discipline: zoology, paleontology, geology, anthropology
- Language: English
- Edited by: John R. Wible and John E. Rawlins

Publication details
- History: 1901–present
- Publisher: Carnegie Museum of Natural History (United States)
- Frequency: Quarterly
- Open access: Yes
- Impact factor: 0.724 (2014)

Standard abbreviations
- ISO 4: Ann. Carnegie Mus.

Indexing
- ISSN: 0097-4463 (print); 1943-6300 (web)
- OCLC no.: 1261514

Links
- Journal homepage; Online access (2005-present); Online access at (1901-1922)

Annals of Carnegie Museum is a peer-reviewed academic journal published by the Carnegie Museum of Natural History. It was established in 1901 by the Board of Trustees of the Carnegie Institute. The journal is distributed both in print and online. The museum's Office of Scientific Publications also publishes the Bulletin of Carnegie Museum of Natural History and Special Publications of Carnegie Museum.

The journal is abstracted and indexed in the Science Citation Index, Scopus, Biosis, and GEOBASE.

According to the Journal Citation Reports, the journal has a 2014 impact factor of 0.724, ranking it 38th out of 49 journals in the category "Paleontology" and 115th out of 153 journals in the category "Zoology".
