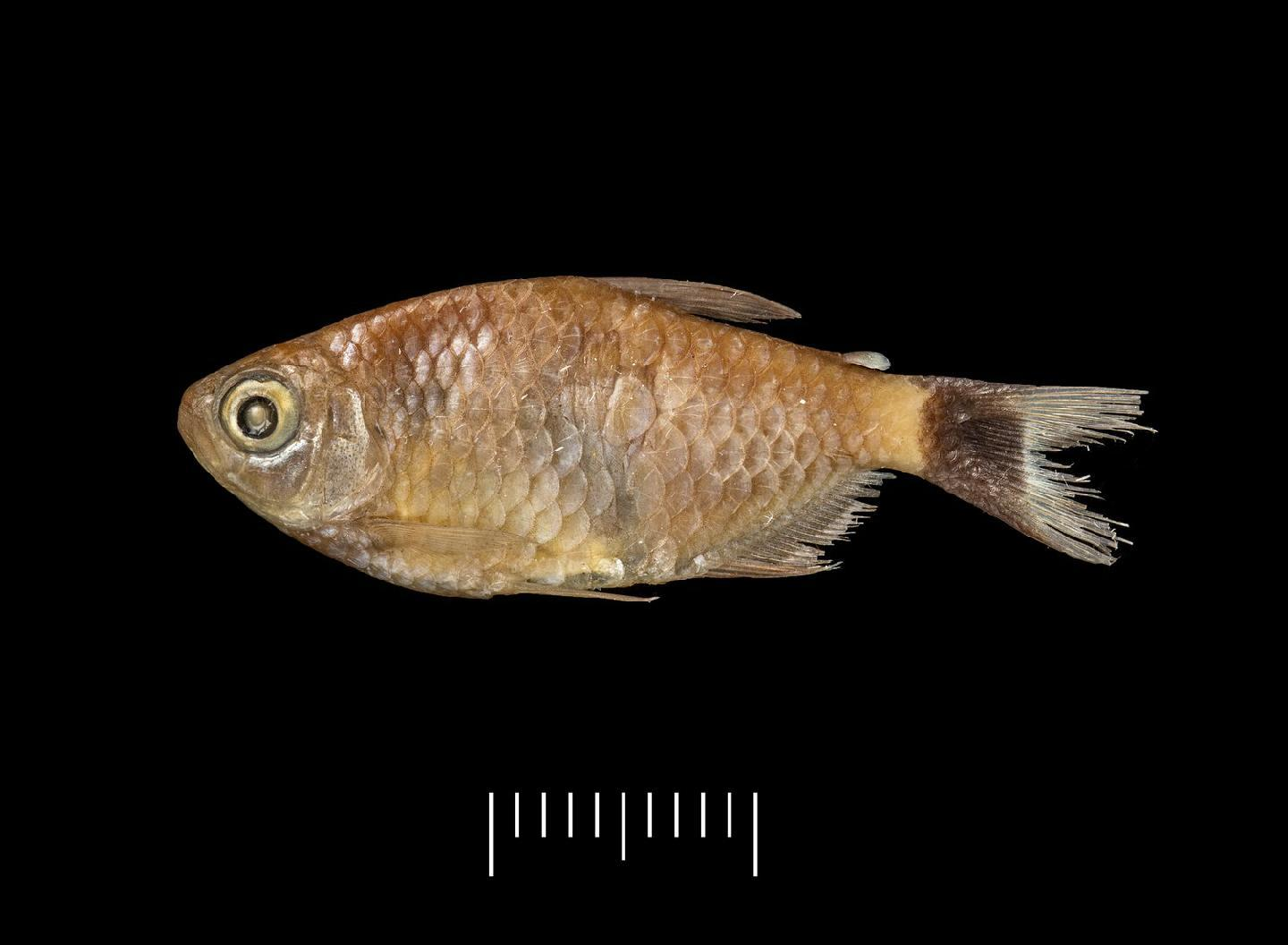
- Specimen collected from Carandasinho in Mato Grosso, Brazil

Conservation status
- Least Concern (IUCN 3.1)

Scientific classification
- Kingdom: Animalia
- Phylum: Chordata
- Class: Actinopterygii
- Order: Characiformes
- Family: Acestrorhamphidae
- Genus: Bario
- Species: B. forestii

Binomial name
- Bario forestii (Benine, Mariguela & Oliveira, 2009)

= Bario forestii =

Species of ray-finned fish

Bario forestii, commonly called Forest's tetra, is a species of freshwater ray-finned fish in the family Characidae. It is a small tetra native to central South America, described scientifically in 2009.

== Taxonomy ==
The species was formally described by Ricardo C. Benine, Tatiane C. Mariguela, and Claudio Oliveira in 2009 as Moenkhausia forestii. The specific name forestii honors the ichthyologist Fausto Foresti for his contributions to fish genetics. The genus Moenkhausia itself is named after William J. Moenkhaus.

In 2024, the species was transferred to genus Bario.

== Description ==
Bario forestii is a small characin, with adults reaching a maximum standard length of approximately 36.4 mm. It has a laterally compressed body with an incomplete lateral line composed of 23–26 pored scales. The species' coloration includes a reticulated pattern on the body scales and a humeral (shoulder) spot. The eye may exhibit a reddish hue. Morphological features such as the number of scale rows above and below the lateral line differentiate it from closely related species.

== Distribution and habitat ==
This species is native to Brazil, primarily in rivers of the Paraguay and middle and upper Paraná basins, including tributaries in the states of Mato Grosso, Mato Grosso do Sul, and Paraná. The construction of a fish ladder around the Itaipu Dam is believed to have caused its expansion into the upper Paraná, as the Guaíra Falls previously served as a natural barrier. It inhabits subtropical freshwater environments.

== Conservation ==
Bario forestii is not currently regarded as threatened.
