= Wanám =

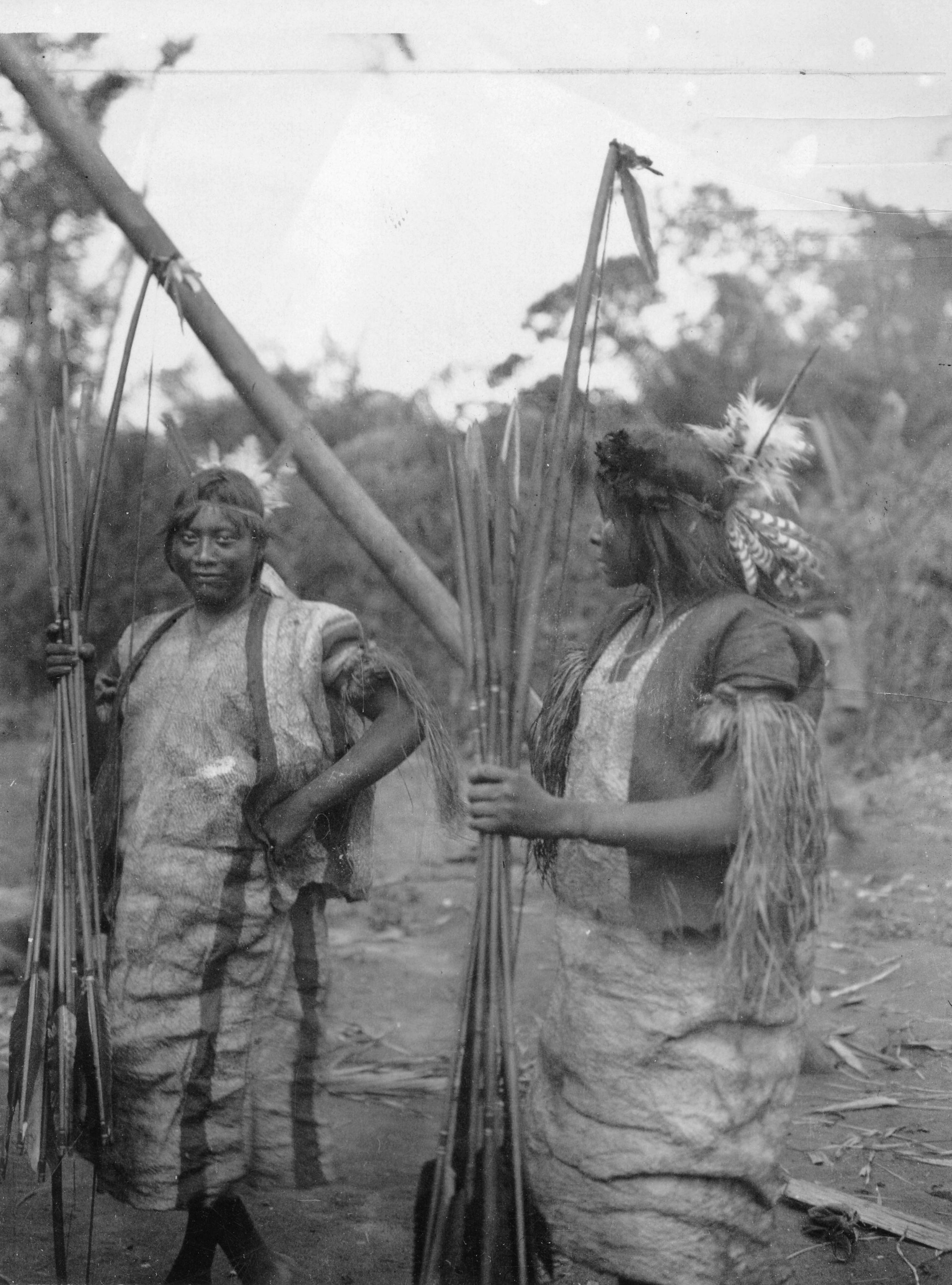
- Two Wanám with weapons in 1914, Rio San Miguel. Photo by Erland Nordenskiöld 1914.

Total population
- 0

Regions with significant populations
- Brazil

Languages
- Wanám

Religion
- Roman Catholicism (often syncretic with indigenous beliefs)

Related ethnic groups
- Moré (Itene), Chapacura

Photo and drawing of Wamán man with weapons. Photo by Erland Nordenskiöld, drawing by H. Kjellstedt, 1914

The Wanám (also Huanyam and Pawumwa) were a group of Amerindians once native to the region of southern Rondônia in Brazil. They lived on the Cautarinho, São Miguel and Manoel rivers near their confluence with the Guaporé. Around 1914 there were 300 Wanám. The rubber booms of the twentieth century destroyed the tribe because of the violence and diseases brought in by neo-Brazilians. The surviving Wanám went to live with neighboring groups called Kabixí living on the São Miguel River. Although the Wanám people did not survive as a distinct ethnic group, their language did, at least among the Kabixí.

== Dwellings ==
Wanám took refuge from mosquitoes in small conical cabines tightly thatched with patoju leaves. They also built small shelters consisting of a few palm leaves placed horizontally on three perpendicular poles, for workshops and as men's clubs. They used hammocks made of cotton but sometimes also fibers.

== Subsistance ==
Farming was practiced by all the people living along Guaporé in the 19th and 20th century including Wanám and had greater importance than collecting or hunting. They had taboo restrictions for some kind of foods, for example it was taboo to eat deer meat. Very important was also the Brazil nut tree. Nordenskiöld tells about the presence of Brazil nuts in all settlements they visited in 1914.

== Dress and adornment ==
The dress of both sexes were a long barkcloth shirt. This was often discarded if it interfered with one's activities or was likely to be damaged by water. The shirts were decorated with sewn or glued strips of bark cloth or dyed with urucu. Over the shirt, men often wore a barkcloth jacket, open in front. They also tied up the foreskin of the penis with a cotton thread and tucked it under a string belt. Women tied plaited cotton ligatures around the fleshy parts of their limbs. Adult women thrust large conical quartz labrets in the lower lip and smaller ones in the upper lip; girls used only resin spikes as labrets. A typical ornament was a fiber band with long hanging fringes, attached around each bicep. Around the upper arm, women wore a row of triangular shell pendants strung with seeds.

The complete festive attire consisted of feather head-dresses, monkey- or sloth-skin caps, bark-cloth frontlets, feather bracelets, and ear sticks trimmed with feathers and Astrocaryum or feather rings. Necklaces were strung with seeds or animal teeth. Both men and women parted their hair in the middle and cut it at shoulder level. Combs were made of bamboo splinters (composite type). They removed all body hair. Tattooing is not mentioned in the literature but body paintings were practiced. It consisted of various geometrical motifs: Reticulated surfaces, dots, zigzags, stripes, etc., and they used urucu and genipa.

== Transportation ==
Wanám were known to make canoes from bark but when they got access to axes of metal they started to do dugouts.

== Craft ==
=== Barkcloth ===
The inner bark wais beaten with the edge of a flat wooden mallet to detach it from the wooden layer; then it was cut to proper size. Patches of bark were hammered on a smooth log, wrung thoroughly, dried, and sewn together. Men were their own and their wives' tailors. Decorative effects were achieved by glueing or sewing strips or patches of different colors on the surface. Sewing needles were made of bone or of Astrocaryum wood.

=== Spinning and weaving ===
Thin cotton threads were made with a drop spindle which had a fruit or a wooden disk for a whorl and a small hook at the proximal end. Thicker strings were manufactured by the roll method : Cotton was first twisted by hand, then attached to the toes, and twisted again by means of a spindle rolled up and down the left thigh. Arm and leg bands were woven on a small loom formed by lashing two transverse cross bars to a frame made of a forked branch. The warp was wound around the two cross bars. The final pattern of the fabric was obtained by crossing the warp threads and holding them in place with wooden splinters which were removed as the weft was passed through in their place. Hammocks were made by wrapping the warp around two vertical posts and twining it at set intervals.

=== Pottery ===
Potter's clay was mixed with the ashes of a kind of sponge that floats in flooded forests. The sponges contain calcium spiculae, which give unusual strength to the clay. Vessels were coiled, then scraped with shells, and polished with pebbles. After the clay had hardened, the pot was dried before a patoju-leaf screen that separated it from the fire. The dried pot was then covered with wood and fired in the open. Painted decoration was applied after firing. The inside was smeared with a black waxlike coating. The main vessel types were bowls, large jars which taper to a point so that they may be stuck into the sandy ground, and other forms.

=== Basketry ===
Basketry work included mats, sieves, fire fans, knapsacks, and rectangular baskets. A type of basket was constructed by intertwining the leaflets of a palm leaf on either side of the woody leaf-stalk, whereby something resembling a mat was produced. The woody portion running down the middle of the leaf stalk was then cut away and the mat doubled, whereupon, along the line where the edges meet, the leaflets were interwoven so that a cylindrical basket was formed. Around the bottom there was a raised ring.

=== Tools ===
The Wanám carved wood with agouti incisors hafted to a stick, with piranha teeth, or with bird bones and pierce holes with bone awls.

Man demonstrating blowgun to Erland Nordenskiöld 1914.

=== Weapons ===
War arrows had large lanceolate bamboo heads, sometimes artistically jagged along the edges. Hunting arrows were tipped with a bone slinter serving both as point and barb. They also used human arm bones for making arrowheads. The reason for using arm bones since the arm is what you use when firing a bow. Bird arrows consisted of a reed with its bulbous root forming the head. Fish arrows had one to three points. The feathering was either of the wrapped (Arara feathering) or of the sewn type (Xingii feathering). The feathering of some arrows consisted of three or even four feathers, an unusual number. The whistling arrows were provided with a hollow nut near the tip. Wanám poisoned their arrows with curare and carried them with the points in a bamboo sheath to prevent accidents. They hunted with simple blowguns made of a section of bamboo about 6 feet (2 m.) in length. Blowgun darts, usually made of thin palm splinters, were kept in a section of bamboo enclosed in a palm spathe. They were also poisoned with curare. For the release, the arrow was held between the index and the middle finger.

=== Musical instruments ===
Some trumpets had a bell modeled of wax and affixed to a long tube of human bone; other trumpets were globular in shape and made of clay; and still others combined a wide bamboo resonator, a slender bamboo tube, and a separate mouth piece. Those trumpets were used for signals when arriving to a village or settlement.

=== Fire ===
Fire was produced by the drill method. Cotton or bark cloth was used as tinder. Basketry fire fans were rectangular. For torches, pieces of bark were dipped in wax.

== Social organization ==
Woman, photographed by Erland Nordenskiöld in 1914.

There were as many chiefs as family heads, but their authority was scant.

=== Puberty and marriage ===
At puberty, girls' upper and lower lips were perforated by the shaman. In some settlements, the number of men so far exceeded that of women, that married women were permitted, it is said, to have extramarital intercourse. Parents and children-in-law turn their faces away when speaking to each other; the same avoidance exists between cross-cousins.

=== Funeral rites ===
When death approaches, a Wanám distributed his possessions among his heirs. After he had died, his past deeds were celebrated in a chant. He was then wrapped in his hammock and buried outside the house in a circular grave surrounded by a high fence.

=== Shamanism ===
When effecting a cure, the Wanám shaman reached a state of trance by smoking a great many cigarettes containing fine powder made of an unidentified substance, and resin fragments. Most of the treatment consisted of blowing smoke on the patient.

=== War and conflicts ===
When visiting Wanám in 1914 Nordesnkiöld tells about conflicts with other tribes and groups, especially with fights with the Cabiji that probably was another Wanám group. This conflict resulted in 10 dead Cabiji. Also Creném who lived in the upper San Miguel were said to be enemies.
