= Histoire naturelle des poissons =

Publication on fish by Georges Cuvier

Histoire naturelle des poissons is a 22-volume treatment of ichthyology published in 1828–1849 by the French savant Georges Cuvier (1769–1832) and his student and successor Achille Valenciennes (1794–1865). It was a systematic compendium of the fishes of the world known at that time, and treated altogether 4 514 species of fishes, of which 2 311 were new to science. It is still one of the most ambitious undertakings in ichthyology ever. Most of the work appeared after the death of Cuvier. Later, Auguste Duméril still supplemented the work by two volumes in 1865 and 1870, which dealt mostly with groups that Cuvier had omitted, such as sharks.

Cuvier's treatment was not only based on the resources and samples of the Muséum national d'histoire naturelle, where he was a director, but also on an extensive network of correspondents and explorers that were travelling around the world and collecting and sending samples and observations.
