= Dark mangrovegoby =

Conservation status
- Least Concern (IUCN 3.1)

Scientific classification
- Kingdom: Animalia
- Phylum: Chordata
- Class: Actinopterygii
- Order: Gobiiformes
- Family: Gobiidae
- Genus: Dotsugobius; Shibukawa, T. Suzuki & Senou, 2014
- Species: D. bleekeri

Binomial name
- Dotsugobius bleekeri (Popta, 1921)

Synonyms
- Lophogobius bleekeri Popta, 1921

Species of fish

The dark mangrovegoby (Dotsugobius bleekeri) is a species of fish in the family Gobiidae known from brackish estuarine and the adjacent freshwater areas of the eastern Indian Ocean, Andaman Sea and Western Pacific.

== Etymology ==
The generic name honours the Japanese ichthyologist Yoshie Dotsu of Nagasaki University, whose surname was spelled "Dôtu" in his earlier publications, while the specific name honours the Dutch ichthyologist, herpetologist and physician Pieter Bleeker (1819–1878) who was a significant worker on the fish fauna of the Dutch East Indies. This species is placed in the genus Lophogobius by some authorities.
