= Praealticus labrovittatus =

- Praealticus labrovittatus jumping

Conservation status
- Least Concern (IUCN 3.1)

Scientific classification
- Kingdom: Animalia
- Phylum: Chordata
- Class: Actinopterygii
- Order: Blenniiformes
- Family: Blenniidae
- Genus: Praealticus
- Species: P. labrovittatus

Binomial name
- Praealticus labrovittatus Bath, 1992

Species of fish

Praealticus labrovittatus, the crenulate-lipped rockskipper, is a species of combtooth blenny found in the coral reefs in the western Pacific ocean. This species reaches a length of 4.2 centimetres (1.7 in) SL.
