= Praealticus dayi =

Conservation status
- Least Concern (IUCN 3.1)

Scientific classification
- Kingdom: Animalia
- Phylum: Chordata
- Class: Actinopterygii
- Order: Blenniiformes
- Family: Blenniidae
- Genus: Praealticus
- Species: P. dayi

Binomial name
- Praealticus dayi (Whitley, 1929)

Synonyms
- Salarias dayi Whitley, 1929

Species of fish

Praealticus dayi is a species of combtooth blenny found in the eastern Indian Ocean, in the Andaman Islands.

== Etymology ==
The specific name honours the English military doctor and naturalist Francis Day (1829-1889) who was the Inspector-General of Fisheries in India. Day had described this blenny as Salarias alboguttatus in 1876 but this name was preoccupied by Salarias alboguttatus which had been described by Rudolf Kner in 1867.
