= Canna Maria Louise Popta =

Dutch biologist (1860–1929)

- Born: May 31, 1860
- Died: June 13, 1929 (aged 69)
- Education: Leiden University

Canna Maria Louise Popta (31 May 1860 – 13 June 1929) was a Dutch biologist.

Born in Breda, Popta was one of the first women to enrol as a student at Leiden University where she studied for a degree in geology, zoology and botany, allowing her to teach in high schools. She studied for her doctorate at the University of Berne under the supervision of Eduard Fischer: her thesis was on the Hemiasci, a fungal group which was then thought to be the link between the Phycomycetes and Ascomycota. She also wrote an 1897 article about fungi on sugar cane. After completing her doctorate she obtained a position at the Rijksmuseum van Natuurlijke Historie in Leiden as a Lab Assistant to the curator of reptiles, amphibians and fishes. During her career at the museum she concentrated mainly on ichthyology, eventually retiring in 1928, and dying the following year in Leiden. She wrote over 40 scientific papers and a number of articles for encyclopedias. For example, she wrote a final compilation of the freshwater fish collected in central Borneo, describing a fish fauna of 173 species from the Kapuas and 97 species from the Mahakam. She also tried to complete and publish Bleeker's Atlas Ichthyologique des Indes Orientales néerlandaises but this was halted due to economic difficulties, the plates eventually being published in 1983 but by then the text was considered to be too out of date to be published. She seems to have had a difficult time at the museum and often appeared to be in conflict with and not highly regarded by the two directors she worked under, Jentink and E.D. van Oort, and there are some indications that she may have suffered from mental ill health. Popta never married and lived with, and cared for her sister, who was said to be disabled. Despite the supposedly difficult relationship she had with Jentink she named the cyprinid Diplocheilichthys jentinkii in his honour for making specimens available for Popta to study.

== Publications ==
- Popta, C.M.L. 1897 Schimmels gevunden op doode stengels van het West Indisch Suikerriet, Archief voor de Java Suiker Industrie 5, pp 1075–1076
- Popta, C.M.L. 1899 Beitrag zur Kenntniss der Hemiasci, Flora 86, pp 1–46
- Popta, C.M.L. 1900: A new species of Arius. Notes from the Leyden Museum 22 (1-2): 71–74. ISSN 1872-9231
- Popta, C.M.L. 1900: On a small Monacanthus. Notes from the Leyden Museum 22 (1-2): 126–128. ISSN 1872-9231
- Popta, C.M.L. 1901: Note 10. Tetragonopterus longipinnis, n. sp. Notes from the Leyden Museum 23: 85–90. ISSN 1872-9231
- Popta, C.M.L. 1903: Acanthophthalmus shelfordii, n. sp. Notes from the Leyden Museum 23: 231–233. ISSN 1872-9231
- Popta, C.M.L. 1904: Descriptions préliminaires des nouvelles espèces de poissons recueillies au Bornéo central par M. le Dr. A. W. Nieuwenhuis en 1898 et en 1900. Notes from the Leyden Museum 24 (for 1902-04): 179–202. ISSN 1872-9231
- Popta, C.M.L. 1905: Suite des descriptions préliminaires des nouvelles espèces de poissons recueillies au Bornéo central par M. le Dr. A. W. Nieuwenhuis en 1898 et en 1900. Notes from the Leyden Museum 25 (note 15): 171–186. ISSN 1872-9231
- Popta, C.M.L. 1905: Haplochilus sarasinorum, n. sp. Notes from the Leyden Museum 25 (4): 239–247. ISSN 1872-9231
- Popta, C.M.L. 1906: Résultats ichthyologiques des voyages scientifiques de Monsieur le Professeur Dr. A. W. Nieuwenhuis dans le centre de Bornéo (1898 et 1900). Notes from the Leyden Museum 27: 1–304, 10 pls. ISSN 1872-9231
- Popta, C.M.L. 1907: Einige Fischarten aus China, Xenocypris lampertii und Chanodichthys stenzii nn. spp. Zoologischer Anzeiger 32 (no. 8): 243–251.
- Popta, C.M.L. 1911: Ueber Fische von Wladiwostok und von Blagoweschtensk a. Amur, gesammelt von Herrn Dr. P. v. Wittenburg. Jahreshefte des Vereins für Vaterländische Naturkunde in Württemberg 75: 333–353.
- Popta, C.M.L. 1911: Vorläufige Mitteilung über neue Fische von Lombok. Notes from the Leyden Museum 34: 9–16. ISSN 1872-9231
- Popta, C.M.L. 1912: Fortsetzung der Beschreibung von neuen Fischarten der Sunda-Expedition. Notes from the Leyden Museum 34 (3-4): 185–193. ISSN 1872-9231
- Popta, C.M.L. 1913: Auchenoglanis büttikoferi n. sp. from West Africa. Notes from the Leyden Museum 35 (3-4): 237–240, Pl. 10. ISSN 1872-9231
- Popta, C.M.L. 1918: Zweite Fortsetzung der Beschreibung von neuen Fischarten der Sunda-Expedition. Leiden. Zweite Fortsetzung der Beschreibung von neuen Fischarten der Sunda-Expedition.: 1–8.
- Popta, C.M.L. 1919: Description of Clarias nigeriae n. sp. from the Wari, mouth of the Niger, West Africa. Zoologische Mededelingen (Leiden) 5: 4.
- Popta, C.M.L. 1921: Dritte Fortsetzung der Beschreibung von neuen Fischarten der Sunda-Expedition. Zoologische Mededelingen (Leiden) 6: 203–214.
- Popta, C.M.L. 1922: Vierte und letzte fortsetzung der Beschreibung von neuen Fischarten der Sunda-Expedition. Zoologische Mededelingen (Leiden) 7: 27–39.
- Popta, C.M.L. 1924: Anguilla borneensis n. sp.. Zoologische Mededelingen (Leiden) 8: 73–76.

== Taxa ==
Among the taxa first described by Popta are the fishes Tetraodon hilgendorfii, Pangasius nieuwenhuisii, Dotsugobius bleekeri and Osteochilus bellus. She also named the goby genera Cryptocentroides. and Pseudogobius.

Poptella a genus of Characins was named for Popta who described Tetragonopterus longipinnis in 1901 and donated one of the type specimens to Carl H. Eigenmann’s collection at Indiana University, Eigenmann subsequently described the new genus Poptella in 1908. The fish species Trichopodus poptae, Adrianichthys poptae and the Marianas rockskipper (Praealticus poptae) are among those to have their specific names referring to and honouring Canna M. L. Popta.

== See also ==
- Category:Taxa named by Canna Maria Louise Popta
