= Praealticus semicrenatus =

Conservation status
- Least Concern (IUCN 3.1)

Scientific classification
- Kingdom: Animalia
- Phylum: Chordata
- Class: Actinopterygii
- Order: Blenniiformes
- Family: Blenniidae
- Genus: Praealticus
- Species: P. semicrenatus

Binomial name
- Praealticus semicrenatus (W. M. Chapman, 1951)

Synonyms
- Alticus semicrenatus Chapman, 1951

Species of fish

Praealticus semicrenatus, the Lembeh rockskipper, is a species of combtooth blenny found in the western central Pacific ocean, around Indonesia.
