= Praealticus bilineatus =

Conservation status
- Least Concern (IUCN 3.1)

Scientific classification
- Kingdom: Animalia
- Phylum: Chordata
- Class: Actinopterygii
- Order: Blenniiformes
- Family: Blenniidae
- Genus: Praealticus
- Species: P. bilineatus

Binomial name
- Praealticus bilineatus (W. K. H. Peters, 1868)

Synonyms
- Salarias bilineatus Peters, 1868

Species of fish

Praealticus bilineatus is a species of combtooth blenny found in coral reefs in the western Pacific Ocean.
