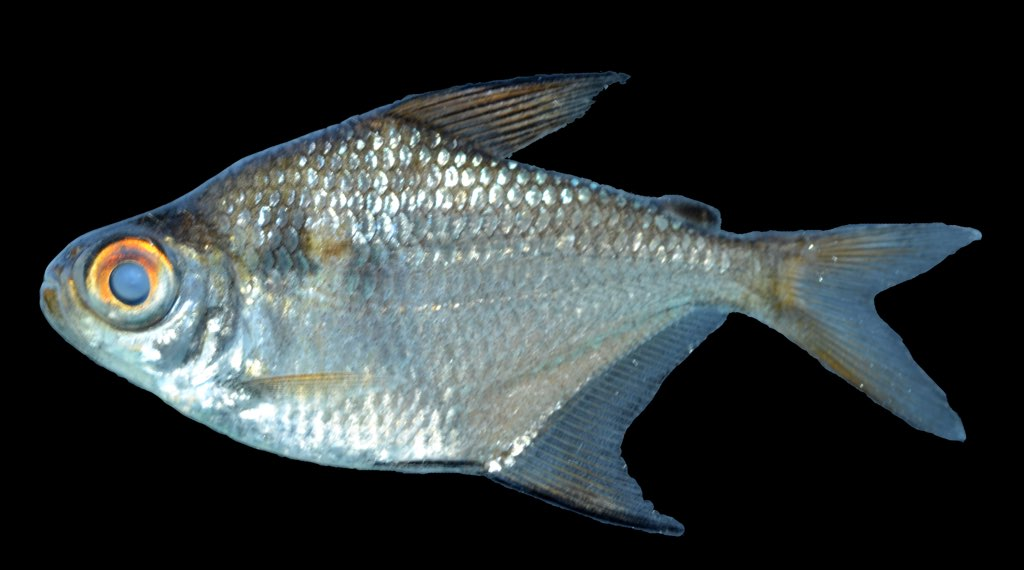
- Poptella sp.

Scientific classification
- Kingdom: Animalia
- Phylum: Chordata
- Class: Actinopterygii
- Order: Characiformes
- Family: Acestrorhamphidae
- Subfamily: Stethaprioninae
- Genus: Poptella; C. H. Eigenmann, 1908

Type species
- Tetragonopterus longipinnis Popta, 1901

Synonyms
- Fowlerina C. H. Eigenmann, 1907; Ephippicharax Fowler, 1913

= Poptella =

Genus of fishes

Poptella is a genus of freshwater ray-finned fish belonging to the family Acestrorhamphidae, the American characins. The fishes in this genus are found in tropical South America. The name of this genus honours the Dutch ichthyologist Canna Maria Louise Popta who was a Curator of Reptiles, Amphibians and Fishes at the Rijksmuseum van Natuurlijke Historie in Leiden and who described the type species of this genus as Tetragonopterus longipinnis in 1901, donating one of the types to Carl H. Eigenmann’s collection at Indiana University.

== Species ==
Poptella contains the following valid species:

- Poptella abathes Garcia-Ayala, Oliveira & Benine, 2025
- Poptella actenolepis Garcia-Ayala & Benine, 2019
- Poptella brevispina Reis, 1989
- Poptella compressa (Günther, 1864)
- Poptella fortispina Garcia-Ayala & Benine, 2023
- Poptella fuscata Garcia-Ayala & Benine, 2020
- Poptella longipinnis (Popta, 1901)
- Poptella magnuspina Garcia-Ayala, Oliveira & Benine, 2025
- Poptella paraguayensis (C. H. Eigenmann, 1907)
- Poptella spinula Garcia-Ayala, Oliveira & Benine, 2025
