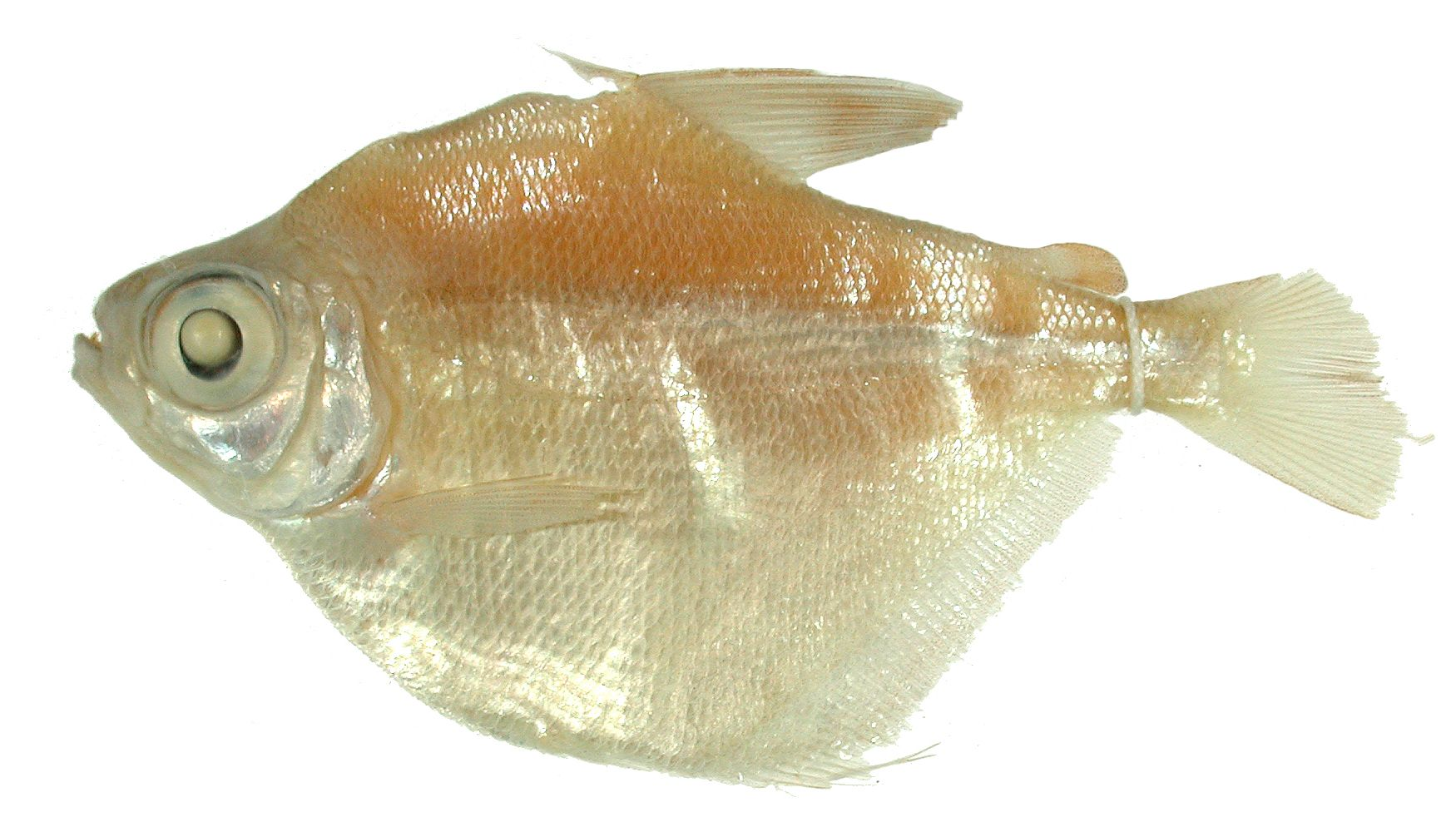
- Stethaprion crenatum

Scientific classification
- Kingdom: Animalia
- Phylum: Chordata
- Class: Actinopterygii
- Order: Characiformes
- Family: Acestrorhamphidae
- Subfamily: Stethaprioninae; C. H. Eigenmann, 1907

Type genus
- Stethaprion Cope, 1870

Genera
- See text

= Stethaprioninae =

Subfamily of fishes

Stethaprioninae is a subfamily of freshwater ray-finned fishes belonging to the family Acestrorhamphidae, the American characins. The fishes in this subfamily are found in South America.

== Genera ==
Stethaprioninae contains the following genera:

- Brachychalcinus Boulenger, 1892
- Ectrepopterus Fowler, 1943
- Orthospinus Reis, 1989
- Poptella C. H. Eigenmann, 1908
- Stethaprion Cope, 1870
