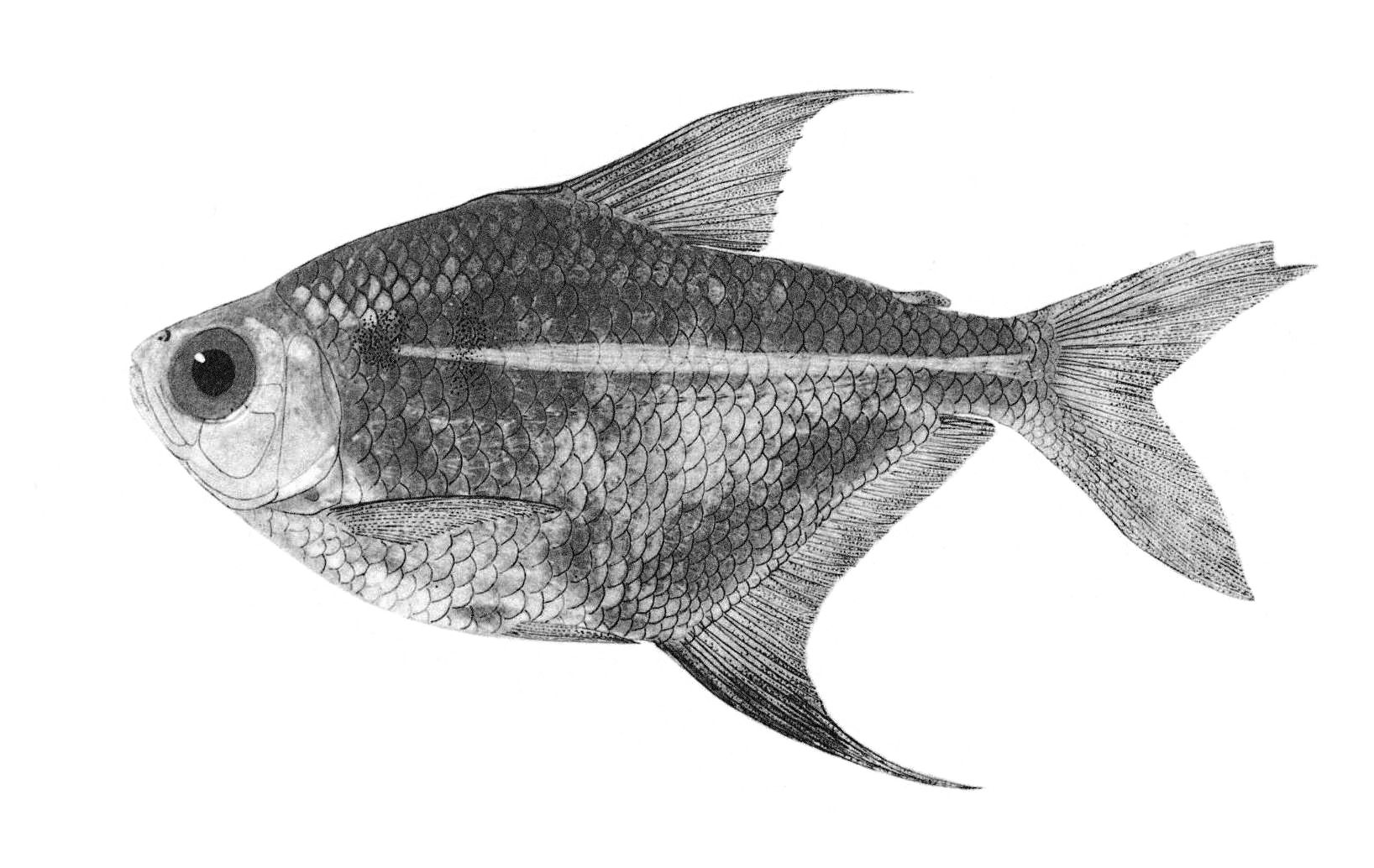

Conservation status
- Least Concern (IUCN 3.1)

Scientific classification
- Kingdom: Animalia
- Phylum: Chordata
- Class: Actinopterygii
- Order: Characiformes
- Family: Acestrorhamphidae
- Subfamily: Stethaprioninae
- Genus: Orthospinus; R. E. dos Reis, 1989
- Species: O. franciscensis

Binomial name
- Orthospinus franciscensis (C. H. Eigenmann, 1914)

Synonyms
- Genus: Buritia Brant, 1974; Species: Fowlerina franciscensis C. H. Eigenmann, 1914; Ephippicharax franciscoensis C. H. Eigenmann, 1929; Buritia cisalpinoi Brant, 1974

= Orthospinus =

Species of fish

Orthospinus is a monospecific genus of freshwater ray-finned fish belonging to the family Acestrorhamphidae, the American characins. The only species in the genus is Orthospinus franciscensis, which is endemic to Brazil, where it is found in the São Francisco River basin.
