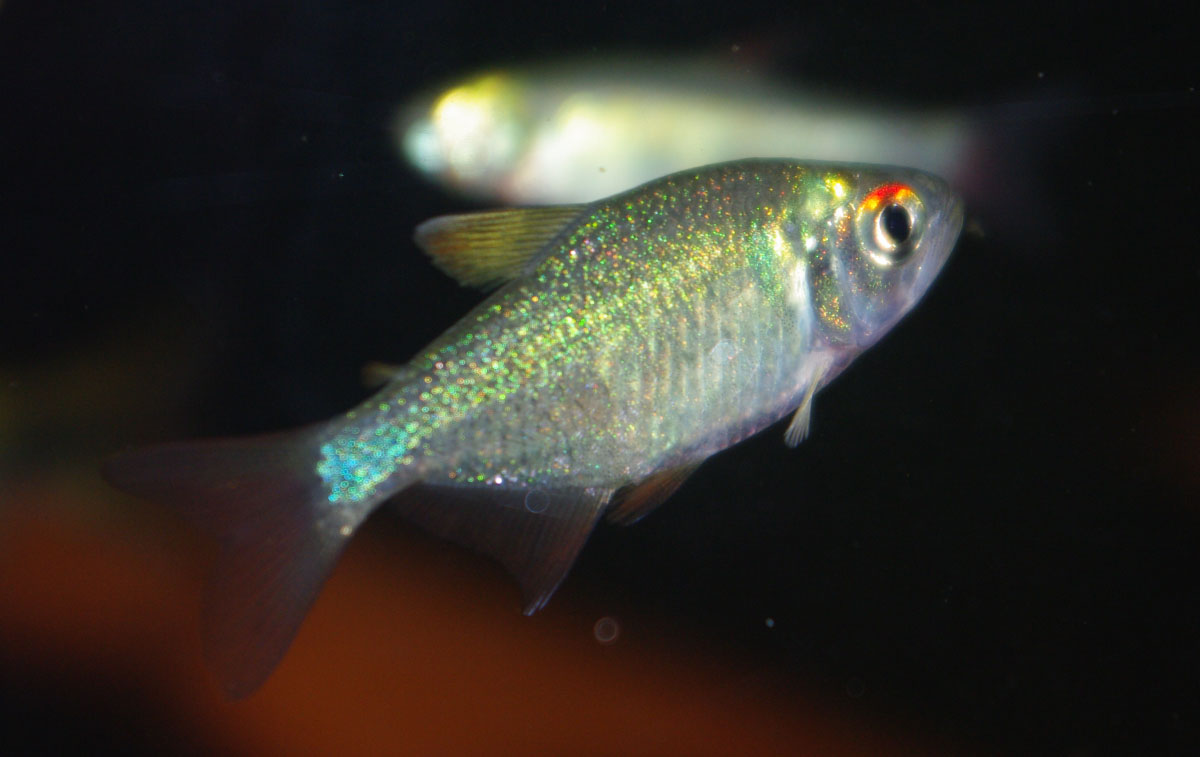

Conservation status
- Near Threatened (IUCN 3.1)

Scientific classification
- Kingdom: Animalia
- Phylum: Chordata
- Class: Actinopterygii
- Order: Characiformes
- Family: Acestrorhamphidae
- Subfamily: Stethaprioninae
- Genus: Ectrepopterus (Fowler, 1943)
- Species: E. uruguayensis

Binomial name
- Ectrepopterus uruguayensis Fowler, 1943

Synonyms
- Megalamphodus uruguayensis (Fowler, 1943); Hyphessobrycon uruguayensis (Fowler 1943)

= Ectrepopterus =

Species of fish

Ectrepopterus is a monospecific genus of freshwater ray-finned fish belonging to the family Acestrorhamphidae, the American characins. The only species in the genus is Ectrepopterus uruguayensis. Given its restricted range, it is considered a rare fish, and is of note for conservation researchers interested in preserving the biodiversity of the region.

A small fish with silvery-gold scales and yellow fins, E. uruguayensis is characterized by a variety of features, including an incomplete lateral line and eyes wider than the snout is long. Something of particular note is the presence of bony hooks on the fin-rays of the pectoral fin, which is unusual for a characin; other members of Characidae may display these hooks on the pelvic or anal fins, but the pectoral fin is an uncommon location. E. uruguayensis can be found living in syntopy with other characids in the wild, such as the genera Bryconamericus and Astyanax, and has a preference for shallow, flowing waters with ample vegetation.

== Taxonomy ==
When originally described by American ichthyologist Henry Weed Fowler in 1943, E. uruguayensis was named Megalamphodus (Ectrepopterus) uruguayensis, placing Ectrepopterus as a subgenus instead of a full genus. In 1997, Megalamphodus was determined to be synonymous with Hyphessobrycon, though the researchers (Lisa Palmer and Stanley Weitzman) noted that this was in need of further research. Nonetheless, this decision has generally been upheld, and Megalamphodus remains a synonym of Hyphessobrycon to this day. E. uruguayensis was considered a member of Hyphessobrycon from 1997 onwards, under the name Hyphessobrycon uruguayensis, but research in 2012 overturned this and resurrected Ectrepopterus from synonymy, designating E. uruguayensis the sole member.

When E. uruguayensis was still a member of Megalamphodus, French ichthyologist Jacques Gery noted a potential relationship to M. micropterus (Hyphessobrycon micropterus) and M. sweglesi (Hyphessobrycon sweglesi) based upon morphometric characteristics. Given different generic designations, E. uruguayensis is, in reality, unlikely to share elements of close phylogeny with the other two species.

=== Etymology ===
The genus name originates in Greek. "Ectrepos" means "reversed", and "pterus" means "fin" or "wing", in reference to the caudal fin; the upper lobe is shorter than the lower. The suffix "-ensis" denotes a location, and E. uruguayensis was originally described from Uruguay.

Ectrepopterus uruguayensis lacks a common name, but is referred to under the general "tetra" label in English and the "mojarra" label in Spanish.

== Description ==
Ectrepopterus uruguayensis reaches a maximum of 5.1 cm (2.0 in) SL (standard length, without the tail fin included). The body is elongated and horizontally compressed, and is deepest within the range of the dorsal-fin origin. The caudal peduncle is relatively long and usually straight, occasionally with slight concavity above and below. The eye is wider than the snout is long, and the lower jaw protrudes slightly past the upper. The lateral line is incomplete, with 5–9 pored scales (most often 6).

There are 10–12 dorsal-fin rays (ii, 8–10 - meaning two unbranched rays and 8 to 10 branched rays), 11–13 pectoral-fin rays (i, 10–12), 7 or 8 pelvic-fin rays (i, 6 or 7), and 22–31 anal-fin rays (iii–v, 19–26). There are hooks on the pectoral-fin rays; while hooks on various fin-rays are common in various characid species, their presence on the pectoral fin in particular is unusual, and can be used as diagnostic criteria for E. uruguayensis when compared to similar species. The lower lobe of the caudal fin is sometimes longer than the upper, which Fowler cited amongst further diagnostic criteria; however, this is not uncommon in small characins, and is not present in all specimens of E. uruguayensis. As such, it should not be regarded as a distinguishing feature, though it is of occasional note during research.

The base scale color for E. uruguayensis ranges from silvery-yellow to golden, with scattered dark-brown dots on the top and sides of the head and body. There is a single humeral spot, vertically elongated, positioned over the third or fourth lateral-line scale; this spot extends over one or two of the scale rows above and below the line. There is a narrow lateral stripe that starts in the middle of the back half of the body and extends to the base of the middle caudal-fin rays, expanding on the caudal peduncle itself to form a triangle-shaped spot. The midlateral portion of the body also has a row of chevron-shaped marks pointing forward.

All fins sport scattered black chromatophores (pigment cells), but have varying base colors; the dorsal fin is yellowish, as are the caudal fin and adipose fin. The tips of the caudal-fin rays are darkened, and the middle rays have scattered black dots due to the melanophores there (black pigment cells, specifically).The pectoral fins are hyaline (clear); the ventral fin is orangish.

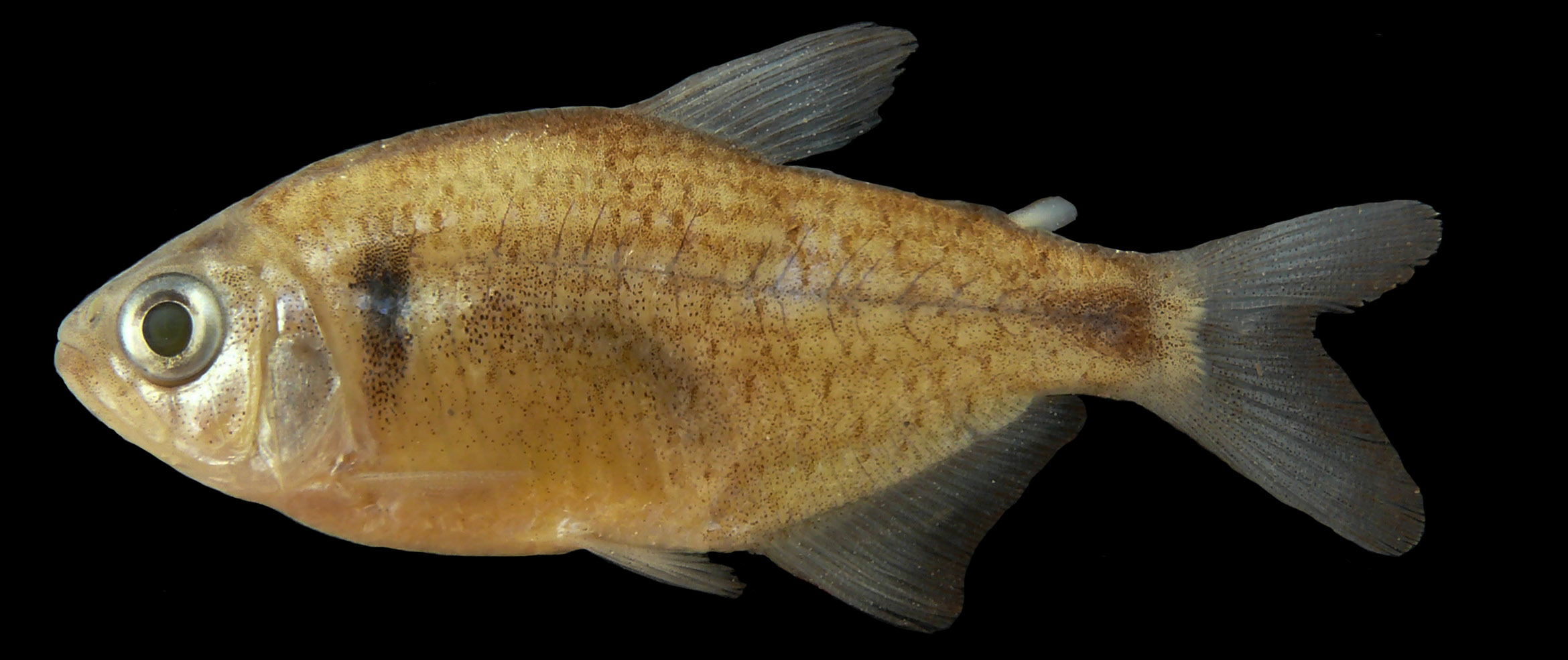
This specimen is a female, as can be told by the smooth concavity of the anal fin.

When preserved in alcohol, the top and sides of the head and body turn brown, still with the scattered dark-brown dots of a living specimen. Other elements of the general pattern remain similar to those in life. In larger specimens (above 3.5 cm (1.4 in) SL), the upper and lower borders of the scales are darkened, which forms a wavy pattern that becomes more prominent in the middle of the body; this is not as obvious in living specimens. The fins are a pale gray-brown. The holotype - the original preserved individual of the species - is discolored, and has a more diffuse pattern than a normal specimen (with the sole exception of the humeral spot, which remains pigmented).

=== Sexual dimorphism ===
Mature males of E. uruguayensis display small bony hooks on all fin-rays, while females do not. Females sport a concave anal-fin profile, where it is almost straight in males. Other dimorphisms, such as morphometric or coloration differences, are absent between the sexes.

== Distribution and ecology ==
Ectrepopterus uruguayensis was originally described from Uruguay, though Fowler failed to provide specific details. For a period of roughly 20 years from 1990 to 2010, there were no records of the species anywhere else; before then, there were instances of occasional specimens from the portion of the Río Uruguay in Brazil. A 2013 report of specimens found in Argentina broadened this range somewhat, and specimens were rediscovered in the Pampas region of Brazil in May 2023, again expanding the known range. Still, the area of occurrence remains relatively restricted.

Generally, E. uruguayensis displays a preference for streams, and occurs in shallow areas (less than 1 m depth) with a notable current, though it has been cited from semi-still waters and areas of up to 2 m depth. It is found in regions with aquatic and riparian vegetation both. While it has its preferences, it also demonstrates some adaptability to weather conditions that influence its habitat; for instance, heavy rainfall may result in turbid water with a muddy substrate, while a drought might result in transparent water and a depth as little as 30 cm (12 in).

Ectrepopterus uruguayensis is a generally amicable fish that occurs in low-density populations, with an extensive list of syntopic species from various fish families. Syntopic species also in the family Characidae, to which E. uruguayensis belongs, include Bryconamericus stramineus, Charax stenopterus, Cheirodon interruptus, Diapoma terofali, Oligosarcus jenynsii, and at least three species of Astyanax. Other fishes from various families include Cyphocharax spilotus and Steindachnerina biornata (from family Curimatidae); Characidium rachovii and Characidium tenue (family Crenuchidae); Hoplias malabaricus (Erythrinidae); Hisonotus maculipinnis and Hypostomus commersoni (Loricariidae); Cnesterodon decemmaculatus (Poeciliidae); and Australoheros facetus, Australoheros scitulus, Crenicichla scottii, and Gymnogeophagus meridionalis (Cichlidae). Hoplias malabaricus in particular, also called the trahira, is likely to be a predator of E. uruguayensis, given that it regularly preys on other small characids, such as members of Hyphessobrycon and Astyanax.

Other details are sparse, regarding aspects such as diet, behavior, and mating habits.

== Conservation status ==
Ectrepopterus uruguayensis is considered Near Threatened by the IUCN. It is considered a priority species for conservation action, as it is generally thought to be a rare fish, given its restricted range and that it normally occurs in low densities. Because it was long considered to be endemic to Uruguay, it is eligible for protection under SNAP (Sistema Nacional de Áreas Protegidas, or System of National Areas under Protection), which provides a buffer against potential survival pressures.
