= Praealticus margaritarius =

Scientific classification
- Domain: Eukaryota
- Kingdom: Animalia
- Phylum: Chordata
- Class: Actinopterygii
- Order: Blenniiformes
- Family: Blenniidae
- Genus: Praealticus
- Species: P. margaritarius

Binomial name
- Praealticus margaritarius (Snyder, 1908)

Synonyms
- Alticus margaritarius Snyder, 1908

Species of fish

Praealticus margaritarius is a species of combtooth blenny found in the northwest Pacific ocean, around Japan. This species grows to a length of 10 centimetres (3.9 in) TL.
