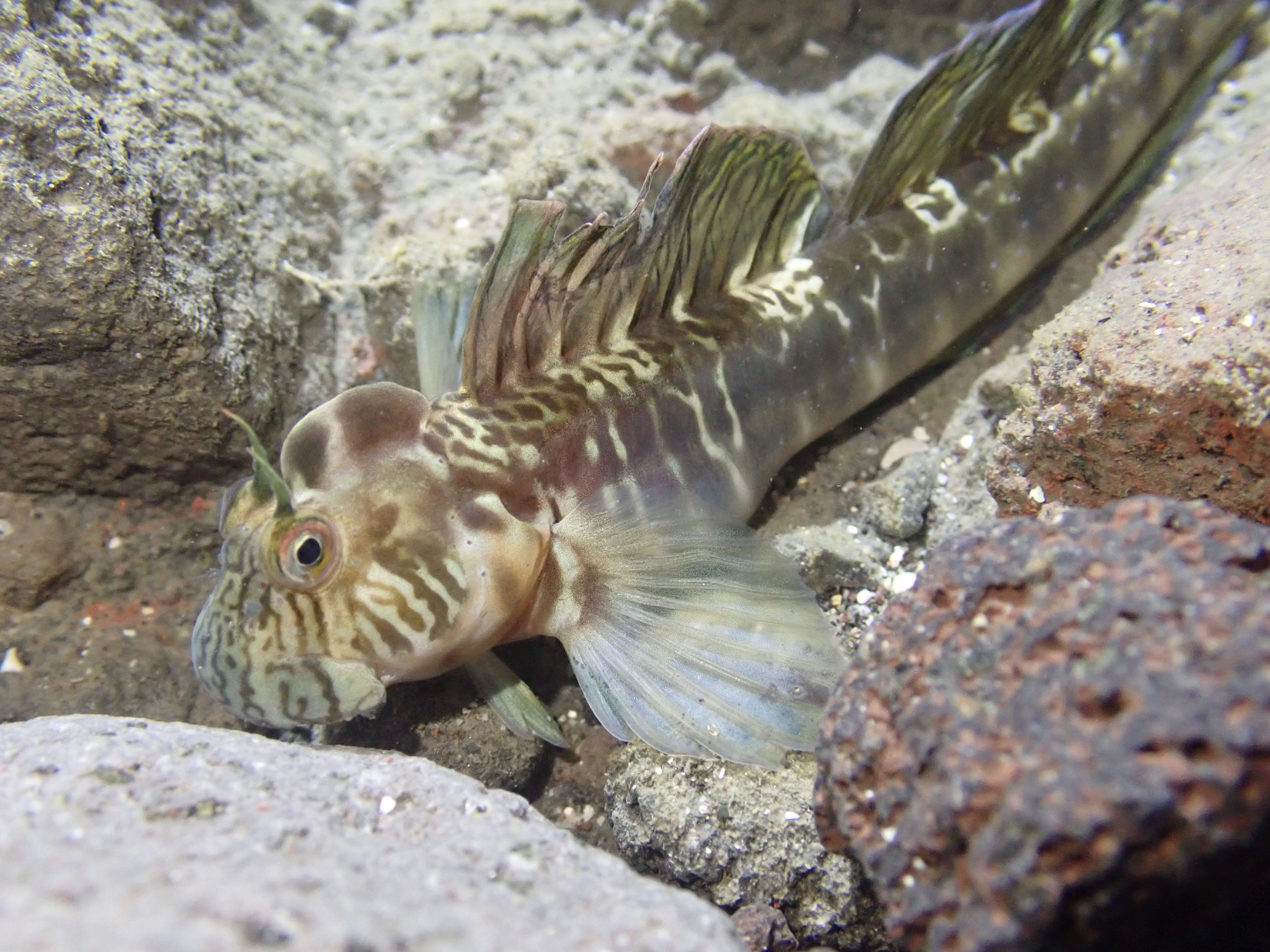

Conservation status
- Least Concern (IUCN 3.1)

Scientific classification
- Kingdom: Animalia
- Phylum: Chordata
- Class: Actinopterygii
- Order: Blenniiformes
- Family: Blenniidae
- Genus: Praealticus
- Species: P. tanegasimae

Binomial name
- Praealticus tanegasimae (D. S. Jordan & Starks, 1906)

Synonyms
- Salarias tanegasimae Jordan & Starks, 1906

= Praealticus tanegasimae =

Species of fish

Praealticus tanegasimae is a species of combtooth blenny found in the western Pacific ocean. This species grows to a length of 5.9 centimetres (2.3 in) SL.
