= Praealticus multistriatus =

Conservation status
- Least Concern (IUCN 3.1)

Scientific classification
- Kingdom: Animalia
- Phylum: Chordata
- Class: Actinopterygii
- Order: Blenniiformes
- Family: Blenniidae
- Genus: Praealticus
- Species: P. multistriatus

Binomial name
- Praealticus multistriatus Bath, 1992

Species of fish

Praealticus multistriatus, the linedfin rockskipper , is a species of combtooth blenny found in the Pacific Ocean, around Tonga.
