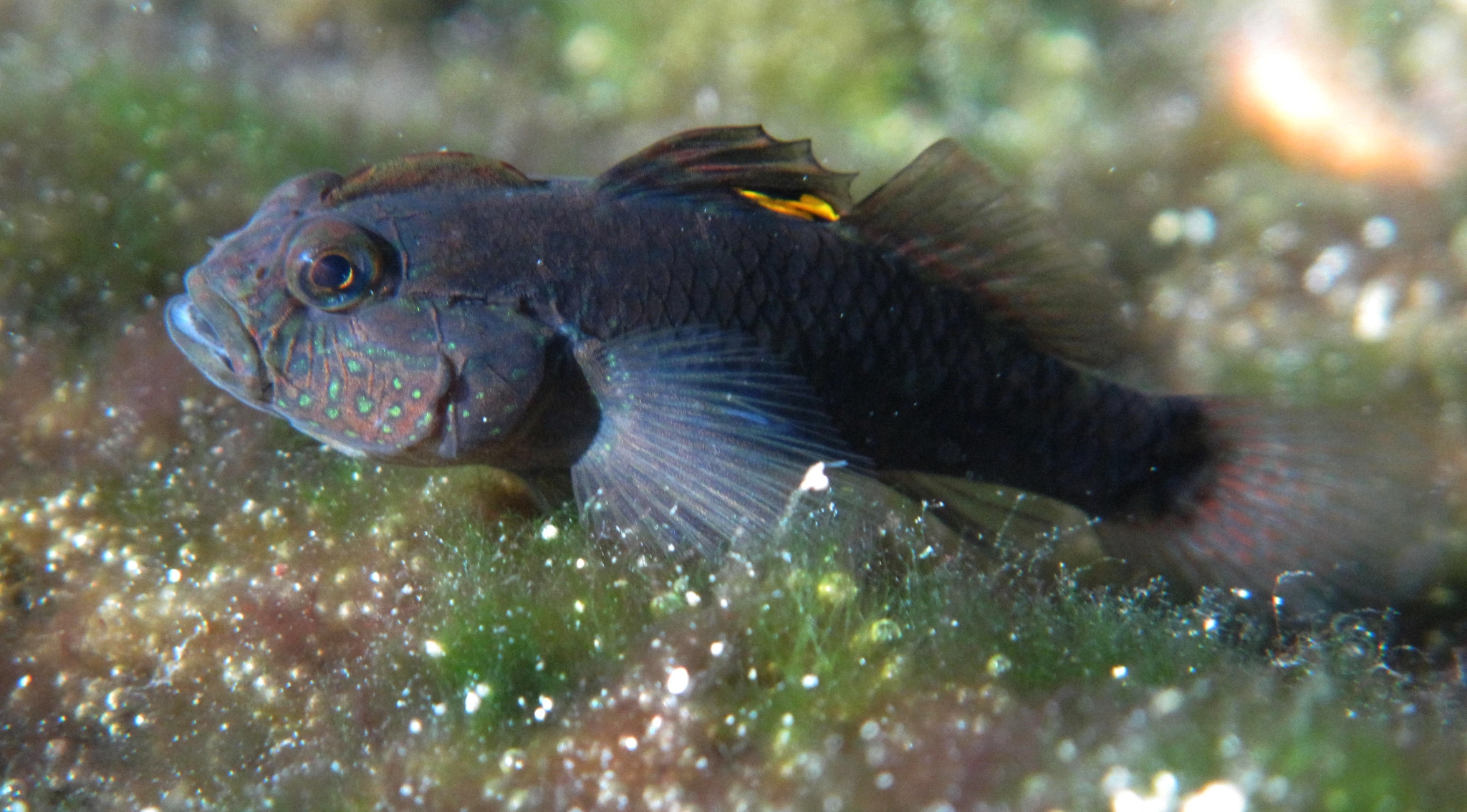
- Male, in Mexico
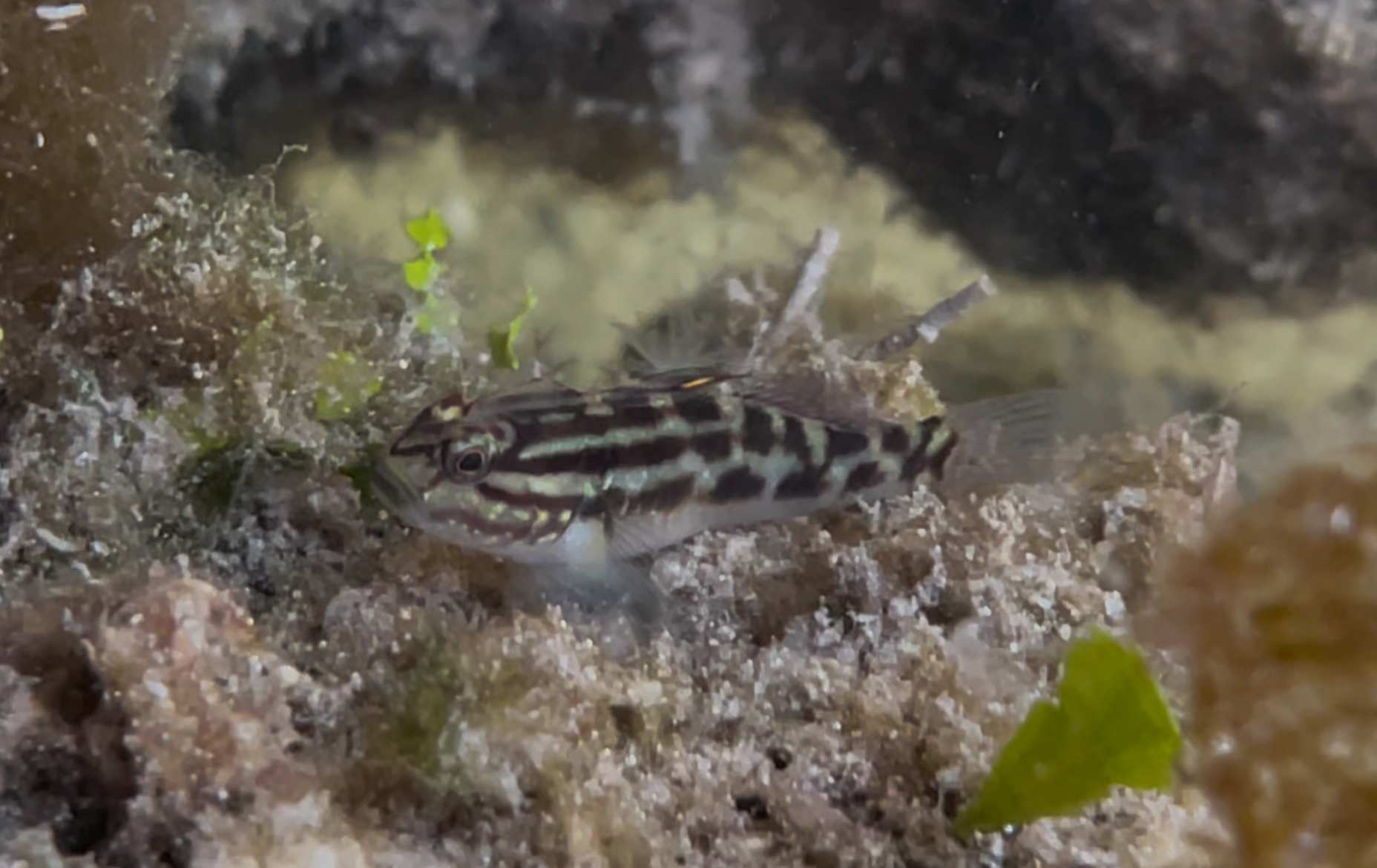
- Female, in Florida

Conservation status
- Least Concern (IUCN 3.1)

Scientific classification
- Kingdom: Animalia
- Phylum: Chordata
- Class: Actinopterygii
- Division: Teleostei
- Order: Gobiiformes
- Family: Gobiidae
- Genus: Lophogobius
- Species: L. cyprinoides

Binomial name
- Lophogobius cyprinoides Pallas, 1770

= Lophogobius cyprinoides =

Species of fish

Lophogobius cyprinoides, commonly known as the crested goby, is a small fish that is widespread throughout the western Atlantic Ocean.

== Distribution ==
This widespread species occurs throughout the western Atlantic Ocean, from South Florida and Bermuda, throughout the Caribbean, and along the coasts of Central & northern South America.

== Habitat ==
Adults are capable of dwelling in fresh or saltwater and inhabit tidal creeks, estuaries, mangroves and other coastal waters with salinity ranging from 0.0 to 39.3 ppt. Crested gobies favor mangroves because it uses the extensive underwater roots for shelter and hiding.

== Description ==
The crested goby is a small but stout fish, reaching a maximum length of 10 cm (3.9 in). Its body appears compressed and a crest extends back from the middle of its eyes. They have six dorsal spines with the fourth spine being the longest, and 16–20 pectoral fin rays which reach beyond the start of the anal fin in adults. The tail is wide and round. Both sexes have reddish-brown to olive mottling along their head and bodies, but those of the males are more extensive and darker in color. The females cheeks are covered with pale spots, also with several

pale lines behind eye, while males have black and orange spots on the first dorsal fin, which change to black and violet during breeding.

== Diet ==
Crested goby feed mainly on algae, but are opportunistic feeders and will take small insects, crustaceans and molluscs.

== Reproduction ==
The vast majority of crested gobies are born females, but some will change to males during their lifespan. Only a small number of individuals are born male; those that are will stay that way for life. Crested goby lay their eggs in rocky areas along the sea bed, where they are secured from being swept away by harsh currents. While they produce a relatively low amount of eggs, crested gobies can breed anytime throughout the year.

== Gallery ==
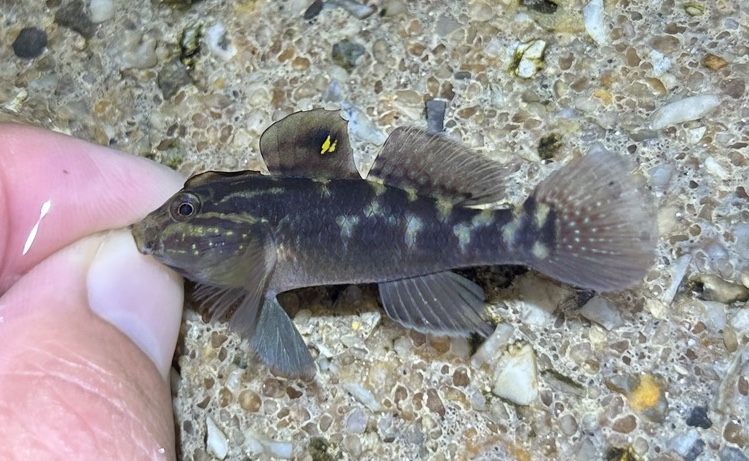

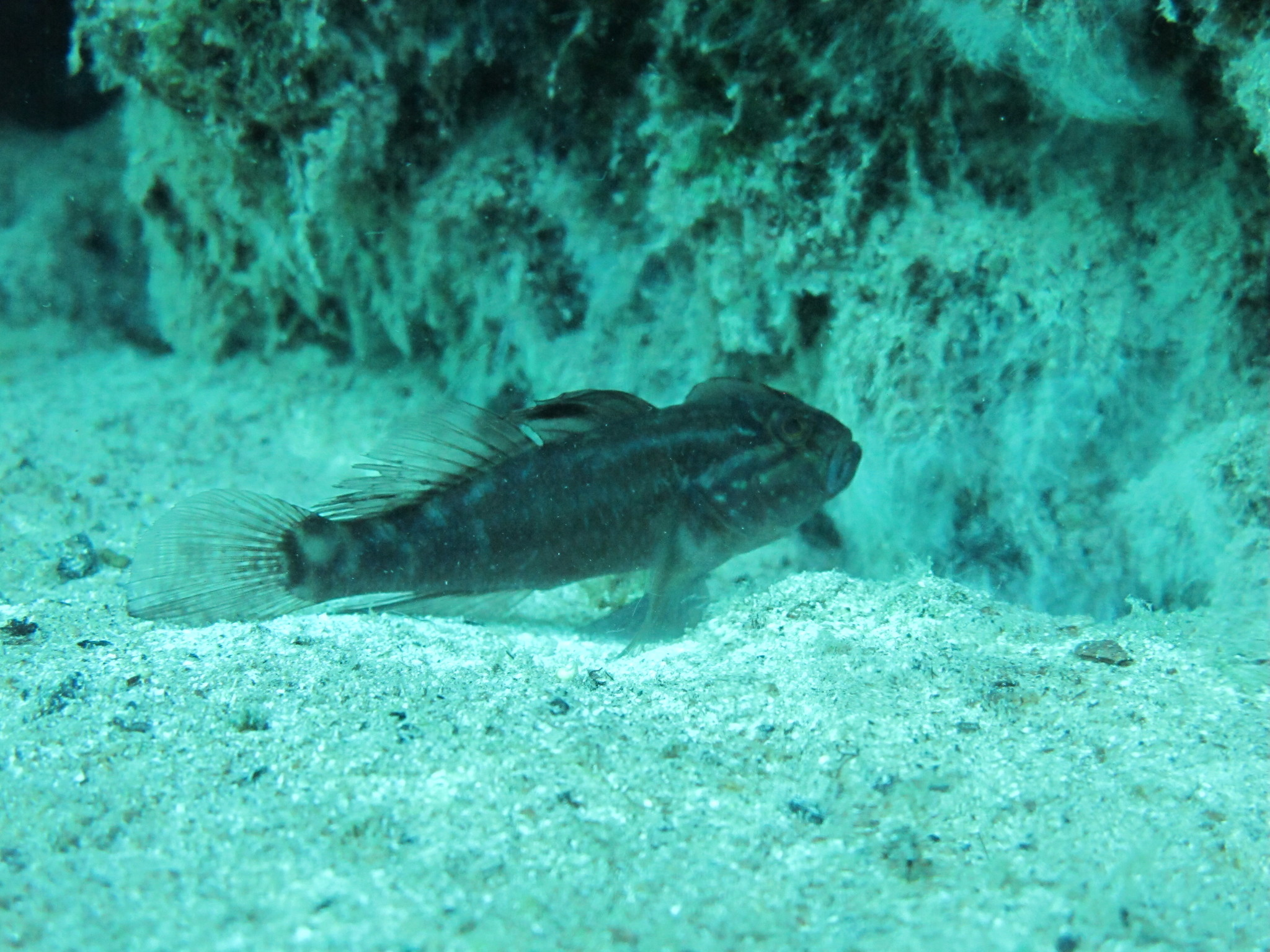

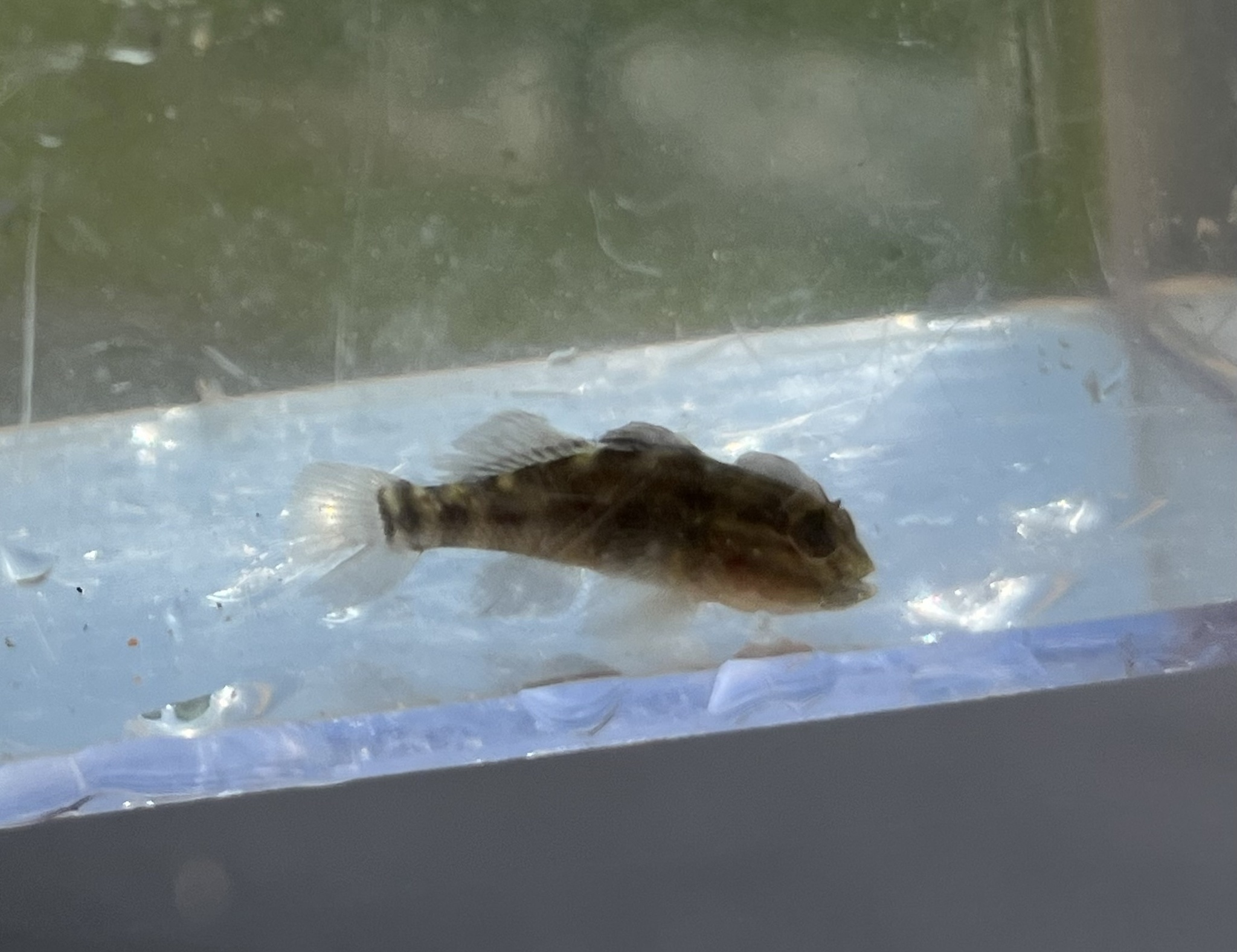

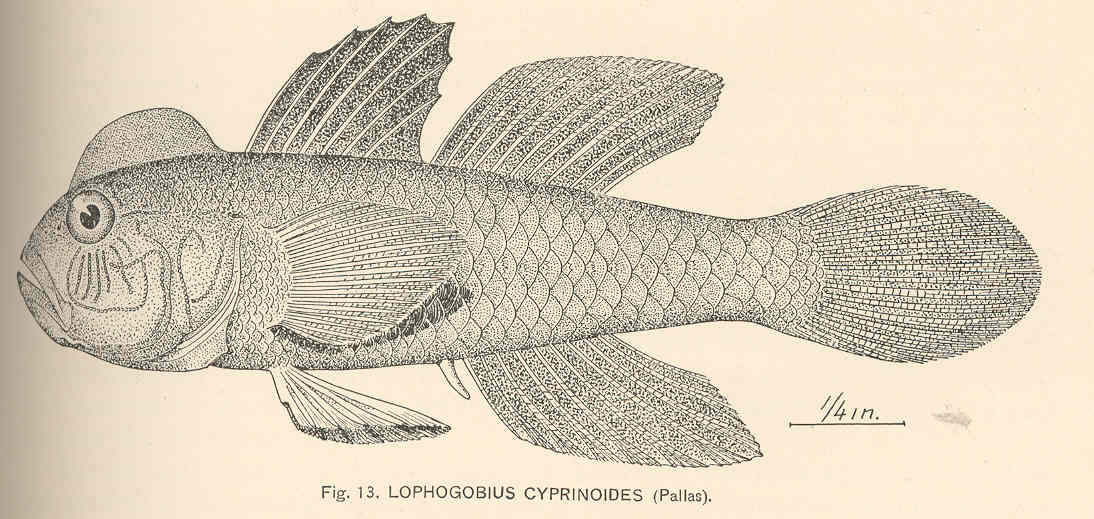
