= Praealticus natalis =

Conservation status
- Vulnerable (IUCN 3.1)

Scientific classification
- Kingdom: Animalia
- Phylum: Chordata
- Class: Actinopterygii
- Order: Blenniiformes
- Family: Blenniidae
- Genus: Praealticus
- Species: P. natalis

Binomial name
- Praealticus natalis (Regan, 1909)

Synonyms
- Salarias natalis Regan, 1909

Species of fish

Praealticus natalis, the Christmas rockskipper, Natal blenny or the Natal rockskipper, is a species of combtooth blenny found in coral reefs around Christmas Island in the eastern Indian Ocean. This species grows to a length of 8 centimetres (3.1 in) TL.
