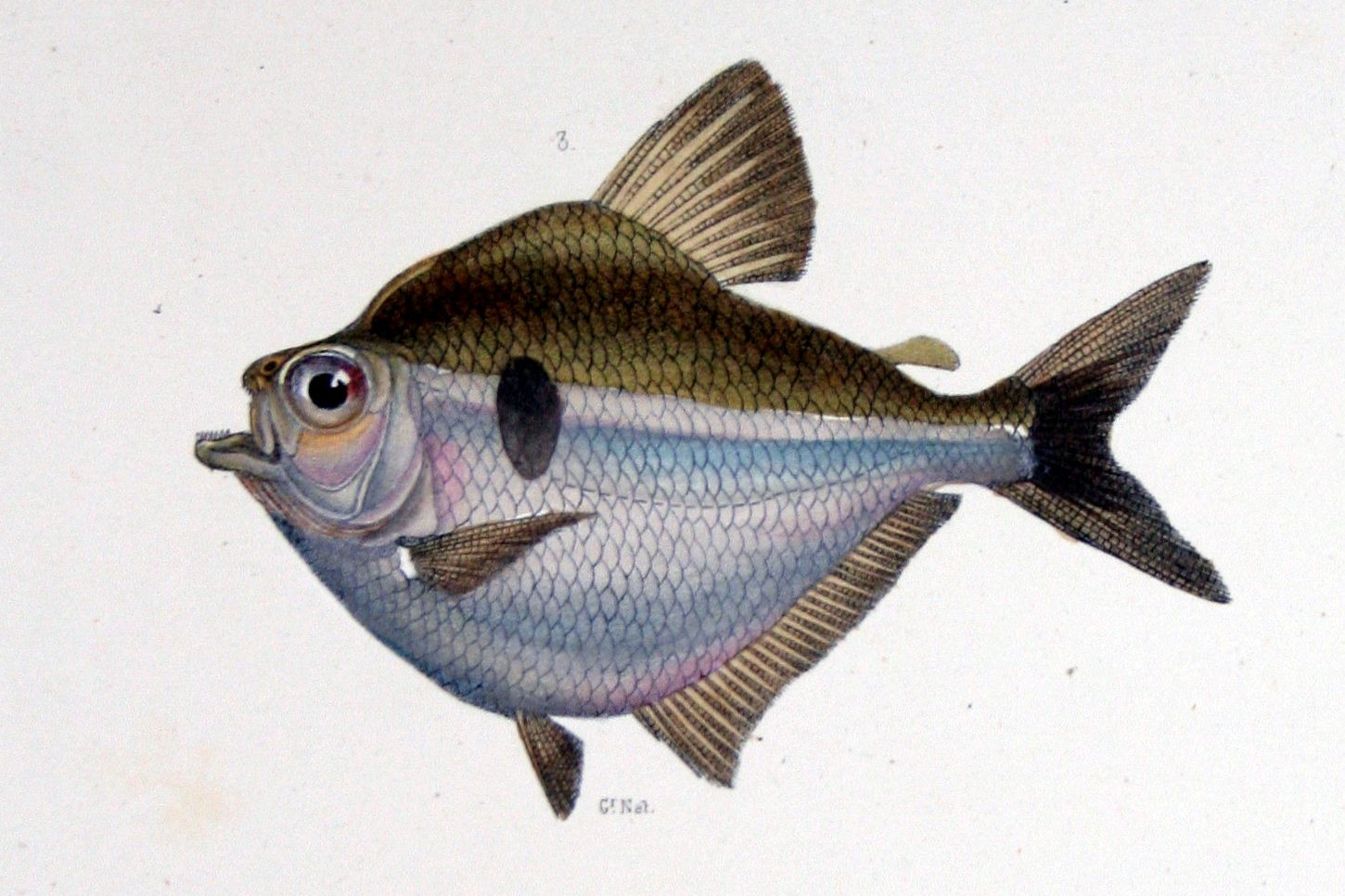

Conservation status
- Least Concern (IUCN 3.1)

Scientific classification
- Kingdom: Animalia
- Phylum: Chordata
- Class: Actinopterygii
- Order: Characiformes
- Family: Acestrorhamphidae
- Genus: Brachychalcinus
- Species: B. orbicularis

Binomial name
- Brachychalcinus orbicularis (Valenciennes, 1850)

Synonyms
- Tetragonopterus orbicularis Valenciennes, 1850; Poptella orbicularis (Valenciennes, 1850); Ephippicharax orbicularis (Valenciennes, 1850); Brachychalcinus guianensis Boeseman, 1952

= Brachychalcinus orbicularis =

Species of fish

Brachychalcinus orbicularis, the discus tetra, is a species of freshwater ray-finned fish belonging to the family Acestrorhamphidae, the American characins. The discus tetra is found in South America in the Amazon and Orinoco basins, and the coastal rivers of the Guianas, being recorded from Bolivia, Brazil, Colombia, French Guiana, Guyana, Peru, Suriname and Venezuela. This species has a maximum standard length of 9 cm (3.5 in).
