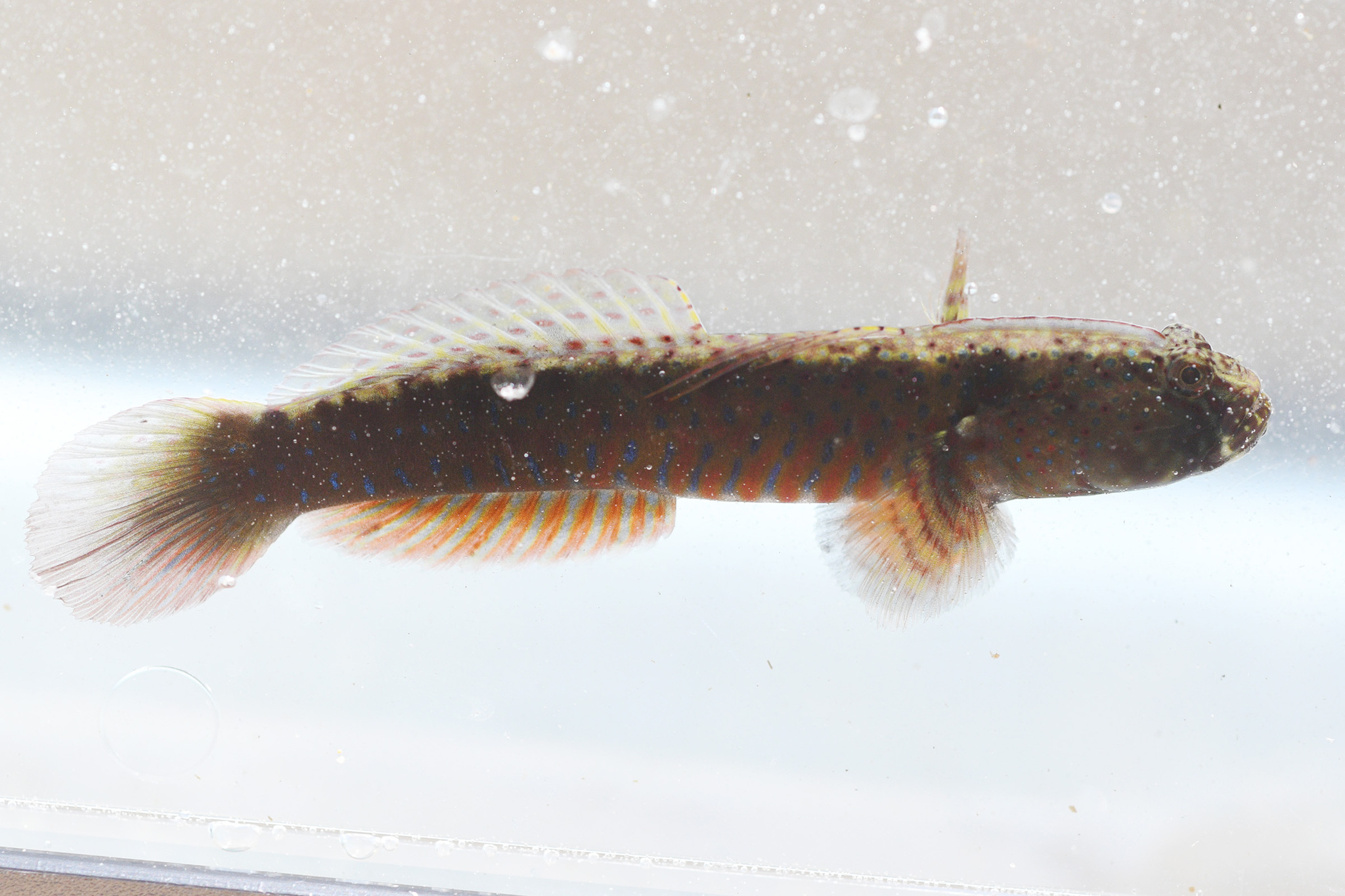

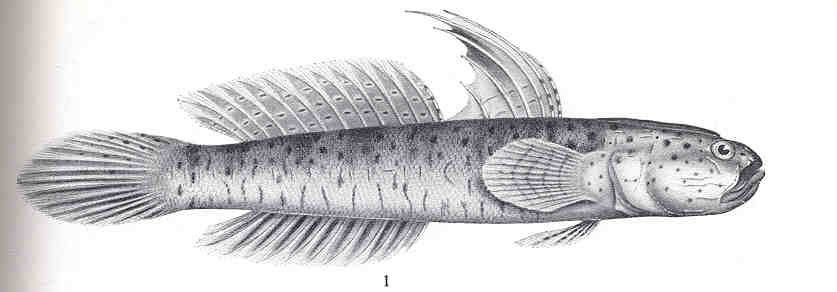

Scientific classification
- Kingdom: Animalia
- Phylum: Chordata
- Class: Actinopterygii
- Division: Teleostei
- Order: Gobiiformes
- Family: Gobiidae
- Genus: Cryptocentroides
- Species: C. gobioides

Binomial name
- Cryptocentroides gobioides (Ogilby, 1886)

= Cryptocentroides gobioides =

Species of fish

Cryptocentroides gobioides, the crested oystergoby, is a species of goby native to eastern Australia. Often found in estuaries and brackish waters, in muddy situations at depths of from 1 to 10 metres (3.3 to 32.8 ft). This species can reach a length of 12 centimetres (4.7 in). A small dark fish, with some red, blue bands or spots. There is a pronounced dorsal ridge of the fish, and the head has a bulbous appearance.

== Gallery ==
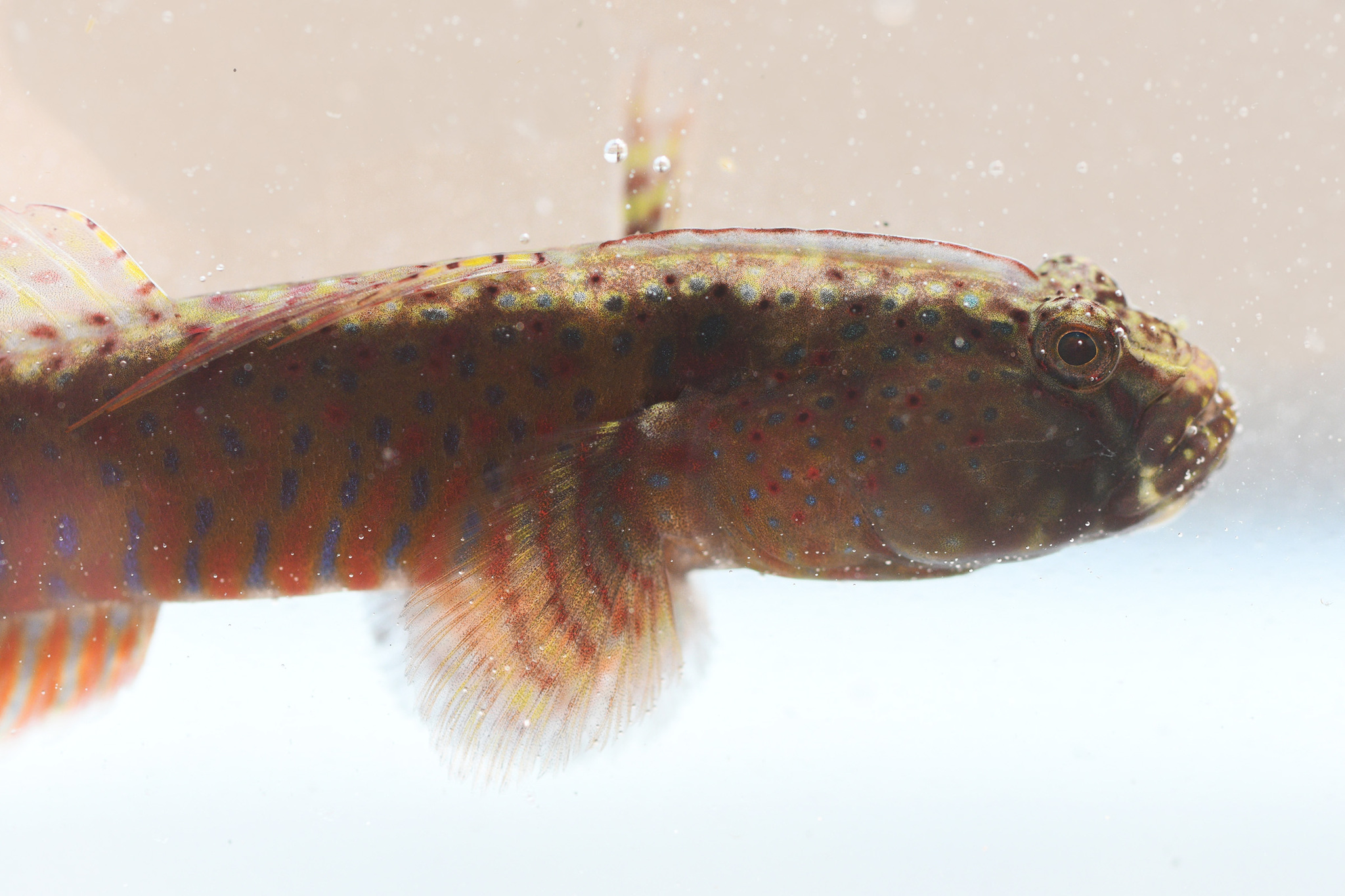

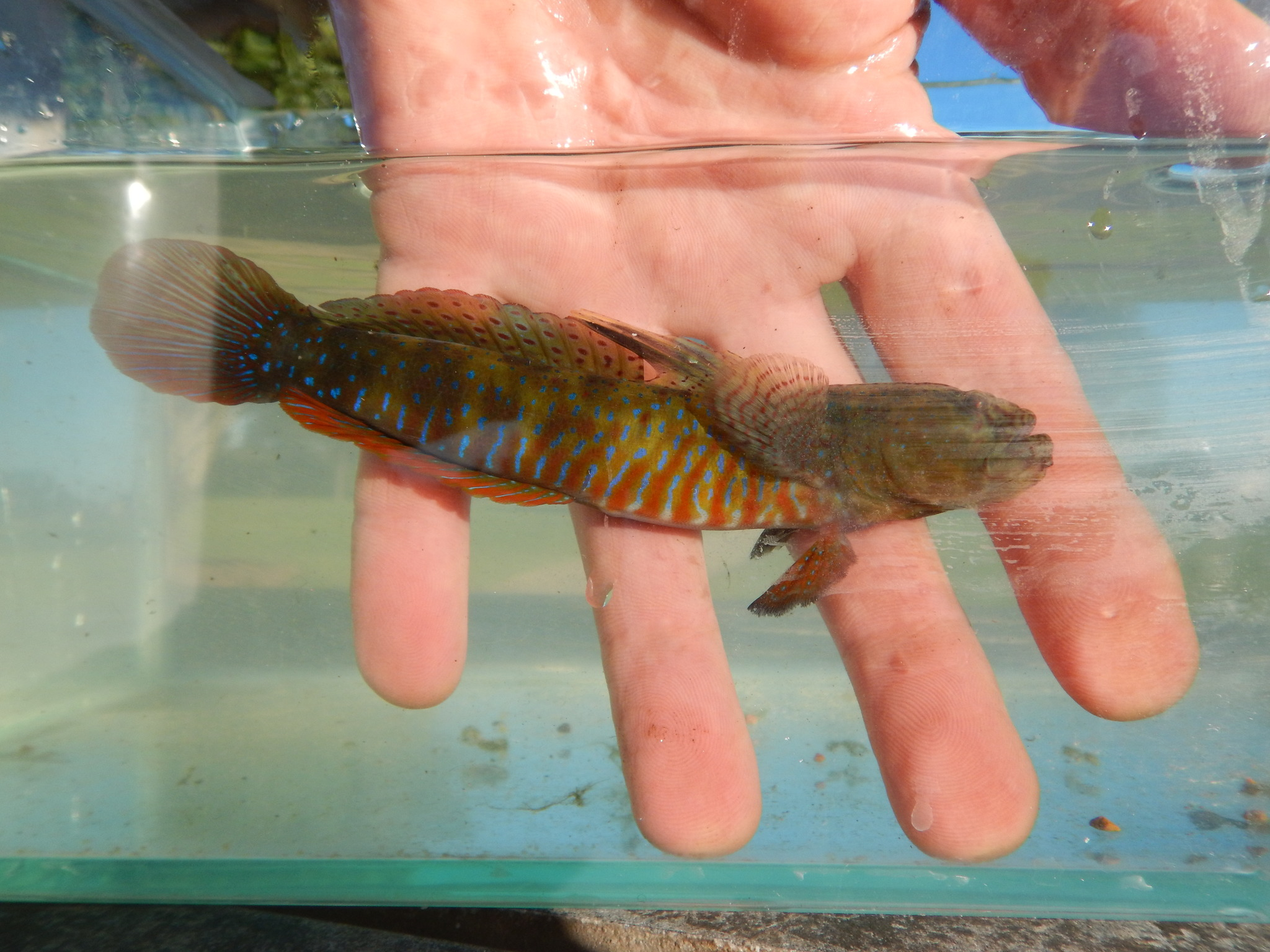

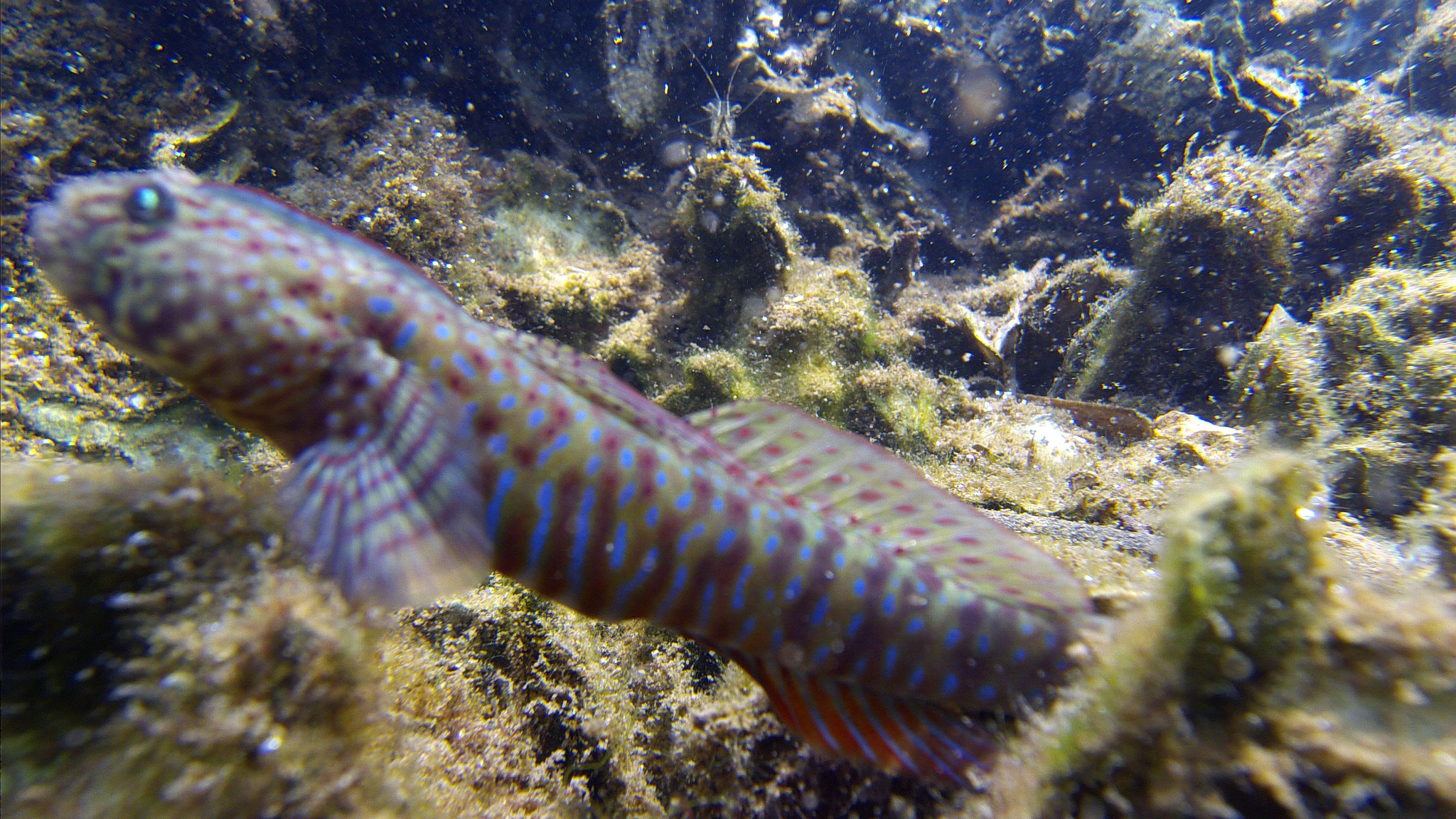
