= Praealticus margaritatus =

Conservation status
- Least Concern (IUCN 3.1)

Scientific classification
- Kingdom: Animalia
- Phylum: Chordata
- Class: Actinopterygii
- Order: Blenniiformes
- Family: Blenniidae
- Genus: Praealticus
- Species: P. margaritatus

Binomial name
- Praealticus margaritatus (Kendall & Radcliffe, 1912)

Species of fish

Praealticus margaritatus is a species of combtooth blenny found in the eastern central Pacific ocean, around Samoa. This species grows to a length of 5.5 centimetres (2.2 in) SL.
