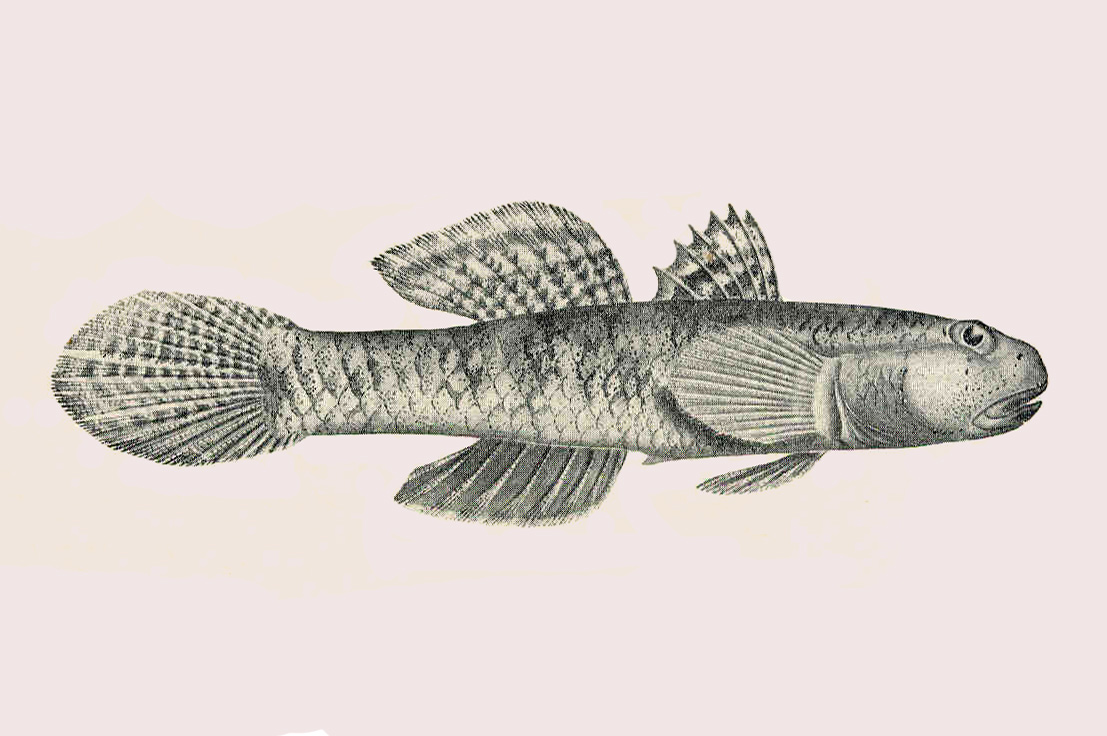

Scientific classification
- Kingdom: Animalia
- Phylum: Chordata
- Class: Actinopterygii
- Order: Gobiiformes
- Family: Oxudercidae
- Genus: Pseudogobius
- Species: P. olorum

Binomial name
- Pseudogobius olorum (Sauvage, 1880)

= Pseudogobius olorum =

Species of goby

Pseudogobius olorum, commonly known as the bluespot goby or the Swan River goby, is a species of carnivorous goby in the family Oxudercidae. It is found in muddy areas and seagrass beds in the upper reaches of estuaries at a depth of 1-30 meters, around the coast of most of Australia save north-western Australia. It is known to penetrate upstream, into freshwater, and may stay there for some time.

== Biology ==
The bluespot goby spawns 150 eggs and the male will guard and fan the eggs. They breed during Autumn and Spring. Females mature at at least 15 mm, all mature by 36 mm. The diet consists of benthic crustaceans and algae in Western Australia, while feeding on detritus and microcrustaceans in Victoria.

== Description ==
Pseudogobius olorum is mottled pale brown to yellow brown in colour, whitish below with 5-6 dark blotches along the back. They are named for the conspicuous blue spot on the rear of the first dorsal fin of males. This species grows up to 7.6 cm in length.
