= Praealticus striatus =

Conservation status
- Least Concern (IUCN 3.1)

Scientific classification
- Kingdom: Animalia
- Phylum: Chordata
- Class: Actinopterygii
- Order: Blenniiformes
- Family: Blenniidae
- Genus: Praealticus
- Species: P. striatus

Binomial name
- Praealticus striatus Bath, 1992

Species of fish

Praealticus striatus, the striated rockskipper, is a species of combtooth blenny found in the western Pacific ocean, in the South China Sea.
