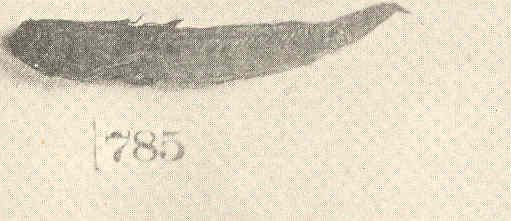

Conservation status
- Least Concern (IUCN 3.1)

Scientific classification
- Kingdom: Animalia
- Phylum: Chordata
- Class: Actinopterygii
- Order: Blenniiformes
- Family: Blenniidae
- Genus: Praealticus
- Species: P. caesius

Binomial name
- Praealticus caesius (Seale, 1906)

Synonyms
- Salarias caesius Seale, 1906

= Praealticus caesius =

Species of fish

Praealticus caesius is a species of combtooth blenny found in the western central Pacific ocean. This species grows to a length of 6.7 centimetres (2.6 in) SL.
