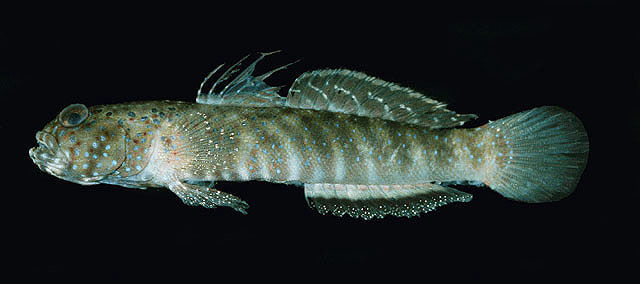
- Cryptocentroides insignis

Scientific classification
- Domain: Eukaryota
- Kingdom: Animalia
- Phylum: Chordata
- Class: Actinopterygii
- Order: Gobiiformes
- Family: Gobiidae
- Genus: Cryptocentroides; Popta, 1922

Type species
- Cryptocentroides dentatus as a synonym of Cryptocentroides insignis Popta, 1922

Synonyms
- Amblycentrus Goren, 1979

= Cryptocentroides =

Genus of fishes

Cryptocentroides is a genus of gobies native to the western Indian Ocean and the western Pacific Ocean.

== Species ==
There are currently three recognized species in this genus:

- Cryptocentroides arabicus (J. F. Gmelin, 1789) (Arabian goby)
- Cryptocentroides gobioides (J. D. Ogilby, 1886) (Crested oystergoby)
- Cryptocentroides insignis (Seale, 1910) (Insignia prawn-goby)
