= Praealticus poptae =

Conservation status
- Least Concern (IUCN 3.1)

Scientific classification
- Kingdom: Animalia
- Phylum: Chordata
- Class: Actinopterygii
- Order: Blenniiformes
- Family: Blenniidae
- Genus: Praealticus
- Species: P. poptae

Binomial name
- Praealticus poptae (Fowler, 1925)

Synonyms
- Rupiscartes poptae Fowler, 1925

Species of fish

Praealticus poptae, the Marianas rockskipper, is a species of combtooth blenny found in coral reefs in the western central Pacific ocean, around the Mariana Islands. This species grows to a length of 4.7 centimetres (1.9 in) SL.

== Etymology ==
The specific name honours the Dutch ichthyologist and curator Canna Maria Louise Popta (1860-1929) of the Rijksmuseum van Natuurlijke Historie in Leiden.
