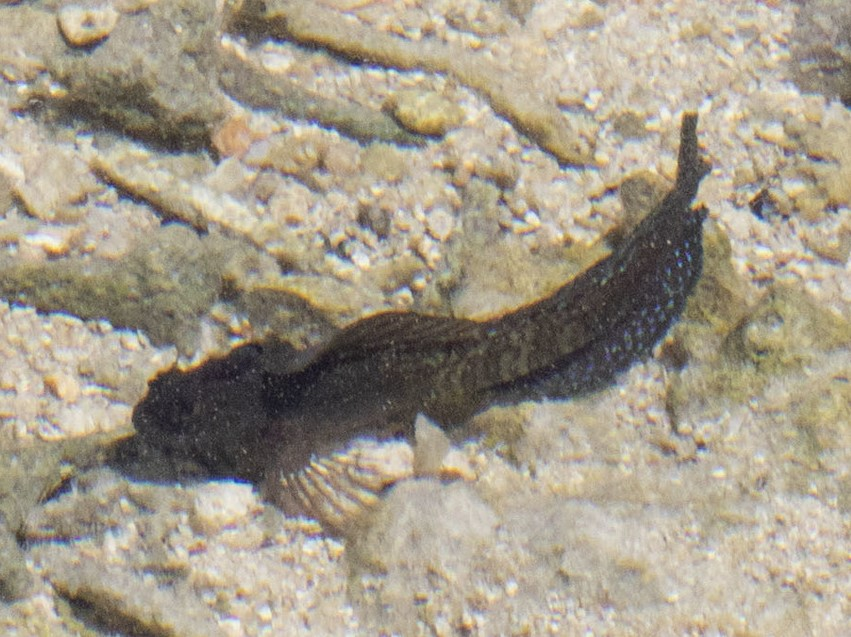
- From a shallow pool at low tide, Neil Island, Andaman.

Conservation status
- Least Concern (IUCN 3.1)

Scientific classification
- Kingdom: Animalia
- Phylum: Chordata
- Class: Actinopterygii
- Order: Blenniiformes
- Family: Blenniidae
- Genus: Praealticus
- Species: P. triangulus

Binomial name
- Praealticus triangulus (W. M. Chapman, 1951)

Synonyms
- Alticus triangulus Chapman, 1951

= Praealticus triangulus =

Species of fish

Praealticus triangulus, the triangle-crest rockskipper is a species of combtooth blenny. It is found in the eastern Indian Ocean, around the Andaman Islands.
