= Stethaprion =

Scientific classification
- Kingdom: Animalia
- Phylum: Chordata
- Class: Actinopterygii
- Order: Characiformes
- Family: Acestrorhamphidae
- Subfamily: Stethaprioninae
- Genus: Stethaprion; Cope, 1870

Type species
- Stethaprion erythrops Cope, 1870

Genus of fishes

Stethaprion s a genus of freshwater ray-finned fish belonging to the family Acestrorhamphidae, the American characins. The fishes in this genus are found in tropical South America.

== Species ==
Stethaprion contains the following valid species:

- Stethaprion crenatum C. H. Eigenmann, 1916
- Stethaprion erythrops Cope, 1870
