= Praealticus =

- Praealticus labrovittatus jumping

Scientific classification
- Kingdom: Animalia
- Phylum: Chordata
- Class: Actinopterygii
- Order: Blenniiformes
- Family: Blenniidae
- Subfamily: Salariinae
- Genus: Praealticus; L. P. Schultz & W. M. Chapman, 1960

Type species
- Salarias natalis Regan, 1909

Genus of fishes

Praealticus is a genus of combtooth blennies found throughout the Pacific and Indian oceans.

== Species ==
There are currently 14 recognized species in this genus:

- Praealticus bilineatus (W. K. H. Peters, 1868)
- Praealticus caesius (Seale, 1906)
- Praealticus dayi (Whitley, 1929)
- Praealticus labrovittatus Bath, 1992 (Crenulate-lipped rockskipper)
- Praealticus margaritarius (Snyder, 1908)
- Praealticus margaritatus (Kendall & Radcliffe, 1912)
- Praealticus multistriatus Bath, 1992
- Praealticus natalis (Regan, 1909) (Christmas rockskipper)
- Praealticus oortii (Bleeker, 1851)
- Praealticus poptae (Fowler, 1925) (Marianas rockskipper)
- Praealticus semicrenatus (W. M. Chapman, 1951)
- Praealticus striatus Bath, 1992
- Praealticus tanegasimae (D. S. Jordan & Starks, 1906)
- Praealticus triangulus (W. M. Chapman, 1951)
