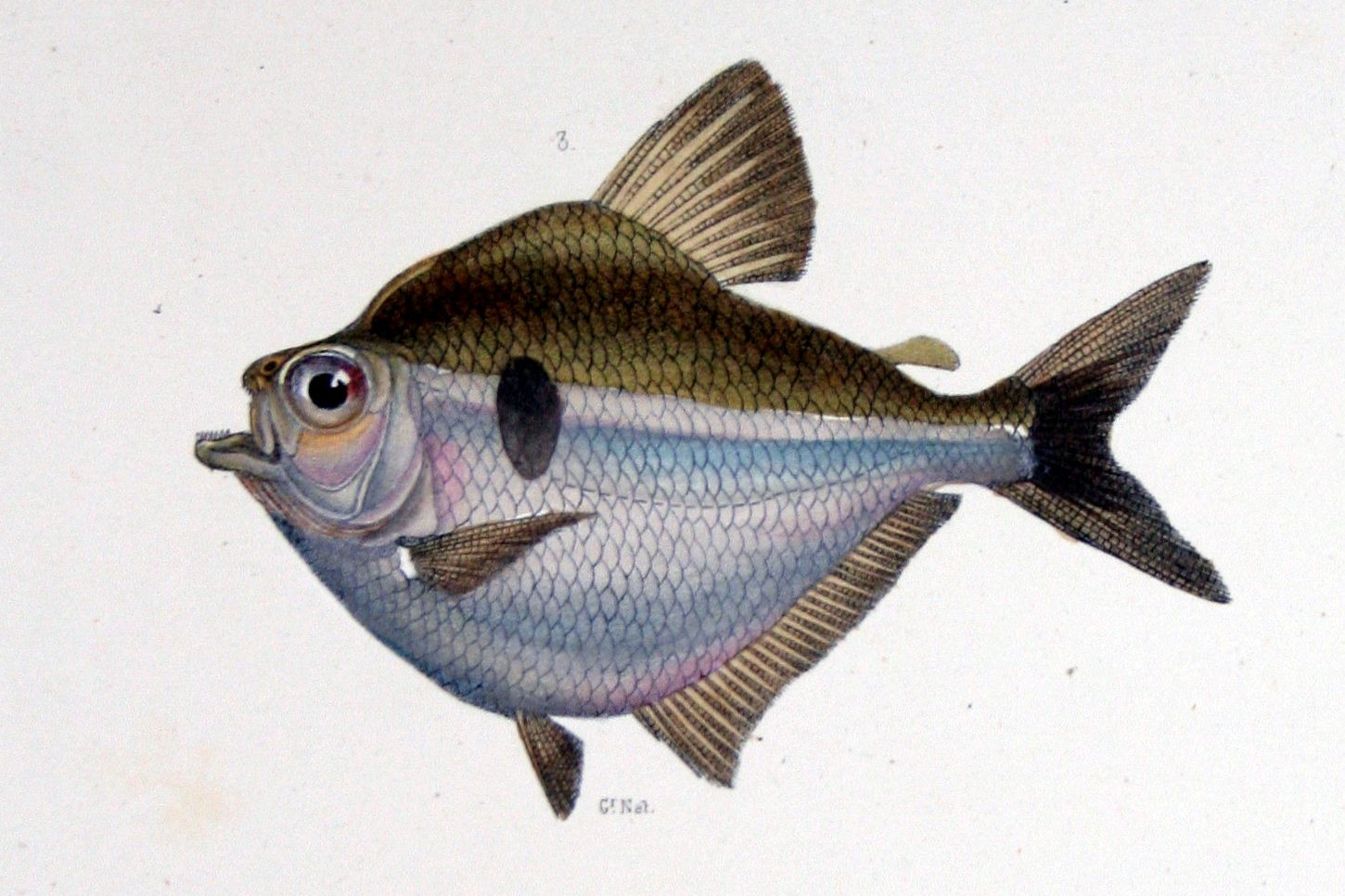
- Brachychalcinus orbicularis

Scientific classification
- Kingdom: Animalia
- Phylum: Chordata
- Class: Actinopterygii
- Order: Characiformes
- Family: Acestrorhamphidae
- Subfamily: Stethaprioninae
- Genus: Brachychalcinus; Boulenger, 1892

Type species
- Brachychalcinus retrospina Boulenger, 1892

= Brachychalcinus =

Genus of fishes

Brachychalcinus is a genus of freshwater ray-finned fishes belonging to the family Acestrorhamphidae. The fishes in this genus are found in tropical South America.

== Species ==
Brachychalcinus contains the following valid species:

- Brachychalcinus copei (Steindachner, 1882)
- Brachychalcinus nummus J. E. Böhlke, 1958
- Brachychalcinus orbicularis (Valenciennes, 1850) (discus tetra)
- Brachychalcinus parnaibae R. E. dos Reis, 1989
- Brachychalcinus reisi Garcia-Ayala, Ohara, Pastana & Benine, 2017
- Brachychalcinus retrospina Boulenger, 1892
- Brachychalcinus sabaji Garcia-Ayala, Lima, Gama & Benine, 2024
- Brachychalcinus signatus Garcia-Ayala & Benine, 2020
