= Praealticus oortii =

Conservation status
- Least Concern (IUCN 3.1)

Scientific classification
- Kingdom: Animalia
- Phylum: Chordata
- Class: Actinopterygii
- Order: Blenniiformes
- Family: Blenniidae
- Genus: Praealticus
- Species: P. oortii

Binomial name
- Praealticus oortii (Bleeker, 1851)

Synonyms
- Salarias oortii Bleeker, 1851

Species of fish

Praealticus oortii is a species of combtooth blenny found in the eastern Indian Ocean from the Andaman Sea to Timor in the western Pacific. The identity of the person honoured by the specific name of this blenny was not specified but it is thought to be most likely to be the draftsman and illustrator Peter van Oort (1804-1834), who, as part of the Physics Commission for the Dutch East Indies, explored Java which is the type locality of this species.
