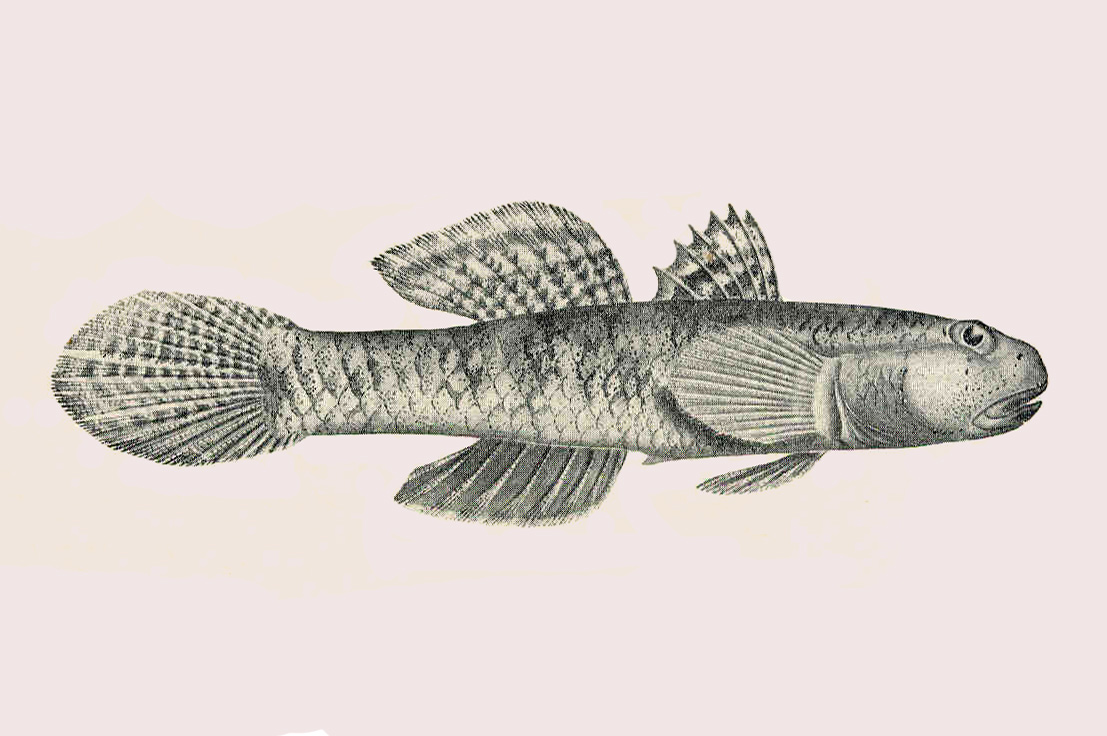
- Pseudogobius olorum

Scientific classification
- Kingdom: Animalia
- Phylum: Chordata
- Class: Actinopterygii
- Order: Gobiiformes
- Family: Oxudercidae
- Subfamily: Gobionellinae
- Genus: Pseudogobius; Popta, 1922

Type species
- None designated but Gobius javanicus Bleeker, 1856 should be designated as such

Synonyms
- Lizagobius Whitley, 1933; Pseudogobius Koumans, 1931; Pseudogobius Aurich, 1938

= Pseudogobius =

Genus of fishes

Pseudogobius is a genus of fish in the goby family, Gobiidae. It is widely distributed in tropical and temperate regions of the Indian and western Pacific Oceans. Species occur in freshwater and estuarine habitat types, such as mangroves and seagrass beds.

== Species ==
There are currently 15 recognized species in this genus:

- Pseudogobius aquilonius Larson & Hammer, 2021
- Pseudogobius avicennia Herre, 1940
- Pseudogobius cinctus Larson & Hammer, 2021
- Pseudogobius eos Larson & Hammer, 2021
- Pseudogobius fulvicaudus S. P. Huang, K. T. Shao & I. S. Chen, 2014
- Pseudogobius hoesei Larson & Hammer, 2021
- Pseudogobius javanicus (Bleeker, 1856) (Species inquirenda)
- Pseudogobius jeffi Larson & Hammer, 2021
- Pseudogobius masago Tomiyama, 1936
- Pseudogobius melanosticta F. Day, 1876
- Pseudogobius minimus (Hora, 1923)
- Pseudogobius olorum (Sauvage, 1880) (Bluespot goby)
- Pseudogobius poicilosoma Bleeker, 1849 (Northern fatnose goby)
- Pseudogobius rhizophora Larson & Hammer, 2021
- Pseudogobius taijiangensis I. S. Chen S. P. Huang & K. Y. Huang, 2014
- Pseudogobius verticalis Larson & Hammer, 2021
