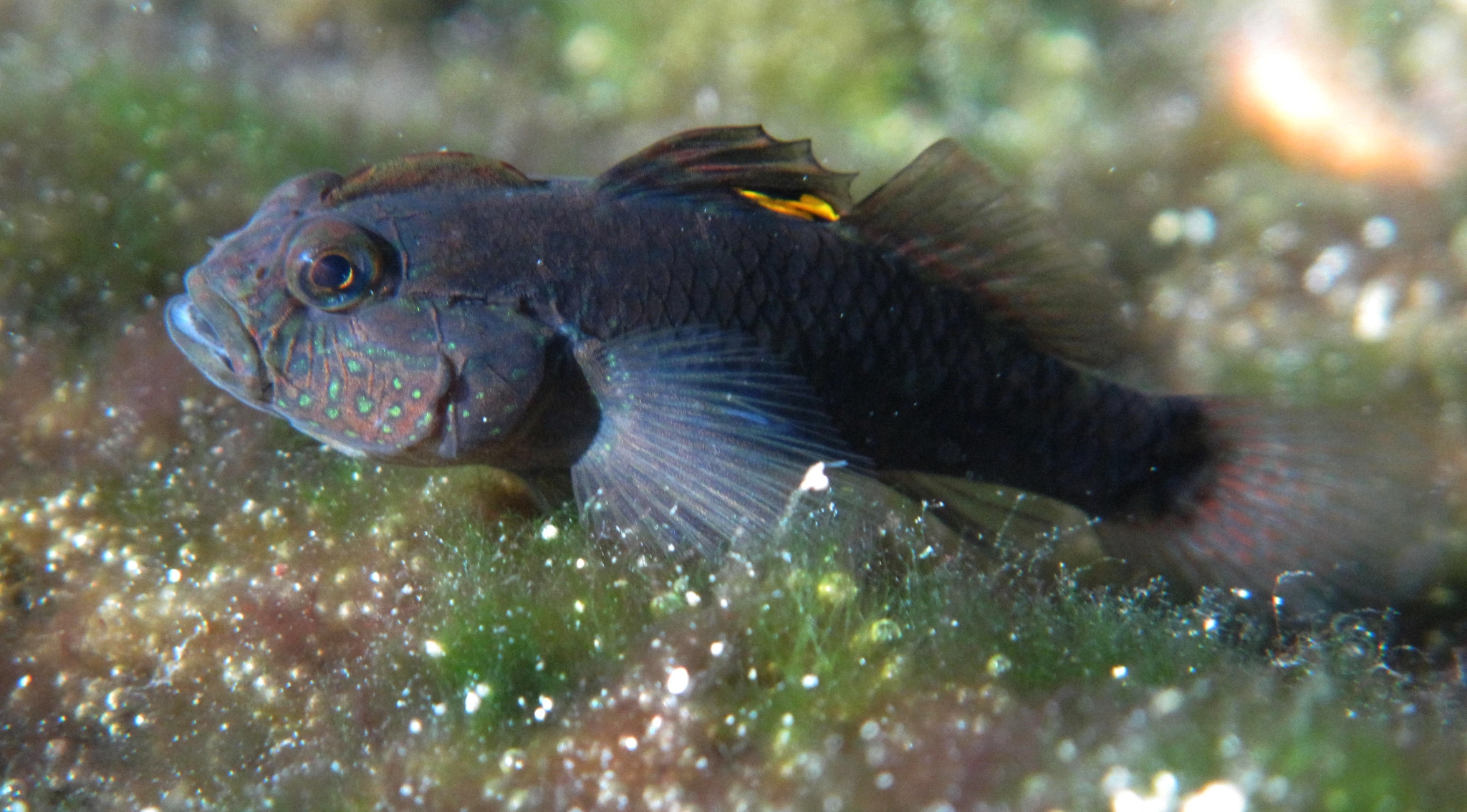
- Crested goby (Lophogobius cyprinoides)

Scientific classification
- Kingdom: Animalia
- Phylum: Chordata
- Class: Actinopterygii
- Order: Gobiiformes
- Family: Gobiidae
- Genus: Lophogobius; T. N. Gill, 1862

Type species
- Gobius cristagalli Valenciennes, 1837

= Lophogobius =

Genus of fishes

Lophogobius is a small genus of gobies native to the Pacific and western Atlantic oceans.

== Species ==
There are currently 2 recognized species in this genus:

- Lophogobius cristulatus Ginsburg, 1939
- Lophogobius cyprinoides (Pallas, 1770) (Crested goby)
